= List of fleets and major commands of the Royal Navy =

The professional head of the Royal Navy is known as the First Sea Lord and Chief of the Naval Staff (1SL/CNS).

There are presently two senior subordinates to the 1SL: the Second Sea Lord, who is also the Deputy Chief of the Naval Staff; and the Fleet Commander.

== Fleets up until 2012 ==
- Atlantic Fleet - Commander-in-Chief Atlantic Fleet (1909–1914, 1919–1932)
- Battle Cruiser Fleet (1915–19)
- British Pacific Fleet - Commander-in-Chief British Pacific Fleet (1944–1945)
- Commander-in-Chief Fleet (1971-2012, succeeded by post of Fleet Commander)
- Channel Fleet - Commander-in-Chief Channel Fleet (1904-1909, 1914–1915)
- Channel Squadron - Vice-Admiral, Commanding Channel Squadron (1859-1904) - designated Fleet
- Eastern Fleet - Commander-in-Chief Eastern Fleet (formerly only C-in-Cs East Indies, Australia and China Stations), 1941–1971.
- First Fleet - Commander-in-Chief First Fleet, (1912–14)
- Far East Fleet - Commander, Far East Fleet c.1952-1971
- Grand Fleet - Commander-in-Chief Grand Fleet (1914-1918)
- Home Fleet - Commander-in-Chief Home Fleet (1902–1904 and 1932–1967)
- Mediterranean Fleet - Commander-in-Chief Mediterranean (1690–1967)
- North Sea Fleet, Commander-in-Chief, North Sea Fleet, (1781-1815)
- Reserve Fleet - Vice Admiral Commanding, Reserve Fleet (interwar, at least since 1928 (1700 - 1960)
- Second Fleet - Commander-in-Chief Second Fleet, (1912–14)
- Third Fleet - Commander-in-Chief Third Fleet, (1912–14)
- Western Fleet - Commander-in-Chief Western Fleet (1967–1971)

== Historic commands ==
Included:

=== Commanders-in-Chief ===
- Commander-in-Chief, Africa, HQ Simonstown (1920–1939) (succeeded by South Atlantic from 1939).
- Commander-in-Chief, Australia, HQ Admiralty House, Sydney (1859–1913)
- Commander-in-Chief, Coast of Ireland, HQ Queenstown, now called Cobh, (1915-1919)
- Commander-in-Chief, Coast of Scotland (1919 to 1939, replaced Commander-in-Chief, Rosyth in 1919, and reverted to Commander-in-Chief, Rosyth in 1939)
- Commander-in-Chief, Cape of Good Hope Station, (1795–1939)
- Commander-in-Chief, China, HQ Singapore and Wei Hai Wei (1865–1941)
- Commander-in-Chief, Cork (1797-1848)
- Commander-in-Chief, Devonport, (1845-1896)
- Commander-in-Chief, The Downs - (1717–1834)
- Commander-in-Chief, East Indies, HQ Colombo Sri Lanka (Ceylon) (1865–1941)
- Commander-in-Chief, Dover - (1914–1945)
- Commander-in-Chief, East Indies and China, HQ Hong Kong (1831–1865)
- Commander-in-Chief, Jamaica (1655-1823) merged with North America and West Indies Station.
- Commander-in-Chief, Leeward Islands (1743–1821),
- Commander-in-Chief, Levant, (1941-late 1940s)
- Commander-in-Chief, Medway, (1698-1699)
- Commander-in-Chief, Medway and at the Nore, (1747-1797)
- Commander-in-Chief Naval Home Command (CINCNAVHOME) (1969-2012)
- Commander-in-Chief, Newfoundland / Commodore-Governor (1729-1825)
- Commander in Chief, North Atlantic (1939–1945)
- Commander-in-Chief, The Nore (1745-1747), (1797-1834), (1899-1961)
- Commander-in-Chief, North America and West Indies, HQ Bermuda (from southern Brazil to Greenland) (1745–1956)
- Commander-in-Chief, Pacific HQ Valparaíso (1837–1865) Esquimalt (1865–1905)
- Commander-in-Chief, Portsmouth (1667-1969) - (merged with CinC Plymouth into CinCNAVHOME)
- Commander-in-Chief, Plymouth (1743-1845), (1896-1969) (merged with CinC Portsmouth into CinCNAVHOME)
- Commander-in-Chief, Queenstown (1848-1876)
- Commander-in-Chief, Royal Indian Navy (1947-1950)
- Commander-in-Chief, Rosyth, (1913-1919 and 1939–1946; was renamed Commander-in-Chief, Coast of Scotland from 1919 to 1939)
- Commander-in-Chief, Sheerness, (1834-1899)
- Commander-in-Chief, South America HQ Valparaíso (circa 1826–1837)
- Commander-in-Chief, South Atlantic and Pacific. Vice-Admiral Doveton Sturdee's title when sent south in 1914 to destroy the German East Asia Squadron after the Battle of Coronel. Resulted in the Battle of the Falkland Islands. Title never reused.
- Commander-in-Chief, South Atlantic HQ Freetown (1939–1958)
- Commander-in-Chief, South Atlantic and South America, (1958-1967)
- Commander-in-Chief, South East Coast of America HQ Falkland Islands (1838–1905)
- Commander-in-Chief, Thames, (1695-1696)
- Commander-in-Chief, Thames and Medway, (1707-1711)
- Commander-in-Chief, Thames, Medway and Nore, (1711-1745)
- Commander-in-Chief, Western Approaches - the area from west of Portland to Clyde, HQ Liverpool (1939–1945)
- Commander-in-Chief on the Lisbon Station - (1779-1841)

=== Admirals Commanding ===
- Admiral Commanding, Coastguard and Reserves, (1903-1923).
- Admiral Commanding, Reserves, (1923-1976)
- Admiral Commanding, Orkneys and Shetlands,(1914–1945), Admiral commanding was in charge of the Northern Patrol Force.
- Admiral Commanding Western Squadron (1650-1849)
- Admiral of Patrols, (1912-1916)
- Admiral Superintendent, Contract-Built Ships
- Admirals-Superintendent on the Clyde
- Admiral Superintendent, Chatham, (1832-1951)
- Admiral-Superintendent, Devonport, (1885-1930)
- Admiral-Superintendent of Esquimalt Dockyard, (1842 to 1905)
- Admiral-Superintendent, Gibraltar, (1898-1945)
- Admiral-Superintendent, Halifax Dockyard
- Admiral Superintendent, Malta, (1832-1934)
- Admiral Superintendent, Naval Reserves, (1875-1903)
- Admiral Superintendent, Plymouth, (1846-1970)
- Admiral-Superintendent, Portsmouth, (1832-1971)
- Admiral-Superintendent, Naval Reserves, (1874-1903)
- Admiral-Superintendent, Pembroke (1906-1915)
- Admiral-Superintendent, Rosyth, (1915-1971)
- Admiral, British Joint Services Mission, U.S.A, (1942-1997)
- Deputy Admiral Commanding Reserves, (1942-1946)

=== Vice-Admirals Commanding ===
- Vice-Admiral, Aircraft Carriers. World War II. Became Flag Officer Mediterranean Aircraft Carriers.
- Vice-Admiral Commanding, Light Forces, and Second-in-Command Mediterranean Fleet
- Vice-Admiral Commanding Second Division (1909-1912)
- Vice-Admiral Commanding, 3rd and 4th Divisions
- Vice-Admiral Commanding Western Squadron (1650-1849)
- Vice-Admiral Reserve Fleet Destroyers, (1939-1945)

The Vice-Naval Deputy to the Supreme Allied Commander Europe was not technically a Vice-Admiral Commanding.

=== Rear-Admirals Commanding ===
- Rear-Admiral, Aircraft Carriers, Pre World War II. Became Flag Officer, Mediterranean Aircraft Carriers.
- Rear-Admiral and Senior Officer, Dover (1917-1918)
- Rear-Admiral Commanding Destroyer Flotillas, Mediterranean Fleet
- Rear-Admiral, Scapa (responsible to the Admiral Commanding, Orkneys and Shetlands, during the Second World War)
- Rear-Admiral Commanding Dover Patrol (1914-1915)
- Rear-Admiral Commanding, Nore Reserve (1919-1922)
- Rear-Admiral Commanding Portsmouth Reserve (1919-1921)
- Rear-Admiral Commanding, Rosyth Reserve (1919-1938)
- Rear-Admiral Commanding, Harwich Force (1914-1919)
- Rear-Admiral Destroyers British Pacific Fleet
- Rear-Admiral in the 1st Division, Home Fleet, (1909-1912)
- Rear-Admiral in the 2nd Division, Home Fleet, (1909-1912)
- Rear-Admiral in the 3rd and 4th Divisions, Home Fleet (1909-1912)
- Rear Admiral, Naval Air Stations (1939-1945)
- Rear-Admiral, Second-in-Command, Atlantic Fleet (1904-1912)

=== Senior Officers, commanding ===
- Senior British Naval Officer, Suez Canal Area (1939-1942)
- Senior British Naval Officer, Western Atlantic (1942-1945)
- Senior Naval Officer, Mudros (1914–1919)
- Senior Naval Officer, Persian Gulf (1818-1972)
- Senior Naval Officer, Red Sea Force (1939-1941)
- Senior Naval Officer, West Indies (1956-1976)
- Senior Officer on the Coast of Ireland (1876-1915)
- Senior Officer, West Indies, (1854-1859)

== Flag Officers ==
=== Former Flag Officers ===
Included:

- Flag Officer Sea Training (1958 - 2020)
- Flag Officer, Administration
- Flag Officer, Aircraft Carriers – with variously up to 6–8 carriers in the 1950s/60s, was responsible for providing worked up carriers to the operational commands. Amalgamated with Flag Officer Amphibious Ships to become FOCAS towards the end of the 1960s, after the cancellation of CVA-01. H. R. B. Janvrin, DSC, ADC, was promoted to rear admiral and succeeded Rear Admiral D. C. E. F. Gibson, DSC, as FOAC.
- Flag Officer, Air, Far East – existing until 1945–47. In late 1946, HMS Theseus sailed out from the UK to Singapore as the flagship of Flag Officer Air, Far East. After her arrival, she became flagship of the 1st Aircraft Carrier Squadron.
- Flag Officer, Air, Home – Flew flag from RNAS Lee-on-Solent (HMS Daedalus) in the 1930s, post extant until 1963. Responsible for shore-based air command working up squadrons to operational effectiveness, and after an Operational Readiness Inspection, delivering them to the Fleet. RA Sir Cloudesley Robinson KCB (1 Jan 1945 – June 1945), VA Sir Dennis Boyd KCB CBE DSC (1 June 1945 – April 1946). Admiral Walter Couchman 1957–60.
- Flag Officer, Air and Second-in-Command, Mediterranean Fleet (1947-1958) – Admiral Ralph Edwards in the late 1940s. Vice Admiral William Davis, 1952–54. Flag Officer Second-in-Command Mediterranean – F.O.2 i/c MED. In 1951 Rear Admiral G. Grantham, CB, CBE, DSO. Responsible for Mediterranean Fleet aircraft carriers, and, under Captain, Air, Mediterranean, the naval air stations in Malta. Vice-Admiral R A B Edwards (Flag Officer, Second-in-Command Mediterranean), May 1952.
- Flag Officer, Air, Pacific Fleet
- Flag Officer, Air, Mediterranean Fleet
- Flag Officer Admiralty Interview Board – FOAIB
- Flag Officer Attached Middle East – FOAM – Rear Admiral H T Baillie-Grohman, 1941
- Flag Officer, Ceylon - FOCEY - (1942-1945)
- Flag Officer Commanding HM's Australian Fleet – FOCAF – 1911–88
- Flag Officer Commanding, British Naval Forces Germany
- Flag Officer Commanding, Royal Indian Navy, (1928-1950)
- Flag Officer, Carriers and Amphibious Ships – FOCAS, succeeded by Flag Officer Third Flotilla - (1971-1979)
- Flag Officer, Carrier Training and Administration - Vice Admiral Lumley Lyster 1943-1945
- Flag Officer Dover
- Flag Officer, East Africa
- Flag Officer, Flying Training,
- Flag Officer First Flotilla – FOF1 – Cold War – (1971-1990). Rear Admiral David Halifax 1980–82. Rear Admiral Sandy Woodward, FOF 1, commanded the Carrier Group (CTG 317.8) of the Falklands War task force.
- Flag Officer Flotillas, Home Fleet – deployed on the Spring cruise, 1955, under Rear Admiral J.W. Cuthbert. Vice Admiral Richard Onslow in 1955–56. Flew flag in HMS Tyne, July 1960–March 1961.
- Flag Officer Flotillas, Mediterranean Fleet – May 1952 Vice-Admiral F R Parham.
- Flag Officer Flotillas, Western Fleet 1967-71
- Flag Officer Force A
- Flag Officer Force B
- Flag Officer Force C
- Flag Officer Force D
- Flag Officer Force E
- Flag Officer Force F
- Flag Officer Force G
- Flag Officer Force H
- Flag Officer Force I
- Flag Officer Force J
- Flag Officer Force K
- Flag Officer Force L
- Flag Officer Force M
- Flag Officer Force N
- Flag Officer Force Q
- Flag Officer Force R
- Flag Officer Force X
- Flag Officer Force Y
- Flag Officer Force Z
- Flag Officer Gibraltar (FOGIB) (1902–39, 1946–92)
- Flag Officer, Gibraltar and North Atlantic (1939–43). Also reported as FOC North Atlantic; (northern Portugal – northern Morocco – Atlantic). Admiral Dudley North commanded the station during the Attack on Mers-el-Kébir, the destruction of the French fleet in 1940.
- Flag Officer, Gibraltar and Mediterranean Approaches (1943-1946)
- Flag Officer, Ground Training
- Flag Officer Malaya - (1939-1941)
- Flag Officer, Malaya and Forward Areas- (1945-1955)
- Flag Officer, Malayan Area, by 1956 occupied by Rear Admiral George Thring.
- Flag Officer Maritime Aviation/AOC No. 3 Group RAF, 2000–2003. Superseded by Rear Admiral Fleet Air Arm who is not a Flag Officer.
- Flag Officer, Malta – FO Malta (1934–43, 1946–79).
- Flag Officer, Malta and Central Mediterranean (1943–46)
- Flag Officer, Medway – FOMDY (1961-1984)
- Flag Officer, Mediterranean Aircraft Carriers (1940 to 1943)
- Flag Officer, Middle East – Rear Admiral Patrick Brock 1954–56, responsible for Ismailia and Cyprus. Brock was appointed Flag Officer, Middle East in April 1954, initially with his headquarters at Fayid, in the Suez Canal Zone. However, after Britain agreed to remove its forces from the Canal Zone, his staff moved to Episkopi, in southern Cyprus, in December 1954. Hauled down flag March 1956. Rear Admiral Peter Howes 1964–66. Directed the Beira Patrol. 1968 withdrew from HMS Sheba in Aden.
- Flag Officer Naval Air Command (FONAC) (1963-1993)- superseded by FONA.
- Flag Officer Naval Aviation – FONA (1993 - 2000) Fleet Air Arm (superseded by Flag Officer Maritime Aviation (FOMA))
- Flag Officer, Naval Flying Training – FONFT. Created 30 September 1963 as renaming of Flag Officer Flying Training.
- Flag Officer Plymouth - (1969-1996)
- Flag Officer Portsmouth – FOP, 1975-1993
- Flag Officer, Portsmouth Area, 1969-1975
- Flag Officer, Red Sea
- Flag Officer, Maritime Reserves - FORes (2005-2015)
- Flag Officer Scotland, Northern England and Northern Ireland - FOSNNI. Changed title to FOSNI when (briefly) combined with FOST in 2011-12 and new title (without Northern England) remained extant when re-established as separate post.
- Flag Officer Rosyth – FOR
- Flag Officer, Royal Yachts – FORY, (1864-1997)
- Flag Officer Scotland & Northern Ireland - FOSNI, unfilled
- Flag Officer Scotland, Northern England, Northern Ireland - FOSNNI
- Flag Officer Sea Training (Submarines) - (1958-1999)
- Flag Officer, Second Flotilla – FOF2 (1971-1992) Admiral William Staveley had this command in the 1970s.
- Flag Officer Second in Command Far East Fleet – FO2FEF, to 1971
- Flag Officer, Spithead and Admiral Superintendent, Portsmouth, 1969-1971
- Flag Officer, Spithead and Port Admiral, Portsmouth, 1971-1975
- Flag Officer Submarines (FOSM). Succeeded by Rear-Admiral, Submarines.
- Flag Officer Surface Flotilla – FOSF – 1992–2000s
- Flag Officer, Third Flotilla – (FOF3), 1979–1992. Vice Admiral Derek Reffell in 1982. Vice Admiral Richard Fitch was Flag Officer, Third Flotilla and Commander, Anti-Submarine Group Two (NATO SACLANT Striking Fleet Atlantic) 1983–85; Vice Admiral Julian Oswald held this position from 1987.
- Flag Officer, Training and Recruitment - FOTR. Merged with FOST in 2005.
- Flag Officer, Training Squadron,
- Flag Officer, Yangtse Flotilla - (1937-1941)

== Commodores in command appointments ==
Included:Current Commodores, flying Broad Pennants in Command

- Commander Amphibious Task Group - COMATG
- Commander British Forces, Gibraltar
- Commander UK Carrier Strike Group -COMCSG
- Commander Surface Flotilla
- Commander Submarine Flotilla
- Commander UK Maritime Component Command, Bahrain (UKMCC)
- Naval Base Commander, HMNB Portsmouth
- Naval Base Commander, HMNB Devonport
- Naval Base Commander, HMNB Clyde
- Commanding Officer, RNAS Yeovilton
- Commander Maritime Reserves - COMMARRES (flies blue broad pennant of an RNR Officer)
- Commodore of the Royal Fleet Auxiliary - COMRFA (flies blue RFA broad pennant)

Selection of current Commodores, not entitled to fly a Broad Pennant

- Commodore, Head Defence Maritime Regulator, Defence Safety Agency
- Commodore, Operational Training
- Commodore, Assistant Chief of Staff Carrier Strike and Aviation

=== Former Commodore command appointments ===
Included:

- Commodore Air Train, British Pacific Fleet (COMAT/BPF) - 1945
- Commodore, Amphibious Warfare - COMAW or COM(AW)
- Commodore, Commander Naval Forces Gulf
- Commander UK Task Group (COMUKTG) - 2001-2011
- Commander, Devonport Flotilla COMDEVFLOT - (2002-2020)
- Commander, Faslane Flotilla COMFASFLOT - (2011-2020)
- Commodore Commanding 12th Cruiser Squadron
- Commodore Commanding Cruiser Squadron, (1899-1902)
- Commodore Commanding Landing Craft Bases
- Commodore Commanding Mine-Countermeasures Flotilla - (1971-1999)
- Commodore Commanding New Zealand Squadron, March 1921 - October 1940. HQ Auckland, commanding naval forces in New Zealand. Commodore's appointment abolished and forces brought directly under CNS from October 1940. The operational authority was the Commodore, Auckland, from 1961 which changed to the Maritime Commander in March 1993. Alternately rendered as Commodore Commanding, New Zealand Station, HQ Auckland, (1919–1941).
- Commodore Commanding Pakistan Flotilla
- Commodore Commanding South American Division
- Commodore Commanding South American Division of the America and West Indies Squadron
- Commodore Commanding South East Coast of America,
- Commodore Eastern Fleet Destroyer Flotilla
- Commodore Fleet Train, British Pacific Fleet (COFT/BPF) - 1945
- Commodore for Flotilla Duties, Gibraltar
- Commodore, Royal Naval Barracks, Chatham - (1904-1969)
- Commodore, Royal Naval Barracks, Devonport - (1902-1969)
- Commodore-in-Charge and Commodore Superintendent, HM Dockyard, Simonstown
- Commodore-in-Charge, Naval Air Stations, Eastern Stations
- Commodore-in-Charge, Hamburg
- Commodore in Charge, HM Australian Naval Establishments, Sydney
- Commodore in Charge, Hong Kong
- Commodore in Charge, Jamaica
- Commodore-in-Charge, Naval Air Stations, Ceylon
- Commodore, Malaya
- Commodore, Naval Air Stations, East Africa
- Commodore, Naval Air Stations, North
- Commodore, Naval Aviation
- Commodore of Convoys
- Commodore Royal Naval Reserve - Cdre RNR
- Commodore Royal Yachts
- Commodore Superintendent, Taranto RN Base (1945)
- Senior Naval Officer West Indies - SNOWI

== Senior Royal Marines appointments ==
The Royal Marines are part of the Naval Service

- Commandant General Royal Marines (and Commander UK Amphibious Forces) - CGRM
- Commander UK Commando Force

=== Former Royal Marines appointments ===
- Major General Royal Marines Commando Forces - MGRM Cdo Forces
- Major General Royal Marines Training - MGRM Trng
- Commander 3 Commando Brigade

== Squadrons and flotillas ==
- Commander, Flying Squadron (1869-1870)
- Commander, Detached Squadron (1870-1882)
- Commander, Particular Service Squadron (1882-1896)
- Commander, Home Fleet Destroyers (1908-1967)
- Commander Mediterranean Fleet Destroyers (1922-1965)
- New Zealand Division of the Royal Navy (1921-1940)
- Commander, Pacific Fleet Destroyers (1945-1946)
- Vice-Admiral Commanding, Channel Squadron
- 3rd and 4th Divisions (Royal Navy) (1909-1912)
- Rear-Admiral, 1st Aircraft Carrier Squadron
- 3rd Aircraft Carrier Squadron (1948-1954)
- 11th Aircraft Carrier Squadron
- 1st Battle Squadron (1912-1914, 1916–1924, 1926–1938, 1939, 1940, 1941–1945)
- 2nd Battle Squadron (1912-1921, 1937–1939, 1941–1944)
- 3rd Battle Squadron (1912-1918, 1925–1926, 1927–1928, 1942-1945 (also as North Atlantic Escort Force))
- 4th Battle Squadron (1912-1915, 1918, 1919–1924)
- 5th Battle Squadron (Vice Admiral commanding 1913–1914, 1914–1915; also 1914–1919)
- 6th Battle Squadron (1913-1917)
- 7th Battle Squadron (1912-1914)
- 8th Battle Squadron (1912-1914)
- 9th Battle Squadron (1914)
- 1st Battlecruiser Squadron (1915-1919)
- 2nd Battlecruiser Squadron (1915-1919)
- 3rd Battlecruiser Squadron (1915-1916)
- Battlecruiser Squadron (1919-1923, 1938–1941))
- Training Squadron (1885-1899)
- Cruiser Squadron (1900-1905)
- 1st Cruiser Squadron (1905-1918, 1924–33, 1940–43, 1946–48, 1950–51)
- 2nd Cruiser Squadron (1905–14, 1916–17, 1918–19, 1921–31, 1932–34, 1936–38, 1940–41, 1946–48, 1949–50))
- 3rd Cruiser Squadron (1902-1916, 1922–31, 1932–41)
- 4th Cruiser Squadron (1905-1918)
- 5th Cruiser Squadron (1907-1915)
- 6th Cruiser Squadron (1909-1915)
- 7th Cruiser Squadron (1914-1916)(1913-1941)
- 9th Cruiser Squadron (1914-1919)
- 10th Cruiser Squadron (1914-1917)
- 11th Cruiser Squadron (1914-1915)
- 12th Cruiser Squadron (1914-1915)
- 18th Cruiser Squadron
- Rear-Admiral Commanding, 1st Light Cruiser Squadron, (1917-1924)
- Rear-Admiral Commanding, 2nd Light Cruiser Squadron, (1914–15, 1918–31, 1932–34, 1936–38, 1940–41
- Rear-Admiral Commanding, 3rd Light Cruiser Squadron, (1915-1919, 1921–1931, 1932–1938)
- Rear-Admiral Commanding, 4th Light Cruiser Squadron, (1918-1919)

== See also ==
- Bibliography of 18th-19th century Royal Naval history
