= List of squadrons and flotillas of the Royal Navy =

This is a List of squadrons and flotillas of the Royal Navy.

== Type squadrons ==
=== Aircraft carriers ===
==== Numbered ====
- 1st Aircraft Carrier Squadron – British Pacific Fleet, East Indies Fleet (1945–1947)
- 2nd Aircraft Carrier Squadron – Mediterranean Fleet
- 3rd Aircraft Carrier Squadron – listed in Flight, 20 April 1951, p. 483 with Home Fleet. Commanded at the time by then Rear-Admiral Caspar John.
- 11th Aircraft Carrier Squadron – Rear Admiral Cecil Harcourt hoisted his flag in HMS Colossus in August 1945, commanding the 11th Aircraft Carrier Squadron (HMS Colossus, HMS Venerable, HMS Vengeance, and HMS Glory). This force was sent to re-occupy Hong Kong.
- 21st Aircraft Carrier Squadron – Eastern Fleet, East Indies Fleet
- 30th Aircraft Carrier Squadron – Fleet Train, British Pacific Fleet, August 1945.

==== Named ====
- East Indies and Egypt Seaplane Squadron, (1916–1918) was the Royal Navy's first carrier squadron.

=== Battleships ===
- 1st Battle Squadron-1914 Grand Fleet
- 2nd Battle Squadron-1914 Grand Fleet, 1919 Atlantic Fleet. 1932 Home Fleet
- 3rd Battle Squadron-1914 Grand Fleet, 1919 Atlantic Fleet, 1932 Home Fleet
- 4th Battle Squadron-1914 Grand Fleet
- 5th Battle Squadron-1914 Grand Fleet
- 6th Battle Squadron-1914 Grand Fleet
- 7th Battle Squadron-1912–1914 Third Fleet
- 8th Battle Squadron-1912–1914 Third Fleet
- 9th Battle Squadron-1914 Grand Fleet

=== Battlecruisers ===
- 1st Battlecruiser Squadron-1913 Grand Fleet.
- 2nd Battlecruiser Squadron-1914 Mediterranean Fleet, 1915 Grand Fleet.
- 3rd Battlecruiser Squadron-1915 Grand Fleet
- British Battlecruiser Squadron-1919–1932 Atlantic Fleet-1932 Home Fleet.

=== Cruisers ===
Starting around the time that steam cruisers became popular in the 1870s, the Royal Navy tended to organise such ships into groups called Cruiser Squadrons. Squadrons were commanded by a rear-admiral whose title was given as Flag Officer Cruiser Squadron n, or CSn for short (e.g. the officer commanding the 3rd Cruiser Squadron would be CS3).

During peacetime the grouping was primarily for administrative purposes, but during war the whole squadron tended to be operated as a unified fighting unit and such units would train in this formation during peace. In the main fighting fleets (Home Fleet and Mediterranean Fleet) members of a given squadron were normally of the same or similar classes. The use of Cruiser Squadrons died out as the number of such ships decreased following World War II.

- 1st Cruiser Squadron-1939 Mediterranean Fleet, Second World War and afterwards – Mountbatten?
- 2nd Cruiser Squadron -1914 Grand Fleet, HMS Minotaur, HMS Hampshire, HMS Shannon, and HMS Cochrane. 1932 Home Fleet in the interwar period. HMS Dorsetshire, HMS York and HMS Exeter in 1932.
- 3rd Cruiser Squadron – Mediterranean Fleet
- 4th Cruiser Squadron:- 1939 East Indies Station HMS Gloucester, HMS Liverpool, HMS Manchester; 1945 British Pacific Fleet HMS Swiftsure, HMS Argonaut, HMS Black Prince, HMS Euryalus, HMNZS Gambia
- 5th Cruiser Squadron-1939 China Station HMS Cornwall HMS Dorsetshire HMS Kent HMS Birmingham. Post World War II Flag Officer Commanding was for a period an additional appointment for Flag Officer Second in Command Far East Fleet.
- 6th Cruiser Squadron, also known as Mediterranean Cruiser Squadron, (1909–1915), (1925–1942) deployments -1939 South Atlantic Station
- 7th Cruiser Squadron, also known as Cruiser Force C, (1912–1914) deployments -1940 Mediterranean Fleet HMS Gloucester, HMS Neptune, HMS Orion, HMAS Sydney, and HMS Liverpool. On 21 June 1940, Bardia was bombarded by the 7th Cruiser Squadron of the Mediterranean Fleet. The bombardment force consisted of the French battleship Lorraine, British cruisers HMS Orion and HMS Neptune, the Australia cruiser HMAS Sydney, and the destroyers HMS Dainty, Decoy, Hasty, and HMAS Stuart. However the bombardment is reported to have only caused minimal damage.
- 8th Cruiser Squadron, (1912–1914, (1924/25-1942) deployments-1939 West Indies Station
- 9th Cruiser Squadron -also known as Cruiser Force I, (1913–1919), (1940)
- 10th Cruiser Squadron – First World War operated Northern Patrol checking trade routes to Germany
- 11th Cruiser Squadron also known as Cruiser Force B – (1912–1917)
- 12th Cruiser Squadron also known as Cruiser Force G – (1914–1915), (1939–1943)
- 15th Cruiser Squadron, (1940–1946) Components in 1942 Mediterranean Fleet HMS Cleopatra, Arethusa, Dido, Euryalus and Orion
- 18th Cruiser Squadron, (1939–1942). Deployments -1939 Home Fleet. Home Fleet/Nore 1940 – War Diary March–May 1940

=== Light Cruisers ===
- 1st Light Cruiser Squadron (United Kingdom)
- 2nd Light Cruiser Squadron (United Kingdom)
- 3rd Light Cruiser Squadron (United Kingdom)
- 4th Light Cruiser Squadron (United Kingdom)
- 5th Light Cruiser Squadron (United Kingdom)
- 6th Light Cruiser Squadron (United Kingdom)
- 7th Light Cruiser Squadron (United Kingdom)

=== Defence boats ===
- British 1st Seaward Defence Boat Squadron

=== Destroyers ===
- 1st Destroyer Squadron (United Kingdom)
- 2nd Destroyer Squadron (United Kingdom)
- 3rd Destroyer Squadron (United Kingdom)
- 4th Destroyer Squadron (United Kingdom)
- 5th Destroyer Squadron (United Kingdom)
- 6th Destroyer Squadron (United Kingdom)
- 7th Destroyer Squadron (United Kingdom)
- 8th Destroyer Squadron (United Kingdom)

=== Escorts ===
- British 21st Escort Squadron
- British 22nd Escort Squadron
- British 23rd Escort Squadron
- British 24th Escort Squadron
- British 25th Escort Squadron
- British 26th Escort Squadron
- British 27th Escort Squadron
- British 28th Escort Squadron
- British 29th Escort Squadron
- British 30th Escort Squadron

=== Fast patrol boats ===
- Coastal Forces Squadron formerly British 1st Fast Patrol Boat Squadron
- British 2nd Fast Patrol Boat Squadron
- 1st Patrol Boat Squadron – formerly the Inshore Training Squadron – renamed Coastal Forces Squadron circa June 2020, seemingly with HMS Smiter (P272).

=== Fisheries ===
- Overseas Patrol Squadron (formerly the Fisheries Patrol Squadron)

=== Frigates ===
- 1st Frigate Squadron
- 2nd Frigate Squadron
- 3rd Frigate Squadron – postwar, was with Far East Fleet, at Singapore and Hong Kong. Flag at one point in HMS Loch Killisport. On 21 November 1960, the 3rd Frigate Squadron, together for the last time, shaped course for Singapore.
- 4th Frigate Squadron, from January 1949 with Far East Fleet, including HMS Cardigan Bay (K630), HMS Morecambe Bay, and HMS Mounts Bay. Made up of Amazon class frigates in the 1980s.
- 5th Frigate Squadron
- 6th Frigate Squadron
- 7th Frigate Squadron
- 8th Frigate Squadron
- 9th Frigate Squadron
- 17th Frigate Squadron
- 20th Frigate Squadron – anti-submarine warfare training squadron based in Londonderry Port during the 1960s.

=== Heavy ===
- Heavy Squadron, (1951–1954) consisted of mixed naval units including the battleship, aircraft carriers and cruisers of the Home fleet.

=== Minesweepers ===
==== Coastal minesweepers ====
- British 100th Minesweeper Squadron
- British 101st Minesweeper Squadron
- British 105th Minesweeper Squadron
- British 106th Minesweeper Squadron
- British 108th Minesweeper Squadron
- British 120th Minesweeper Squadron Hong Kong 1951–1962

==== Fleet minesweepers ====
- British 1st Minesweeper Squadron
- British 2nd Minesweeper Squadron
- British 3rd Minesweeper Squadron
- British 4th Minesweeper Squadron
- British 5th Minesweeper Squadron
- British 6th Minesweeper Squadron

==== Inshore minesweepers ====
- British 50th Minesweeper Squadron
- British 51st Minesweeper Squadron
- British 52nd Minesweeper Squadron
- British 232nd Minesweeper Squadron

==== Mine counter-measures ====
- 1st Mine Counter-Measures Squadron
- 2nd Mine Counter-Measures Squadron
- 3rd Mine Counter-Measures Squadron
- 5th Mine Counter-Measures Squadron
- 6th Mine Counter-Measures Squadron
- 7th Mine Counter-Measures Squadron
- 8th Mine Counter-Measures Squadron Hong Kong 1962–1967
- 9th Mine Counter-Measures Squadron Persian Gulf 1962–1971 & 2013–present
- 10th Mine Counter-Measures Squadron
- 11th Mine Counter-Measures Squadron Falklands Conflict 1982

=== Submarines ===
- 1st Submarine Squadron (United Kingdom) (SM1) – HMS Dolphin, Gosport.
- 2nd Submarine Squadron (United Kingdom) – HMNB Devonport, Plymouth.
- 3rd Submarine Squadron (United Kingdom) – HMNB Clyde, Faslane, until amalgamated with SM10 in 1993 to become 1st Submarine Squadron.
- 4th Submarine Squadron (United Kingdom) – with China Station 1939. With headquarters at Singapore, the then-named Fourth Submarine Flotilla comprised Rorqual, Grampus, Regent, Rover, Parthian, Olympus, Proteus, Regulus, Rainbow, Phoenix, Perseus, Pandora Orpheus, Odin, and Otus. Trincomalee May 1944, Perth, Australia, after October 1944 supported by the depot ship HMS Adamant. Australia postwar (decision to host flotilla seems to have been made in 1949). The 4th Submarine Squadron, which included "T" class submarines, was disbanded on 10 January 1969 when the 1st Australian Submarine Squadron comprising HMAS Otway and HMAS Oxley was founded. HMS Trump departed Sydney for the United Kingdom that day.
- 5th Submarine Squadron (United Kingdom) – Malta.
- 6th Submarine Squadron (United Kingdom) alternately rendered as 6th Submarine Division – Halifax, Nova Scotia.
- 7th Submarine Squadron (United Kingdom) – Singapore.
- 10th Submarine Squadron (United Kingdom) (SM10) – 30 November 1959, reformed at Singapore. Strategic nuclear missile submarines based HMNB Clyde, Faslane, until amalgamated into 1st Submarine Squadron, 1993.

=== Training ===
- Inshore Training Squadron – renamed the 1st Patrol Boat Squadron in 2002.
- British 2nd Training Squadron
- British 3rd Training Squadron
- British 4th Training Squadron
- Training Squadron, Home Fleet

== Type flotillas ==
=== Destroyers ===
See Pennant number#Flotilla bands

- 1st Destroyer Flotilla, deployments:
  - 1907– 1909, Channel Fleet.
  - 1909–1912, Home Fleet, 1st Division
  - 1912–1914, 1st Fleet
  - 1914–1916, Grand Fleet
  - 1916–1918, Harwich Force
  - 1917–1918, Portsmouth Command
  - 1919–1925, Atlantic Fleet
  - April 1925 until November 1939 renamed 5th Destroyer Flotilla in December 1939 is re-formed as 1st Destroyer Flotilla from 22nd Destroyer Flotilla.
  - December 1939 – June 1940, Nore Command
  - July 1940 – May 1945, Portsmouth Command
  - September 1939 – December 1944, Mediterranean Fleet flotilla is assigned from its permanent commands to Mediterranean fleet.
- 2nd Destroyer Flotilla, deployments:
  - 1907–1909, Home Fleet
  - 1909–1912, Home Fleet, 2nd Division
  - 1912–1914, 1st Fleet
  - 1914–1916, Grand Fleet
  - 1916–1917, Plymouth Command-Devonport
  - 1917–1918, Coast of Ireland Station-Londonderry
  - 1919–1924, Atlantic Fleet
  - 1924–1932, Mediterranean Fleet
  - 1932–1936, Home Fleet
  - 1936 – September 1939, Mediterranean Fleet
  - September 1939 – May 1940 - Dispersed to South Atlantic & West Indies
  - June 1940 – February 1942, Mediterranean Fleet
  - 1942 – 1943, Eastern Fleet
- 3rd Destroyer Flotilla: (1910–1945)
  - 1939 Mediterranean Fleet HMS Inglefield' (F)
    - 5th Destroyer Division HMS Ilex, HMS Isis, HMS Imperial, HMS Imogen
    - 6th Destroyer Division HMS Ivanhoe, HMS Impulsive, HMS Intrepid, HMS Icarus
  - 1954 Home Fleet HMS St. Kitts
- 4th Destroyer Flotilla: (1910–1940)
  - 1939 Mediterranean Fleet HMS Afridi (F)
    - 7th Destroyer Division HMS Afridi, HMS Gurkha, HMS Mohawk, HMS Sikh
    - 8th Destroyer Division HMS Cossack, HMS Maori, HMS Nubian, HMS Zulu
  - 1945 British Pacific Fleet HMAS Quickmatch, HMAS Quiberon, HMAS Queenborough, HMS Quality.
  - 1951 Home Fleet HMS Agincourt
- 5th Destroyer Flotilla: 1932 Home Fleet (1910–1933)
  - 1948 Home Fleet HMS St. Kitts
- 6th Destroyer Flotilla: (1912–1943)–1932 Home Fleet; 1939 Home Fleet HMS Somali
  - 1939 11th Destroyer Division HMS Matabele, HMS Ashanti, HMS Mashona, HMS Somali(F)
  - 1939 12th Destroyer Division HMS Punjabi, HMS Tarter, HMS Bedouin, HMS Eskimo
- 7th Destroyer Flotilla: (1912–1944) – 1941 British Eastern Fleet HMAS Norman, HMAS Napier, HMAS Nestor and HMAS Nizam.
- 8th Destroyer Flotilla:
  - 1939 Home Fleet; HMS Faulknor
    - 1939 15th Destroyer Division HMS Foxhound, HMS Fearless, HMS Fury, HMS Forester
    - 1939 16th Destroyer Division HMS Foresight, HMS Fortune, HMS Fame, HMS Firedrake
  - 1940 Force H HMS Faulknor, HMS Forester, HMS Foresight, HMS Firedrake, HMS Fortune, HMS Fearless, HMS Fury, HMS Foxhound
- 9th Destroyer Flotilla:
- 10th Destroyer Flotilla:1940 Mediterranean Fleet
  - 19th Destroyer Division (Scrap Iron Flotilla) HMAS Stuart, HMAS Vampire, HMAS Voyager, HMAS Vendetta, HMAS Waterhen
  - 20th Destroyer Division HMS Dainty, HMS Diamond, HMS Decoy, HMS Defender
- 11th Destroyer Flotilla: 1939 Home Fleet HMS Vanquisher, HMS Vansittart, HMS Vimy, HMS Walker, HMS Warwick, HMS Whirlwind and HMS Winchelsea
- 12th Destroyer Flotilla
- 13th Destroyer Flotilla
- 14th Destroyer Flotilla:1942 Mediterranean Fleet HMS Jervis, Javelin, Kelvin, Nubian, Pakenham, Paladin and Petard
- 15th Destroyer Flotilla
  - 1939 Rosyth Command
    - 29th Destroyer Division HMS Broke, HMS Wanderer, HMS Whitehall, HMS Witch
    - 30th Destroyer Division HMS Wolverine, HMS Witherington, HMSVolunteer, HMS Verity
- 16th Destroyer Flotilla 1939 Portsmouth Command
- 17th Destroyer Flotilla
- 18th Destroyer Flotilla 1939 Home Fleet HMS Kempenfelt(1939–1939 (transferred to RCN)
- 19th Destroyer Flotilla:
  - 1939 Nore Command HMS Codrington (F)
    - 37th Destroyer Division HMS Basilisk, HMS Beagle, HMS Boreas
    - 38th Destroyer Division HMS Blanche, HMS Brazen, HMS Brilliant, HMS Boadicea
  - 1940 Force H HMS Lagos, HMS Laforey, HMS Lightning, HMS Lance, HMS Lively
  - 1945 to 1946 HMS Trafalgar (flotilla leader), HMS Armada, HMS Barfleur, HMS Hogue, HMS Lagos, HMS Camperdown and HMS Finisterre.
- 20th Destroyer Flotilla
- 21st Destroyer Flotilla:1939 China Station HMS Duncan, HMS Decoy, HMS Defender, HMS Delight, HMS Duchess, HMS Dainty, HMS Daring, HMS Diamond and HMS Diana
- 22nd Destroyer Flotilla
- 23rd Destroyer Flotilla: formerly French small destroyers Bouclier, Branlebas, L'Incomprise, La Cordeliere, La Flore, La Melpomène
- 24th Destroyer Flotilla
- 25th Destroyer Flotilla: 1945 British Pacific Fleet HMS Grenville, HMS Ulster, HMS Undine, HMS Urania, HMS Undaunted, HMS Ursa, HMS Ulysses, HMS Urchin
- 26th Destroyer Flotilla: 1945 British Eastern Fleet HMS Saumarez, HMS Verulam, HMS Venus and HMS Virago
- 27th Destroyer Flotilla: 1945 British Pacific Fleet HMS Kempenfelt, HMS Wager, HMS Wakeful, HMS Wessex, HMS Whelp, HMS Whirlwind, HMS Wizard.
- 28th Destroyer Flotilla:
- 29th Destroyer Flotilla:

=== Escorts ===
- British 1st Escort Flotilla
- British 2nd Escort Flotilla
- British 3rd Escort Flotilla
- British 4th Escort Flotilla
- British 5th Escort Flotilla

=== Local defences ===
Included:

- 2nd Submarine Flotilla, (1914–1919)
- Clyde Local Defence flotilla (1914–1916)
- Devonport Local Defence flotilla (1914–1919)
- Devonport & Falmouth Local Defence flotilla
- Falmouth Local Defence flotilla (1915–1918)
- Firth of Forth Local Defence flotilla
- Gibraltar Local Defence flotilla
- Liverpool Local Defence flotilla
- Mersey Local Defence flotilla
- Newhaven Local Defence flotilla
- Nore Local Defence flotilla (1914–1919)
- North Channel Local Defence flotilla
- Milford & Pembroke Local Defence flotilla
- Pembroke Local Defence flotilla (1917–1919)
- Portland Local Defence flotilla
- Portsmouth Local Defence flotilla
- Queenstown Local Defence flotilla (1914–1915)

=== Minesweepers ===
- 1st Minesweeper Flotilla
- 2nd Minesweeper Flotilla
- 3rd Minesweeper Flotilla
- 4th Minesweeper Flotilla
- 5th Minesweeper Flotilla
  - 1939 Nore Command: HMS Sphinx, HMS Niger, HMS Salamander, HMS Harrier, HMS Hussar, HMS Skipjack, HMS Halcyon, HMS Selkirk, HMS Speedwell
- 6th Minesweeper Flotilla
  - 1939 Nore Command: HMS Syringa, HMS Cypress, HMS Cedar, HMS Holly
- 7th Minesweeper Flotilla
- 8th Minesweeper Flotilla
- 9th Minesweeper Flotilla
- 10th Minesweeper Flotilla
- 11th Minesweeper Flotilla
- 13th Minesweeper Flotilla
- 14th Minesweeper Flotilla
- 14th & 17th Minesweeper Flotilla, (1942–1944)
- 15th Minesweeper Flotilla Chatham February 1944
- 18th Minesweeper Flotilla Chatham May 1943
- 21st Minesweeper Flotilla
- 40th Minesweeper Flotilla Harwich 1945
- 44nd Minesweeper Flotilla

=== Motor torpedo boats ===
- British 2nd MTB Flotilla
- British 10th MTB Flotilla
- British 58th MTB Flotilla

=== Port ===
- Portsmouth Flotilla, (2002–present)
- Devonport Flotilla, (2002–present)
- Faslane Flotilla, (2010–present) – in 2015 the remaining Trafalgar-class submarines of the Devonport Flotilla were administratively transferred to the Faslane Flotilla.

=== Submarine flotilla ===
==== numbered ====
- 1st Submarine Flotilla,
- 2nd Submarine Flotilla, (1914–1919)
- 3rd Submarine Flotilla, (1914–1919)
- 4th Submarine Flotilla, (1914–1919), (1939): Medway, Westcott, Grampus, Rorqual, Odin, Otus, Olympus, Parthian, Regent, Rover, Orpheus, Pandora, Perseus, Phoenix, Rainbow, Regulus, Proteus
- 5th Submarine Flotilla, (1914–1919)
- 6th Submarine Flotilla, (1914–1919)
- 7th Submarine Flotilla, (1914–1919) later part of Commander-in-Chief, South Atlantic. At Freetown, Sierra Leone, 3 September 1939, comprised HMS Clyde and HMS Severn.
- 8th Submarine Flotilla, (1914–1919)
- 9th Submarine Flotilla, (1914–1919)
- 10th Submarine Flotilla, (1914–1919), based in Malta from January 1941
- 11th Submarine Flotilla, (1914–1919)
- 12th Submarine Flotilla, (1914–1919)
- 13th Submarine Flotilla, (1914–1919)
- 14th Submarine Flotilla, (1917–1919)
- 15th Submarine Flotilla, (1914–1919)
- 16th Submarine Flotilla, (1914–1919)

==== named ====
- Ambrose's Flotilla, (1917–1918)
- Mediterranean Fleet's Flotilla
- Platypus's Flotilla, (1917–1919)
- Vulcan's Flotilla, (1917–1919)
- Hong Kong Submarine Flotilla, (1914)

=== Training flotilla ===
- British 2nd Training Flotilla

== Sources ==
- Mackie, Colin. (2017) Senior Royal Navy Appointments from 1865. Gulabin, http://www.gulabin.com/
- Nierhorster, Leo Dr. (2013) World War II Armed Forces – Orders of Battle and Organizations – British, Colonial, and Dominion Armed Forces – British, Colonial, and Dominion Navies. http://niehorster.org/index.htm
- Watson, Graham. "Royal Navy Organisation and Ship Deployment 1947–2013". naval-history.net. Gordon Smith, 12 July 2015.
