= 3rd and 4th Divisions =

- Active: March 1909–May 1912
- Country: United Kingdom
- Branch: Royal Navy
- Type: Division

The 3rd and 4th Divisions was a naval formation of the Home Fleet, Royal Navy. It was created before the First World War from March 1909 until May 1912.

In March 1909, following a Royal Navy re-organisation, the Channel Fleet was absorbed by the Home Fleet. The ships in home waters, including the former Channel Fleet, then became the Home Fleet's First and Second Divisions. The former Home Fleet as it then stood became the Third and Fourth Divisions, which was actually a single formation under a vice-admiral. These new divisions was made up of an 8-12 ship battle squadron that included either dreadnought battleships or pre-dreadnought battleships. Within the Home Fleet there were two levels of availability - the ships of the 1st and 2nd Divisions which were fully operational, and those of the 3rd and 4th divisions that were either in reserve or partially manned.

== Vice-Admirals Commanding 3rd and 4th Divisions ==
Post holders included:

#	Rank	Flag	Name	Term
Vice-Admirals Commanding Third and Fourth Divisions
1	Vice-Admiral	Vice-Admiral - Royal Navy	Sir George Neville	24 March 1909 - 24 March 1911
2	Vice-Admiral	Vice-Admiral - Royal Navy	Prince Louis of Battenberg	24 March 1911 - 5 December 1911
3	Acting-Vice-Admiral	Vice-Admiral - Royal Navy	Frederick T. Hamilton	5 December 1911 - May, 1912

=== Rear Admirals in the 3rd and 4th Divisions ===
Post holders included:

#	Rank	Flag	Name	Term
Rear Admirals in the Third and Fourth Divisions
1	Rear-Admiral	Rear-Admiral - Royal Navy	T. H. Martyn Jerram	24 March 1909 - 9 August 1910
2	Rear-Admiral	Rear-Admiral - Royal Navy	William Lowther Grant	9 August 1910 - 2 November 1911
3	Rear-Admiral	Rear-Admiral - Royal Navy	Charles H. Dundas of Dundas	2 November 1911 - May 1912

== Devonport Division ==
Post holders included:

#	Rank	Flag	Name	Term
Rear-Admiral Commanding, Devonport Division, Home Fleet
1	Rear-Admiral	Rear-Admiral - Royal Navy	Cecil Burney	5 January, 1910 – 5 January 1911
2	Rear-Admiral	Rear-Admiral - Royal Navy	Richard B. Farquhar	5 January 1911 - 5 January 1912
3	Rear-Admiral	Rear-Admiral - Royal Navy	Henry Loftus Tottenham	5 January 1912 - May 1912

=== Components ===
Included:

#	Unit	Notes
1	Pre-dreadnought battleships	(3-7, pre-dreadnought battleships)
2	5th Destroyer Flotilla	(2, destroyers)
3	7th Destroyer Flotilla	(2, destroyers)
4	Devonport Submarine Flotilla	(5 A-class submarines, in reserve but recommissioned by 1910 and 3 B-class submarines )
5	I Submarine Flotilla	(11 B-class submarines, 1 Depot ship )
6	VI Submarine Flotilla	(a training unit )

== Nore Division ==
The Rear-Admiral Commanding, Nore Division, Home Fleet from 4 January, 1909 - 5 January, 1910 was Rear Admiral Charles J. Briggs.

=== Components ===
Included:

#	Unit	Notes
1	Pre-dreadnought battleships	(8, pre-dreadnought battleships)
2	3rd Destroyer Flotilla	(4, destroyers)
3	Nore Submarine Flotilla	(4 C-class submarines split into III and VII submarine flotillas, 4.1910 )
4	III Submarine Flotilla	(9 C-class submarines, 1 depot ship)
5	VII Submarine Flotilla	(12 C-class submarines, 1 depot ship)

== Portsmouth Division ==
Post holders included:

#	Rank	Flag	Name	Term
Rear-Admiral Commanding, Portsmouth Division, Home Fleet
1	Rear-Admiral	Rear-Admiral - Royal Navy	Frederic E. E. Brock	17 November, 1909 – 10 November, 1910
2	Rear-Admiral	Rear-Admiral - Royal Navy	Arthur H. Limpus	10 November, 1910 - 17 November, 1911
3	Rear-Admiral	Rear-Admiral - Royal Navy	Arthur Y. Moggridge	17 November, 1911 - May 1912

=== Components ===
Included:

#	Unit	Notes
1	Pre-dreadnought battleship	(4, pre-dreadnought battleships)
2	4th Destroyer Flotilla	(4, destroyers)
3	Portsmouth Submarine Flotilla	(9 C-class submarines, 1 depot ship - till April 1910 then flotilla is split up)
4	II Submarine Flotilla	(9 C-class submarines, 4 D-class submarines, 1 depot ship - from 4.1910 )
5	IV Submarine Flotilla	(4 A-class destroyers, 5 C-class submarines, 1 depot ship - from 4.1910)
6	V Submarine Flotilla	(formed as training unit from 4.1910)

== Sources ==
- Friedman, Norman (2014). Fighting the Great War at Sea: Strategy, Tactic and Technology. Seaforth Publishing. ISBN 9781473849709.
- Mackie, Gordon. "Royal Navy Senior Appointments from 1865" (PDF). gulabin.com. Gordon Mackie, p. 199. December 2017.
- Watson, Dr Graham. (2015) "Royal Navy Organisation and Ship Deployments 1900-1914". www.naval-history.net. Gordon Smith.
