= 1914 fleet review =

British naval event in the Solent

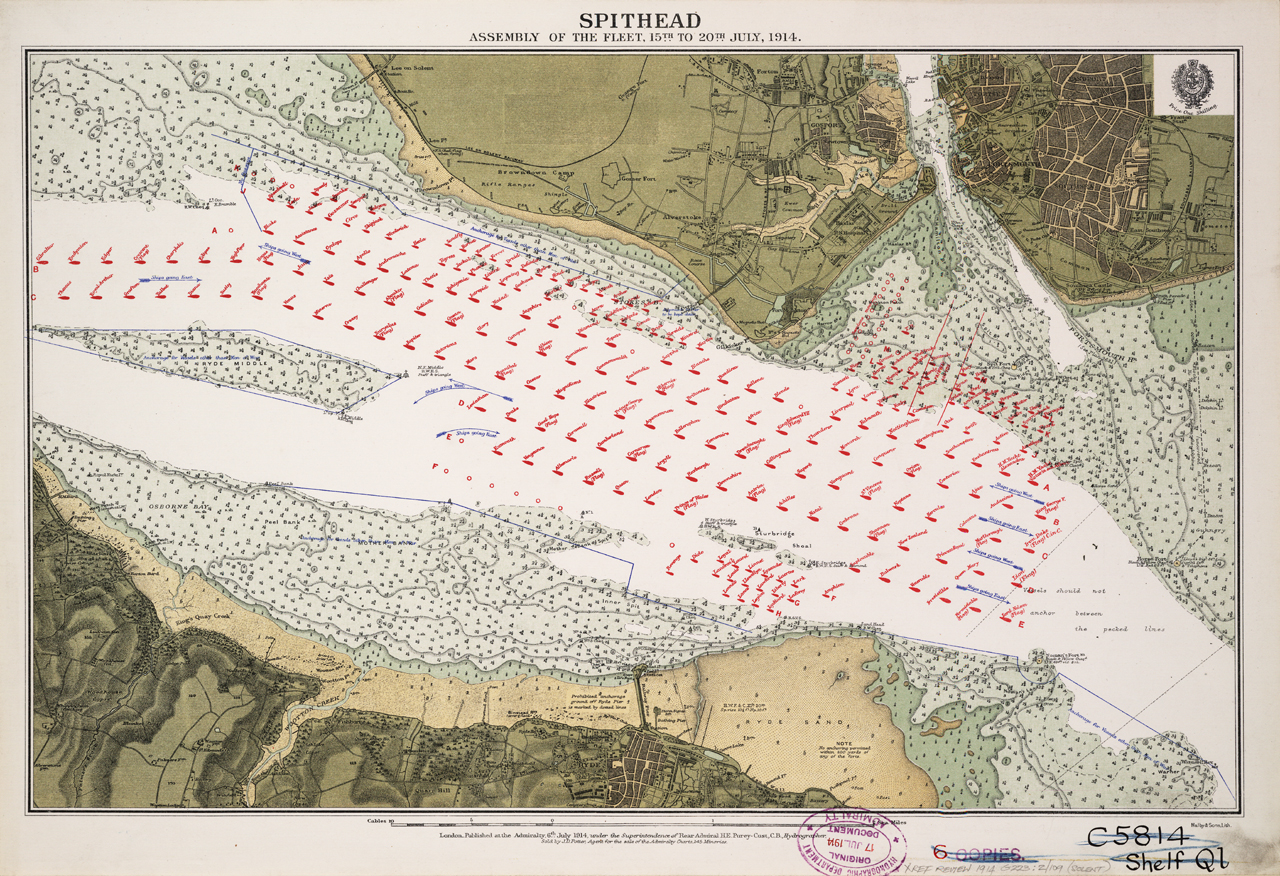
Chart showing positions of vessels during the review

The 1914 fleet review was a gathering of British Royal Navy vessels that took place in the lead-up to the First World War. The decision to hold a fleet review in lieu of the normal "grand manoeuvres" training exercise had been made by the First Lord of the Admiralty, Winston Churchill, in Autumn 1913 as a cost-saving measure. The review included the assembly of the active-duty First Fleet and mobilisations of the reserve vessels of the Second and Third Fleets.

More than 200 vessels, including 59 battleships, took part, assembling at Spithead in the Solent from 15 July. They were joined by 17 seaplanes and four airships and flypasts were made by land-based Royal Navy aeroplanes. The review commenced on 20 July with the vessels steaming out of harbour past the king, George V, aboard the royal yacht HMY Victoria and Albert, there followed four days of training exercises. The Third Fleet was dispersed on 23 July but the First and Second Fleets remained mobilised and the Third Fleet was recalled on 27 July as a result of increasing tensions between the European great powers. This allowed time for the vessels to prepare for combat and reach their wartime base of Scapa Flow before the commencement of hostilities on 4 August.

== Background ==
A contemporary postcard showing the ships assembled on 18 July, ahead of the review. A handwritten note states "9 miles of ships"

From 1912 the Royal Navy maintained three fleets in home waters. The First Fleet was the main regular force of dreadnought battleships and battlecruisers, kept active and fully crewed by regular sailors in peacetime; the Second Fleet, generally of older vessels, was staffed by reduced crews sufficient to carry out routine maintenance, put to sea for short periods and man part of their armament; the Third Fleet was a reserve manned by skeleton crews to carry out essential maintenance only and not capable of putting to sea without additional manpower.

The fleets generally held annual "grand manoeuvres" at sea as part of a training programme. In Autumn 1913 the First Lord of the Admiralty, Winston Churchill, ordered that the 1914 manoeuvres were to be abandoned as a cost-saving measure. Instead he ordered that a trial mobilisation be held to fully man the Second and Third Fleets. The mobilisation would test the process for bringing the reserve fleets up to war readiness and include some short exercises of manoeuvre.

Germany, a great power rival of Britain, increased her strategic naval options in 1914 with the completion of the widening of the Kiel Canal to accept dreadnought battleships, allowing their direct movement between the Baltic Sea and North Sea without passing through the Danish Straits. The opening of the widened canal in late June was attended by a Royal Navy squadron. The test mobilisation of the Second and Third Fleets began on 15 July, at a time of escalating tensions in Europe following the 28 June assassination of Archduke Franz Ferdinand, but had been long-planned and the timing was coincidental.

== Review ==
British Film Institute videos of the review
- Naval Review 1914
- The King with his Fleet

As part of the test mobilisation ships of the three fleets assembled at Spithead for a Fleet Review from 20 to 23 July. Also assembled were five flights (A through E) of seaplanes from the Royal Naval Air Service (RNAS), which had only separated from the Royal Flying Corps on 1 July. The aircraft, around 17 in total, comprised every serviceable seaplane in the RNAS at that time and included at least three Short Admiralty Type 74s and a Sopwith Bat Boat.

The seaplanes were moored during the review at Hamilton Bank. The seaplanes were joined by 12 RNAS land-based aeroplanes operating out of Portsmouth, Calshot and Weymouth. The review was also attended by four airships (HMA No.3, No.4, No.18 and No.19). On 18 July a flypast of 20 aeroplanes and seaplanes led by Charles Rumney Samson was made over the assembling fleet and around the airships. During the review one of the airships took the first ever aerial photograph from directly above a battleship.

By 20 July some 216 British warships had been assembled and anchored in The Solent between the Isle of Wight and the English mainland. This included 24 dreadnought battleships, 35 pre-dreadnoughts, 18 armoured cruisers, 31 protected and light cruisers and 78 destroyers. The other 30 vessels included torpedo boats, depot ships, submarines and auxiliary vessels. The assembled ships represented around half of the total number of vessels in the Royal Navy and was the most powerful gathering of warships in British waters to that date. The vessels were anchored in 12 lines, totalling 40 miles (64 km) in length.

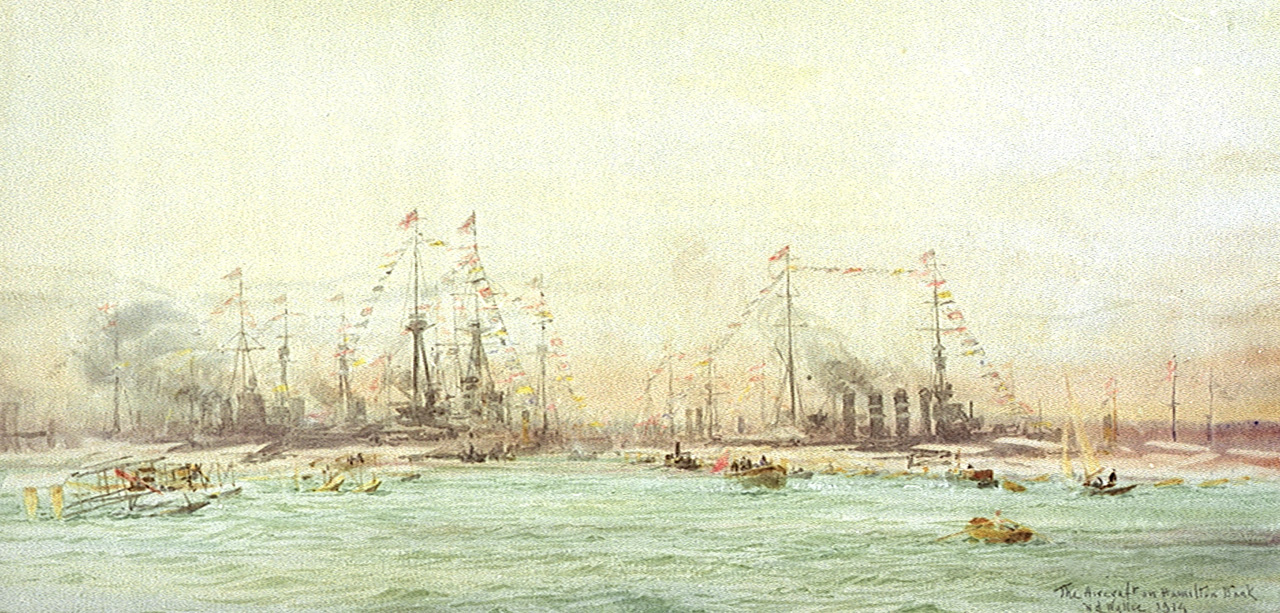
Sea planes at the review moored off Hamilton Bank with the fleet behind dressed overall

George V arrived at Portsmouth on 20 July aboard the royal yacht HMY Victoria and Albert. The vessel's captain, John Ernest Harper, served as master of the fleet for the review. The review was also attended by Churchill. Victoria and Albert left Portsmouth later on 20 July, escorted by the airships No.3 and No.4 to anchor off what is now the location of Nab Tower. The entire fleet then passed in a single line in front of the yacht for review by the king. Overhead the 17 seaplanes and two formations of aeroplanes carried out one of the earliest recorded instances of close formation flying by British aircraft, for which they had carried out several weeks of practice at Eastchurch airfield.

Following the review, the vessels involved carried out four days of exercises in manoeuvring and battle practice. These were observed by some of the attendees of the Cowes Regatta, including Prince Henry of Prussia, brother of the German emperor, who went on to visit George V at Buckingham Palace to seek assurances about peace between the two nations.

== Aftermath ==
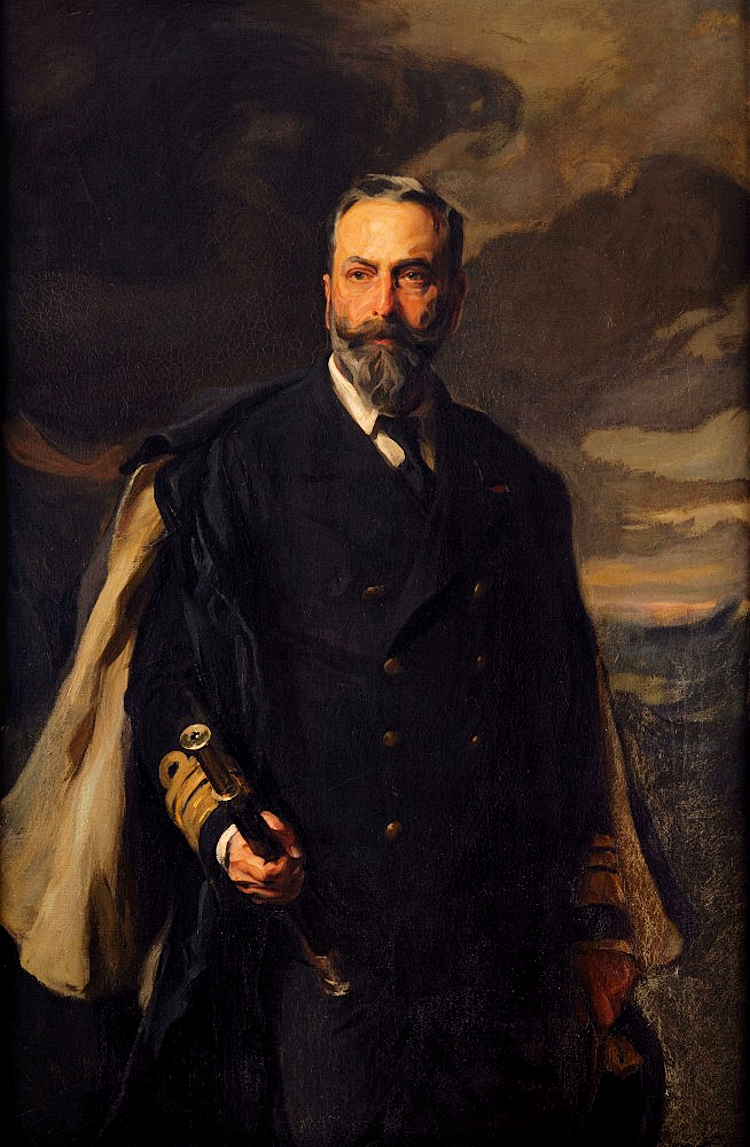
Battenberg

After the review the First Fleet was scheduled to take part in flag-showing visits and the Second and Third Fleets to return to port and discharge their reservists. The Third Fleet was dispersed to its home ports to pay off on 23 July; the First and Second Fleets moved to Portland Harbour and made some initial preparations for active service, with ammunition loaded and personal effects taken off. On 26 July the First Sea Lord, Prince Louis of Battenberg, ordered the First Fleet to remain assembled and the following day ordered the reactivation of the reserve fleets and the commencement of precautionary patrols around British harbours. This action, for which he had no legal basis for ordering, came to be regarded as important in ensuring that the navy was in a state of readiness for the outbreak of war; by 1918 the common public perception was that Churchill had made the order, having foreseen the coming war.

The RNAS aeroplanes, under Samson, had begun a tour of southern England after the review, beginning with displays at Dorchester and the Central Flying School at Upavon. The aircraft were at Upavon on 27 July when they received an order to prepare for war and concentrate at Eastchurch. By this time the RNAS seaplanes had already commenced war-style patrols of the coast.

On 27 July Austria invaded Serbia and two days later the First Fleet was ordered to its wartime base of Scapa Flow, Portland being considered at risk from surprise attack. Here, with parts of Second Fleet, it was formed into the Grand Fleet. Russia announced a mobilisation of her military on 30 July and the following day Germany mobilised and its High Seas Fleet moved from Norway to the North Sea; by this time the vessels at Scapa Flow had completed most of their preparations for war.

Germany declared war on Russia on 1 August and the same day Britain mobilised the Royal Navy for war. On 3 August Germany declared war on France and invaded Belgium. A British ultimatum for Germany to respect the neutrality of Belgium expired without reply at 23.00 on 3 August and Britain declared war shortly afterwards. The Admiralty ordered its ships to commence hostilities against Germany at midnight and the following morning the destroyer HMS Lance fired the first British shot of the war to sink the German ferry Königin Luise, which was laying mines, after it failed to stop when ordered.
