= Channel Fleet =

Former naval fleet of the Royal Navy

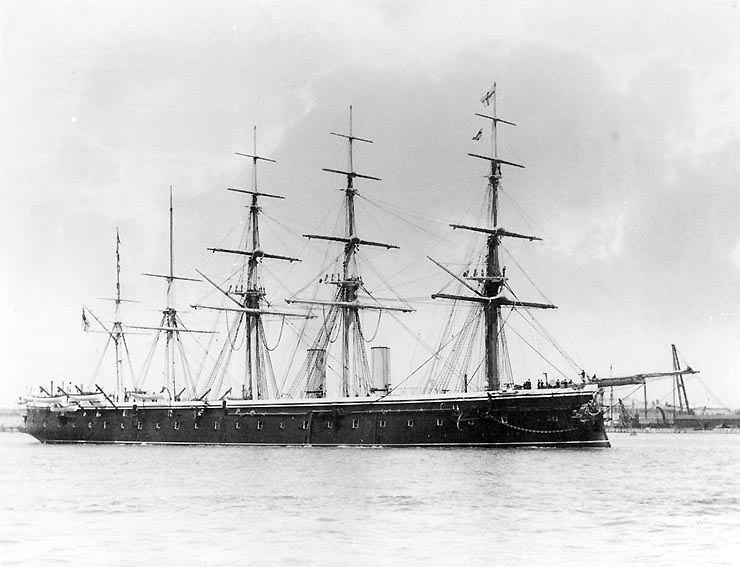
- British ironclad HMS Minotaur as Channel Fleet flagship, c. 1875–1887
- Active: 1854–1909, 1914–1915
- Country: United Kingdom
- Branch: Royal Navy
- Type: Fleet
- Garrison/HQ: Torbay, Falmouth and Plymouth.

The Channel Fleet and originally known as the Channel Squadron was the Royal Navy formation of warships that defended the waters of the English Channel from 1854 to 1909 and 1914 to 1915.

== History ==
Throughout the Royal Navy's history there had been different squadrons stationed in home waters. One of the earliest known naval formations to be based at Plymouth was called the Western Squadron which was the forerunner of the Channel Squadron that was later known as the Channel Fleet. In 1650 Captain William Penn, Commander-in-Chief, was charged with guarding the Channel from Beachy Head to Lands End with six ships. This system continued following the Restoration. It was the start of what was to become a Western Squadron. From 1690 the squadron operated out of Plymouth Dockyard during wartime periods, which was for most of the 18th century and early 19th century. In 1854 The Channel Squadron, sometimes known as the Particular Service Squadron, was established. The Channel Squadron only became a permanent formation in 1858.

During the 19th century, as the French developed Cherbourg as a base for steam-powered ships, the Royal Navy developed Portland Harbour as a base for the fleet. The harbour was built between 1849 and 1872 when the Royal Navy created a breakwater made of blocks from local quarries on the Isle of Portland.

With the amelioration of Anglo-French relations, and the German challenge towards 1900, the need for a Channel Formation diminished and the main European naval arena shifted to the North Sea. Admiral Sir Arthur Wilson was officially "Senior Officer in Command of the Channel Squadron" from 1901 to 1903. His subordinate flag officer in that squadron was the Second-in-Command, who commanded a division of battleships. For the period 1858 to 1903 the Channel squadron was often incorrectly referred to as the Channel Fleet.

On 17 April 1903 Lord Charles Beresford was appointed Vice-Admiral Commanding, Channel Squadron. On 6 May 1903 Admiral Beresford was informed by the Admiralty "that for the future the Channel Squadron shall be known as the Channel Fleet." On 14 December 1904 the Channel Fleet was re-styled the 'Atlantic Fleet' and the Home Fleet became the 'Channel Fleet'.

On 24 March 1909, under a fleet re-organisation, the Channel Fleet became the 2nd Division of the Home Fleet.

== Rear and Vice-Admiral, Particular Service Squadron ==
- Vice-Admiral Sir Charles Napier, (1854–1856)
- Rear-Admiral, Henry Chads, (1854–1856)
- Rear-Admiral Sir Richard Saunders Dundas, (1856–1857)
- Rear-Admiral Sir Michael Seymour. (1856–1857)

== Senior Officers in Command of the Channel Squadron ==
Post holders have included:

- Vice Admiral Sir Charles Fremantle (1859–1860)
- Vice Admiral Sir Robert Stopford (1860–1861)
- Vice Admiral Sir Robert Smart (1861–1863)
- Vice Admiral Sir Sydney Dacres (1863–1866)
- Vice Admiral Sir Hastings Yelverton (1866–1867)
- Vice Admiral Frederick Warden (1867–1868)
- Vice Admiral Sir Thomas Symonds (1868–1870)
- Vice Admiral Sir Hastings Yelverton (July 1870-October 1870)
- Vice Admiral Sir George Wellesley (1870–1871)
- Vice Admiral Sir Geoffrey Hornby (1871–1874)
- Vice Admiral Sir Beauchamp Seymour (1874–1877)
- Vice Admiral Lord John Hay (1877–1879)
- Vice Admiral Arthur Hood, 1st Baron Hood of Avalon (1880–1882)
- Vice Admiral Sir William Dowell (1882–1883)
- Vice Admiral Prince Alfred, Duke of Edinburgh (1883–1884)
- Vice Admiral Sir Algernon de Horsey (1884–1885)
- Vice Admiral Charles Fellowes (1885–1886)
- Vice Admiral Sir William Hewett (1886–1888)
- Vice Admiral Sir John Baird (1888–1890)
- Vice Admiral Sir Michael Culme-Seymour, 3rd Baronet (1890–1892)
- Vice Admiral Sir Henry Fairfax (1892–1894)
- Vice Admiral Sir Robert Fitzroy (1894–1895)
- Vice Admiral Lord Walter Kerr (1895–1897)
- Vice Admiral Sir Henry Stephenson (1897–1898)
- Vice Admiral Sir Harry Rawson (1898–1901)
- Vice Admiral Sir Arthur Wilson (1901–1903)
- Vice-Admiral Lord Charles Beresford (1903-4)

=== Second-in-Command Channel Squadron ===
Post holders included:

- Rear-Admiral Henry Chads, 1 October 1869.
- Rear-Admiral William Dowell, 1877
- Rear-Admiral Henry Boys, 1878
- Rear-Admiral Henry C. Glyn, 20 June 1881.
- Rear-Admiral Sir Francis W. Sullivan, 14 August 1882
- Rear-Admiral John C. Wilson, 1 April 1883
- Rear-Admiral William Whyte, 13 May 1884
- Rear-Admiral Algernon Heneage, 3 July 1885 – 7 August 1886
- Rear-Admiral Edmund Fremantle, 9 August 1886
- Rear-Admiral Charles Rowley, 18 August 1887
- Rear-Admiral St. George Caulfield d′Arcy-Irvine, 1 September 1888
- Rear-Admiral Richard Tracey, 12 September 1889
- Rear-Admiral Loftus F. Jones, 12 September 1890
- Rear-Admiral Edward Adeane, 15 September 1891
- Rear-Admiral Edward Seymour, 16 September 1892 – 25 April 1894
- Rear-Admiral Alfred Dale, 25 April 1894 – 20 April 1895
- Rear-Admiral Arthur Alington, 1 May 1895
- Rear-Admiral Armand Powlett, 1 May 1896 – 19 May 1897
- Rear-Admiral John Fellowes, 19 May 1897
- Rear-Admiral John Brackenbury, 1 June 1898
- Rear-Admiral Arthur Fanshawe, 1 June 1899 – 31 May 1900
- Rear-Admiral Albert B. Jenkings, 1 June 1900 - 5 June 1901
- Rear-Admiral Sir William Acland, 2nd Baronet, 5 June 1901 – September 1901

== Commanders-in-Chief Channel Fleet ==
- Admiral Sir Arthur Wilson 14 December 1904
- Admiral Lord Charles Beresford (1907–1909)

Note Channel Fleet was absorbed by Home Fleet in 1909

- Vice Admiral Sir Lewis Bayly (August, 1914- 17 January 1915)
- Vice Admiral Sir. Alexander Bethell (17 January 1915)

=== Second-in-Command Channel Fleet ===
Post holders included:

- Rear-Admiral Assheton Curzon-Howe: September 1901, - 5 June 1903
- Rear-Admiral Hedworth Lambton: 5 June 1903 - 25 June 1904
- Rear-Admiral Francis Bridgeman: 25 June 1904 - May, 1905
- Rear-Admiral Charles Barlow: May, 1905 - December, 1905
- Vice-Admiral Sir Arthur Moore: December, 1905 - 5 December 1906
- Vice-Admiral Assheton Curzon-Howe: 5 December 1906 - 23 February 1907
- Vice-Admiral Sir Reginald Custance: 23 February 1907 - 12 June 1908
- Vice-Admiral Sir Archibald Berkeley Milne: 12 June 1908

=== Rear-Admirals in the Channel Fleet ===
Post holders included:

- Rear-Admiral Sir Richard Poore, : February, 1905 - 16 November 1905
- Rear-Admiral Robert Groome: 16 November 1905 - 16 November 1906
- Rear-Admiral George Callaghan: 16 November 1906 - 5, April 1907
- Rear-Admiral Robert Lowry: 5, April, 1907 - 1 October 1907
- Rear-Admiral Francis Foley: 1 October 1907 - 1 October 1908
- Rear-Admiral James Startin: 1 October 1908 - 9 October 1909

== Components ==
=== 1895 ===
Distribution of the Fleet first included:

	Unit	Date	Notes
1	Battleships	4 September 1895	5 ships: Royal Sovereign, Empress of India, Resolution, and Repulse.
2	Cruisers	4 September 1895	5 ships: Blenheim, Endymion, Bellona, Halcyon, and Speedy.

=== 1901 to 1904 ===
Distribution of the Fleet first included:

Of note:As the Channel Squadron - renamed The Channel Fleet, September, 1901.

	Unit	Date	Notes
1	Battleships	September 1901 - 1904	5 ships
2	Cruiser Squadron	September 1901 - 1904	10 ships

=== 1905 to 1907 ===
Distribution of the Fleet first included:

	Unit	Date	Notes
1	Battleships	January 1905-February 1907	12 ships - increased to 18 by 1907
2	1st Cruiser Squadron	January 1905-February 1907	5 ships to 1905 + 2 more ships from 1906
3	Channel Fleet Flotilla	January 1905-February 1907	consisting of destroyers and divided into 1st, 2nd, 3rd, 4th Divisions

=== 1907 to 1909 ===
Distribution of the Fleet first included:

	Unit	Date	Notes
1	Battleships	March 1907-March 1909	14 ships
2	1st Cruiser Squadron	March 1907-March 1909	6 ships
3	Channel Fleet Flotilla	March 1907-March 1909	divided into 1st Destroyer Flotilla & 3rd Destroyer Flotilla in March.1909

=== 1914 to 1915 ===
Of note: On 8 August 1914, ships from the pre-war Second and Third Fleets were organised into the Channel Fleet.

Distribution of the Fleet first included:

	Unit	Date	Notes
1	5th Battle Squadron	August 1914-March 1915	Transferred from 2nd Fleet
2	8th Battle Squadron	August 1914-March 1915	7th and 8th BattSq's (3rd Fleet) merged to form 8th BattSq - dispersed 20/08/14
3	5th Cruiser Squadron	August 1914-March 1915	
4	6th Cruiser Squadron	August 1914-March 1915	
5	7th Cruiser Squadron	August 1914-March 1915	
6	8th Cruiser Squadron	August 1914-March 1915	
7	9th Cruiser Squadron	August 1914-March 1915	
8	10th Cruiser Squadron	August 1914-March 1915	
9	11th Cruiser Squadron	August 1914-March 1915	
10	12th Cruiser Squadron	August 1914-March 1915	

== In literature ==
The Channel Fleet features in several historical novels about the Royal Navy, notably Hornblower and the Hotspur by C. S. Forester, in which Forester's fictional hero becomes a favourite of the real Channel Fleet commander, Admiral William Cornwallis. The fleet also features in several of the Aubrey–Maturin novels by Patrick O'Brian.

The novel Billy Budd by Herman Melville is set on board ships of the Channel Fleet, in the immediate aftermath of the Spithead and Nore mutinies of 1797.

In the novel The War of the Worlds, the Channel Fleet protects the huge mass of refugee ships escaping from the Essex coast in the face of the Martian onslaught. The initial heroic fight of HMS Thunder Child and the subsequent general engagement, is detailed in the chapter entitled "The Thunderchild".
