= Robert Lowry (Royal Navy officer) =

Royal Navy Admiral (1854–1920)

Admiral Sir Robert Lowry KCB
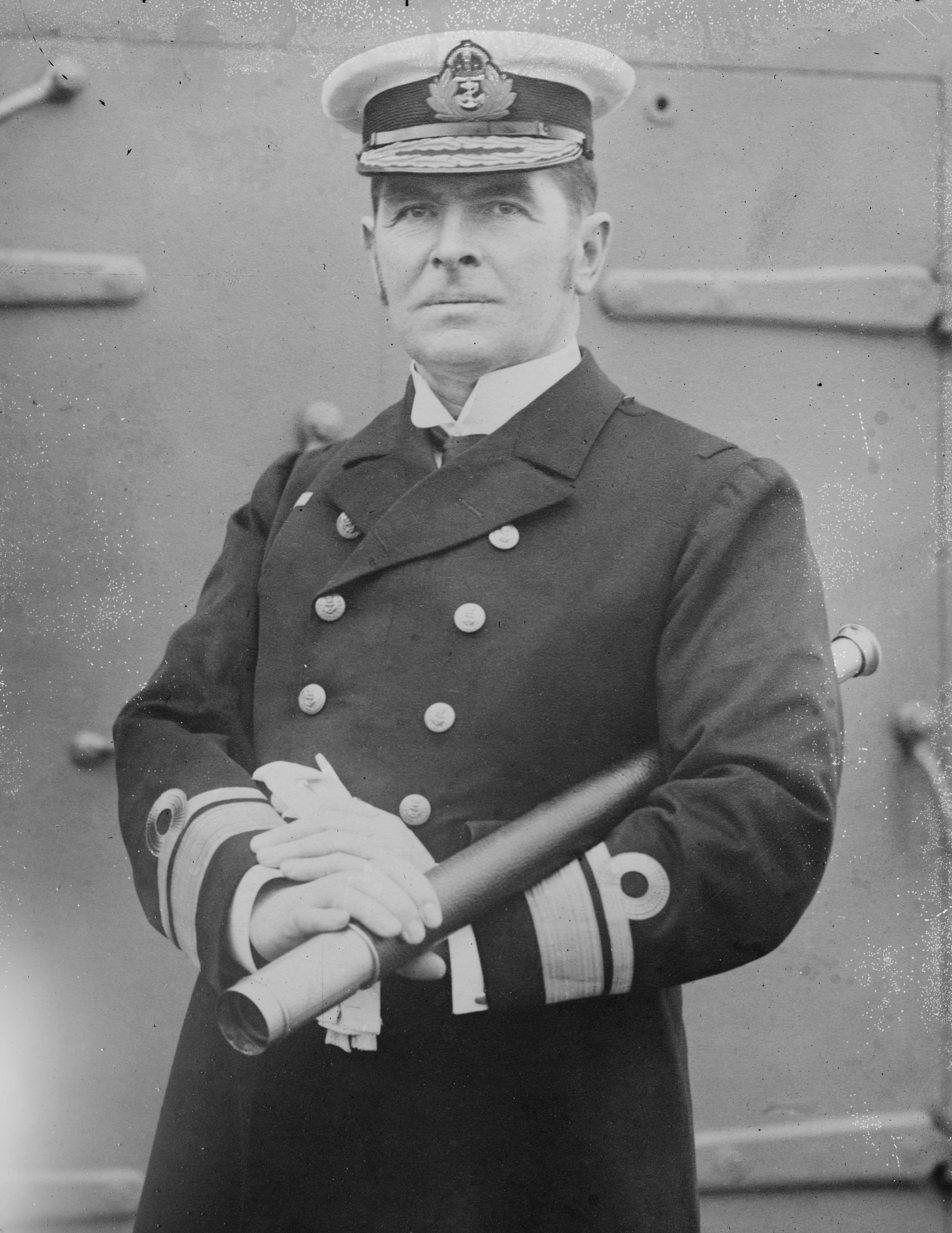
- Lowry in 1916
- Born: 4 March 1854
- Died: 29 May 1920 (aged 66)
- Burial place: St Nicholas Churchyard, Wickham, Hampshire
- Military career
- Allegiance: United Kingdom
- Branch: Royal Navy
- Service years: c.1872–1917
- Rank: Admiral
- Commands: HMS Ramillies; HMS Hood; HMS Russell; Coast of Scotland
- Conflicts: World War I
- Awards: Knight Commander of the Order of the Bath

Admiral Sir Robert Swinburne Lowry, KCB (4 March 1854 – 29 May 1920) was a Royal Navy officer who became Admiral Commanding on the Coast of Scotland.

== Early life ==
Lowry was the eldest son of Emily Rohesia (née Ward) and Lieutenant General Robert William Lowry. He was educated at the Royal Naval College, Dartmouth,

== Naval career ==
While a Midshipman, he was one of three crew of HMS Invincible to be awarded a Royal Humane Society Bronze award for saving a life off the coast of Gibraltar.

Lowry was made a lieutenant in the Royal Navy on 15 October 1875.

Lowry while still a lieutenant as the first to suggest the use of large-scale underway replenishment techniques in an 1883 paper to the think tank Royal United Services Institute. He argued that a successful system would provide a minimum rate of 20 tons per hour while the ships maintain a speed of five knots. His proposal was for transfer to be effected through watertight coal carriers suspended from a cable between the two ships.

Lowry was promoted to the rank of commander on 31 December 1889.

On 7 January 1890 Lowry was appointed to command of the armoured cruiser HMS Undaunted. In April 1891, while serving with the Mediterranean Fleet HMS Undaunted and HMS Melita went to the aid of the French cruiser Seignelay when she ran aground off Jaffa. In recognition of his assistance, the French government presented Lowry with two small Sèvres vases.

He was promoted to the rank captain on 30 June 1896. In January 1900 he was given command of the pre-dreadnought battleship HMS Ramillies, flagship of the second-in-command of the Mediterranean Fleet. After handing over command of the Ramillies on 27 February 1902 he was in May 1902 appointed in command of the battleship HMS Hood, also serving in the Mediterranean. During combined manoeuvres with the Channel squadron in the Aegean sea, the Hood damaged her rudder on the seabed, and in November 1902 she had to return to Chatham for repairs and a refit. Lowry paid her off on 5 December 1902, and was appointed Commanding officer of the Royal Naval Engineering College at Keyham on the following day, serving as such until 6 December 1905.

He became naval aide-de-camp to the King in 1905 and commanded the battleship HMS Russell in 1905 before becoming Rear Admiral Channel Fleet in April 1907 and President of the Royal Naval War College at Portsmouth in November 1907. He was made Commander of the 5th Cruiser Squadron in November 1908, Commander of the 2nd Cruiser Squadron in February 1909 and then Admiral Commanding on the Coast of Scotland in July 1913, serving in that role into World War I and until 1916.

He retired from active service on 19 August 1917. to his home at Wickham Lodge at Wickham in Hampshire.

== Death ==
He died in 1920 and was buried on 2 June 1920 in St Nicholas Churchyard, Wickham.

== Personal life ==
He married Helena MacGregor Greer (23 September 1865 - 28 December 1948). They had two children, Robert Graham (18 August 1899 - 4 September 1975) and Violet Hope (21 November 1904 - 17 July 1975).

== Honours ==
He was appointed a Knight Commander of the Order of the Bath on 3 June 1913.

Military offices
Preceded by New Post	Admiral Commanding on the Coast of Scotland; 1913–1916	Succeeded by Sir Frederick Hamilton
