= Gordon Moore (Royal Navy officer) =

Royal Navy Admiral (1862–1934)

Admiral Sir Gordon Moore KCB CVO
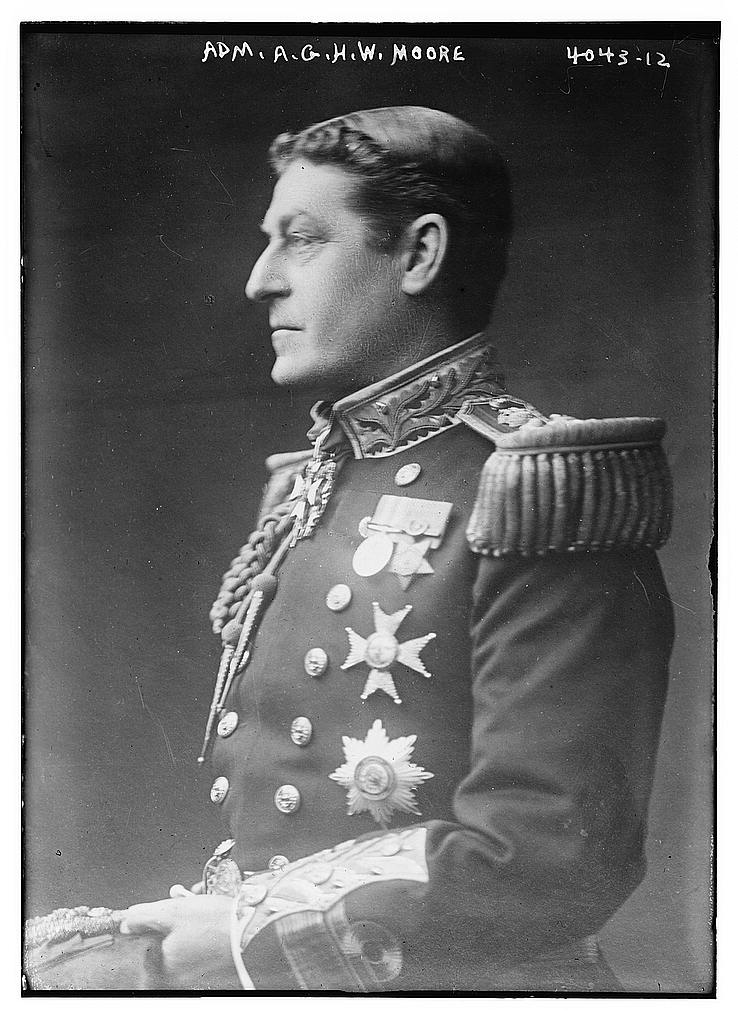
- Moore in 1916
- Born: 2 February 1862
- Died: 2 April 1934 (aged 72)
- Military career
- Allegiance: United Kingdom
- Branch: Royal Navy
- Service years: 1875–1919
- Rank: Admiral
- Commands: 9th Cruiser Squadron (1915–16); 2nd Battlecruiser Squadron (1915); 1st Cruiser Squadron (1914–15); 7th Cruiser Squadron (1913); HMS Dreadnought (1908–09); HMS Euryalus (1906–07); HMS Royal Arthur (1905–06); HMS Ariadne (1904–05)
- Conflicts: Anglo-Egyptian War; First World War
- Awards: Knight Commander of the Order of the Bath; Commander of the Royal Victorian Order

Admiral Sir Archibald Gordon Henry Wilson Moore, KCB, CVO (2 February 1862 – 2 April 1934) was a Royal Navy officer who served as Third Sea Lord from 1912 to 1914.

== Naval career ==
Moore joined the Royal Navy in 1875 and served in the Anglo-Egyptian War of 1882. He was promoted to captain on 30 June 1901. In early 1903 he took part in the special mission (headed by Lord Downe) deputized by the King to travel to Iran to present the Shah with the insignia of the Order of the Garter. He was appointed Naval Assistant to the First Sea Lord in 1907 and Director of Naval Ordnance and Torpedoes in 1909. Promoted Rear-Admiral in 1911, he went on to be Third Sea Lord in 1912. He served in the First World War, commanding the 2nd Battlecruiser Squadron from 1914.

As Vice Admiral Sir David Beatty's second-in-command at the Battle of Dogger Bank, Moore led the sinking of SMS Blücher in January 1915. Heavily criticized for allowing the seriously damaged SMS Seydlitz and SMS Derfflinger to escape together with the undamaged SMS Moltke, he was "quietly removed from the Grand Fleet and assigned to command (the 9th Cruiser Squadron) in the Canary Islands where the possibility of any appearance by German surface ships was remote". Military historian Chuck Steele wrote in 2022 that Moore's transfer actually resulted from his complaints to Winston Churchill, then First Lord of the Admiralty, about Beatty's signaling failures; even Beatty privately expressed his belief that Moore was being scapegoated.

In 1917, Moore went on to be Controller of the Mechanical Warfare Department. He retired in 1919. He was appointed a deputy lieutenant of Hampshire in 1921.

Military offices
Preceded by Sir Charles Briggs	Third Sea Lord; 1912–1914	Succeeded by Sir Frederick Tudor
