= Cecil Burney =

Royal Navy Admiral of the Fleet (1858–1929)

Admiral of the Fleet Sir Cecil Burney Bt GCB GCMG DL
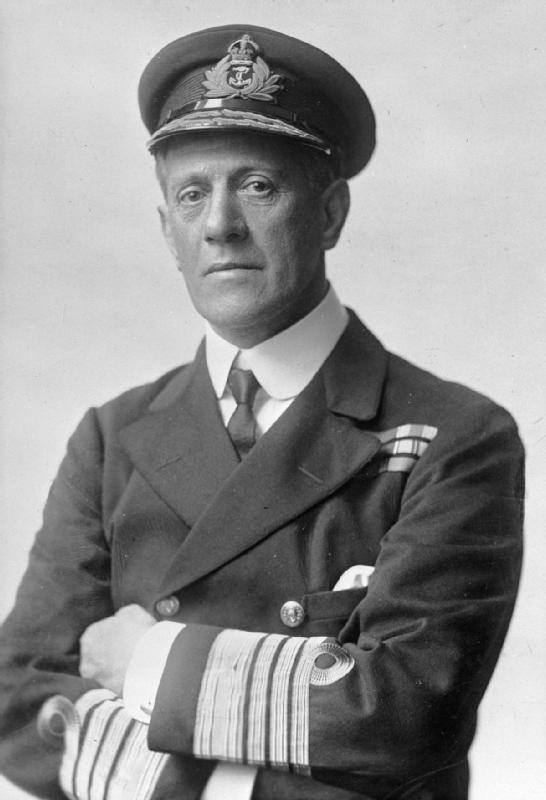

Commander-in-Chief, Portsmouth
- In office March 1919 – 1920

Commander-in-Chief, Coast of Scotland
- In office October 1917 – March 1919

Second Sea Lord
- In office November 1916 – September 1917

Vice-Admiral/Admiral Commanding 1st Battle Squadron
- In office December 1914 – November 1916

Vice-Admiral Commanding Channel Fleet
- In office August 1914 – December 1914

Vice-Admiral Commanding Second and Third Fleets
- In office December 1913 – August 1914

Vice-Admiral Commanding 3rd Battle Squadron
- In office April 1912 – December 1913

Vice-Admiral Commanding Atlantic Fleet
- In office September 1911 – April 1912

Rear-Admiral Commanding 5th Cruiser Squadron
- In office February 1911 – September 1911

Personal details
- Born: 15 May 1858 Saint Saviour, Jersey
- Died: 5 June 1929 (aged 71) Upham, Hampshire, England
- Resting place: Brookwood Cemetery
- Awards: Knight Grand Cross of the Order of the Bath; Knight Grand Cross of the Order of St Michael and St George

Military service
- Allegiance: United Kingdom
- Branch/service: Royal Navy
- Years of service: 1871–1925
- Rank: Admiral of the Fleet
- Commands: HMS Boscawen; HMS Minotaur; HMS Hawke; HMS Sappho; HMS Resolution; HMS Empress of India; HMS Triumph; HMS Impregnable; Plymouth Division of the Home Fleet; 5th Cruiser Squadron; Atlantic Fleet; 3rd Battle Squadron; Second Fleet and Third Fleet; Channel Fleet; 1st Battle Squadron; Coast of Scotland; Portsmouth Command
- Battles/wars: Anglo-Egyptian War; Mahdist War; Second Boer War; First Balkan War; First World War

Admiral of the Fleet Sir Cecil Burney, 1st Baronet, GCB, GCMG, DL (15 May 1858 – 5 June 1929) was a Royal Navy officer. After seeing action as a junior office in naval brigades during both the Anglo-Egyptian War and the Mahdist War, he commanded a cruiser in operational service during the Second Boer War. As a flag officer he commanded the Plymouth Division of the Home Fleet, the 5th Cruiser Squadron, the Atlantic Fleet and then the 3rd Battle Squadron.

In April 1913 Montenegro seized control of Scutari in the latest round of hostilities between the Ottoman Empire and Montenegro during the closing stages of the First Balkan War. In April 1913 Burney was sent as temporary Second-in-Command of the Mediterranean Fleet to Antivari on the coast of Montenegro to take command of the international naval force despatched to deal with this situation. On arrival he blockaded Antivari and then also commanded the international force occupying Scutari as part of its transition to Albanian control. He was well rewarded with honours for the success of this mission.

On the outbreak of the First World War Burney became Vice-Admiral Commanding the Channel Fleet. In that role he ensured the safe passage of the British Expeditionary Force to France. He went on to be commander of the 1st Battle Squadron commanding the squadron at the Battle of Jutland in May 1916, where his flagship HMS Marlborough was the first ship to engage the Germans but was later torpedoed. He was appointed Second Sea Lord in November 1916 but removed on the grounds of his age in September 1917 and appointed Commander-in-Chief, Coast of Scotland instead. He went on to be Commander-in-Chief, Portsmouth after the War.

== Early years ==
The son of Captain Charles Burney RN and Catherine Elizabeth Burney (née Jones), Burney was born in Saint Saviour, Jersey. He was educated at Burney's Royal Naval Academy, Gosport and then joined the Royal Navy as a cadet in the training ship HMS Britannia in July 1871. Promoted midshipman in October 1873, he was assigned to the battleship HMS Repulse, flagship of the Pacific Station and, after promotion to sub-lieutenant on 18 October 1877, he transferred to the troopship HMS Serapis in January 1879. He joined the Royal Yacht HMY Victoria and Albert in June 1879 and was promoted lieutenant on 30 August 1879.

Burney joined the corvette HMS Carysfort in the Mediterranean Fleet in September 1880 and served ashore in command of a Gatling gun team as part of a naval brigade and saw action at the Battle of Tell al-Mahuta in August 1882 and the Battle of Kassasin also in August 1882 during the Anglo-Egyptian War. He then also accompanied Sir Charles Warren's expedition in pursuit of the murderers of Professor Edward Palmer and his associates. He went on to serve in operations against Osman Digna who was threatening Suakin in Spring 1884 during the Mahdist War.

Burney returned to Portsmouth to attend the gunnery school HMS Excellent in September 1884 and then joined the staff at the gunnery training ship HMS Cambridge at Devonport in June 1886. He became gunnery officer first in the battleship HMS Bellerophon on the North America and West Indies Station in August 1887, then in the cruiser HMS Comus on the same station in April 1889 and finally in the armoured cruiser HMS Immortalité in the Channel Squadron in January 1892. Promoted commander on 1 January 1893, he became executive officer in the cruiser HMS Hawke in the Mediterranean Fleet in May 1893. In January 1896 he went on to be commanding officer of the boys' training establishment at Portland first in the training ship HMS Boscawen and then in the training ship HMS Minotaur and was promoted captain on 1 January 1898.

In September 1899 Burney took command of his old ship HMS Hawke and in 1900 became the captain of cruiser HMS Sappho, initially on the North American Station, but soon transferred to the Cape of Good Hope Station for operational service in the Second Boer War. HMS Sappho struck the Durban bar on 3 May 1901, although she was under the command of a pilot at the time and Burney was not to blame, and returned to the United Kingdom for repairs. On 27 May 1902 he was appointed in command of the pre-dreadnought battleship HMS Resolution, as Flag Captain to Rear-Admiral George Atkinson-Willes, Second-in-Command of the Home Fleet, during the Coronation Review for King Edward VII. The following month, he was on 16 September appointed in command of HMS Empress of India in the same capacity, and he remained with Atkinson-Willes' successor Rear-Admiral Edmund Poë until June 1904. He became commanding officer of the battleship HMS Triumph in the Home Fleet in June 1904 and commanding officer of the training establishment HMS Impregnable as inspecting captain of boys' training ships in July 1905. He became a naval aide-de-camp to the King on 17 October 1906.

Promoted rear-admiral on 10 October 1907, Burney was given command of the Plymouth Division of the Home Fleet. He became commander of the 5th Cruiser Squadron in the Atlantic Fleet, with his flag in the armoured cruiser HMS Good Hope, in February 1911 and Vice-Admiral Commanding, Atlantic Fleet with his flag in the battleship HMS Prince of Wales and with the rank of acting vice-admiral, in September 1911. He transferred to the command of the 3rd Battle Squadron in the Mediterranean Fleet, with his flag in the battleship HMS King Edward VII, in April 1912 and was promoted to the substantive rank of vice-admiral on 20 September 1912.

== First Balkan War ==
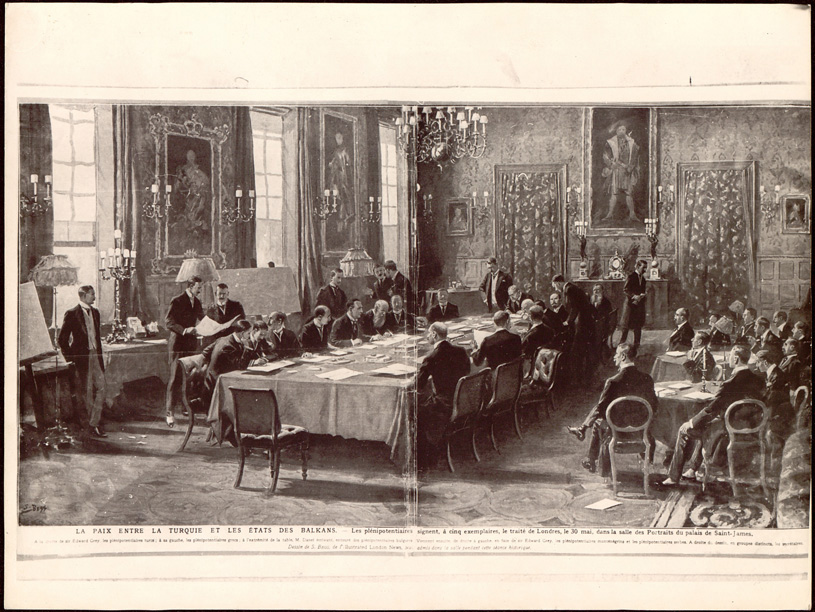
The London Conference which led to Burney being despatched to the Balkans to keep the Peace

In April 1913 Montenegro seized control of Scutari in the latest round of hostilities between the Ottoman Empire and Montenegro during the closing stages of the First Balkan War. The view taken at the London Conference was that Scutari should be handed over to Albania. In April 1913 Burney was sent as temporary Second-in-Command of the Mediterranean Fleet, flying his flag in the cruiser HMS Dublin, to Antivari on the coast of Montenegro to take command of the international naval force despatched to deal with this situation. On arrival he blockaded Antivari and then, from May to November 1913, also commanded the international force occupying Scutari as part of its transition to Albanian control. For his very successful handling of this situation he was appointed Knight Commander of the Order of the Bath (KCB) on 3 June 1913 and appointed Knight Commander of the Order of St Michael and St George (KCMG) on 27 October 1913.

== First World War ==
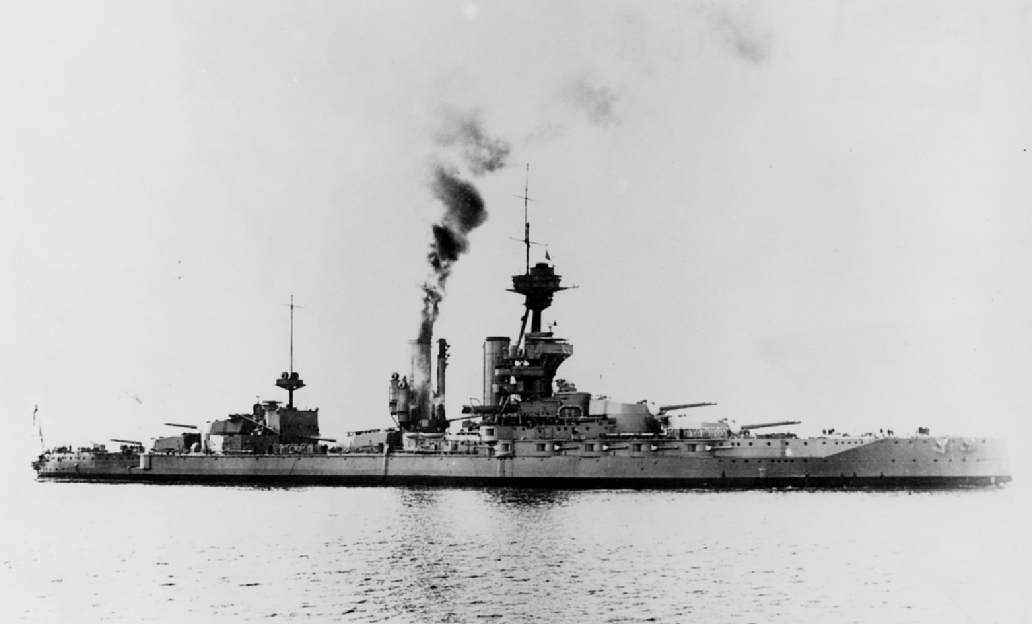
The battleship HMS Marlborough, Burney's flagship at the Battle of Jutland

Burney returned to England and took command of the Second Fleet and Third Fleet, with his flag in the battleship HMS Queen in December 1913 and then in the battleship HMS Lord Nelson in July 1914. On the outbreak of the First World War in August 1914 these fleets were combined into the Channel Fleet with Burney in command. In that role he ensured the safe passage of the British Expeditionary Force to France in October 1914. He went on to be commander of the 1st Battle Squadron as well as second-in-command of the Grand Fleet with his flag in the battleship HMS Marlborough in December 1914. He commanded the squadron at the Battle of Jutland in May 1916, where his flagship HMS Marlborough was the first ship to engage the Germans but was later torpedoed, necessitating the transfer of his flag to the battleship HMS Revenge. Promoted full admiral on 9 June 1916, he was appointed Knight Grand Cross of the Order of St Michael and St George (GCMG) on 15 September 1916.

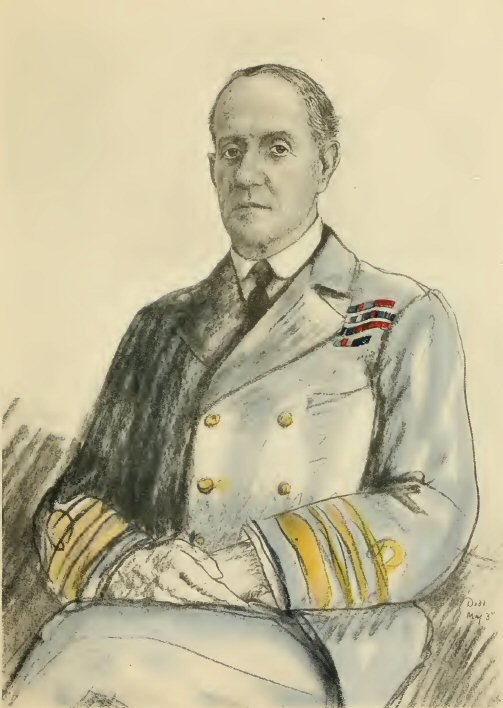
A 1917 portrait of Cecil Burney by Francis Dodd.

Burney was appointed Second Sea Lord in November 1916. However, in September 1917 he was removed, despite the opposition of First Sea Lord Sir John Jellicoe, on the insistence of both the Prime Minister David Lloyd George and the First Lord of the Admiralty Eric Geddes, who wanted a younger man in the post. Burney became Commander-in-Chief, Coast of Scotland instead in October 1917.

== Post-war career ==
Burney became Commander-in-Chief, Portsmouth in March 1919. He became a Deputy Lieutenant of Southampton on 5 May 1920. He was also promoted Admiral of the Fleet on 24 November 1920, created a baronet in the 1921 New Year Honours, and appointed Knight Grand Cross of the Order of the Bath (GCB) in the 1922 New Year Honours. He officially retired on 24 November 1925, died at his home at Upham in Hampshire on 5 June 1929 and was buried at Brookwood Cemetery.

== Family ==
In 1884 Burney married Lucinda Burnett; they had two daughters, and a son. His son Dennistoun Burney became a marine and aeronautical engineer, and his daughter Sybil Katherine Neville-Rolfe was founder of the Eugenics Society.

== Honours ==
Burney's honours included:

- Knight Grand Cross of the Bath (GCB) – 1 January 1922 (KCB – 3 June 1913)
- Knight Grand Cross of the Order of St Michael and St George – 15 September 1916 (KCMG – 27 October 1913)
- Grand Officer of the French Legion of Honour – 15 September 1916
- Russian Order of St. Vladimir, 2nd Class (with Swords) – 5 June 1917
- Grand Cross of the Italian Order of Saints Maurice and Lazarus – 11 August 1917
- Grand Cordon of the Japanese Order of the Rising Sun – 29 August 1917
- Grand Cordon of the Belgian Order of Leopold – 29 November 1918
- American Distinguished Service Medal – 16 September 1919
- French Croix de Guerre – 22 January 1920

== Sources ==
- Heathcote, Tony (2002). The British Admirals of the Fleet 1734 – 1995. Pen & Sword Ltd. ISBN 0-85052-835-6.

Military offices
| Preceded by Sir John Jellicoe | Vice-Admiral Commanding, Atlantic Fleet; 1911–1912 | Post abolished |
| New post | Vice-Admiral Commanding 3rd Battle Squadron; 1912–1913 | Succeeded by Lewis Bayly |
| Preceded by Sir Frederick Hamilton | Vice-Admiral Commanding 2nd and 3rd Fleets/Channel Fleet; 1913–1914 | Unknown |
| Preceded by Sir Lewis Bayly | Vice-Admiral Commanding 1st Battle Squadron; 1914–1916 | Succeeded by Sir Charles Madden |
| Preceded by Sir Somerset Gough-Calthorpe | Second Sea Lord; 1916–1917 | Succeeded by Sir Rosslyn Wemyss |
| Preceded by Sir Frederick Hamilton | Commander-in-Chief, Coast of Scotland; 1917–1919 | Succeeded by Sir Herbert Heath |
| Preceded by Sir Stanley Colville | Commander-in-Chief, Portsmouth; 1919–1920 | Succeeded by Sir Somerset Gough-Calthorpe |
Baronetage of the United Kingdom
| New title | Baronet (of Preston Candover); 1921–1929 | Succeeded by Dennistoun Burney |
