= HMS Sappho (1891) =

Apollo-class cruiser

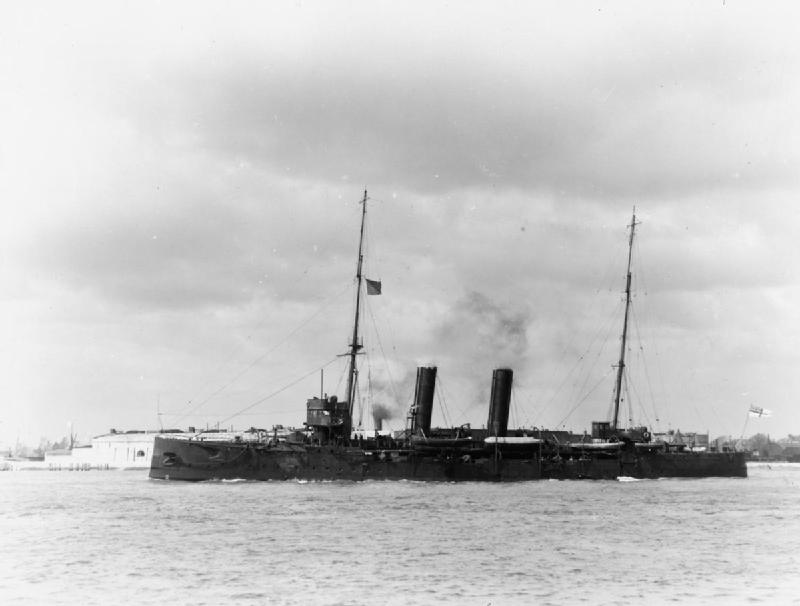

History

United Kingdom
- Name: HMS Sappho
- Builder: Samuda Brothers, Cubitt Town, London
- Laid down: 1890
- Launched: 9 May 1891
- Commissioned: 1893
- Fate: Broken Up 1921

General characteristics
- Class & type: Apollo-class cruiser
- Displacement: 3,600 tons
- Length: 314 ft (95.7 m)
- Beam: 43.5 ft (13.3 m)
- Draught: 17.5 ft (5.3 m)
- Propulsion: twin screw triple expansion engines
- Speed: 19.75 knots
- Complement: 273 to 300 (Officers and Men)
- Armament: As built: 2 × QF 6-inch (152.4 mm) guns; 6 × QF 4.7 inch (120 mm) guns; 8 × 6-pounders; 2 to 4 × 14 inch torpedo tubes

HMS Sappho was an Apollo-class cruiser of the British Royal Navy which served from 1892 to 1918 in various colonial posts as well as around Britain.

From 1900 she served as a troop ship during the Second Boer War, but in June 1901 she went aground while crossing the Durban Bar and had to leave for repairs in the United Kingdom. She was escorted from Las Palmas by HMS Furious and arrived at Sheerness on 21 August 1901, proceeding to Chatham for repairs the following day. She was paid off at Chatham 18 September 1901.

On the night of 19 June 1909 Sappho was rammed by a Wilson Line steamer which collided with Sappho in thick fog off Dungeness. The cruiser was holed below the waterline, flooding her engine room. The cruiser almost sank, but was saved by tugs and was taken to Chatham for repair. Despite the damage, with an 8 by 6 feet (2.4 m × 1.8 m) hole in her hull, the cruiser was repaired and able to return to service within six days. On 30 September 1909 Sappho was paid off at Portsmouth Dockyard for a refit.

On the outbreak of the First World War in August 1914, Sappho was attached to the Grand Fleet. While other ships of the Apollo-class had been converted to minelayers, Sappho was initially deployed on patrol purposes, operating north-east of Shetland in early October 1914 as part of extensive deployments of the Grand Fleet to prevent German interference with a convoy carrying troops from Canada to England and north of Orkney later that month. Sappho continued on patrol duties, and was placed in charge of four Armed Boarding Steamers, which were tasked with patrolling to the north-west of the Hebrides, to stop merchant ships suspected of carrying contraband bound for Germany.

In May 1918, Sappho was ordered to be scuttled in the mouth of Ostend harbour in Belgium following the failed First Ostend Raid. The Second Ostend Raid operation (of which Sappho was a part) was intended to block the harbour mouth and prevent the transit of German U-boats and other raiding craft from Bruges to the North Sea. Whilst travelling from Dunkirk to Ostend on the day of the attack however, Sappho suffered severe engine damage in a minor boiler explosion and was forced to retire, taking no part in the raid. She was not used again during the war, and was scrapped in 1921.

== Commanding officers ==
- Captain Cecil Burney - 1900 - September 1901

== Publications ==
- Colledge, J. J.; Warlow, Ben (2006) [1969]. Ships of the Royal Navy: The Complete Record of All Fighting Ships of the Royal Navy from the 15th Century to the Present (3rd Rev ed.). London: Chatham Publishing. ISBN 978-1-86176-281-8. OCLC 67375475.
- Monograph No. 23: Home Waters—Part I: From the Outbreak of War to 27 August 1914 (PDF). Naval Staff Monographs (Historical). Vol. X. The Naval Staff, Training and Staff Duties Division. 1924.
- Monograph No. 24: Home Waters—Part II: September and October 1914 (PDF). Naval Staff Monographs (Historical). Vol. XI. The Naval Staff, Training and Staff Duties Division. 1924.
- Monograph No. 28: Home Waters—Part III. From November 1914 to the end of January 1915 (PDF). Naval Staff Monographs (Historical). Vol. XII. The Naval Staff, Training and Staff Duties Division. 1925.
