= 7th Battle Squadron =

Former battleship formation of the Royal Navy

- Active: 1912–1914
- Country: United Kingdom
- Branch: Royal Navy
- Type: Squadron
- Part of: Third Fleet

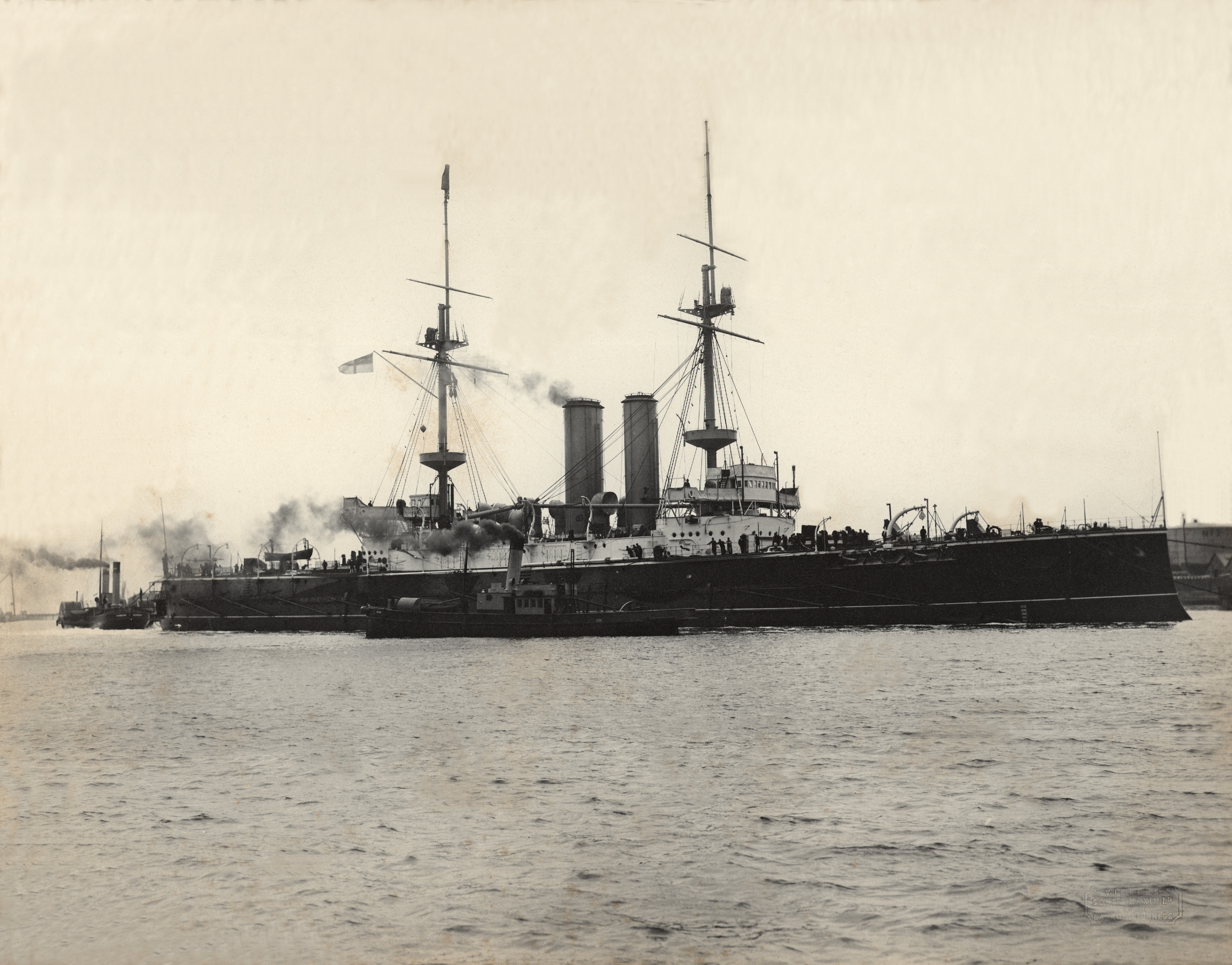
HMS Vengeance 2nd Flag Ship of squadron

The 7th Battle Squadron was a squadron of the British Royal Navy assembled prior to World War I it was assigned to the Third Fleet and consisted of pre-dreadnought type battleships the oldest ships in fleet it existed from 1912 to 1914.

== History ==
The squadron was established on 2 July 1912 when Vice-Admiral Sir Henry Jackson assumed command. His second in command Rear-Admiral Charles Dundas was also appointed. The squadron was attached to the Third Fleet. On 13 July 1914 Vice-Admiral Sir Alexander Bethell succeeded Vice-Admiral Sir Henry Jackson. On 8 August 1914 the 7th Battle Squadron was absorbed into the 8th Battle Squadron, which consisted of the oldest pre-dreadnought battleships of the Royal Navy.

== Vice-Admirals commanding ==
Post holders included:

	Rank	Flag	Name	Term
Vice-Admiral Commanding, 7th Battle Squadron
1	Vice-Admiral	Vice-Admiral - Royal Navy	Sir Henry B. Jackson	2 July 1912 – July, 1914
2	Vice-Admiral	Vice-Admiral - Royal Navy	Sir Hon. Alexander E. Bethell	August, - September, 1914

== Rear-Admirals, Second in command ==
Post holders included:

	Rank	Flag	Name	Term
Rear-Admiral, Second-in-Command, 7th Battle Squadron
1	Rear-Admiral	Rear-Admiral - Royal Navy	Sir Charles Hope Dundas	2 July 1912 – 13 July 1914
2	Rear-Admiral	Rear-Admiral - Royal Navy	Sir Hon. Cecil F. Thursby	13 July, - 27 July 1914
