= 8th Cruiser Squadron =

Cruiser formation of the Royal Navy

- Active: 1912-1914, 1924-1942
- Country: United Kingdom
- Allegiance: British Empire
- Branch: Royal Navy

Commanders
- Notable commanders: Rear-Admiral John M. de Robeck

The 8th Cruiser Squadron was a temporary formation of cruisers of the British Royal Navy from 1912 to 1914. and again from 1924/25 to 1942.

The Royal Navy's cruiser squadrons contained a maximum of five to six ships but down as low as two to three ships. From 1914 they were usually designated as Light Cruiser Squadrons, while after 1925 they were re-designated Cruiser Squadrons.

== History ==
=== First Formation ===
The 8th Cruiser Squadron was a temporary naval unit attached to the Third Fleet. The then Admiral of Patrols, Rear-Admiral J. M. de Robeck, assumed command on 26 July 1914, (for Test Mobilisation), however the squadron was never officially constituted. De Robeck was then given command of the 9th Cruiser Squadron also known as Cruiser Force I on 4 August 1914.

=== Second Formation ===
In 1924/25 the 8th Light Cruiser Squadron was re-designated 8th Cruiser Squadron and came under the direct command of the Commander-in-Chief North America and West Indies, based at the Royal Naval Dockyard, on Ireland Island in the Imperial fortress colony of Bermuda, until 1942.

== Rear/Vice-Admiral commanding ==
=== First Formation ===
	Rank	Flag	Name	Term	Notes
Rear-Admiral Commanding, 8th Cruiser Squadron
1	Rear-Admiral	Rear-Admiral - Royal Navy	John M. de Robeck	26 July 1914	

Squadron disbanded

=== Second formation ===
Of note: The squadron was under direct command of the Commander-in-Chief, North America and West Indies

	Rank	Flag	Name	Term	Notes
CinC NAWI/Vice-Admiral Commanding, 8th Cruiser Squadron
1	Vice-Admiral	Vice-Admiral - Royal Navy	Sir James Fergusson	May 1924-June 1926	
2	Vice-Admiral	Vice-Admiral - Royal Navy	Sir Walter Cowan	June 1926-July 1928	
3	Vice-Admiral	Vice-Admiral - Royal Navy	Sir Cyril Fuller	May 1930-April 1932	
4	Vice-Admiral	Vice-Admiral - Royal Navy	Sir Vernon Haggard	May 1930-April 1932	
5	Vice-Admiral	Vice-Admiral - Royal Navy	Sir Reginald Plunkett	April 1932-November 1934	
6	Vice-Admiral	Vice-Admiral - Royal Navy	Sir Matthew Best	November 1934-May 1937	
7	Vice-Admiral	Vice-Admiral - Royal Navy	Sir Sidney Meyrick	May 1937-April 1940	
8	Vice-Admiral	Vice-Admiral - Royal Navy	Charles Kennedy-Purvis	April 1940-April 1942	
9	Vice-Admiral	Vice-Admiral - Royal Navy	Alban Curteis	April 1942-July 1942	
