= First Fleet (United Kingdom) =

Former naval fleet of the Royal Navy

- Active: 31 July 1912 – August 1914
- Country: United Kingdom
- Branch: Royal Navy
- Type: Fleet

The First Fleet was a formation of the Royal Navy that briefly existed before the First World War from 1912 to 1914.

== History ==
The First Fleet was formed on 31 July 1912, with the Commander-in-Chief Home Fleets in direct command of it; a vice admiral commanded the Second and Third Fleets. The numbered fleets during this period had different levels of battle readiness; ships of the First Fleet ships were in full commission.

The First Fleet included four destroyer flotillas under Captain Cecil Lambert. Captain Reginald Tyrwhitt took over the command of the destroyer flotillas in December 1913.

== Commanders ==
	Rank	Flag	Name	Term
Commander-in-Chief, Home Fleets/First Fleet
1	Admiral	Admiral - Royal Navy	Sir George Callaghan	31 July 1912 – December 1914

== Components ==
Included

	Unit	Notes
1	1st Battle Squadron	(8 battleships)
2	2nd Battle Squadron	(8 battleships)
3	3rd Battle Squadron	(8 pre-dreadnoughts)
4	4th Battle Squadron	(4 battleships)
5	1st Cruiser Squadron	(4 cruisers then to Battle-Cruiser Squadron 01.13)
6	2nd Cruiser Squadron	(4-5 cruisers)
7	3rd Cruiser Squadron	(5-7 cruisers)
8	4th Cruiser Squadron	(7-8 cruisers)
9	1st Light Cruiser Squadron	(14 cruisers assigned-reassigned between 1913 and 1914)
10	1st Destroyer Flotilla	(1 scout cruiser, 20 destroyers)
11	2nd Destroyer Flotilla	(1 scout cruiser, 20 destroyers)
12	3rd Destroyer Flotilla	(1 scout cruiser,16 destroyers -all to Med as 5th DF, 1913, replaced by 4 destroyers)
13	4th Destroyer Flotilla	(1 scout cruiser, 12 destroyers + 18 K. Class, 1912–13)

== Sources ==
- Government, H.M. (October 1913). "List of officers on active list of the Royal Navy with the dates of their seniority". The Navy List. H.M Stationery Office.
