= 11th Cruiser Squadron =

- Active: 1914–1917, 1939-1940
- Country: United Kingdom
- Branch: Royal Navy

Commanders
- Notable commanders: Rear-Admiral Sir Horace Hood

The 11th Cruiser Squadron and also known as Cruiser Force E was a formation of cruisers of the British Royal Navy from 1914 to 1917 and again from 1939 to 1940.

== First World War ==
The squadron was first formed in July 1914 and was attached to the Third Fleet. In August 1914 it was reassigned to the Channel Fleet. It was designated Cruiser Force E for service off the west coast of Ireland and was dispersed by January 1915.

=== Rear-Admiral/Senior Officer Commanding ===
Included:

	Rank	Flag	Name	Term	Notes
Senior Officer/Rear-Admiral Commanding, 11th Cruiser Squadron
1	Rear-Admiral	Rear-Admiral - Royal Navy	Robert S. Phipps Hornby	1 August 1914 – 5 September 1914	
2	Rear-Admiral	Rear-Admiral - Royal Navy	Henry L. Tottenham,	5 September 1914	
3	Captain		George B. Hutton	16 February 1915	promoted to RAdm 10/1918
4	Rear-Admiral	Rear-Admiral - Royal Navy	Sir Horace L. A. Hood	13 April 1915 – 24 May 1915	
5	Captain	Rear-Admiral - Royal Navy	Drury St. A. Wake	24 May 1915 – 12 March 1917	promoted to Cdre 10/1915. RAdm in 04/1917

== Second World War ==
The squadron reformed in October 1939 when the 12th Cruiser Squadron of the Northern Patrol was re-designated 11th Cruiser Squadron. It was then transferred under the control of the Commander-in-Chief, North Atlantic at Gibraltar until it was disbanded in 1940.

Throughout the period the squadron was commanded by Commodore Richard J.R. Scott, holding the appointment of Commodore Commanding, 11th Cruiser Squadron.
