= 1st Aircraft Carrier Squadron =

Former aircraft carrier formation of the Royal Navy

- White Ensign
- Active: 1943 – 1947
- Country: United Kingdom
- Allegiance: British Empire
- Branch: Royal Navy
- Type: Squadron

Commanders
- Notable commanders: Admiral of the Fleet Sir Philip Louis Vian, GCB, KBE, DSO & Two Bars

The 1st Aircraft Carrier Squadron was a formation of Royal Navy aircraft carriers assigned to the British Pacific Fleet in November 1943. They were: HMS Formidable, HMS Indomitable, HMS Victorious, HMS Illustrious and HMS Indefatigable. It was disbanded in 1947.

== Second World War and aftermath ==
The squadron was formed in November 1943 under the command of Rear-Admiral, Clement Moody, Flag Officer, Aircraft Carriers (British Pacific Fleet), who also held the title of Rear-Admiral, 1st Aircraft Carrier Squadron, at the same time. While serving in the Pacific within the U.S. Fifth Fleet, the squadron was designated "Task Group 57.2". During Operation Iceberg off Okinawa, the squadron received heavy Kamikaze attacks.

Theseus served as squadron flagship for the squadron in 1947.

== Korean War ==
After the war, the "1st Aircraft Carrier Squadron, Far East Fleet" consisting of the carriers Triumph and Unicorn, with the cruiser Belfast as flagship, was en route to Hong Kong from Japan when the Korean War broke out and was sent back to Japan.

== Flag Officer commanding ==
Included:

	Rank	Flag	Name	Term	Notes
Rear-Admiral, 1st Aircraft Carrier Squadron
1	Rear-Admiral	Rear-Admiral - Royal Navy	Clement Moody	November 1943 – November 1944	
2	Vice-Admiral	Rear-Admiral - Royal Navy	Sir Philip L. Vian	November 1944 – 1945	
