= Second Fleet (United Kingdom) =

- Active: 1 May 1912–1914
- Country: United Kingdom
- Branch: Royal Navy
- Type: Fleet

Commanders
- Notable commanders: Vice-Admiral Sir Cecil Burney, Vice-Admiral Sir Frederick T. Hamilton

The Second Fleet was a reserve formation of the Royal Navy that briefly existed before the First World War.

== History ==
Formed on 1 May 1912 from the Third Division of the Home Fleet, its ships were manned by a nucleus crew during peacetime, but were intended to be manned by men from the naval schools when mobilised. It reported directly to the Commander-in-Chief, Home Fleets. The fleet was mobilised in late July 1914 as tensions increased between Great Britain and Imperial Germany and remained on active duty until war was declared on 4 August. It reformed the Channel Fleet upon the declaration of war and consisted of the Fifth and Sixth Battle Squadrons, equipped with a total of 15 pre-dreadnought battleships and the majority of the Home Defence Patrol Flotillas.

== Commanders ==
	Rank	Flag	Name	Term
Vice-Admiral Commanding Second Fleet
1	Vice-Admiral	Vice-Admiral - Royal Navy	Sir Frederick T. Hamilton	May 1912-December 1913
2	Vice-Admiral	Vice-Admiral - Royal Navy	Sir Cecil Burney	December 1913-August 1914

== Components ==
Included

	Unit	Notes
1	5th Battle Squadron	(8 battleships)
2	6th Battle Squadron	(5-7 battleships)
3	5th Cruiser Squadron	(3-4 light cruisers)
4	6th Cruiser Squadron	3–4 armoured cruisers)
5	7th Destroyer Flotilla	20 destroyer-12 torpedo boat)

== Bibliography ==
- Corbett, Julian. Naval Operations to the Battle of the Falklands. History of the Great War: Based on Official Documents. Vol. I (2nd, reprint of the 1938 ed.). London and Nashville, Tennessee: Imperial War Museum and Battery Press. ISBN 0-89839-256-X.
- Marder, Arthur J. (2013) [1961]. From Dreadnought to Scapa Flow: The Royal Navy in the Fisher Era. Vol. I: The Road to War 1904–1914. Annapolis, Maryland: Naval Institute Press. ISBN 9781-59114-259-1.
- Wragg, David (2006). Royal Navy Handbook 1914–1918. Stroud, UK: Sutton Publishing. ISBN 0-7509-4203-7.
