= Third Fleet (United Kingdom) =

Former reserve naval fleet of the Royal Navy

- White Ensign
- Active: 1 May 1912–1914
- Country: United Kingdom
- Branch: Royal Navy
- Type: Reserve fleet
- Size: 2 x Battle squadrons 6 x Cruiser squadrons 3 x Local Defence Flotilla

The Third Fleet was a reserve formation of the Royal Navy that briefly existed before the First World War.

== History ==
Formed on 1 May 1912 from the 4th Division of the Home Fleet, its elderly ships were ordinarily only manned by a small maintenance crew during peacetime, but were intended to be manned by naval reservists when mobilised. It was conducting a test mobilisation in July 1914 as tensions increased between Great Britain and Imperial Germany and was only partially demobilised before full mobilisation was ordered on 2 August. At this time it consisted of the 7th and 8th Battle Squadrons of pre-dreadnought battleships and five squadrons of cruisers.

== Vice-Admiral Commanding ==
	Rank	Flag	Name	Term
Vice-Admiral Commanding Third Fleet
1	Vice-Admiral	Vice-Admiral - Royal Navy	Sir Frederick T. Hamilton	December 1911-December 1913
2	Vice-Admiral	Vice-Admiral - Royal Navy	Sir Cecil Burney	December 1913-August 1914.

== Components ==
Included

	Unit	Notes
1	7th Battle Squadron	(8 pre-dreadnoughts)
2	8th Battle Squadron	(6 pre-dreadnoughts)
3	7th Cruiser Squadron	(5 armoured cruisers)
3	8th Cruiser Squadron	(5 armoured/protected cruisers)
4	9th Cruiser Squadron	(8 armoured/protected cruisers)
5	10th Cruiser Squadron	(7 protected cruisers)-from Training Squadron at Queenstown
6	11th Cruiser Squadron	(5 protected cruisers)
7	12th Cruiser Squadron	(4 protected cruisers)
8	Devonport Local Defence Flotilla	
9	Nore Local Defence Flotilla	
10	Portsmouth Local Defence Flotilla	

== Bibliography ==
- Corbett, Julian. Naval Operations to the Battle of the Falklands. History of the Great War: Based on Official Documents. Vol. I (2nd, reprint of the 1938 ed.). London and Nashville, Tennessee: Imperial War Museum and Battery Press. ISBN 0-89839-256-X.
- Marder, Arthur J. (2013) [1961]. From Dreadnought to Scapa Flow: The Royal Navy in the Fisher Era. Vol. I: The Road to War 1904–1914. Annapolis, Maryland: Naval Institute Press. ISBN 9781-59114-259-1.
- Wragg, David (2006). Royal Navy Handbook 1914–1918. Stroud, UK: Sutton Publishing. ISBN 0-7509-4203-7.
