= Frederick Hamilton (Royal Navy officer) =

Royal Navy Admiral (1856–1917)

Admiral Sir Frederick Hamilton GCVO KCB
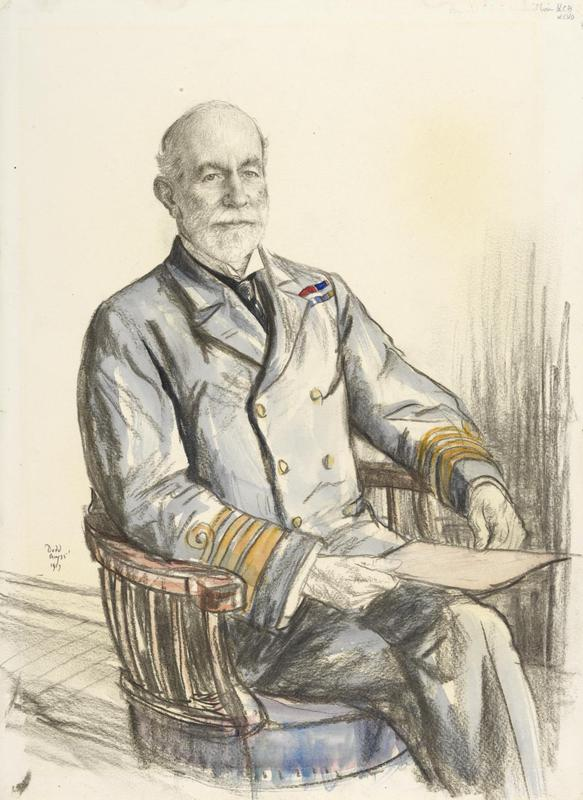
- 1917 portrait by Francis Dodd
- Born: 8 March 1856; London, England
- Died: 4 October 1917 (aged 61); Rosyth, Scotland
- Military career
- Allegiance: United Kingdom
- Branch: Royal Navy
- Service years: 1869–1917
- Rank: Admiral
- Commands: HMS Rattlesnake; HMS Bulwark; Commander-in-Chief, Rosyth
- Conflicts: Zulu War; First World War
- Awards: Knight Grand Cross of the Royal Victorian Order; Knight Commander of the Order of the Bath

Admiral Sir Frederick Tower Hamilton, GCVO, KCB (8 March 1856 – 4 October 1917) was a senior Royal Navy officer who went on to be Second Sea Lord and Chief of Naval Personnel.

== Naval career ==
Hamilton joined the Royal Navy in 1869 as a cadet on the training ship Britannia. He fought in the Naval Brigade in the Zulu War in 1879, for which service he was mentioned in despatches. After promotion to Lieutenant he specialised in the Torpedo Branch and in 1884 after training was appointed a staff officer at the Torpedo Schoolship HMS Vernon. In 1892 he was promoted to commander and serving aboard the battleship HMS Hood. He was appointed in command of the torpedo school ship HMS Defiance at Devonport on 1 November 1897, promoted to captain on 1 January 1898, and re-appointed in command of the Defiance the same day. On 18 March 1902 he was appointed flag captain of the battleship HMS Bulwark, which in May was to become flagship of Admiral Sir Compton Domvile, Commander-in-Chief of the Mediterranean Fleet. Hamilton was Aide-de-Camp to the King between 1906 and 1907.

At the outset of the First World War Hamilton was Second Sea Lord and Chief of Naval Personnel and was promoted to full admiral in June 1916. He went on to be Commander-in-Chief, Rosyth later that year but died suddenly from a heart attack in 1917 and is buried in Rosyth Old Churchyard.

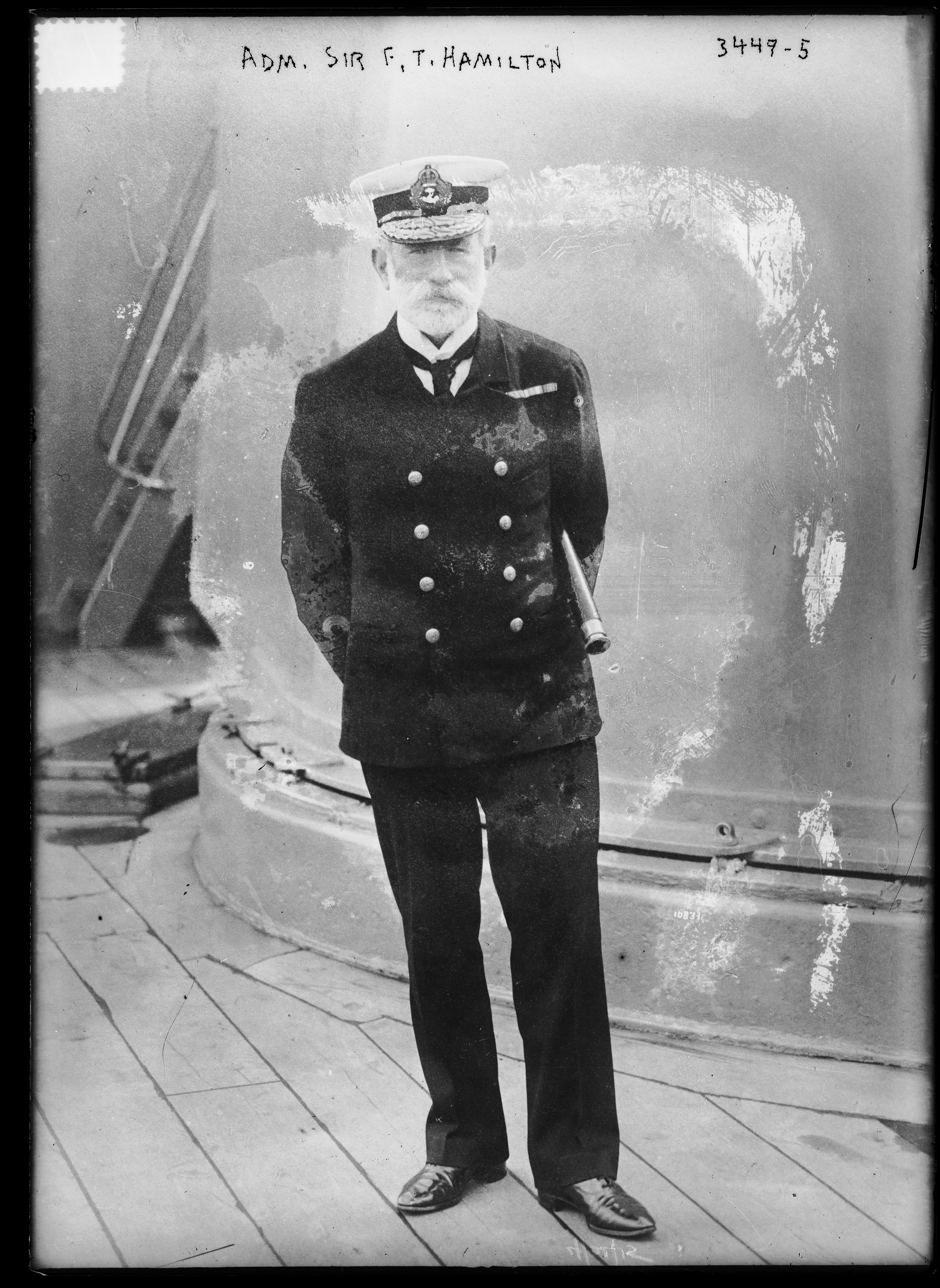

He lived at Anmer Hall near King's Lynn in Norfolk.

== Honours and awards ==
- 21 November 1903 – During the visit of the King to Malta Captain Frederick Tower Hamilton, Royal Navy, Flag Captain to Commander-in-Chief, Malta was appointed a Member of the Royal Victorian Order.
- 9 November 1908 – Rear-Admiral Frederick Tower Hamilton, MVO, was promoted to be a Commander of the Royal Victorian Order
- 1 January 1913 – Vice-Admiral Frederick Tower Hamilton, CVO, was appointed a Knight Commander of the Order of the Bath

== Family ==
Hamilton married Maria Walpole Keppel, the daughter of Admiral Sir Henry Keppel; they went on to have two sons (including Admiral Sir Louis Keppel Hamilton) and two daughters.

Military offices
| Preceded by Sir John Jellicoe | Second Sea Lord; 1914–1916 | Succeeded by Sir Somerset Gough-Calthorpe |
| Preceded by Sir Robert Lowry | Commander-in-Chief, Rosyth; 1916–1917 | Succeeded by Sir Cecil Burney |
