= 9th Cruiser Squadron =

- Active: 1912-1919, 1939-1940
- Country: United Kingdom
- Branch: Royal Navy

Commanders
- Notable commanders: Rear-Admiral Sydney R. Fremantle

The 9th Cruiser Squadron was a formation of cruisers of the Royal Navy from 1912 to 1919 and again from 1939 to 1940. Cruiser squadrons consisted of five to six ships in wartime and in peacetime as low as two to three ships. From 1914 until 1924/25 they were designated as Light Cruiser Squadrons then after 1925 redesignated as Cruiser Squadrons.

== First formation ==
The 9th Cruiser Squadron was first formed in 1912 assigned to the Third Fleet. In August 1914 it was attached to the Channel Fleet. During the war it operated in the North Atlantic and off West Africa, mostly protecting British commerce. It was disbanded in January 1919.

=== Commanders, first formation ===
Post holders included:

	Rank	Flag	Name	Term	Notes
Rear-Admiral Commanding, 9th Cruiser Squadron
1	Rear-Admiral	Rear-Admiral - Royal Navy	John M. de Robeck	September, 1914 - February, 1915	
2	Rear-Admiral	Rear-Admiral - Royal Navy	Sir A. Gordon H. W. Moore	February 1915 -August 1915	
3	Rear-Admiral	Rear-Admiral - Royal Navy	Sydney R. Fremantle	August, 1916 – December, 1916	
4	Rear-Admiral	Rear-Admiral - Royal Navy	Thomas D. L. Sheppard	8 December 1916 – January, 1919	

== Reformation and Second World War ==
The squadron was reformed from July 1939 to June 1940. It was first attached to the Reserve Fleet, then it came under the command of the Commander-in-Chief, South Atlantic. before being disbanded.

=== Commodore/Rear-Admiral commanding ===
Post holders included:

	Rank	Flag	Name	Term	Notes
Commodore/Rear-Admiral, Commanding, 9th Cruiser Squadron
1	Rear-Admiral	Rear-Admiral - Royal Navy	Allan Poland	July 1939-April 1940	
2	Commodore		Cyril G. B. Coltart	January, 1940 – June, 1940	
