= 12th Cruiser Squadron =

- Active: 1914–1915, 1939–1943
- Country: United Kingdom
- Branch: Royal Navy

Commanders
- Notable commanders: Rear-Admiral Rosslyn E. Wemyss

The 12th Cruiser Squadron also known as Cruiser Force G was a formation of cruisers of the British Royal Navy from 1914 to 1915 and then again from 1939 to 1943.

== History ==
=== First formation ===
The squadron was first formed 1 August 1914 and was initially assigned to the Channel Fleet as Cruiser Force G patrolling the western Channel until February 1915. The squadron was then reassigned to the Grand Fleet where it remained before being disbanded in February 1915.

==== Rear-Admiral Commanding ====
Included:

	Rank	Flag	Name	Term	Notes
Rear-Admiral Commanding, 12th Cruiser Squadron
1	Rear-Admiral	Rear-Admiral - Royal Navy	Rosslyn E. Wemyss	1 August 1914 – 15 February 1915	

=== Second and Third formations ===
The squadron reformed in August 1939 initially part of the Northern Patrol of the Home Fleet based at Scapa Flow but was re-designated 11th Cruiser Squadron in October 1939. It re-formed as part of the Mediterranean Fleet in July 1942. It was reassigned from 29 January 1943 to 2 July 1943 when it became a component of Force H and again from 1 October 1943 to December 1943.

==== Rear/Vice-Admiral Commanding ====
Included:

	Rank	Flag	Name	Term	Notes
Rear/Vice-Admiral Commanding, 12th Cruiser Squadron
1	Vice-Admiral	Vice-Admiral - Royal Navy	Sir Max K. Horton	August - 9 September 1939	
2	Rear-Admiral	Rear-Admiral - Royal Navy	W. Frederic Wake-Walker	9 September 1939 – 28 October 1939	
squadron disbanded 11/1939 - 06/1942
3	Rear-Admiral	Rear-Admiral - Royal Navy	Cecil H. J. Harcourt	July, 1942 – December, 1943	also FO 2i/c Force H
