= 6th Cruiser Squadron =

- Active: 1909-1915, 1925-1945
- Country: United Kingdom
- Allegiance: British Empire
- Branch: Royal Navy

Commanders
- Notable commanders: Rear-Admiral David Beatty

The 6th Cruiser Squadron was a formation of cruisers of the British Royal Navy from 1909 to 1915 and again from 1925 to 1945.

The Royal Navy's cruiser squadrons usually contained a maximum of five to six ships but down but sometimes as low as two to three ships. Between 1914 and 1925, they were designated Light Cruiser Squadrons, and after 1925 re-designated Cruiser Squadrons.

== First formation ==
The squadron was established in March 1909. In September 1910, it was attached to the Mediterranean Fleet until April 1912. In May 1912, the 6th Cruiser Squadron was renamed the Mediterranean Cruiser Squadron. The squadron was then reassigned as the 6th Cruiser Squadron to the Second Fleet between May 1912 and July 1914.

=== Rear-Admiral Commanding ===
	Rank	Flag	Name	Term	Notes
Rear-Admiral Commanding, 6th Cruiser Squadron
1	Rear-Admiral	Rear-Admiral - Royal Navy	Henry B. Jackson	March 1909-October 1910	
2	Rear-Admiral	Rear-Admiral - Royal Navy	Sir Douglas A. Gamble	26 September 1910 – 3 June 1912	
3	Rear-Admiral	Rear-Admiral - Royal Navy	David Beatty	2 July 1912 – 27 July 1912	
4	Rear-Admiral	Rear-Admiral - Royal Navy	Dudley R. S. de Chair	15 July 1913	
5	Rear-Admiral	Rear-Admiral - Royal Navy	William L. Grant	1 August 1914 – 12 March 1915	

== Second formation 1925 - 1945 ==
The squadron reformed in 1925 when it was allocated to the Commander-in-Chief, Africa until August 1939 when the post was redesignated Commander-in-Chief, South Atlantic. The posts of the admiral commanding the squadron and the regional Commander-in-Chief were not usually separated. It remained attached there until 1945 when it was disbanded.

=== Admirals Commanding ===
	Rank	Flag	Name	Term	Notes
CinC Africa/Vice-Admiral Commanding, 6th Cruiser Squadron
1	Vice-Admiral	Vice-Admiral - Royal Navy	Sir Maurice Fitzmaurice	February, 1925 -February. 1927	
2	Vice-Admiral	Vice-Admiral - Royal Navy	Sir David Anderson	February. 1927 - December, 1928	
3	Vice-Admiral	Vice-Admiral - Royal Navy	Sir Rudolf Burmester	February, 1929 - February, 1931	
4	Vice-Admiral	Vice-Admiral - Royal Navy	Sir Hugh Tweedie	February, 1931 - March, 1933	
5	Vice-Admiral	Vice-Admiral - Royal Navy	Sir Edward Evans	March, 1933 -September, 1935	
6	Vice-Admiral	Vice-Admiral - Royal Navy	Sir Francis Tottenham	September, 1935 - January, 1938	
7	Vice-Admiral	Vice-Admiral - Royal Navy	Sir George Lyon	January, 1938 - August, 1939	
CinC, South Atlantic/Rear/Vice-Admiral, Commanding 6th Cruiser Squadron
8	Vice-Admiral	Vice-Admiral - Royal Navy	Sir Sir George Lyon	September, 1939 - September, 1940	
9	Rear-Admiral	Rear-Admiral - Royal Navy	Sir Robert Raikes	September, 1940 -February, 1941	(later V.Adm)
10	Rear-Admiral	Rear-Admiral - Royal Navy	Sir Algernon Willis	February, 1941 - March, 1942	(later V.Adm)
11	Rear-Admiral	Rear-Admiral - Royal Navy	W. E, Campbell Tait	March, 1942 - April, 1944	(later V.Adm)
12	Vice-Admiral	Vice-Admiral - Royal Navy	Sir Robert Burnett	April, 1944 - 1945	
