= 8th Battle Squadron =

Former battleship formation of the Royal Navy

- White Ensign
- Active: 1912–1914
- Country: United Kingdom
- Branch: Royal Navy
- Type: Squadron
- Part of: Third Fleet
- Equipment: Pre-dreadnought battleship

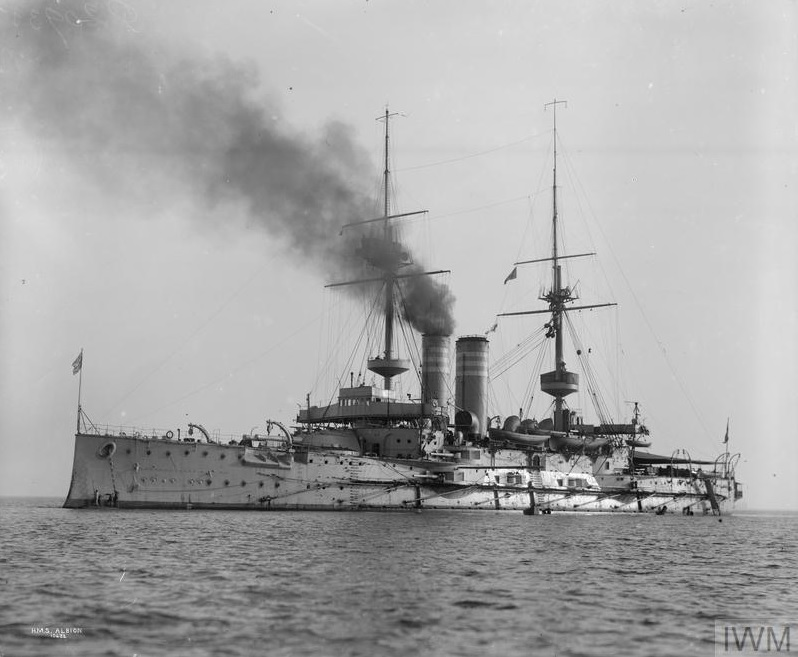
HMS Albion, the squadron's first flag ship

The 8th Battle Squadron was a squadron of the British Royal Navy assembled prior to the beginning of World War I; it was later assigned to the Third Fleet. The squadron consisted of pre-dreadnought type battleships. It existed from 1912 to 1914.

The squadron was established in December 1912. In December 1913 it was assigned to the Third Fleet and in August 1914 it was based at HMNB Devonport. The Third Fleet included the 7th and 8th Battle Squadrons, and consisted of the Royal Navy's oldest battleships and cruisers.

== Rear-Admirals, commanding ==
Post holders included:

	Rank	Flag	Name	Term
Rear-Admiral, Commanding, 8th Battle Squadron
1	Rear-Admiral	Rear-Admiral - Royal Navy	Robert S. P. Hornby	1912 – July, 1914
2	Rear-Admiral	Rear-Admiral - Royal Navy	Henry Loftus Tottenham	13 July, - 27 July 1914

== Bibliography ==
- Harley, Simon; Lovell, Tony. "Eighth Battle Squadron (Royal Navy) - The Dreadnought Project". www.dreadnoughtproject.org. Harley & Lovell, 10 November 2016.
- Mackie, Colin. "Royal Navy Senior Appointments from 1865" (PDF). gulabin. Colin Mackie, December 2017.
- Smith, Gordon. "Royal Navy ship dispositions 1914-1918: THE GRAND FLEET, 1914-1916 by Admiral Viscount Jellicoe". www.naval-history.net. Gordon Smith, 6 January 2015.
