= Red Sea and Canal Area =

Red Sea Station
- Active: 1846-1944-45
- Country: United Kingdom
- Allegiance: British Empire
- Branch: Royal Navy
- Type: Naval station
- Part of: East Indies Station (1846-1883); Mediterranean Fleet (1883-1913); East Indies Station (1914-1941); Mediterranean Fleet (1941-1943); Commander-in-Chief, Levant (1943-1944); East Indies Station (1944-1945)
- Garrison/HQ: Aden then Port Tawfiq

Commanders
- Notable commanders: Rear-Admiral Ronald H. C. Hallifax

The Red Sea Station was a military formation of the Royal Navy. At various times it has also been referred to as Egypt Division and Red Sea and later the Red Sea and Canal Area. The Royal Navy had distinct formations for the Red Sea at intervals from 1846 until circa 1944-45.

== History ==
In 1884-85, Commodore Robert More-Molyneux commanded the ships in the Red Sea, seemingly the Red Sea Division, during the Mahdist War. He protected Suakin till the arrival of Sir Gerald Graham's expedition in 1885.

The Royal Navy established a Red Sea formation as early as 1846, administered by the Royal Indian Navy. It was subordinate to the Commander-in-Chief, East Indies until 1883, when it became part of the Mediterranean Fleet. In 1914 the station came under command of the Commander-in-Chief Mediterranean Fleet until the end of the war. Following the war the Red Sea was reabsorbed back under the Commander-in-Chief, East Indies.

During the East African Campaign, the Red Sea Force fought the Italians. British code-breakers of the Government Code and Cypher School (GC&CS) at Bletchley Park in the UK, deciphered Italian orders of 19 May 1940, coded using C38m machines, secretly to mobilise the army and air force in East Africa. Merchant traffic was stopped by the British on 24 May, pending the introduction of a convoy system. The Senior Naval Officer Red Sea, Rear-Admiral Murray, operational at Aden since April with the light cruisers HMS Liverpool and HMAS Hobart (Liverpool was replaced by HMS Leander), was reinforced by the anti-aircraft cruiser HMS Carlisle, which sailed south with Convoy BS 4, the 28th Destroyer Flotilla comprising HMS Khartoum, Kimberley, Kingston and Kandahar and three sloops from the Mediterranean. The force was to conduct a blockade Italian East Africa (Operation Begum), attack the Red Sea Flotilla and protect the sea lanes from Aden to Suez.

On 21 October 1941 the Mediterranean Fleet's responsibilities were extended to include the Red Sea and Aden, including the Gulf of Aden. The Mediterranean Fleet thus took over the Red Sea Division of the Red Sea Station, which was located between the Gulf of Aden and the Suez Canal, excluding Suez Port. Rear-Admiral Ronald Hallifax took command as Flag Officer, Red Sea (FORS). Three weeks later the responsibilities were adjusted once more. On 14 November 1941 the Senior Naval Officer-in-Charge, Suez, who was based at Port Tawfik (Suez Port) was placed under the command of Rear Admiral Hallifax.

Over a hundred kilometres to the north, halfway up the Suez Canal, the Senior British Naval Officer, Suez Canal Area, based at Ismailia, remained responsible for all British naval policy questions in regards to the Suez Canal Company.

In January 1944 the station was transferred back from the Mediterranean Fleet to C-in-C East Indies.

== Rear-Admiral, Egypt and Red Sea ==
Post holders included:

Note:Command is also known as Egypt Division and Red Sea.

	Rank	Flag	Name	Term	Notes/Ref
Rear-Admiral, Egypt and Red Sea
1	Rear Admiral	Rear-Admiral - Royal Navy	Thomas Jackson	6 July 1917 – 28 December 1918	
2	Rear Admiral	Rear-Admiral - Royal Navy	Henry B. Pelly	24 December 1918 – March, 1920	

=== Senior Naval Officer, Red Sea Patrol ===
Incomplete list of post holders included:

	Rank	Flag	Name	Term	Notes/Ref
Senior Naval Officer, Red Sea Patrol
1	Captain		William H. D. Boyle	March 1916 – December 1918	

== Senior Naval Officer, Red Sea Force ==
	Rank	Flag	Name	Term	Notes/Ref
Senior Naval Officer, Red Sea Force
1	Rear-Admiral	Rear-Admiral - Royal Navy	A. J. L. Murray	24 May 1939 - 1 April 1941	
2	Rear-Admiral	Rear-Admiral - Royal Navy	Ronald H. C. Hallifax	1 April 1941 – 21 October 1941	

=== Senior Naval Officer, Red Sea ===
Incomplete list of post holders included:

	Rank	Insig	Name	Term	Notes/Ref
Senior Naval Officer, Red Sea
1	Captain		John Campbell Annesley	2 June 1939 to 19 January 1940	
2	Captain		H. E. Horan	19 January 1940 to 29 June 1940	

== Flag Officer, Red Sea ==
	Rank	Flag	Name	Term
Flag Officer Commanding, Red Sea
1	Rear-Admiral	Rear-Admiral - Royal Navy	Ronald H. C. Hallifax	21 October 1941 to 17 May 1942

=== Senior Naval Officer in Charge, Suez ===
Included:

	Rank	Flag	Name	Term	Notes/Ref
Senior Naval Officer in Charge, Suez
1	Commodore		Charles A. A. Larcom	14 November 1941 – 13 May 1942	

== Flag Officer Commanding, Red Sea and Canal Area ==
	Rank	Flag	Name	Term
Flag Officer Commanding, Red Sea and Canal Area
1	Rear-Admiral	Rear-Admiral - Royal Navy	Ronald H. C. Hallifax	18 May 1942 – 6 November 1943 (died in office)
2	Rear-Admiral	Rear-Admiral - Royal Navy	John Waller	6 November – 28 December 1943
3	Commodore		Douglas Young-Jamieson	28 December 1943 – 31 October 1944

Commodore Young-Jamieson's broad pennant was seemingly borne in HMS Stag (shore establishment), which was the name used for the base for British naval personnel in Egypt. First established at Port Said, it was commissioned on 8 January 1940. There were outposts at Adabya, Kabrit, Ismailia, Generiffa, Port Tewfik. HMS Stag was paid off in May 1949.

HMS Euphrates at Basra seemingly reported to Flag Officer, Red Sea and Canal Area, from its establishment in 1942.
