= Michael Culme-Seymour =

Michael Culme-Seymour may refer to one of three naval commanders of the Royal Navy, father, son and grandson:

- Sir Michael Culme-Seymour, 3rd Baronet (1836–1920), Admiral, Commander-in-Chief at Portsmouth, commanded the Mediterranean and Channel fleets and the Pacific squadron, also Vice-Admiral of the United Kingdom
- Sir Michael Culme-Seymour, 4th Baronet (1867–1925), Vice-Admiral, served during World War I, Commander-in-Chief on the North America and West Indies Station, and Second Sea Lord
- Sir Michael Culme-Seymour, 5th Baronet (1909–1999), Commander, served during World War II, High Sheriff of Northamptonshire

== See also ==
- Sir Michael Seymour, 1st Baronet, Admiral, grandfather to the 3rd Baronet (the 2nd Baronet took the name "Culme")
- Michael Seymour (Royal Navy officer), Admiral, uncle to the 3rd Baronet
