= Geoffrey Miles =

Royal Navy Admiral (1890–1986)

Admiral Sir Geoffrey Miles KCB KCSI
- Born: 2 May 1890; Chelsea, London
- Died: 31 December 1986 (aged 96); Holyport, Maidenhead, Berkshire
- Military career
- Allegiance: United Kingdom; British India
- Branch: Royal Navy; Royal Indian Navy
- Service years: 1905–1948
- Rank: Admiral
- Commands: HMS Pangbourne (1931–1932); HMS Codrington (1935–1937); Captain (D) 3rd Destroyer Flotilla (Mediterranean); HMS Nelson (1939–1941); Head of the British Military Mission in Moscow (1941–1943); Naval Force Commander, Eastern Expeditionary Force; Deputy Naval Commander, South East Asia Command, East Indies Station; Flag Officer, Western Mediterranean; Senior British Representative on the Tripartite Naval Commission (Berlin) (concurrently Senior British Representative on the Tripartite Merchant Marine Commission); Flag Officer Commanding, Royal Indian Navy (1946–1947)
- Conflicts: World War I World War II
- Awards: Knight Commander of the KCB (1945); KCSI (1948); Companion of the CB (1942); Legion of Honour (1944)

Admiral Sir Geoffrey John Audley Miles, KCB, KCSI (2 May 1890 – 31 December 1986) was a senior Royal Navy admiral who served as Deputy Naval Commander, South East Asia Command under Lord Mountbatten during the Second World War, as the Senior British Representative on the Tripartite Naval Commission and as the last Commander-in-Chief, Indian Navy of the unified Royal Indian Navy.

== Early life ==
Miles was born in Chelsea, London, the third son of Audley Charles Miles (1855–1919) and Eveline Frances Cradock-Hartopp (1856–1946). He was the great-grandson of Philip John Miles and thus related to Philip Napier Miles, Frank Miles and Sir William Miles, 1st Baronet. He was educated at Bedford School, aboard HMS Britannia, and joined the Royal Navy in 1905 as a midshipman. Specialising as a navigation officer, he first served aboard the ships HMS Victorious (1906–1908) and HMS King Edward VII (1908–1910). From 1910 to 1912, Miles was lent to the Royal New Zealand Navy, and served on HMNZS Leander. He was promoted to lieutenant in 1911, and the following year was made the assistant to the navigator on HMS Neptune, the flagship of the Home Fleet, and was then made navigator of HMS Surprise (HMS Alacrity) on the China Station, serving there until 1914.

== Navigation officer ==
During the First World War, Miles served as navigator of several ships, HMS Empress of Russia, an armed merchant cruiser in the Indian Ocean (1914–1915), HMS Botha, a cruiser in the Grand Fleet (1915–1916) and HMS Fearless, a light cruiser in the Grand Fleet (1916–1919). In 1919, he received a promotion to lieutenant-commander.

Miles then attended the Royal Navy Staff College aboard HMS President, and was assigned as a staff officer aboard HMS Coventry in 1920, under the Rear-Admiral Commanding Destroyers in the Atlantic Fleet. He was appointed as the navigating officer of the same ship in 1922 and was promoted to commander two years later; he was also appointed the Squadron Navigating Officer (Destroyers) in the Mediterranean Fleet. He was then assigned to the operations staff of the 3rd Battle Squadron in the Mediterranean (1925–1926) and then to the staff of the Vice-Admiral Commanding 1st Battle Squadron & Vice-Admiral Second-in-Command, Mediterranean Fleet. He served in this capacity aboard the battleship HMS Barham from 1926 to 1927.

After eleven months of gyrocompass instruction at the Admiralty Compass Observatory (Ditton Park, Langley), Miles was assigned as the navigation officer aboard the battlecruiser HMS Hood from January 1927 to May 1929, also serving as the Staff Officer (Operations) and Squadron Navigating Officer, Battle Cruiser Squadron (Atlantic Fleet). He then attended the Staff College at Greenwich, and worked in the Plans Division of the Admiralty from November 1929 to August 1931, receiving a promotion to captain in July 1931. From 1931 to 1932, he commanded the minesweeper HMS Pangbourne, then served as assistant director and acting director of the RN Staff College at Portsmouth from 1933 to 1935. Appointed as Captain (D) 3rd Destroyer Flotilla (Mediterranean) and as Commanding Officer, HMS Codrington in 1935, Miles served in this capacity until July 1937, when he was assigned to the RN Tactical School at Portsmouth aboard HMS Victory. He first served there as assistant director (1937–1938) and subsequently as director (1938–1939).

== Wartime ==
In July 1939, Miles was appointed as commanding officer of the battleship HMS Nelson and as the flag captain, Home Fleet, in which capacity he served for the first half of the war. He was promoted to rear-admiral in 1941 and was appointed as the naval aide-de-camp to George VI from January through July 1941. He was appointed a CB in the 1942 Birthday Honours and headed the British Military Mission to the Soviet Union from June 1941 through March 1943. He then served on the staff of the Commander-in-Chief, Levant in Alexandria, Egypt until July, then as Naval Force Commander, Eastern Expeditionary Force, at Bombay until December. On 20 December, he was appointed as deputy naval commander, South East Asia Command under Lord Mountbatten on 20 December, headquartered at New Delhi. In March 1944, Miles was promoted to vice-admiral, and in July 1944, was appointed Flag Officer, Western Mediterranean, (RN base, Taranto, Italy) where he concluded his wartime service. He was knighted with the KCB in the 1945 Birthday Honours and also appointed a Knight of the Legion of Honour by the French government for his service in the Mediterranean.

== Postwar ==
In August 1945, Miles was appointed as the Senior British Representative on the Tripartite Naval Commission in Berlin, simultaneously serving as Senior British Representative on the Tripartite Merchant Marine Commission. Early in 1946, he was appointed as the final Commander-in-Chief, Indian Navy of the unified Royal Indian Navy, relinquishing his post on the day of Indian independence. He was appointed a KCSI in the 1948 New Year Honours for his service in India, becoming one of the final recipients of the order.

Miles retired in April 1948 with the rank of admiral. He was chairman of the naval charity, the Royal Navy Club of 1765 and 1785 (United 1889), in 1953. He died on New Year's Eve, 1986 at Holyport, Maidenhead, Berkshire, aged 96.

== Personal life ==
On 22 February 1918, Miles married Alison Mary Cadell (13 October 1898 – 20 May 1981), the daughter of Henry Moubray Cadell (1860–1934), geologist and geographer, and Elinor Simson (1868–1943). The couple had two sons: Lieutenant-Commander Peter Tremayne Miles, RN (1920–1995) and Lieutenant Archibald Geoffrey Miles, Royal Artillery (1922–1993).

== Honours ==
(ribbon bar, as it would look today)

Military offices
Preceded by John Godfrey	Commander-in-Chief, Royal Indian Navy; 1946–1947	Succeeded by John Hall
