= Admiral Richmond =

Admiral Richmond may refer to:

- Alfred C. Richmond (1902–1984), U.S. Coast Guard admiral
- Herbert Richmond (1871–1946), British Royal Navy admiral
- Julius B. Richmond (1916–2008), U.S. Public Health Service Commissioned Corps vice admiral
- Maxwell Richmond (1900–1986), New Zealand-born British Royal Navy vice admiral
