= HMS Euphrates =

Four ships and one shore establishment of the Royal Navy have borne the name HMS Euphrates, after the Euphrates river. Another three were planned but never completed:

- HMS Euphrates (1813) was a 36-gun fifth rate built as HMS Greyhound, but renamed in 1812 and launched in 1813. She was sold in 1818.
- HMS Euphrates was to have been a 46-gun fifth rate. She was laid down, but cancelled in 1831.
- HMS Euphrates was to have been a wooden screw frigate, laid down in 1847 and cancelled in 1849.
- HMS Euphrates (1866) was an iron screw troopship launched in 1866 and sold in 1894.
- HMS Euphrates was to have been an Emerald-class light cruiser, laid down in 1918 and cancelled in 1919.
- HMS Euphrates (shore establishment) was a shore establishment from 1942 located at Basra.

== See also ==
- HCS Euphrates (1828), a brig of 255 tons (bm) and 10 guns, was built at the Bombay Dockyard as one of the last vessels built for the EIC's naval arm. She was broken up in 1911.
- PS Euphrates (1836) was a flat-bottomed, iron, paddle steamer built by Laird & Co. in 1834. She was disassembled, shipped in 1835 to the Bay of Antioch, carried overland, and reassembled in 1836 on the Lake of Antioch for the English Euphrates expedition, together with PS Tigris (1836). She was of 179, or 186 tons (bm) and 40HP, and two guns. She completed the descent of the Euphrates in 1836. Later she served in the Indus flotilla until at least 1858. Her subsequent fate is unknown.
- Euphrates (ship)
