= Rear-Admiral, Alexandria =

- Active: 1939–1944
- Country: United Kingdom
- Branch: Royal Navy
- Part of: Mediterranean Fleet (1939–1943) Commander-in-Chief, Levant (1943–1944)
- Garrison/HQ: HMS Nile, Alexandria, Egypt

Commanders
- Notable commanders: Rear-Admiral Allan Poland

The Rear-Admiral, Alexandria was an administrative shore based appointment of the British Royal Navy. The post was established during the Second World War, subordinate to the Commander-in-Chief, Mediterranean Fleet then later the Commander-in-Chief, Levant.

The Navy List for 1940, 1941, and 1943 locates the admiral at Alexandra.

The post of Rear-Admiral, Alexandria was created during the Second World War, responsible for administering the shore establishment of HMS Nile (borne in Maidstone II) at Ras el-Tin Point, Alexandria. The post existed from 1939 to 1945. From November 1939 until February 1943 it was part of the Mediterranean Fleet until the Fleet was divided. After February 1943 the Rear-Admiral Alexandria came under the command of the new Commander-in-Chief, Levant, until January 1944 when the Mediterranean Fleet was reunified once more.

== Incumbent admirals ==
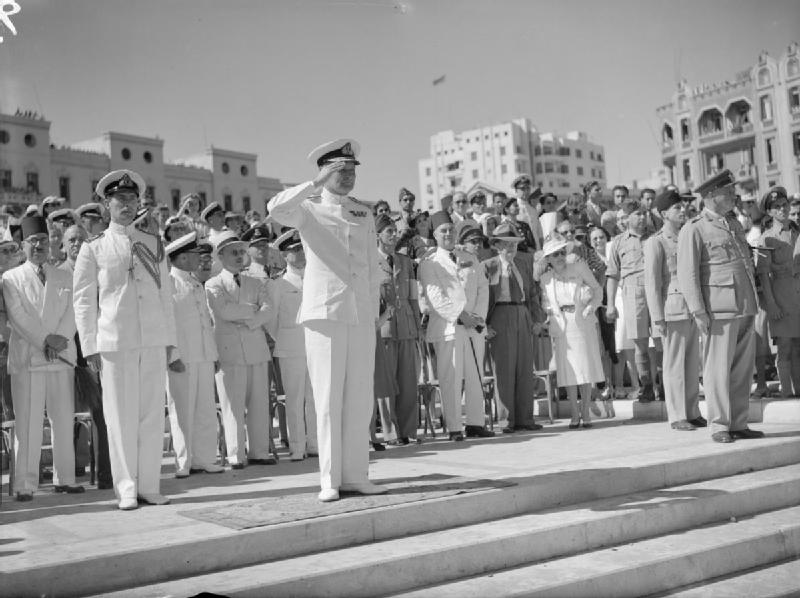
Rear Admiral Poland at a parade in Alexandria

The Rear-Admiral, Alexandria reported to the C-in-C, Mediterranean Fleet from November 1939 to February 1943, and then was resubordinated to the C-in-C, Levant until December 1943. Post holders included:

	Rank	Flag	Name	Term	Notes/Ref
Rear-Admiral, Alexandria
1	Rear Admiral	Rear-Admiral - Royal Navy	F. Elliott	November, 1939 – February, 1941	Also Playfair, Vol. I., Annex 9, p. 478.
2	Rear Admiral	Rear-Admiral - Royal Navy	George H. Creswell	February, 1941 – August, 1942	
3	Rear Admiral	Rear-Admiral - Royal Navy	Allan Poland	November, 1942 – October, 1944	elevated to Acting Vice-Admiral and Knighted

== Headquarters staff ==
Base HQ was HMS Nile, borne in HMS Maidstone II.

=== Chief Staff Officer and Flag Captain, Alexandria ===
	Rank	Flag	Name	Term	Notes/Ref
Chief Staff Officer and Flag Captain, Alexandria
1	Acting-Captain		R.D. Binney	25 January 1940 – 12 January 1941	(retd)
2	Captain		B.C.B. Brooke	12 January 1941 – August 1942	
3	Flag Captain		C.H. Rolleston	16 November 1942 – October 1943	(retd)
4	Captain		D. Young-Jameson	October – December 1943	

=== Captain-Superintendent, Alexandria ===
Post holders included:

	Rank	Flag	Name	Term	Notes/Ref
Captain-Superintendent, Alexandria
1	Captain		W.Y. La R. Beverley	14 August 1940 – April, 1942	
2	Captain		C. Coppinger	April, 1942 – December, 1943	

== Levant Area ==
The Senior Naval Officer, later Commander, Levant Area, was originally styled as Naval Officer-in-Charge, Haifa. His title was later changed to SNO Levant Area and his headquarters transferred to Beirut.

	Rank	Flag	Name	Term	Notes/Ref
Commander, Levant Area
1	Captain		J.A.V. Morse	October 1941 – 1 April 1942	as SNO Levant Area
2	Commodore		D. Young-Jameson	June – December 1943	as COMM, Levant Area

== Cyprus Area ==
=== Naval Officer-in-Charge, Cyprian Ports ===
Post holders included:

	Rank	Flag	Name	Term	Notes/Ref
Naval Officer-in-Charge, Cyprian Ports
1	Captain		M.H.S. Macdonald	18 November 1941 – December, 1943	
