= Black Sea and Caspian Squadron =

- Active: 1918-1919
- Country: United Kingdom
- Allegiance: British Empire
- Branch: Royal Navy
- Part of: Mediterranean Fleet
- Garrison/HQ: HMS Emperor of India
- Engagements: Allied intervention in the Russian Civil War

The Black Sea and Caspian Squadron, also known as the Black Sea and Marmora Force and the Black Sea and Marmora Division, was a naval formation of the British Mediterranean Fleet from 1918 to 1919.

== History ==
On 19 December 1918 the Commander-in-Chief, Mediterranean Fleet instructed Rear-Admiral Michael Culme-Seymour, then commanding British Aegean Squadron, that he was to be re-assigned to a new command appointment. On 1 January he transferred his current command to Commodore Maurice Fitzmaurice and assumed authority for the Black Sea, Caspian Sea, Sea of Azov and Sea of Marmora. The squadron was involved in the Allied intervention in the Russian Civil War. In October 1919 Rear-Admiral Seymour was appointed Second-in-Command, Mediterranean Fleet, and the squadron was disbanded. The squadron's flagship was HMS Emperor of India.

A component of the squadron was the British Caspian Flotilla.

== Rear-Admirals, commanding ==
Post holders included:

Rank	Flag	Name	Term
Rear-Admiral Commanding, Black Sea, Caspian Sea and Sea of Marmora
Rear-Admiral	Rear-Admiral - Royal Navy	Michael Culme-Seymour	1 January – October 1919

== Components ==
As of December 1918 included:

#	units	notes
3	Battleships	
7	Cruisers	
3	Sea Plane Carriers	
7	Monitors	
8	Destroyers	from 5th Destroyer Flotilla
6	Sloops	
1	British Caspian Flotilla	

== Sources ==
- Admiralty, Great Britain (October 1919). "Flag Officers in Commission". Navy List. London England: HM Stationery Office.
- Halpern, Paul (2016). The Mediterranean Fleet, 1919–1929. Cambridge England: Routledge. ISBN 9781317024163.
- Harley, Simon; Lovell, Tony (5 September 2018). "H.M.S. Heliotrope (1915) - The Dreadnought Project". www.dreadnoughtproject.org.
- Watson, Dr Graham (2015). "Royal Navy Organisation and Ship Deployment, Inter-War Years 1914-1918: Mediterranean Fleet". www.naval-history.net. Gordon Smith.
