= Commodore-in-Charge, Algiers =

- Active: 1942 - 1946
- Country: United Kingdom
- Branch: Royal Navy
- Type: Military command
- Part of: Mediterranean Fleet (1942-1943); Levant Command (1943-1944); Mediterranean Fleet (1944-1946)
- Garrison/HQ: HMS Hannibal, Algiers, Algeria (1942-1946)

The Commodore-in-Charge, Algiers was an administrative shore based appointment of the British Royal Navy established during World war II who was responsible for the berthing of all British convoys in Algeria and its sub-commands, facilities and staff from 1942 to 1946. The post holder was based at Allied Force Headquarters, Algiers. It was at first a sub-command of the Commander-in-Chief, Mediterranean Fleet then later the Commander-in-Chief, Levant.

== History ==
The post of Commodore-in-Charge, Algiers was established in December 1942. The office holder was shore based at Allied Forces Headquarters in Algiers. He was chiefly responsible for the berthing of convoys at all Algerian ports and bases and administering the RN establishments in Algeria including its naval base HMS Hannibal. its facilities, installations and staff. In addition he superintended the S.N.O. in Charge at the port of Bône. The S.N.O. Bone was responsible superintending the senior naval officers in charge at Bougie and Phillippeville naval bases. The post holder reported directly to the Commander-in-Chief Mediterranean Fleet until February 1943 when that command was divided between operational and shore commands his reporting line transferred to the Commander-in-Chief, Levant. In January 1944 both commands were reunified under the single Mediterranean Fleet once more. The post holder was active from 1942 to 1944 when his post was abolished his sub-commands were gradually deactivated by 1946 when the shore establishment at Algiers HMS Hannibal was closed.

== Commodore-in-Charge, Algiers ==
	Rank	Flag	Name	Term	Notes/Ref
Commodore, Algeria
1	Commodore		John A.V. Morse	25 December 1942 – 28 August 1943	
2	Commodore		Fitzroy.E.P. Hutton	28 August – April, 1944	later Rear-Admiral

=== Sub-commands ===
==== Naval Officer-in-Charge, Bone ====
The Naval Officer-in-Charge, Bone was an administrative shore based appointment who was responsible superintending HMS Cannae including its facilities and staff from January to August 1943.

	Rank	Flag	Name	Term	Notes/Ref
Naval Officer-in-Charge, Bone & Commanding Officer, HMS Cannae (RN Base, Bone)
1	Captain		N.V. Dickinson	11 January – June, 1943	
2	Commander		R.I. Money	June – August, 1943	

===== Naval Officer-in-Charge, Bougie =====
The Naval Officer-in-Charge, Bougie was a shore based command appointment the post who was responsible superintending HMS Byrsa at Bougie, Algeria including its facilities and staff from January to December 1943 he then transferred to HMS Cannae from August to December 1943 to .

	Rank	Flag	Name	Term	Notes/Ref
Naval Officer-in-Charge, Bougie & Commanding Officer, HMS Byrsa (RN Base, Bougie)
1	Acting-Commander		P.E. Vaux	January – July, 1943	
2	Commander		F. Metherell	June – August, 1943	

===== Naval Officer-in-Charge, Phillippeville =====
The Naval Officer-in-Charge, Phillippeville was an administrative shore based command appointment of British Royal Navy who was initially responsible superintending HMS Elissa at Phillippeville, Algeria including its facilities and staff from January to August 1943 he then transferred to HMS Cannae from August to December 1943.

	Rank	Flag	Name	Term	Notes/Ref
Naval Officer-in-Charge, Bone & Commanding Officer, HMS Elissa (RN Base, Phillippeville)
1	Acting-Commander		N.V. Dickinson	January – August, 1943	
2	Commander		R.I. Money	August – October, 1943	
2	Commander		R.I. Money	October – December, 1943	

== Sources ==
- Houterman, Jerome N..; Koppes, Jeroen (2004–2006). "Royal Navy, Mediterranean Fleet 1939-1945". www.unithistories.com. Houterman and Koppes.
- Imperial War Museums. London, England
- "Naval Shore Establishments". National Museum of the Royal Navy. Greenwich, London, England: National Maritime Museum.
