= Israel Harding =

Recipient of the Victoria Cross

- Born: 21 October 1833; Portsmouth, England
- Died: 22 May 1917 (aged 83); Billingshurst, West Sussex, England
- Burial place: Highland Road Cemetery, Portsmouth
- Military career
- Allegiance: United Kingdom
- Branch: Royal Navy
- Rank: Chief Gunner
- Units: HMS Arrogant; HMS Barracouta; HMS Alexandra
- Conflicts: Crimean War; 1882 Anglo-Egyptian War; Third Anglo-Ashanti War
- Awards: Victoria Cross; Mentioned in dispatches

Israel Harding, VC (21 October 1833 – 22 May 1917) was a sailor in the Royal Navy and a recipient of the Victoria Cross, the highest award for gallantry in the face of the enemy that can be awarded to British and Commonwealth forces.

== Naval career ==
Harding was 48 years old, and a gunner in the Royal Navy during the 1882 Anglo-Egyptian War when the following deed took place for which he was awarded the Victoria Cross (VC).

On 11 July 1882 at Alexandria, Egypt, HMS Alexandra, with other ships, was bombarding the forts of the city and suffering damage and casualties from the enemy's guns. During the engagement a 10-inch shell passed through the ship's side and lodged on the main deck. Gunner Harding, hearing a shout that there was a live shell just above the hatchway (which led to the magazine) rushed up from below, picked it up and flung it into a tub of water. Had the shell burst it would probably have caused many deaths.

On return to England the Victoria Cross was presented to him by Edward, Prince of Wales.

Harding later achieved the rank of chief gunner. His VC is on display in the Lord Ashcroft Gallery at the Imperial War Museum in London.

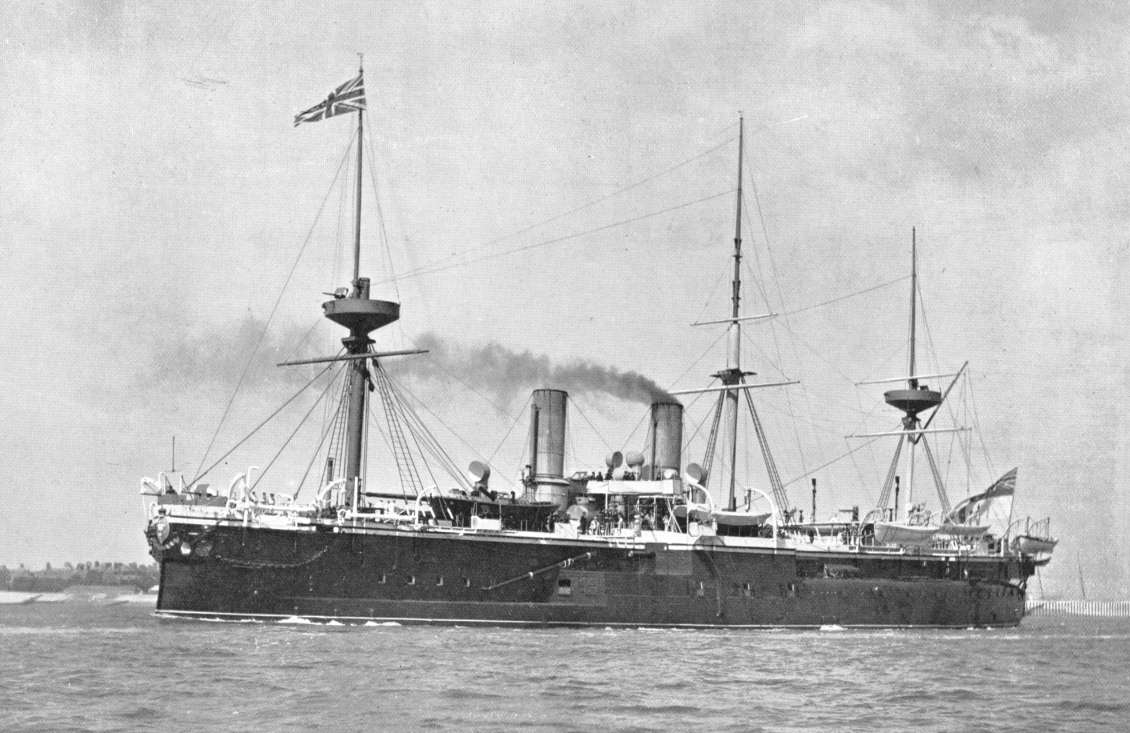
HMS Alexandra

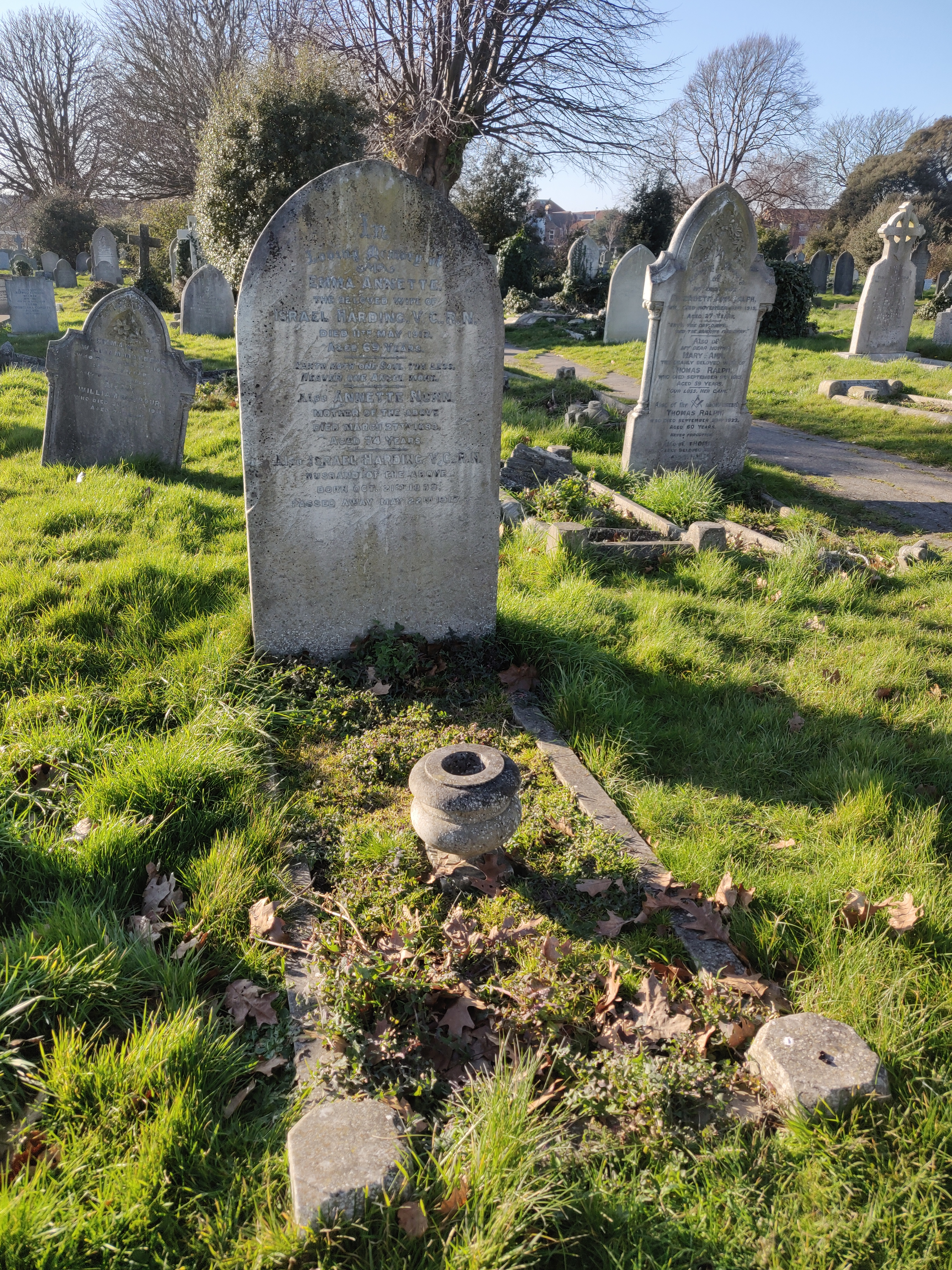
Grave of Israel Harding V.C.
