= Euphrates (ship) =

Several ships have been named Euphrates for the Euphrates River:

- Euphrates (1803 EIC ship) was launched as an East Indiaman. Between 1803 and 1812 she made four voyages to India for the British East India Company (EIC). During these voyages she participated as a transport in two military campaigns, the capture of the Cape of Good Hope and of Mauritius. She was wrecked in 1813 towards the end of the outward leg of a fifth voyage to India.
- Euphrates (1820 ship), of 557 tons (bm), was built at Scarborough. She was wrecked c.1865.
- HCS Euphrates (1828), a brig of 255 tons (bm) and 10 guns, was built at the Bombay Dockyard as one of the last vessels built for the EIC's naval arm. She was broken up in 1911.
- PS Euphrates (1836) was a flat-bottomed, iron, paddle steamer built by Laird & Co. in 1834. She was disassembled, shipped in 1835 to the Bay of Antioch, carried overland, and reassembled in 1836 on the Lake of Antioch for the English Euphrates expedition, together with PS Tigris (1836). She was of 179, or 186 tons (bm) and 40HP, and two guns. She completed the descent of the Euphrates in 1836. Later she served in the Indus flotilla until at least 1858. Her subsequent fate is unknown.

== See also ==
- HMS Euphrates, any one of several vessels or shore establishments of the British Royal Navy
