= Sir Michael Culme-Seymour, 4th Baronet =

Royal Navy officer (1867–1925)

Vice-Admiral Sir Michael Culme-Seymour Bt KCB MVO
- Born: 29 August 1867
- Died: 2 April 1925 (aged 57)
- Spouse: Florence Nugent (m. 1896)
- Children: 2
- Parents: Sir Michael Culme-Seymour, 3rd Baronet (father); Mary Georgiana Watson (mother)
- Military career
- Allegiance: United Kingdom
- Branch: Royal Navy
- Service years: 1881–1925
- Rank: Vice-Admiral
- Commands: Second Sea Lord (1924–25); North America and West Indies Station (1923–24); 4th Battle Squadron (1919); HMS Centurion (1913–16); HMS Invincible (1912–13); HMS Argyll (1910–12); HMS Coquette (1900–03)
- Conflicts: First World War; Battle of Jutland
- Awards: Knight Commander of the Order of the Bath; Member of the Royal Victorian Order; Mentioned in Despatches; Order of Saint Stanislaus (Russia); Order of St. Vladimir (Russia); Order of the Rising Sun (Japan); Légion d'honneur (France); Grand Commander of the Order of the Redeemer (Greece); Mentioned in Despatches

Vice-Admiral Sir Michael Culme-Seymour, 4th Baronet, KCB, MVO (29 August 1867 – 2 April 1925) was an officer of the Royal Navy. A member of a substantial naval dynasty, he served during the First World War, commanding a ship at the Battle of Jutland in 1916. He received a number of awards and decorations, and served as commander-in-chief of the Mediterranean Fleet during the interwar period, and as Second Sea Lord. He inherited a baronetcy on the death of his father, but died shortly afterwards with the rank of vice-admiral.

== Naval career ==
Culme-Seymour was born on 29 August 1867, eldest son of Captain Michael Culme-Seymour and Mary Georgiana Watson. He followed his father by embarking on a naval career, and was promoted to the rank of lieutenant on 23 August 1889. He was appointed in command of the destroyer HMS Coquette on 31 August 1900.

By the outbreak of the First World War he had risen to the rank of captain, and he commanded the battleship HMS Centurion as part of the 2nd Battle Squadron of the Grand Fleet, and fought at the Battle of Jutland in 1916. He was Mentioned in Despatches for his efforts, and was promoted to flag-rank later that year, becoming rear-admiral.

Culme-Seymour spent the period between 1916 and 1918 as Director of the Mobilisation Division (renamed the Mobilisation Department in 1918) at the Admiralty.

With the end of the war Culme-Seymour between 1 January 1919 and 1 September 1920 he simultaneously was appointed and held the posts of Rear-Admiral Commanding, 4th Battle Squadron. The same month he was Rear-Admiral Commanding the Black Sea and Caspian Squadron that was a detachment of the 4th Battle Squadron. He was appointed Commander-in-Chief, Eastern Mediterranean Squadron (May–September 1919), with promotion to vice-admiral on 7 October 1920. In 1920 he was appointed Second-in-Command, Mediterranean Fleet. The death of his father that year led to his succession as 4th Baronet Seymour, of High Mount. He then became Commander-in-Chief of the North America and West Indies Station, with his shore headquarters at Admiralty House in the Imperial fortress colony of Bermuda, between 1923 and 1924, after which he became Second Sea Lord. He died on 2 April 1925.

== Honours ==
Culme-Seymour was appointed a Member, 4th class (MVO) of the Royal Victorian Order in 1912, at which point he was commanding HMS Argyll. He was appointed a Commander of the Order of the Bath (CB) in 1916 for his service at the Battle of Jutland, and promoted to Knight Commander of that Order (KCB) in the 1920 Birthday Honours.

For his service during the war he received a number of foreign honours. He was made a member of the Russian Orders of Saint Stanislaus (1st Class) and the Order of St. Vladimir (4th Class with swords), the Japanese Order of the Rising Sun (2nd Class), the French Légion d'honneur and a Grand Commander of the Greek Order of the Redeemer.

== Family ==
He had married Florence Nugent in 1896, and was survived by his wife and their son and daughter. The son, Michael, inherited the baronetcy and went on to serve in the navy before (including aboard HMS Danae on the America and West Indies Station, as the North America and West Indies Station had been renamed in 1928) and during the Second World War.

Military offices
Preceded by Sir William Pakenham	Commander-in-Chief, North America and West Indies Station; 1923–1924	Succeeded by James Fergusson
Preceded by Sir Henry Oliver	Second Sea Lord; 1924–1925	Succeeded by Sir Hubert Brand
Baronetage of the United Kingdom
Preceded by Michael Culme-Seymour	Baronet (of Highmount and Friery Park); 1920–1925	Succeeded by Michael Culme-Seymour
