= Mediterranean Fleet =

Formation of the Royal Navy, active from 1654 to 1967

- The battleships Bulwark, Renown and Ramillies at Malta in 1902
- Active: September 1654 – 5 June 1967
- Country: United Kingdom
- Branch: (United Kingdom) Royal Navy
- Type: Fleet
- Garrison/HQ: Admiralty House, Malta

Commanders
- Notable commanders: Samuel Hood, Horatio Nelson, Andrew Cunningham

The British Mediterranean Fleet, also known as the Mediterranean Station, was a formation of the Royal Navy. The Fleet was one of the most prestigious commands in the navy for the majority of its history, defending the vital sea link between the United Kingdom and India. General at Sea Robert Blake was appointed as the first commander in September 1654. The Fleet was in existence until 1967.

The fleet's shore headquarters was initially based at Port Mahon Dockyard, Minorca for most of the eighteenth century. It rotated between Gibraltar and Malta from 1791 to 1812. From 1813 to July 1939 it was permanently at Malta Dockyard. In August 1939 the C-in-C Mediterranean Fleet moved his flag afloat on board HMS Warspite until April 1940. He was then back onshore at Malta until February 1941. He transferred it again to HMS Warspite until July 1942. In August 1942 headquarters were moved to Alexandria where they remained until February 1943. HQ was changed again but this time in rotation between Algiers and Taranto until June 1944. It then moved back to Malta until it was abolished in 1967.

== From the 1700s ==
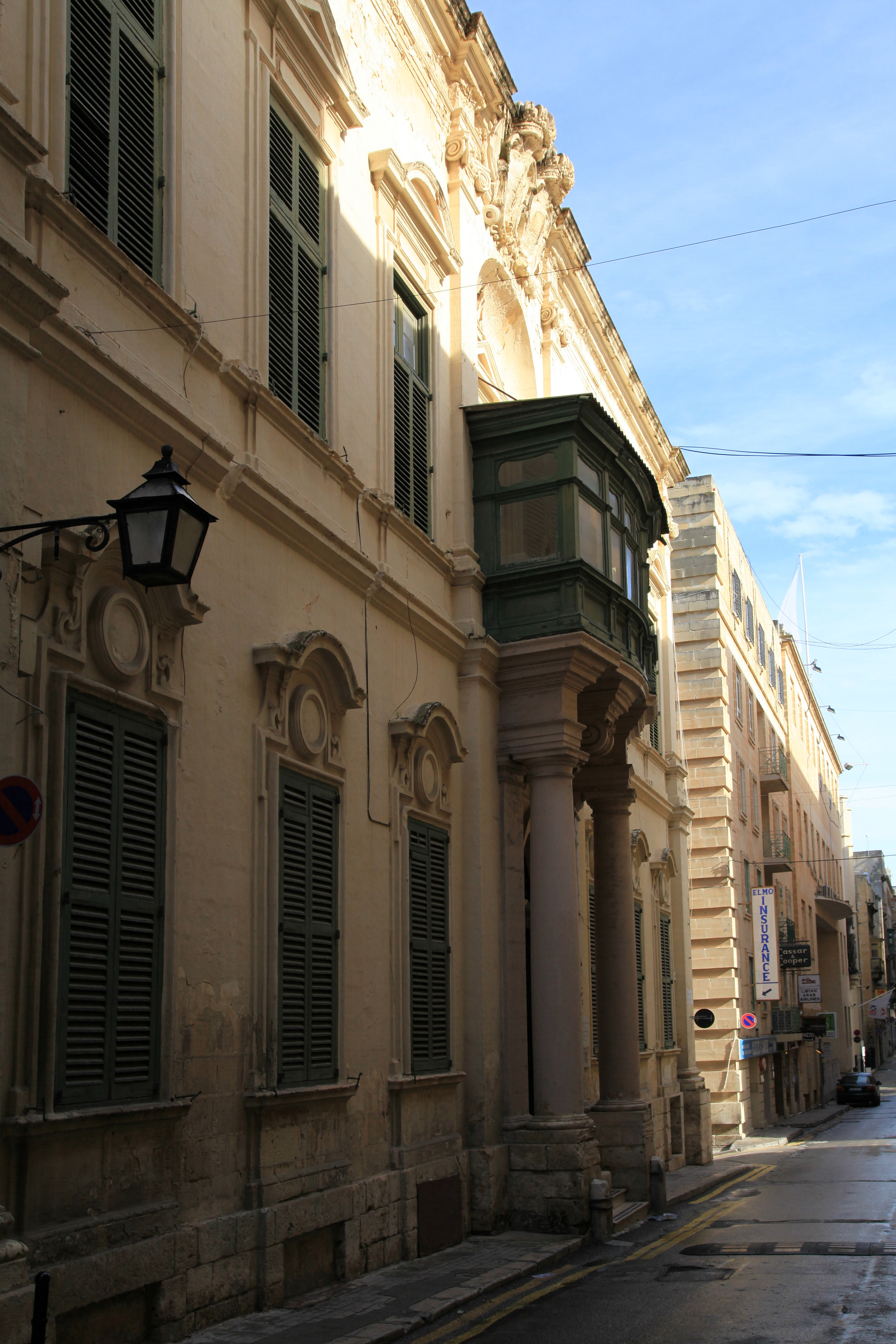
Admiralty House in Valletta, the Commander-in-Chief, Mediterranean Fleet's official residence from 1821 to 1961

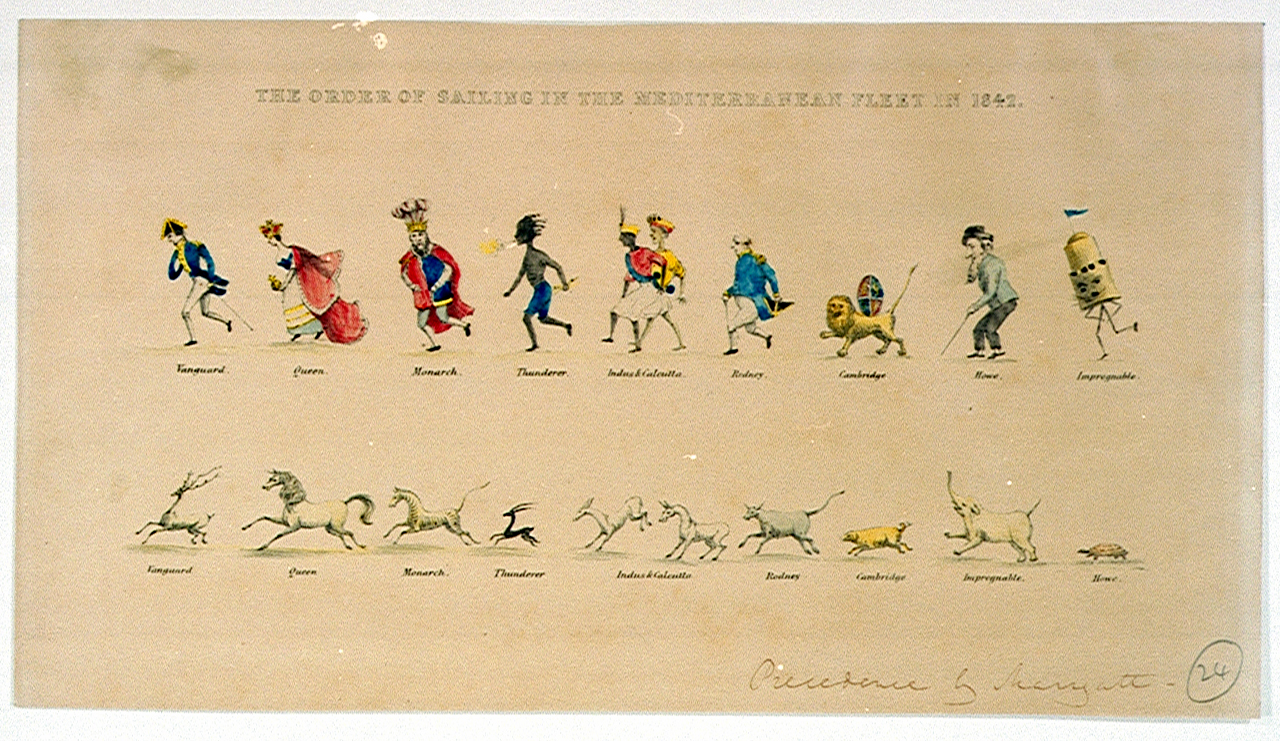
1842 illustration of the Mediterranean Fleet's order of sailing

The Royal Navy gained a foothold in the Mediterranean when Gibraltar was captured from Spain by Anglo-Dutch forces in August 1704 during the War of Spanish Succession and formally ceded to Britain in the 1713 Peace of Utrecht. Though the British had maintained a naval presence in the Mediterranean before, the capture of Gibraltar allowed the British to establish their first naval base there. The British also used Port Mahon, on the island of Menorca, as a naval base. However, British control there was only temporary; Menorca changed hands numerous times, and was permanently ceded to Spain in 1802 under the Treaty of Amiens.

In 1800, the British took Malta, which was to be handed over to the Knights of Malta under the Treaty of Amiens. When the Napoleonic Wars resumed in 1803, the British kept Malta for use as a naval base. The first Resident Commissioner of the Malta Dockyard, a serving RN captain, was appointed soon afterwards. Following Napoleon's defeat, the British continued their presence in Malta, and turned it into the main base for the Mediterranean Fleet. The commissioner of the dockyard was upgraded to a Rear-Admiral's position as Admiral Superintendent Malta in 1832. Between the 1860s and 1900s, the British undertook a number of projects to improve the harbours and dockyard facilities, and Malta's harbours were sufficient to allow the entire fleet to be safely moored there.

In 1884–85, Commodore Robert More-Molyneux commanded the ships in the Red Sea, seemingly the Red Sea Division, during the Mahdist War. He protected Suakin till the arrival of Sir Gerald Graham's expedition in 1885.

In the last decade of the nineteenth century, the Mediterranean Fleet was the largest single force in the Royal Navy, with ten first-class battleships—double the number in the Channel Fleet—and a large number of smaller warships. On 22 June 1893, the bulk of the fleet, eight battleships and three large cruisers, were conducting their annual summer exercises off Tripoli, Lebanon, when the fleet's flagship, the battleship HMS Victoria, collided with the battleship HMS Camperdown. Victoria sank within fifteen minutes, taking 358 crew with her. Vice-Admiral Sir George Tryon, commander of the Mediterranean Fleet, was among the dead.

In September 1910, the 6th Cruiser Squadron was attached to the Mediterranean Fleet, until a large fleet reorganisation in 1912. From May 1912, the 1st Cruiser Squadron operated in the Mediterranean.

Two Invincible-class battlecruisers, (Inflexible and Indomitable) joined the Mediterranean Fleet in 1914. They and Indefatigable formed the nucleus of the fleet at the start of the First World War when British forces pursued the German ships Goeben and Breslau.

During World War I responsibility for various areas in the Mediterranean was split between the Allies, operating under a French commander-in-chief, Admiral Augustin Boué de Lapeyrère. The British were responsible for Gibraltar, Malta, Egyptian coast, and the Aegean. Vice-Admiral Somerset Gough-Calthorpe was also responsible for coordinating other allied forces in Mediterranean. British forces were divided into the Gibraltar and Malta forces, the British Adriatic Squadron, the British Aegean Squadron, the Egypt Division and Red Sea and the Black Sea and Marmora Force.

In 1915 the Allies sent a substantial invasion force of British, Indian, Australian, New Zealand, French and Newfoundland troops to attempt to open up the straits. In the Gallipoli campaign, Ottoman troops trapped the Allies on the coasts of the Gallipoli peninsula. The Ottomans mined the straits to prevent Allied ships from penetrating them but, in minor actions two submarines, one British and one Australian, did succeed in penetrating the minefields. The British submarine HMS E11 sank the Ottoman pre-dreadnought battleship Barbaros Hayreddin off the Golden Horn on 8 August 1915. Sir Ian Hamilton's Mediterranean Expeditionary Force failed in its attempt to capture the Gallipoli peninsula, and the British cabinet ordered its withdrawal in December 1915, after eight months' fighting. Total deaths included 41,000 British and Irish, 15,000 French, and over 11,000 others, in comparison to over 86,000 Turkish.

After the beginning of the Dardanelles campaign, the Eastern Mediterranean Squadron later known as the British Aegean Squadron was based at Mudros. It then alternated between Mudros on the island of Lemnos and Salonika from 1917 until it was dispersed in 1919. Thereafter there was a commodore stationed at Smyrna in 1919 to 1920.

In August 1917 Vice-Admiral Somerset Gough-Calthorpe became Commander-in-Chief, commanding all British naval forces in the Mediterranean.

A recently modernised Warspite became the flagship of the Commander-in-Chief and Second-in-Command, Mediterranean Fleet in 1926.

== Second World War ==
Malta, a part of the British Empire from 1814, was the headquarters for the Mediterranean Fleet until the mid-1930s. Due to the perceived threat of air-attack from the Italian mainland, the fleet was moved to Alexandria, Egypt, shortly before the outbreak of the Second World War. From January 1937, the Flag Officer, Malta was a vice-admiral's position, the first being Vice-Admiral Sir Wilbraham Ford.

Sir Andrew Cunningham took command of the fleet from Warspite on 3 September 1939, and under him the major formations of the Fleet were the 1st Battle Squadron under Vice-Admiral Geoffrey Layton (Warspite, Barham, and Malaya) 1st Cruiser Squadron (Devonshire, Shropshire, and Sussex), 3rd Cruiser Squadron (Arethusa, Penelope, Galatea), Rear Admiral John Tovey, with the 1st, 2nd, 3rd and 4th Destroyer Flotillas, and the aircraft carrier Glorious.

In 1940, the Mediterranean Fleet carried out a successful aircraft carrier attack on the Italian Fleet at Taranto by air. Other major actions included the Battle of Cape Matapan and the Battle of Crete. The Fleet had to block Italian and later German reinforcements and supplies for the North African Campaign.

The Flag Officer, Red Sea and his forces became part of the fleet in October 1941, but became part of the Eastern Fleet in May 1942.

After the Axis had been driven out of Africa, the next major offensive was to be the Allied invasion of Sicily. Stephen Roskill, in The War at Sea writes:

This required early revision of the Mediterranean naval command areas. ..Admiral Cunningham.. would remain in supreme command of the maritime side of the next Allied assault. It was therefore logical that his authority should be extended to include the bases from which the expedition would be launched, and all the waters across which it would pass. Accordingly on the 20th of February Cunningham relinquished his title of Naval Commander, Expeditionary Force, and resumed his former, and perhaps more famous position as Commander-in-Chief, Mediterranean. His jurisdiction now extended not only over the whole of the western basin, but over the greater part of the former North Atlantic Command. Admiral Harwood became Commander-in-Chief, Levant instead of Mediterranean, and the boundary between Cunningham's and Harwood's commands was shifted further east. It now ran from the Tunis-Tripoli frontier to 35° North 16° East, and thence to Cape Spartivento on the 'toe' of Italy.3 Admiral Cunningham thus became responsible for the whole Tunisian coast, in whose ports part of the expedition against Sicily was to be prepared and trained, for the key position of Malta and for the waters around Sicily itself. All the naval forces based on Malta, including the famous 10th Submarine Flotilla and the hard hitting surface striking forces, came under him once more; and he was also given powers to arrange the distribution of naval forces between the Levant and Mediterranean commands to suit his requirements.

== Post war ==
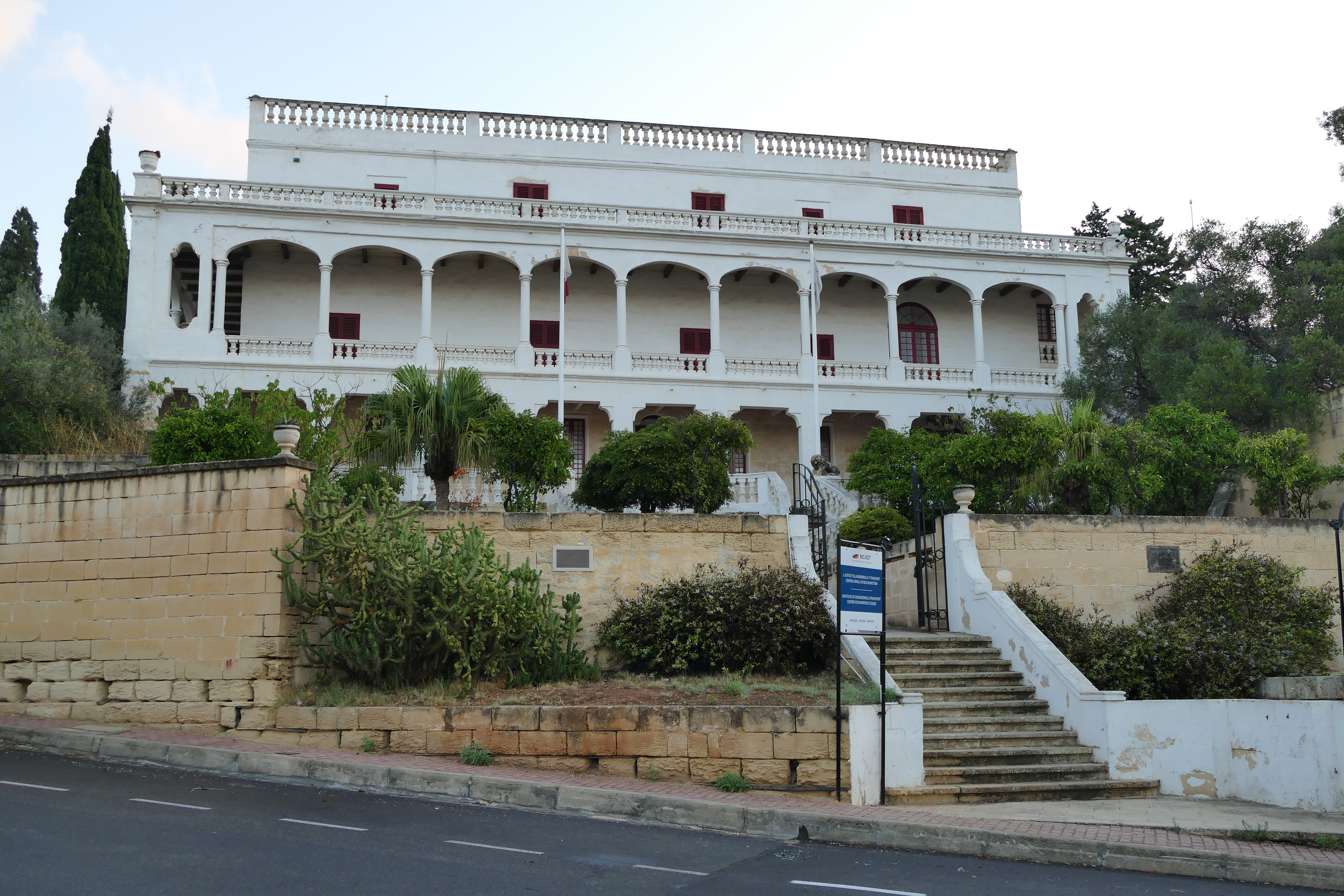
Villa Portelli, official residence of the Commander-in-Chief from 1961 to 1967 (and then of Flag Officer Malta from 1967 until 1979)

In 1946 the flag officer's position in Malta was downgraded to a rear admiral once more. In October 1946, Saumarez hit a mine in the Corfu Channel, starting a series of events known as the Corfu Channel Incident. The channel was cleared in "Operation Recoil" the next month, involving 11 minesweepers under the guidance of Ocean, two cruisers, three destroyers, and three frigates.

In May 1948, Sir Arthur Power took over as Commander-in-Chief Mediterranean, and in his first act arranged a show of force to discourage the crossing of Jewish refugees into Palestine. When later that year Britain pulled out of the British Mandate of Palestine, Ocean, four destroyers, and two frigates escorted the departing High Commissioner, aboard the cruiser Euryalus. The force stayed to cover the evacuation of British troops into the Haifa enclave and south via Gaza.

From 1952 to 1967, the post of Commander in Chief Mediterranean Fleet was given a dual-hatted role as NATO Commander in Chief of Allied Forces Mediterranean in charge of all forces assigned to NATO in the Mediterranean Area. The British made strong representations within NATO in discussions regarding the development of the Mediterranean NATO command structure, wishing to retain their direction of NATO naval command in the Mediterranean to protect their sea lines of communication running through the Mediterranean to the Middle East and Far East. When a NATO naval commander, Admiral Robert B. Carney, C-in-C Allied Forces Southern Europe, was appointed, relations with the incumbent British C-in-C, Admiral Sir John Edelsten, were frosty. Edlesten, on making an apparently friendly offer of the use of communications facilities to Carney, who initially lacked secure communications facilities, was met with "I'm not about to play Faust to your Mephistopheles through the medium of communications!"

In 1956, ships of the fleet, together with the French Navy, took part in the Suez War against Egypt.

From 1957 to 1959, Rear Admiral Charles Madden held the post of Flag Officer, Malta, with responsibilities for three squadrons of minesweepers, an amphibious warfare squadron, and a flotilla of submarines stationed at the bases around Valletta Harbour. In this capacity, he had to employ considerable diplomatic skill to maintain good relations with Dom Mintoff, the nationalistic prime minister of Malta.

In the 1960s, as the importance of maintaining the link between the United Kingdom and British territories and commitments East of Suez decreased as the Empire was dismantled, and the focus of Cold War naval responsibilities moved to the North Atlantic, the Mediterranean Fleet was gradually drawn down, finally disbanding in June 1967. Eric Grove, in Vanguard to Trident, details how by the mid-1960s the permanent strength of the Fleet was "reduced to a single small escort squadron [appears to have been 30th Escort Squadron with HMS Brighton, HMS Cassandra, HMS Aisne plus another ship] and a coastal minesweeper squadron." Deployments to the Beira Patrol and elsewhere reduced the escort total in 1966 from four to two ships, and then to no frigates at all. The Fleet's assets and area of responsibility were absorbed into the new Western Fleet. As a result of this change, the UK relinquished the NATO post of Commander in Chief, Allied Forces Mediterranean, which was abolished.

== Commanders-in-Chief, Mediterranean ==
The first Commander-in-Chief for the Mediterranean Fleet may have been named as early as 1665.

Commander-in-chief	From	To	Flagship	Note
General at Sea Robert Blake	September 1654	August 1657	Swiftsure; Naseby; George	Styled as Commander of the Fleet for the Mediterranean and Commander of the Mediterranean Fleet. Died on board George.
Admiral Sir Thomas Allin	August 1668	September 1670	Monmouth; Resolution	
Vice-Admiral Sir Edward Spragge	September 1670	March 1672	Revenge; Rupert	
Admiral Sir John Narborough	October 1674	April 1679	Henrietta; Plymouth	
Admiral Arthur Herbert	April 1679	June 1683	Rupert; Bristol; Tiger	
Admiral George Legge, 1st Baron Dartmouth	August 1683	February 1684	Captain	
Captain Cloudesley Shovell	February 1684	1686	James Galley	
Vice-Admiral Henry Killigrew	July 1686	June 1690	Dragon	
Rear-Admiral Sir Francis Wheler	November 1693	February 1694	Sussex	Killed in a shipwreck in Gibraltar Bay
Admiral of the Fleet Edward Russell	June 1694	August 1695		
Admiral Sir George Rooke	August 1695	April 1696	Queen	
Vice-Admiral John Nevell	October 1696	August 1697	Cambridge	Died on board Cambridge.
Vice-Admiral Matthew Aylmer	September 1698	November 1699	Boyne	
Admiral Sir Cloudesley Shovell	March 1703	September 1703	Triumph	
Admiral of the Fleet Sir George Rooke	February 1704	September 1704	Royal Katharine	
Vice-Admiral Sir John Leake	September 1704	May 1705	Prince George	
Admiral Charles Mordaunt, 3rd Earl of Peterborough	May 1705	March 1707		Joint admiral with Sir Cloudesley Shovell.
Admiral of the Fleet Sir Cloudesley Shovell	May 1705	October 1707		Joint admiral with Lord Peterborough. Killed in the Scilly naval disaster of 1707.
Rear-Admiral Sir Thomas Dilkes	October 1707	December 1707		Died of a chill at Livorno.
Admiral Sir John Leake	January 1708	September 1708	Albemarle	
Admiral George Byng	December 1708	Autumn 1709		Styled as Commander-in-Chief, Mediterranean Squadron.
Admiral Sir John Norris	December 1709	November 1710		
Admiral Sir John Jennings	November 1710	December 1713	Blenheim	
Admiral Admiral Sir James Wishart	December 1713	1715	Rippon	
Vice-Admiral John Baker	May 1715	October 1716	Lion	
Vice-Admiral Charles Cornwall	October 1716	March 1718		
Admiral of the Fleet George Byng	March 1718	October 1720	Barfleur	Styled as Commander of the British Mediterranean Fleet.
Vice-Admiral Sir Charles Wager	January 1727	April 1728		
Admiral Sir Charles Wager	August 1731	December 1731	Namur	
Commodore George Clinton	1736	1738		
Vice-Admiral Nicholas Haddock	May 1738	February 1742		
Rear-Admiral Richard Lestock	February 1742	March 1742	Neptune	
Admiral Thomas Mathews	March 1742	June 1744		
Vice-Admiral William Rowley	August 1744	July 1745	Neptune	"Succeeded to the chief command of the Mediterranean Fleet," 1744 (ODNB).
Vice-Admiral Henry Medley	July 1745	August 1747	Russell	Died of fever at Vado.
Vice-Admiral John Byng	August 1747	August 1748	Princess	
Rear-Admiral John Forbes	August 1748	October 1748		As Commander-in-Chief in the Mediterranean.
Commodore Augustus Keppel	March 1749	July 1751	Centurion	
Commodore George Edgcumbe	1751	April 1756	Monmouth; Deptford	
Admiral John Byng	April 1756	July 1756		
Vice-Admiral Sir Edward Hawke	July 1756	January 1757	Ramillies	
Rear-Admiral Charles Saunders	January 1757	May 1757		

=== Commander-in-Chief, Mediterranean Fleet ===
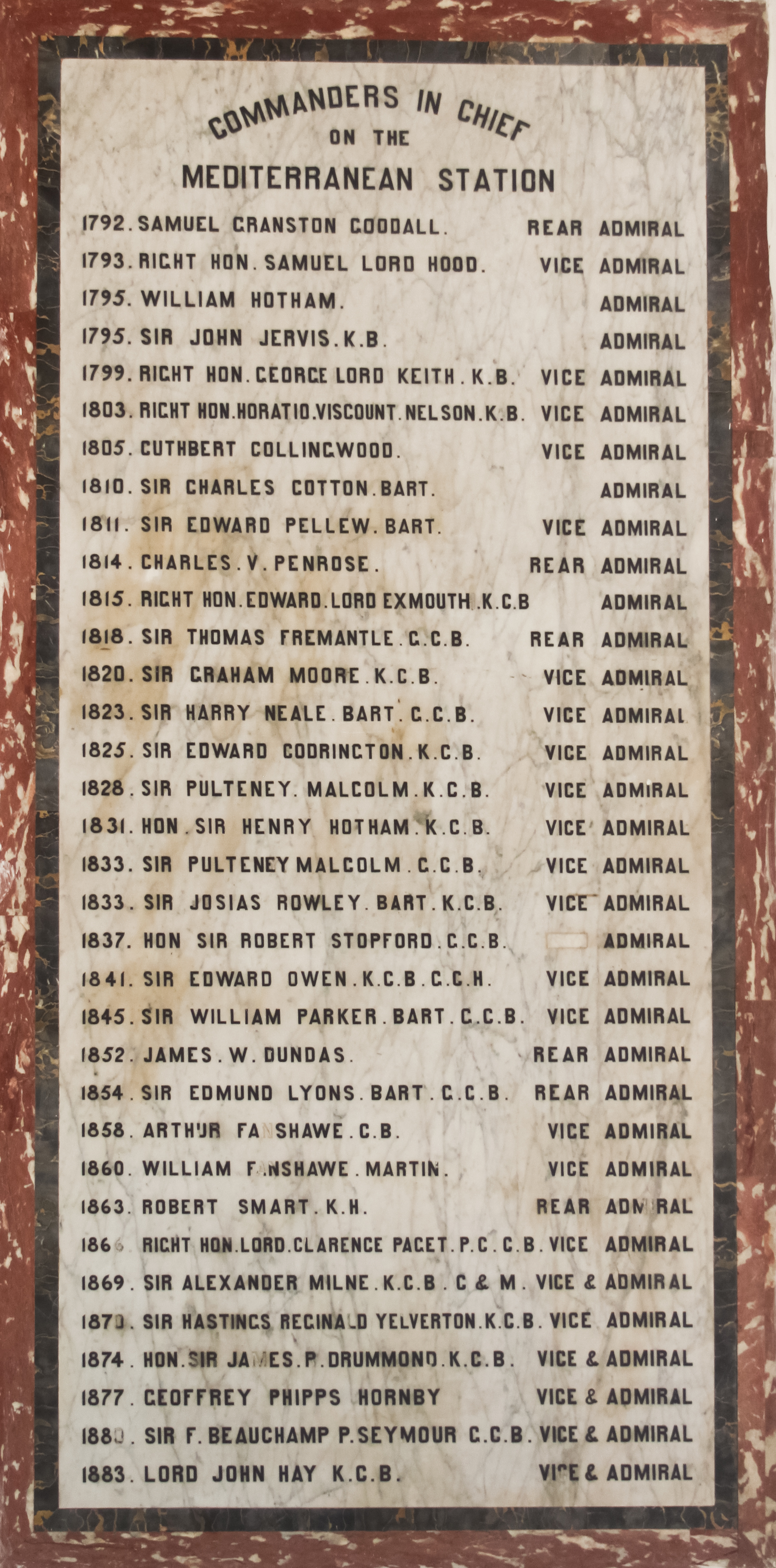
Commanders-in-chief on the Mediterranean Station 1792–1883

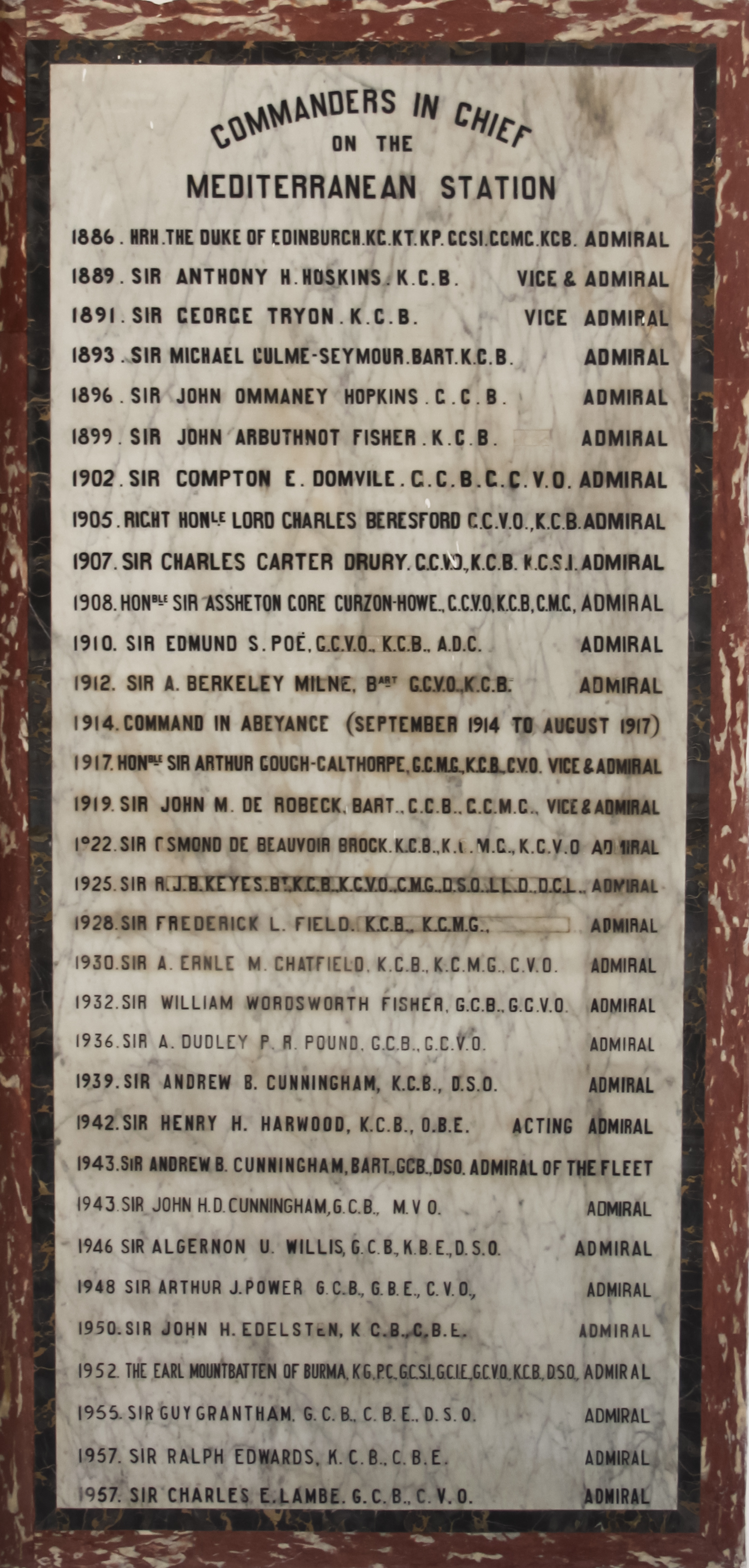
Commanders-in-chief on the Mediterranean Station, 1886–1957

Commanders-in-chief have included:

Commander-in-chief	From	To	Flagship	Note
Admiral Henry Osborn	May 1757	March 1758		
Vice-Admiral Sir Charles Saunders	April 1760	April 1763		
Commodore Richard Spry	May 1766	November 1769		
Rear-Admiral Richard Howe	November 1770	June 1774		
Vice-Admiral Robert Man	June 1774	September 1777		
Vice-Admiral Robert Duff	September 1777	January 1780	Panther	
Commodore John Elliot	January 1780	February 1780	Edgar	
No fleet present	February 1780	December 1783		
Commodore Sir John Lindsay	December 1783	July 1785	Trusty	
Commodore Phillips Cosby	July 1785	January 1789	Trusty	
Rear-Admiral Joseph Peyton	1789	1792		
Rear-Admiral Samuel Granston Goodall	1792	1793		
Vice-Admiral Sir Samuel Hood	February 1793	October 1794		
Vice-Admiral William Hotham, 1st Baron Hotham	October 1794	November 1795		
Vice-Admiral Sir John Jervis	1796	1799		
Vice-Admiral George Elphinstone, 1st Baron Keith	November 1799	1802		
Rear-Admiral Sir Richard Bickerton, 2nd Baronet	1802	1803		
Vice-Admiral Horatio Nelson, 1st Viscount Nelson	May 1803	October 1805	Victory	Killed at Battle of Trafalgar
Vice-Admiral Cuthbert Collingwood, 1st Baron Collingwood	1805	1810		
Vice-Admiral Sir Charles Cotton, 5th Baronet	1810	1811		
Vice-Admiral Sir Edward Pellew, 1st Baronet	1811	1814		
Vice-Admiral Sir Charles Penrose	1814	1815		
Vice-Admiral Edward Pellew, 1st Baron Exmouth	1815	1816		
Vice-Admiral Sir Charles Penrose	1816	1818		
Vice-Admiral Sir Thomas Fremantle	1818	1820		
Vice-Admiral Sir Graham Moore	1820	1823		
Vice-Admiral Sir Harry Burrard-Neale, 2nd Baronet	1823	1826		
Vice-Admiral Sir Edward Codrington	1826	1828		
Vice-Admiral Sir Pulteney Malcolm	1828	1831		
Vice-Admiral Sir Henry Hotham	30 March 1831	19 April 1833		Died 19 April 1833
Vice-Admiral Sir Pulteney Malcolm	3 May 1833	18 December 1833		
Vice-Admiral Sir Josias Rowley, 1st Baronet	18 December 1833	9 February 1837		
Admiral Sir Robert Stopford	9 February 1837	14 October 1841		
Rear-Admiral Sir Francis Mason	31 October 1841	April 1842		
Vice-Admiral Sir Edward Owen	April 1842	27 February 1845		
Vice-Admiral Sir William Parker, 1st Baronet, of Shenstone	27 February 1845	13 July 1846		Parker was briefly First Naval Lord in July 1846 but requested permission to return to the Mediterranean on ground of his health.
Vice-Admiral Sir William Parker	24 July 1846	17 January 1852		
Rear-Admiral Sir James Dundas	17 January 1852	1854		Vice-Adm. 17 December 1852
Rear-Admiral Sir Edmund Lyons	1854	22 February 1858		Vice-Adm. 19 March 1857
Vice-Admiral Sir Arthur Fanshawe	22 February 1858	19 April 1860	Marlborough	
Vice-Admiral Sir William Martin	19 April 1860	20 April 1863	Marlborough	
Vice-Admiral Sir Robert Smart	20 April 1863	28 April 1866	Marlborough then Victoria	
Vice-Admiral Lord Clarence Paget	28 April 1866	28 April 1869	Victoria then Caledonia	
Vice-Admiral Sir Alexander Milne	28 April 1869	25 October 1870	Lord Warden	Adm. 1 April 1870
Vice-Admiral Sir Hastings Yelverton	25 October 1870	13 January 1874	Lord Warden	
Vice-Admiral Sir James Drummond	13 January 1874	15 January 1877	Lord Warden then Hercules	
Vice-Admiral Sir Geoffrey Hornby	5 January 1877	5 February 1880	Alexandra	Adm. 15 June 1879
Vice-Admiral Sir Beauchamp Seymour	5 February 1880	7 February 1883	Inconstant and Alexandra	Adm. 6 May 1882
Vice-Admiral Lord John Hay	7 February 1883	5 February 1886	Alexandra	Adm. 8 July 1884
Vice-Admiral Prince Alfred, Duke of Edinburgh	5 February 1886	11 March 1889	Alexandra	Adm. 18 October 1887
Vice-Admiral Sir Anthony Hoskins	11 March 1889	20 August 1891	Alexandra Mar 89 – Dec 89; Camperdown Dec 89 – May 90; Victoria May 90 onwards	Adm. 20 June 1891
Vice-Admiral Sir George Tryon	20 August 1891	22 June 1893	Victoria	Died in commission; lost in Victoria
Admiral Sir Michael Culme-Seymour, 3rd Baronet	29 June 1893	10 November 1896	Ramillies	
Admiral Sir John Hopkins	10 November 1896	1 July 1899	Ramillies	
Admiral Sir John Fisher	1 July 1899	4 June 1902	Renown	
Admiral Sir Compton Domvile	4 June 1902	June 1905	Bulwark	
Admiral Lord Charles Beresford	appointed 1 May 1905 assumed command 6 June 1905	February 1907	Bulwark	
Admiral Sir Charles Drury	appointed 5 March 1907 assumed command 27 March 1907	1908	Queen	
Admiral Sir Assheton Curzon-Howe	appointed 20 November 1908 assumed command 20 November 1908	1910	Exmouth	
Admiral Sir Edmund Poë	appointed 30 April 1910 assumed command 30 April 1910	November 1912	Exmouth	
Admiral Sir Berkeley Milne	appointed 1 June 1912 assumed command 12 June 1912	27 August 1914	Inflexible	
Command in abeyance
Admiral Sir Somerset Gough-Calthorpe	26 August 1917	25 July 1919	Superb	Commander-in-Chief Mediterranean
Vice Admiral Sir John de Robeck	26 July 1919	14 May 1922	Iron Duke	
Vice Admiral Sir Osmond Brock	15 May 1922	7 June 1925	Iron Duke	Admiral 31 July 1924
Admiral Sir Roger Keyes	8 June 1925	7 June 1928	Warspite	
Admiral Sir Frederick Field	8 June 1928	28 May 1930	Queen Elizabeth	
Admiral Sir Ernle Chatfield	27 May 1930	31 October 1932	Queen Elizabeth	
Admiral Sir William Fisher	31 October 1932	19 March 1936	Resolution later Queen Elizabeth	
Admiral Sir Dudley Pound	20 March 1936	31 May 1939	Queen Elizabeth	
During World War II, the Fleet was split in two for a period. Post titles in the notes column.
Admiral Sir Andrew Cunningham	1 June 1939; 6 June 1939 assumed command	March 1942	Warspite August 1939; HMS St Angelo (base, Malta) April 1940; Warspite February 1941	Commander-in-Chief, Mediterranean Fleet. Vice-Admiral Cunningham was given acting rank of Admiral on 1 June 1940, and promoted to Admiral on 3 January 1941.
Admiral Sir Henry Harwood	22 April 1942	February 1943	Warspite; HMS Nile (base, Alexandria) Aug 1942	Commander-in-Chief, Mediterranean Fleet. Vice-Admiral Harwood was given acting rank of Admiral.
Admiral Sir Andrew Cunningham	1 November 1942	20 February 1943	HMS Hannibal (base, Algiers)	Naval Commander Expeditionary Force (NCXF) North Africa and Mediterranean
In February 1943 the Fleet was divided into the Mediterranean Fleet: Commander-in-Chief Mediterranean Fleet, 15th Cruiser Squadron, Cdre. (D) and the Levant: Commander-in-Chief, Levant, Alexandria, Malta, Port Said, Haifa, Bizerta, Tripoli, Mersa Matruh, Benghazi, Aden, Bone, Bougie, Philippeville; C-in-C Levant was renamed C-in-C Levant and Eastern Mediterranean in late December 1943. In January 1944 the two separate commands were re-unified with the Flag Officer, Levant and East Mediterranean (FOLEM) reporting to the C-in-C Mediterranean.
Admiral of the Fleet Sir Andrew Cunningham	20 February 1943	15 October 1943	HMS Hannibal (base, Algiers/Taranto)	Commander-in-Chief, Mediterranean Fleet.
Admiral Sir John Cunningham	15 October 1943	February 1946	HMS Hannibal (base, Algiers/Taranto)	Commander-in-Chief, Mediterranean Station & Allied Naval Commander Mediterranean
Admiral Sir Algernon Willis	1946	1948	HMS St Angelo (base, Malta)	
Admiral Sir Arthur Power	1948	1950	HMS St Angelo (base, Malta)	Commander-in-Chief, Mediterranean
Admiral Sir John Edelsten	1950	1952	HMS St Angelo (base, Malta)	Commander-in-Chief, Mediterranean
Admiral Louis Mountbatten, 1st Earl Mountbatten of Burma	1952	1954	HMS St Angelo (base, Malta)	Commander-in-Chief, Mediterranean
Admiral Sir Guy Grantham	10 Dec 1954	10 Apr 57	HMS St Angelo (base, Malta)	
Vice Admiral Sir Ralph Edwards	10 Apr 57	11 Nov 58	HMS St Angelo (base, Malta)	
Admiral Sir Charles Lambe	11 Nov 58	2 Feb 59	HMS Phoenicia (base, Malta)	
Admiral Sir Alexander Bingley	2 Feb 59	30 Jun 61	HMS Phoenicia (base, Malta)	
Admiral Sir Deric Holland-Martin	30 Jun 61	1 Feb 64	HMS Phoenicia (base, Malta)	
Admiral Sir John Hamilton	1 Feb 1964	5 June 1967	HMS St Angelo (base, Malta)	

==== Chief of Staff ====
The Chief of Staff Mediterranean Fleet was the principal staff officer (PSO), who is the coordinator of the supporting staff or a primary aide-de-camp to the Commander-in-Chief. Post existed from 1893 to 1967.

===== Senior Flag Officers =====
In command unit or formation	Date/s	Notes/Ref
Second-in-Command, Mediterranean Fleet	1861–1939	
Vice-Admiral Commanding, Light Forces and Second-in-Command Mediterranean Fleet	1940–1942	
Flag Officer, Air and Second-in-Command, Mediterranean Fleet	1947–1958	
Flag Officer, Mediterranean Aircraft Carriers	1940 to 1943	
Rear-Admiral, Mediterranean Fleet	1903 to 1905	

In 1938–39, Vice-Admiral J.C. Tovey held command of destroyers in the Mediterranean; from May 1941 to August 1942 Rear-Admiral I.G. Glennie served as Rear-Admiral, Destroyers; and from September 1942 to October 1943 Commodore P. Todd served as Commodore (Destroyers).

== Subordinate formations ==
At various times included the following:

In command of unit or formation	Date/s	Notes and Ref
Commodore, Adriatic Patrols	1915 to 1918	
Commodore-in-Charge, Algiers	December 1942 to February 1943	(Note: Commodore, Algeria reported to the C-in-C, Med Fleet from December 1942 to February 1943 the officer then reports to C-in-C, Levant until December 1943)
Commodore Commanding, British Adriatic Force	1917 to 1919	
Flag Officer Commanding Force H	1940 to 1941	
Flag Officer Commanding, Red Sea and Canal Area	May 1942 to February 1943	
Flag Officer, Gibraltar	1902 to 1939, 1946 to 1967	
Flag Officer, Gibraltar and North Atlantic	May to November 1939	(Note: The Flag Officer, Gibraltar and North Atlantic was elevated to the rank of Admiral from November 1939 until 1943 and did not report to the C-in-C, Med Fleet during this period)
Flag Officer, Gibraltar and Mediterranean Approaches	1943 to 1946	
Flag Officer, Levant and East Mediterranean	1944 to 1946	
Flag Officer, Malta (and Central Mediterranean, 1943–46)	1934 to 1943, 1946 to 1963	
Flag Officer, Western Mediterranean	July 1944 to May 1945	
Rear-Admiral, Alexandria	1939 to 1944	(Note: Rear-Admiral, Alexandria reported to the C-in-C, Med Fleet from November 1939 to February 1943 the officer then reports to C-in-C, Levant until December 1943)
Rear-Admiral, Egypt and Red Sea	1917 to 1920	
Rear-Admiral Commanding, 1st Cruiser Squadron	1914 to 1915, 1924 to 1939, 1947 to 1955	
Rear-Admiral Commanding, 2nd Cruiser Squadron	1946 to 1947	
Rear-Admiral Commanding, 3rd Cruiser Squadron	1939 to 1941	
Rear-Admiral Commanding, 12th Cruiser Squadron	1942 to 1943	
Rear-Admiral Commanding, 15th Cruiser Squadron	1942 to 1944	
Rear-Admiral Commanding, Black Sea, Caspian Sea and Sea of Marmora	1918 to 1919	
Rear-Admiral Commanding, British Adriatic Squadron (later Force)	1915 to 1917	
Rear-Admiral Commanding, Mediterranean Cruiser Squadron	1912	
Senior British Naval Officer, Suez Canal Area	1939 to 1942	
Senior Naval Officer-in-Charge, Suez	1941 to 1942	
Senior Naval Officer, Mudros	1915 to 1918	

Parts of the Admiral of Patrols' Auxiliary Patrol during World War One were within the Mediterranean. Several patrol zones were under British authority.

In addition, Rear-Admiral R.J.R. Scott served as the Rear-Admiral, Training Establishments Mediterranean, supervising the training base HMS Canopus at Alexandria, Egypt from May to August 1942.

=== Shore sub-commands ===
In February 1943 all existing shore based commands were transferred under the Commander-in-Chief, Levant until January 1944 they then came back under the control of the C-in-C Med Fleet.

Shore sub-commands included:

Location	In Command	Dates	Notes/Ref
Aden	Naval Officer-in-Charge, Aden	1935 to 1938	
Alexandria	Naval Officer-in-Charge, Cyprian Ports	1941 to 1943	
Bone	Naval Officer-in-Charge, Bone	January to February 1943	
Bougie	Naval Officer-in-Charge, Bougie	January to February 1943	
Brindisi	British Senior Naval Officer, Brindisi	1916 to 1918	
Genoa	Senior Naval Officer, Genoa	1919	
Gibraltar	Senior Officer, Gibraltar	1889 to 1902	
Haifa	Naval Officer in Charge, Haifa	1935 to 1939	
Haifa	Naval Officer-in-Charge, Palestinian Ports	1940 to 1943	
Mersa Matruh	Naval Officer-in-Charge, Mersa Matruh	1941 to 1943	
Mudros	Captain of Base, Mudros	1918 to 1920	
Phillippeville	Naval Officer-in-Charge, Phillippeville	January to February 1943	
Port Said	Naval Officer-in-Charge, Port Said	December, 1916 to February 1943	
Salonika	Divisional Naval Transport Officer, Salonika	26 January 1917 to 16 April 1919	
Taranto	Senior Naval Officer, Taranto	December, 1918 to March 1919	
Trieste	Naval Transport Officer in Charge, Trieste	January 1916 to December 1918	

In command of unit or formation	Date/s	Notes and Ref
Principal Naval Transport Officer, Mudros	31 August 1915 – 20 January 1916	Commodore-in-Command
Principal Naval Transport Officer, Salonika	20 January 1916 – June, 1916	Commodore-in-Command
