= Senior British Naval Officer, Suez Canal Area =

- Active: 1939-1942
- Country: United Kingdom
- Branch: Royal Navy
- Type: Military command
- Part of: East Indies Station (1939-1941); Mediterranean Fleet (1941-1942)
- Garrison/HQ: HMS Stag, Ismailia, Egypt

The Senior British Naval Officer, Suez Canal Area was an administrative appointment of the Royal Navy established during World war II who was responsible for the naval base HMS Stag at Ismailia, Egypt. The SBNO was subordinate to the East Indies Station from 1939 to 1941 then the Mediterranean Fleet until 1942.

Vice-Admiral Sir James M. Pipon KBE, CB, CMG, MMO, (ret.) was the only SBNO Suez Canal Area, serving from 14 December 1939 until August, 1942.

== History ==
The post of Senior British Naval Officer, Suez Canal Area was established on 14 December 1939, Vice Admiral Murray Pipon taking command on 7 January 1940. Pipon was shore based, at Ismailia in Egypt. He reported directly to the Commander-in-Chief Mediterranean Fleet. In the Navy List for December 1940 Pipon is shown as borne on the books of Stag, 'additional, for various services.' On 14 November 1941 the Senior Naval Officer-in-Charge, Suez who was based at Port Tawfik was placed under the command of the Flag Officer, Red Sea whilst the Senior British Naval Officer Suez Canal Area remained responsible for dealing with all British naval policy questions in regards to the Suez Canal Company. In August 1942 further restructuring led to the creation of a new post, Flag Officer Commanding, Red Sea and Canal Area, who assumed Pipon's duties.

HMS Stag was the base for British naval personnel in Ismailia, Egypt during World War II. First established at Port Said in December 1939. There were outposts at Adabya, Kabrit, and Generiffa. The station was closed in May 1949.

== Sub-commands ==
=== Naval Officer-in-Charge, Palestinian Ports ===
	Rank	Flag	Name	Term	Notes/Ref
Naval Officer-in-Charge, Palestinian Ports
1	Captain		G. O. Lydekker	25 June 1940 – August, 1942	in post till December 1943

=== Naval Officer-in-Charge, Port Said ===
	Rank	Flag	Name	Term	Notes/Ref
Naval Officer-in-Charge, Port Said
1	Captain		W.B. Hynes	6 February 1940 – 20 March 1942	retired
2	Captain		H.L.I. Kirkpatrick	20 March 1942 – August, 1942	ditto

== Sources ==
- Brown, David (2013). The Royal Navy and the Mediterranean: Vol.II: November 1940-December 1941. Cambridge, England: Routledge. ISBN 9781136341274.
- Houterman, Jerome N..; Koppes, Jeroen (2004–2006). "Royal Navy, Mediterranean Fleet 1939-1945". www.unithistories.com. Houterman and Koppes.
- Stationery Office, H.M. (December 1940). The Navy List. Edinburgh Scotland: National Library of Scotland.
- Warlow, Ben (2000). "6". Shore establishments of the Royal Navy : being a list of the static ships and establishments of the Royal Navy (2nd ed.). Cornwall, England: Maritime. ISBN 9780907771739.
