= HMS Euphrates (shore establishment) =

British military unit

- Active: 1916-1919; 1942-45
- Country: United Kingdom
- Branch: Royal Navy
- Type: Naval shore establishment
- Part of: Red Sea Station (1916-1919); Senior Naval Officer, Persian Gulf (1942-1945)
- Garrison/HQ: Basra; Iraq (1916-1919)

HMS Euphrates was a naval shore establishment of the British Royal Navy during World War I and World War II. By 1945 it hosted the Naval Officer in Charge, Basra.

== History ==
During the First World War the British established HMS Euphrates, in the port city of Basra, Iraq on the river Euphrates. The station was disestablished after the first world war.

After August 1941, with the success of the Anglo-Soviet invasion of Iran, HMS Euphrates was reestablished at the former Iranian Navy base at Khurramshahr on the Shatt-al-Arab. Euphrates came under command of the Senior Naval Officer, Persian Gulf, until 1945.
