= HMS Alexandra =

1875 Royal Navy ship

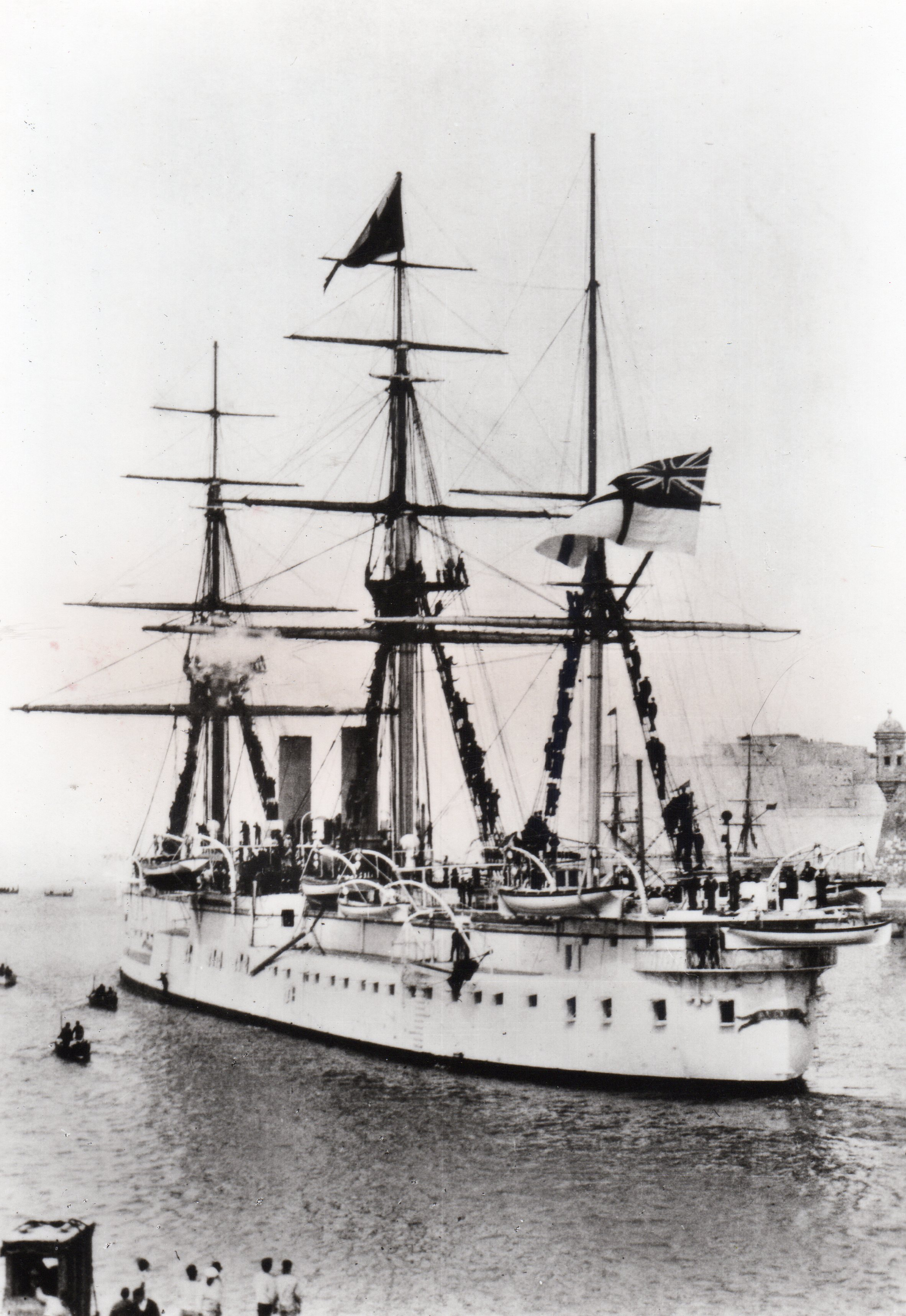
- HMS Alexandra in 1886

History

United Kingdom
- Namesake: Alexandra, Princess of Wales
- Builder: Chatham Dockyard
- Laid down: 5 March 1873
- Launched: 7 April 1875
- Commissioned: 31 January 1877
- Fate: Sold 1908 and broken up

General characteristics
- Displacement: 9,490 tons
- Length: 325 ft (99 m) pp, 344 ft (105 m) oa
- Beam: 63 ft 8 in (19.41 m)
- Draught: 26 ft 6 in (8.08 m)
- Propulsion: 2-shaft Humphreys vertical inverted compound, 8,498 ihp (6.337 MW)
- Speed: 15 knots (28 km/h; 17 mph)
- Complement: 674
- Armament: 1877: Two RML 11 inch 25 ton gun; Ten RML 10 inch 18 ton gun; Six RBL 20 pounder Armstrong gun; Four torpedo carriages; 1891: Four BL 9.2 inch gun Mk III; Eight 10-inch muzzle-loading rifles; Six BL 4 inch naval gun Mk II; 1897: Four 9.2-inch (230 mm) breech-loaders; Eight 10-inch muzzle-loading rifles; Six QF 4.7 inch Gun Mk IV
- Armour: Main deck battery 12 inches (300 mm); Upper deck battery 8 inches (200 mm); Belt 12 inches tapering to 6 inches (150 mm); Bulkheads 8 inches (200 mm) to 5 inches (130 mm); Deck 1.5 inches (38 mm) to 1-inch (25 mm)

HMS Alexandra was a central battery ironclad of the Victorian Royal Navy, whose seagoing career was from 1877 to 1900. She spent much of her career as a flagship, and took part in operations to deter the Russian Empire's aggression against the Ottoman Empire in 1878 and the bombardment of Alexandria in 1882. She was affectionately known by her crew as Old Alex. She was named after the Princess of Wales, later Queen Alexandra.

== Background ==
At the time of her design the Board of Admiralty were at loggerheads amongst themselves as regards the provision of sails in their contemporary warships; steam engine design had advanced to the point where ships could cross the Atlantic under steam power alone, but centuries of tradition had left an ingrained emotional attachment to sails in a small but influential number of the senior members of the naval hierarchy. This minority succeeded in convincing the Board to design Alexandra as a rigged central battery vessel.

== Design ==
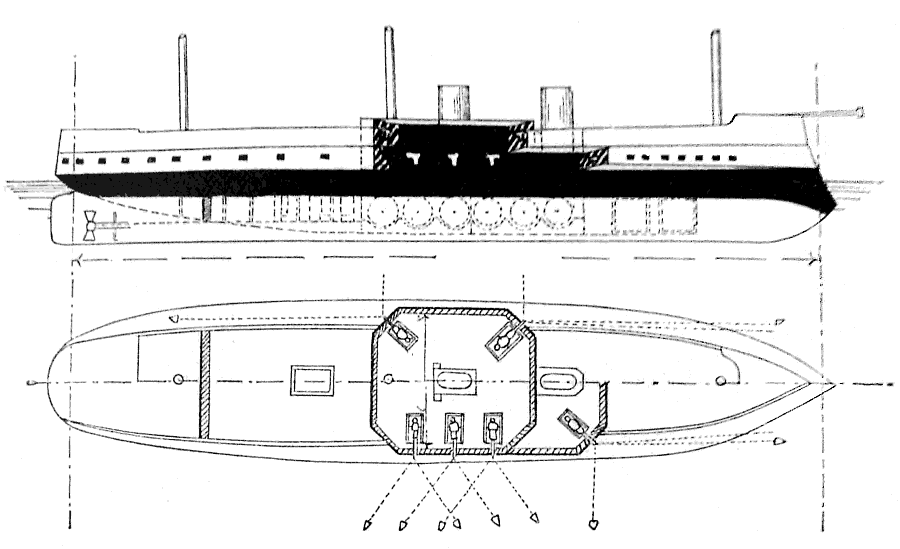
Right elevation and deck plan as depicted in Harpers Monthly, February 1886

=== General characteristics ===
The Alexandra had an overall length of 344 feet (105 m) a length of 325 feet (99 m) between perpendiculars a beam of 63 feet (19 m) and a draught of 26 feet (7.9 m)

=== Propulsion ===
The Alexandra was the first true battleship to feature compound engines, with twin shafts driven by Humphreys and Tennant three-cylinder compound engines. Each side of the 70-inch high-pressure cylinder was fitted with a 90-inch low-pressure cylinder, with all cylinders elaborately steam-jacked to avoid wasting heat. In contrast to the horizontal engines of earlier steam warships, which were kept below the waterline for protection, the 12-inch belt on the Alexandra was deemed sufficient. This simpler, vertical arrangement was adopted.The engines were arranged on high seats to protect them from damage in the event of grounding, an all too common event in the nineteenth-century Navy.

They were also braced to withstand the shock of ramming. The ship was equipped with twelve cylindrical boilers, housed in four separate boiler rooms, separated by both a transverse and a longitudinal bulkhead. The working pressure of the boilers was recorded at 60 pounds-force per square inch (410 kPa) giving it a power of 8498 ihp. The boilers were arranged in a back-to-back configuration against the centreline bulkhead, ensuring convenient access to the wing bunkers. Each boiler contained 200 lbs of zinc anodes, a configuration that proved effective, with the boilers lasting 16 years before being replaced.

A pair of auxiliary engines, each of 600 indicated horsepower (450 kW), were fitted to turn the screws while the ship was proceeding under sail. These engines could, if required, propel the ship at a speed of 14.5 knots (26.9 km/h). At the time of her completion Alexandra was the fastest battleship afloat. Alexandra was equipped with a sophisticated ventilation system, comprising steam-powered fans and valves fitted at each bulkhead for the first time. These valves were designed to prevent the spread of fire and smoke. The hollow lower masts, utilised as ventilation exhausts, were identified as a significant fire hazard due to their ability to generate a powerful updraught. The engine-room complement comprised a Chief Engineer, ten Assistants and eighty stokers. Her sail area was 27,000 square feet (2,500 m^{2}).

=== Armament ===
Her armament was disposed in a central box battery, with heavy guns deployed both on the main and on the upper deck. Recognising the increasing importance of axial fire, Barnaby arranged the artillery so that, by firing through embrasures, there was the capability of deploying four heavy guns to fire dead ahead, and two astern; all guns could if required fire on the broadside. When the Alexandra was first completed for sea, she was armed with a pair of 11-inch 25-ton rifled muzzle-loaders and eight 10-inch of 18 tons, all mounted on Scott carriages and slides. The central battery, positioned on the upperdeck, took the form of a rectangular oblong measuring 69 feet internally fore-and-aft, and 55 feet athwartships, with a slice cut off at each corner for a gun port, providing an arc of fire from the line of keel to a little beyond the beam. The two ports at the forward end were occupied by the two 11-inch guns, and the two at the aft end by the 10-inch guns.

The remaining eight 10-inch guns formed the main deck armament. A transverse armoured bulkhead with armoured communication doors between them divided the battery at that level into two compartments of different sizes. This configuration presumably served as an additional measure of protection against raking fire from ahead, given that it added a significant amount of weight with no discernible other function. The final compartment, the largest, was an underlying repetition in shape and dimensions of the upper battery that stood immediately above it. However, instead of the four corner ports of the latter, it had three on each side, at which stood six 10-inch guns with broadside arcs of fire. The smaller compartment constituted a forward extension or addition to the larger, situated beyond the dividing bulkhead. It featured a deeply embrasured corner port on each side, providing a 10-inch gun with an arc of fire from right ahead to 7° abaft the beam. This configuration served to augment the volume of chase or bow fire, albeit under normally favourable conditions, as the embrasures were prone to shipping such green water during steaming against a heavy head sea, thereby precluding the opening of the ports. Alexandra was the first battleship to carry Whitehead torpedoes as part of her armament. She stowed a dozen of the original inventor's own design and production, having 16-inch diameter, a speed of 8 knots and a range of 700 yards. The torpedoes were fired by air impulse through a port from an open frame iron carriage and charged with 60 lb. of gun-cotton. Following her initial commissioning, these were replaced with a new design, featuring a 14-inch diameter and a 30-pound charge. This new model exhibited superior speed and range. As with all British battleships of that period, she was also equipped with a dozen 500-lb. mines, fired electrically by observation through an armoured cable circuit. These served as a means of protection if lying at an otherwise undefended anchorage in wartime, or, conversely, for clearing a passage through a minefield by countermining.

=== Protection ===
The Alexandra was equipped with an armoured belt that extended from port to aft, with a thickness ranging from 12 inches amidships to 6 inches at the bow and stern. The belt measured 10.5 feet in width and was designed to provide sufficient protection for the vessel. The armour was designed to rise 25 feet above the water level at the battery, with 8-inch plating as its highest layer to cover the upper tier. Transversely, the upper guns were protected by 6-inch armoured bulkheads, and the lower by an 8-inch bulkhead forward and a 6-inch aft, with another 6-inch dividing the battery internally. A unique feature of the Alexandra was the position of an after 5-inch armoured bulkhead lying athwartships at waterline level 65 feet from the stern, with the object of affording extra protection to the engines against a raking from aft. However, the Alexandra had no conning tower until she underwent a partial conversion at fifteen years of age. During her third commission, at ten years old, she was fitted with the new swinging-boom net defence against torpedoes, of the pattern at that time in process of issue to all British battleships.

== Service history ==
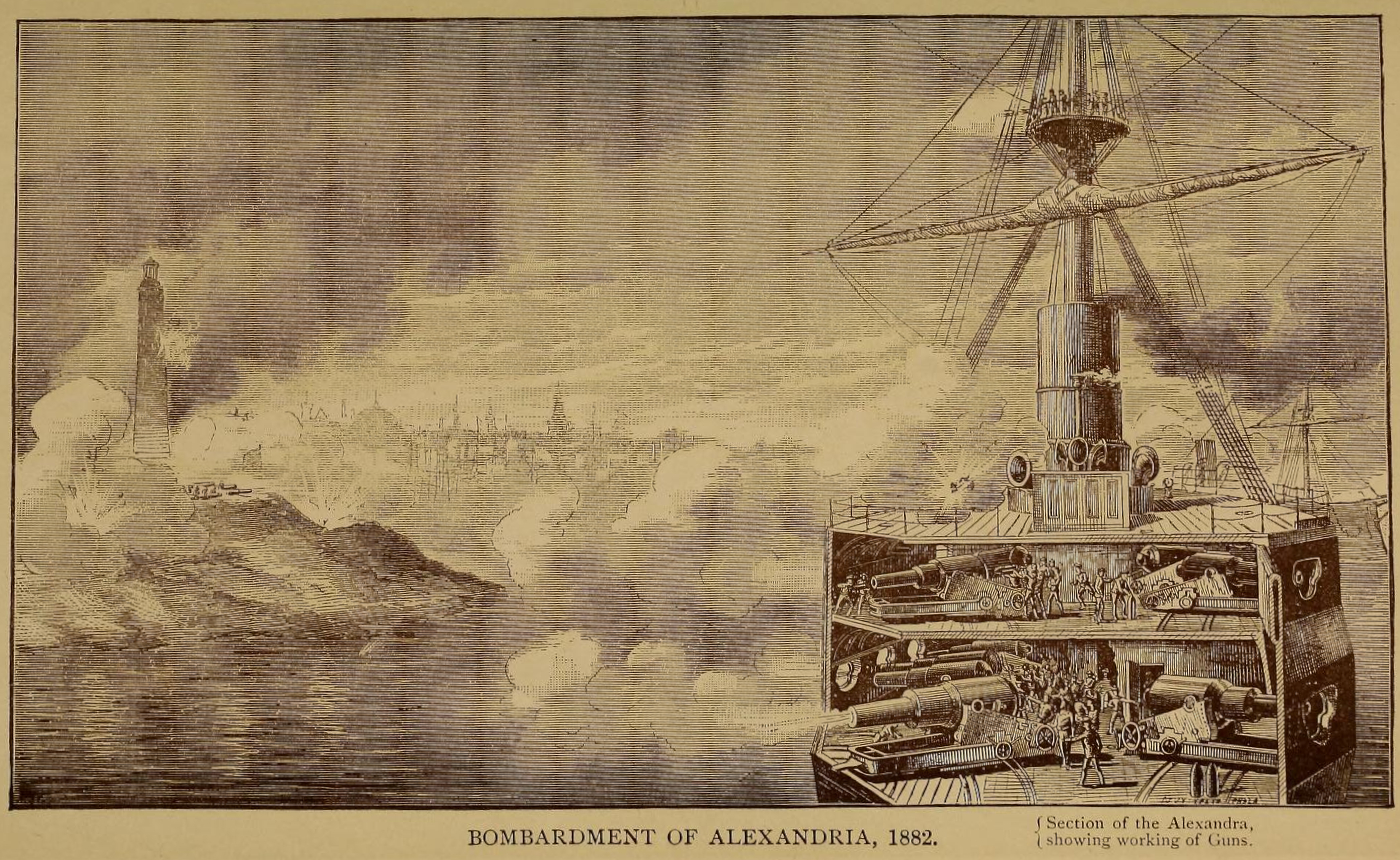
Bombardment of Alexandria, 1882. A section of the Alexandra showing working of her guns

It had been intended to call the ship HMS Superb, but the name was changed at her launching, which was undertaken by Her Royal Highness the Princess of Wales (later Queen Alexandra) on 7 April 1875. She was the first British ironclad to be launched by a member of the royal family; the Duke and Duchess of Edinburgh, the Duke and Duchess of Teck and the Duke of Cambridge were also present. The religious element of the service (the first at a ship launch since the Reformation) was conducted by Archibald Campbell Tait the then Archbishop of Canterbury assisted by Thomas Legh Claughton, the Bishop of Rochester.

She was commissioned at Chatham on 2 January 1877 as flagship, Mediterranean Fleet, and held this position continuously until 1889. She was the flagship of Admiral Hornby in his passage through the Dardanelles during the Russian war scare of 1878. On 9 February, she ran aground in bad weather at the narrowest part of the strait and was towed off by HMS Sultan in time to lead the squadron to Constantinople. On 4 October 1879, HMS Alexandra collided with HMS Achilles off Cyprus, holing the latter vessel with her propeller. She was present at the bombardment of Alexandria in 1882; in this action the Admiral's flag was shifted to HMS Invincible, as she was of shallower draught and could sail closer to shore. During this action on 11 July 1882, under command of Captain C. F. Hotham, Gunner Israel Harding flung a live 10-inch enemy shell into a tub of water, an action which led to the award of the Victoria Cross. In 1886, the Duke of Edinburgh hoisted his flag on board, and Prince George of Wales, later King George V, joined as a lieutenant. She paid off in 1889 for modernisation.

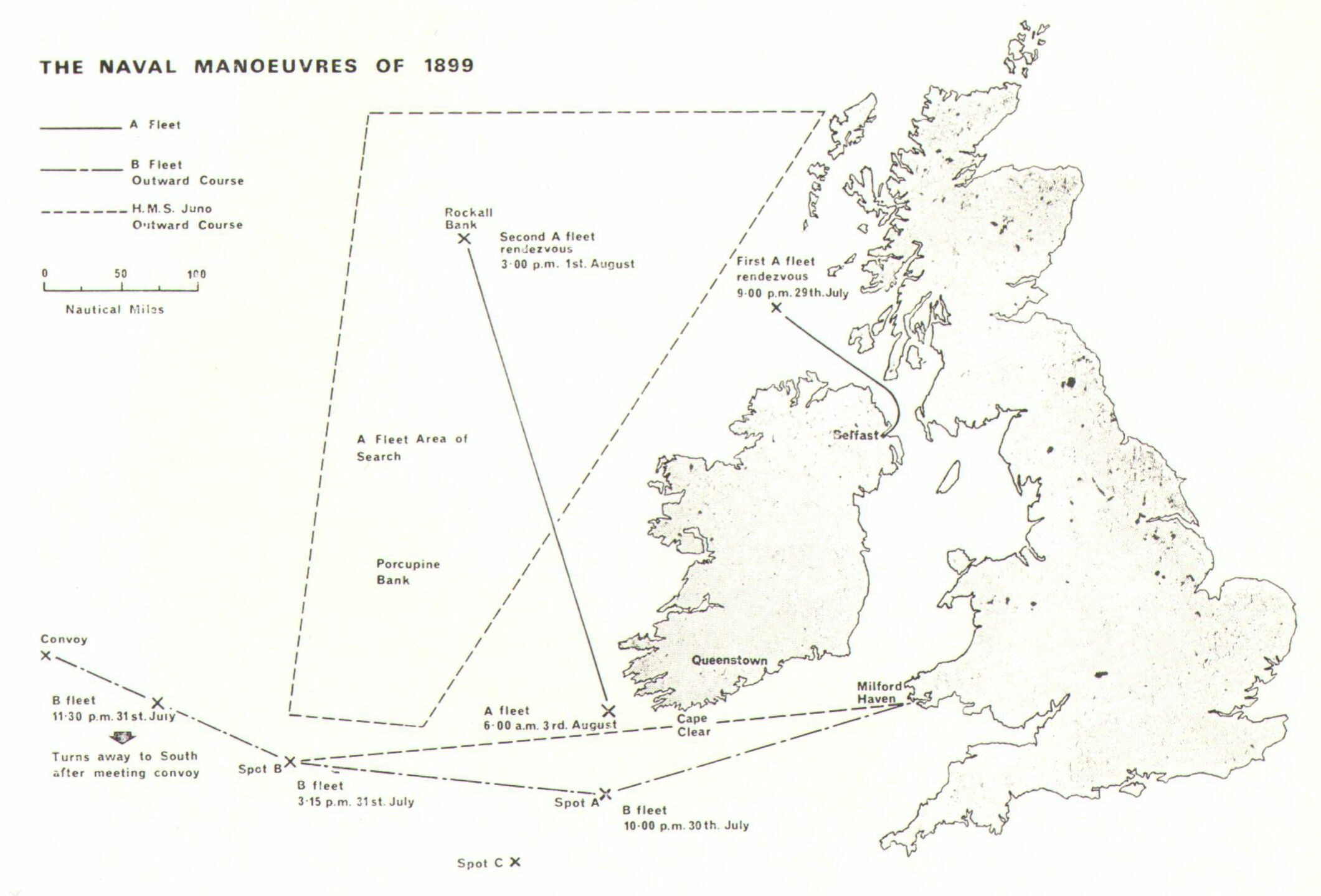
Map of the Naval Manoeuvres of 1899

In 1891, she was flagship of the Admiral Superintendent of Naval Reserves at Portsmouth, and remained so until 1901. Alexandra was featured in the first volume of the Navy and Army Illustrated in early c. April 1896 and was then described as a "coastguard ship at Portsmouth" with her principal armament being eight 18-tons guns, four 22-ton, six 4-inch and four six-pounder and six three-pounder quick firers. At this time, she had a complement of 408 officers and men and was commanded by Captain W.H. Pigott. Her last sea-time was as flagship of the 'B' fleet in the manoeuvres of 1899, which included tests of the use of wireless. On 31 July she received a wireless message from HMS Europa relayed by HMS Juno over a distance of 95 miles, the longest distance to date for a naval transmission. In 1903 she became a mechanical training ship, and she was sold in 1908.

== Bibliography ==
- Ballard, G. A. (1980). The Black Battlefleet. Naval Institute Press. ISBN 0-87021-924-3.
- Brown, David K. (2010). Warrior to Dreadnought: Warship Development 1860–1905. Chatham Publishing. ISBN 1-86176-022-1. OCLC 1342469306.
- Goodrich, Caspar F. (1885). Report of the British naval and military operations in Egypt, 1882. Washington D.C.: U.S. Government Printing Office. OCLC 301706525.
- Colledge, J. J.; Warlow, Ben (2006) [1969]. Ships of the Royal Navy: The Complete Record of All Fighting Ships of the Royal Navy from the 15th Century to the Present (3rd Rev ed.). London: Chatham Publishing. ISBN 978-1-86176-281-8. OCLC 67375475.
- Fraser, Edward (1904). Famous fighters of the fleet; glimpses through the cannon smoke in the days of the old navy. London: Macmillan. OCLC 1345782.
- Friedman, Norman (2018). British Battleships of the Victorian Era. Naval Institute Press. ISBN 978-1-68247-329-0.
- Parkes, Oscar (1990) [1966]. British Battleships, Warrior 1860 to Vanguard 1950: A History of Design, Construction, and Armament (New & rev. ed.). Naval Institute Press. ISBN 1-55750-075-4.
- Pocock, R. F.; Garratt, Gerald Reginald Mansel (1972). The Origins of Maritime Radio: The Story of the Introduction of wireless telegraphy in the Royal Navy Between 1896 and 1900. H.M. Stationery Office. ISBN 978-0-11-290113-6.
- Roberts, John (1979). "Great Britain (including Empire Forces)". In Chesneau, Roger & Kolesnik, Eugene M. (eds.). Conway's All the World's Fighting Ships 1860–1905. Mayflower Books. pp. 1–113. ISBN 0-8317-0302-4.
