= Sir Michael Culme-Seymour, 3rd Baronet =

Royal Navy Admiral (1836–1920)

Admiral Sir Michael Culme-Seymour Bt GCB GCVO
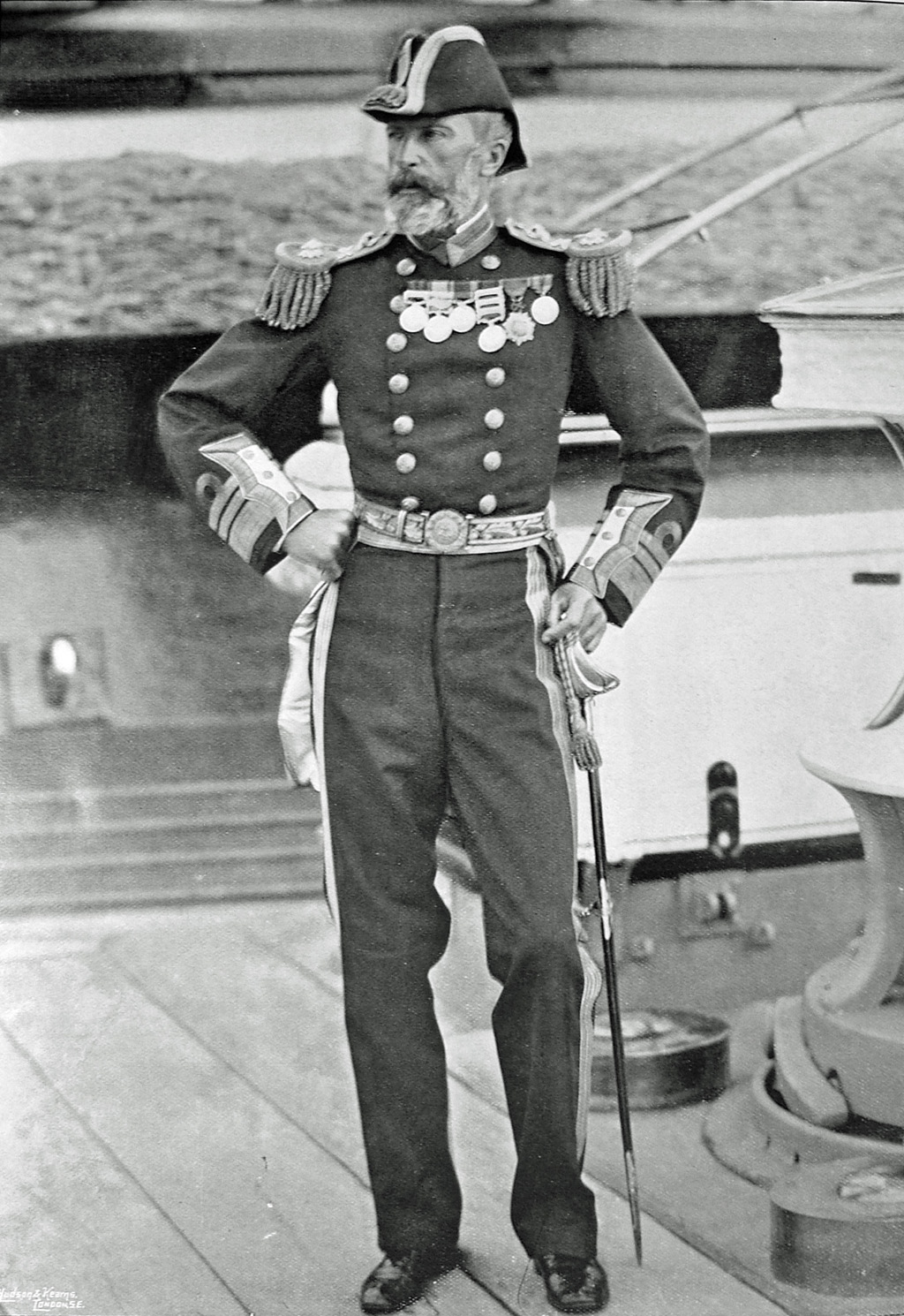
- Born: 13 March 1836; Berkhamsted, Hertfordshire
- Died: 11 October 1920 (aged 84); Oundle, Northamptonshire
- Spouse: Mary Georgina Watson (m. 1866)
- Relatives: Vice Admiral Sir Michael Culme-Seymour, 4th Baronet (son)
- Military career
- Allegiance: United Kingdom
- Branch: Royal Navy
- Service years: 1850–1901
- Rank: Admiral
- Commands: Commander-in-Chief, Portsmouth (1897–00); Mediterranean Fleet (1893–96); Channel Fleet (1890–92); Pacific Station (1885–87); HMS Duke of Wellington (1879–82); HMS Temeraire (1877–79); HMS Monarch (1876–77); HMS Volage (1870–74); HMS Wanderer (1861–65)
- Conflicts: Second Opium War
- Awards: Knight Grand Cross of the Order of the Bath; Knight Grand Cross of the Royal Victorian Order

Admiral Sir Michael Culme-Seymour, 3rd Baronet, GCB, GCVO (13 March 1836 – 11 October 1920) was a senior Royal Navy officer. On 17 September 1880 he became 3rd Baronet, on the death of his father. The Culme-Seymours were relatives of the Seymour family, his father having added his wife's family name – Culme – to his own following her death.

== Naval career ==
Culme-Seymour was born in Northchurch, Berkhamsted 13 March 1836, the son of Sir John Hobart Culme-Seymour, 2nd Baronet (1800–1880) and his wife Elizabeth Culme, daughter of Reverend Thomas Culme. He entered the Navy in 1850, and in 1856 served as mate in HMS Calcutta, flagship of the East Indies squadron, which was involved in the Second Opium War. The fleet was commanded by Rear-Admiral Sir Michael Seymour (his uncle), while Calcutta was commanded by William King-Hall. On 25 May 1857 he was promoted to lieutenant, continuing to serve on Calcutta until 6 June 1859, when he was promoted again to commander. From 20 June 1861 to 16 August 1865 he commanded HMS Wanderer in the Mediterranean Fleet. On 16 December 1865 he was promoted to captain.

In December 1870 he commanded HMS Volage in the Channel Squadron. From 1874 to 1876 he was private secretary to First Lord of the Admiralty, George Ward Hunt. In 1876 he returned to the Mediterranean, commanding HMS Monarch. In July 1877 he transferred to HMS Temeraire and took part in the 1878 passage of the Dardanelles commanded by Vice-Admiral Sir Geoffrey Phipps Hornby. In 1879 he was appointed a naval aide-de-camp to the Queen.

From 29 July 1879 to 9 May 1882 he was captain of HMS Duke of Wellington, which was the flagship of the officer commanding Portsmouth harbour, Admiral Alfred Phillips Ryder, at the end of which appointment he was promoted to rear-admiral. 1885 saw him as second in command of the Baltic squadron under Phipps Hornby during the Panjdeh Incident. From 5 July 1885 to 20 September 1887 he was commander in chief of the Pacific squadron. He was promoted to vice-admiral on 19 June 1888 and from 1890 he commanded the Channel Fleet for two years. He was promoted to admiral in 1893.

From 3 May 1893 to 10 November 1896 he was Commander in Chief, Mediterranean Fleet, replacing George Tryon after the accidental sinking of HMS Victoria in a collision. He was promoted to full admiral before taking up the command.

From 3 August 1897 to 3 October 1900 he was Commander-in-Chief, Portsmouth, and in March 1901 he was placed on the retired list.

In 1899 he was appointed First and Principal Naval Aide-de-Camp to Queen Victoria. He was re-appointed after the succession of the new King Edward VII, in February 1901, but resigned from the position in April the same year.

On the death of Queen Victoria, Culme-Seymour took part in the procession from Osborne House to Trinity Pier on 1 February 1901, taking up position immediately behind the gun carriage carrying the coffin. He then accompanied the coffin on board HM Yacht Alberta.

In early 1901 Sir Michael was asked by King Edward to take part in a special diplomatic mission to announce the King's accession to the governments of Belgium, Bavaria, Italy, Württemberg, and The Netherlands.

He was granted the honorary offices of Vice-Admiral of the United Kingdom and Lieutenant of the Admiralty in July 1901, and kept these until his death.

He died at Oundle in Northamptonshire in 1920.

== Honours ==
Culme-Seymour was appointed to the 5th class of the Order of the Medjidie in 1858. He was promoted to the first class of that order in 1894.

He was appointed a Knight Commander of the Order of the Bath (KCB) in 1893, and advance to Knight Grand Cross of that Order (GCB) in the 1897 Diamond Jubilee Honours. His installation as a Knight Grand Cross took place in 1913. He was appointed a Knight Grand Cross of the Royal Victorian Order (GCVO) in 1901.

== Family ==
He married 16 October 1866 Mary Georgina Watson, daughter of the Hon Richard Watson, MP (1800–1852) and granddaughter of the 2nd Lord Sondes. Lady Culme-Seymour died in 1912. They had three sons and two daughters.

His eldest son, Sir Michael Culme-Seymour (1867–1925) succeeded him in the baronetcy, and was himself a senior naval officer.

His daughter Mary Elizabeth Culme-Seymour (1871–1944) married Vice Admiral Sir Trevylyan Napier.

His younger son, George Culme-Seymour (1878–1915) was a captain in the King's Royal Rifle Corps and served as Adjutant in the Queen Victoria's Rifles during the Great War. He was killed during the Second Battle of Ypres on 7 May 1915 leading a company from the QVRs over a trench barricade in an attempt to recapture Hill 60. He is remembered on the Menin Gate in Ypres.

One of his daughters, it is not clear which, was alleged to have secretly married George V when he was a young naval officer. This long-standing rumour was eventually published by Edward Mylius in November 1910. Sir Michael, Mary, and all three of his sons (but not his wife) testified at the trial in 1911. His younger daughter Laura had, by that time, died. The details of the accusation were proven to be false, and Mylius was jailed for criminal libel. However, an 1891 newspaper report later came to light, saying that Mary, who had claimed not to have met George V between 1879 and 1898, had in fact opened a ball at Portsmouth Town Hall on 21 August 1891 by dancing with him.

His great-great-granddaughter is comedian and actress Miranda Hart.

Military offices
Preceded by Sir John Baird	Commander-in-Chief, Pacific Station; 1885–1887	Succeeded by Sir Algernon Heneage
Preceded by Sir John Baird	Commander-in-Chief, Channel Fleet; 1890–1892	Succeeded by Sir Henry Fairfax
Preceded by Sir George Tryon	Commander-in-Chief, Mediterranean Fleet; 1893–1896	Succeeded by Sir John Hopkins
Preceded by Sir Nowell Salmon	Commander-in-Chief, Portsmouth; 1897–1900	Succeeded by Sir Charles Hotham
Honorary titles
Preceded by Sir Nowell Salmon	First and Principal Naval Aide-de-Camp; 1899–1901	Succeeded by Sir James Erskine
Vacant Title last held by Sir Michael Seymour	Vice-Admiral of the United Kingdom; 1901–1920	Succeeded by Sir Francis Bridgeman
Baronetage of the United Kingdom
Preceded by John Culme-Seymour	Baronet (of Highmount and Friery Park); 1880–1920	Succeeded by Michael Culme-Seymour
