= Maxwell Richmond =

Royal Navy Vice Admiral (1900–1986)

Vice Admiral Sir Maxwell Richmond KBE CB DSO (19 October 1900 – 15 May 1986) was a New Zealand-born officer in the Royal Navy.

Born in Wellington, New Zealand, on 19 October 1900, Richmond was the son of Robert Richardson Richmond and Bernadette Beatrice Richmond (née Farrell), and the grandson of politician, lawyer and jurist, William Richmond. He was educated at Christchurch Boys' High School from 1914 to 1916, and joined the Royal Navy in 1918. He was promoted to lieutenant in 1922, and attained the rank of captain in 1942, rear admiral in 1952. He was appointed Deputy Chief of Naval Personnel, (Training) from July 1952 to July 1954. Promoted to vice admiral in 1954. He retired in about 1957.

During World War II, he commanded HMS Basilisk (sunk by air attack on 1 June 1940 during the Dunkirk evacuation) and HMS Hostile (scuttled on 23 August 1940 after being damaged by a mine).

Richmond was appointed an Officer of the Order of the British Empire on 1 January 1940. He was twice mentioned in dispatches during World War II: in 1940 following the sinking of HMS Basilisk; and in 1945 for good service, zeal and devotion to duty during the advance on the French–Italian border. He was appointed a Companion of the Distinguished Service Order in July 1942 and received the Order of the Red Banner in November 1942 from the Soviet Union by for his role during the Arctic convoys. He was awarded the Croix de guerre by the French government in 1945. In the 1954 New Year Honours Richmond was appointed a Companion of the Order of the Bath. In August 1955 he was appointed Flag Officer, Air and Second-in-Command, Mediterranean Fleet until October 1956. In the 1957 Queen's Birthday Honours he was promoted to Knight Commander of the Order of the British Empire in recognition of distinguished service during the Suez Crisis.

He died at Whangārei, New Zealand, on 15 May 1986.
