= Flag Officer, Air and Second-in-Command, Mediterranean Fleet =

- Active: 1861-1958
- Country: United Kingdom
- Allegiance: British Empire
- Branch: Royal Navy
- Part of: Mediterranean Fleet

Commanders
- Notable commanders: Vice-Admiral Ralph A. B. Edwards

The Flag Officer, Air and Second-in-Command, Mediterranean Fleet was a senior command appointment of the British Royal Navy from January 1947 to 1958 who also administered the 2nd Aircraft Carrier Squadron from 1947 to 1951. The appointment was a continuation of the Second-in-Command, Mediterranean Station first established in 1861 that underwent a series of name changes due to an expansion of additional duties given to the post holder.

== History ==
The office holder was originally established as Second-in-Command, Mediterranean Station in December 1861 then later Second-in-Command, Mediterranean Fleet. On 18 July 1941 as part of an expansion of duties the post holder was renamed Vice-Admiral Commanding, Light Forces and Second-in-Command Mediterranean Fleet until April 1942. The appointment of the Flag Officer, Air, and Second-in-Command, Mediterranean Fleet was created in January 1947 who was additionally responsible for administering the 2nd Aircraft Carrier Squadron of the Mediterranean Fleet until February 1951 when it was disbanded. The Flag Officer, Air and Second-in-Command, Mediterranean Fleet, then became responsible for commanding shore based aviation based at Malta until 1958. HMS Ocean, Theasus and Glory continued to serve in the Mediterranean Fleet until October 1954.

== Second-in-Command, Mediterranean Fleet ==
Included:

Note:The office holder was sometimes styled as "Second-in-Command, Mediterranean Station"

| | Rank | Flag | Name | Term | Notes/Ref |
|---|---|---|---|---|---|
Second-in-Command Mediterranean Fleet/Station
| 1 | Rear-Admiral | Rear-Admiral - Royal Navy | Sydney C. Dacres | December 1861-April 1863 | |
| 2 | Rear-Admiral | Rear-Admiral - Royal Navy | Hastings R.H. Yelverton | April 1863-April 1865 | |
| 3 | Rear-Admiral | Rear-Admiral - Royal Navy | Astley Cooper-Key | May 1870-August 1872 | |
| 4 | Vice-Admiral | Vice-Admiral - Royal Navy | Edward A. Inglefield | 2 August 1872-December 1876 | |
| 5 | Rear-Admiral | Rear-Admiral - Royal Navy | Edward B. Rice | May 1876-July 1877 | |
| 6 | Rear-Admiral | Rear-Admiral - Royal Navy | Sir John E. Commerell | July 1877-1878 | |
| 7 | Rear-Admiral | Rear-Admiral - Royal Navy | Lord Walter Kerr | April 1890-April 1892 | |
| 8 | Rear-Admiral | Rear-Admiral - Royal Navy | Albert Hastings Markham | April 1892-April 1894 | |
| 9 | Rear-Admiral | Rear-Admiral - Royal Navy | Compton E. Domvile | April 1894-May 1896 | |
| 10 | Rear-Admiral | Rear-Admiral - Royal Navy | Robert H. Harris | May 1896-February 1898 | |
| 11 | Rear-Admiral | Rear-Admiral - Royal Navy | Sir Gerard H. U. Noel | 1 February 1898-February 1900 | |
| 12 | Rear-Admiral | Rear-Admiral - Royal Navy | Lord Charles W. De la P. Beresford | February 1900-January 1902 | |
| 13 | Rear-Admiral | Rear-Admiral - Royal Navy | Burges Watson | January-September 1902 | |
| 14 | Rear-Admiral | Rear-Admiral - Royal Navy | Sir Reginald N. Custance | November 1902-November 1904 | |
| 15 | Vice-Admiral | Vice-Admiral - Royal Navy | Sir Harry T. Grenfell | November 1904-February 1906 | |
| 16 | Rear-Admiral | Rear-Admiral - Royal Navy | Francis C. B. Bridgeman | March 1906-February 1907 | |
| 17 | Vice-Admiral | Vice-Admiral - Royal Navy | Prince Louis of Battenberg | February 1907-November 1908 | |
| 18 | Rear-Admiral | Rear-Admiral - Royal Navy | Sir George A. Callaghan | November 1908-October 1910 | |
| 19 | Rear-Admiral | Rear-Admiral - Royal Navy | T. Martyn Jerram | October 1910-May 1912 | |
| 20 | Vice-Admiral | Vice-Admiral - Royal Navy | Sir Cecil Burney | June-October 1913 | |
| 21 | Vice-Admiral | Vice-Admiral - Royal Navy | Sir Michael Culme-Seymour | January 1919-September 1920 | |
| 22 | Rear-Admiral | Rear-Admiral - Royal Navy | Richard Webb | September 1920-September 1922 | |
| 23 | Rear-Admiral | Rear-Admiral - Royal Navy | John D.Kelly | September 1922-August 1923 | |
| 24 | Rear-Admiral | Rear-Admiral - Royal Navy | Hugh D. R. Watson | August 1923-April 1925 | |
| 25 | Vice-Admiral | Vice-Admiral - Royal Navy | Sir Michael H. Hodges | April 1925-May 1927 | |
| 26 | Vice-Admiral | Vice-Admiral - Royal Navy | Sir John D.Kelly | May 1927-April 1929 | |
| 27 | Vice-Admiral | Vice-Admiral - Royal Navy | W. A. Howard Kelly | April 1929-October 1930 | |
| 28 | Vice-Admiral | Vice-Admiral - Royal Navy | Sir William W. Fisher | October 1930-April 1932 | |
| 29 | Vice-Admiral | Vice-Admiral - Royal Navy | Sir Roger R.C. Backhouse | April 1932-May 1934 | |
| 30 | Vice-Admiral | Vice-Admiral - Royal Navy | Sir Charles M. Forbes | May 1934-August 1936 | |
| 31 | Vice-Admiral | Vice-Admiral - Royal Navy | Sir Geoffrey Blake | August 1936-July 1937 | |
| 32 | Vice-Admiral | Vice-Admiral - Royal Navy | Sir Andrew B. Cunningham | July 1937-August 1938 | |
| 33 | Vice-Admiral | Vice-Admiral - Royal Navy | Geoffrey Layton | August 1938-November 1939 | |

== Vice-Admiral Commanding, Light Forces and Second-in-Command Mediterranean Fleet ==
Included:

| | Rank | Flag | Name | Term | Notes/Ref |
|---|---|---|---|---|---|
Vice-Admiral Commanding, Light Forces and Second-in-Command Mediterranean Fleet
| 1 | Vice-Admiral | Vice-Admiral - Royal Navy | John C. Tovey | 18 July, 1940 – 23 October, 1940 | |
| 2 | Vice-Admiral | Vice-Admiral - Royal Navy | Henry D. Pridham-Wippell | 24 October, 1940 – 1 April, 1942 | as acting V Adm. |

== Flag Officer, Air and Second-in-Command, Mediterranean Fleet ==
Included:

| | Rank | Flag | Name | Term | Notes/Ref |
|---|---|---|---|---|---|
Flag Officer, Air and Second-in-Command, Mediterranean Fleet and Vice-Admiral, Commanding 2nd Aircraft Carrier Squadron
| 1 | Vice-Admiral | Vice-Admiral - Royal Navy | Sir Cecil H.J. Harcourt | January 1947 to January 1948 | also VADMCOMM, 2ACSQ |
| 2 | Vice-Admiral | Vice-Admiral - Royal Navy | Sir Thomas H. Troubridge: | January to December 1948 | ditto |
| 3 | Vice-Admiral | Vice-Admiral - Royal Navy | the Hon. Sir Cyril E. Douglas-Pennant | December 1948 to April 1950 | ditto |
| 4 | Vice-Admiral | Vice-Admiral - Royal Navy | Guy Grantham | April 1950 to November 1951 | ditto |
| 5 | Vice-Admiral | Vice-Admiral - Royal Navy | Ralph A. B. Edwards | November 1951 to December 1951 | ditto |
| 6 | Vice-Admiral | Vice-Admiral - Royal Navy | Ralph A. B. Edwards | December 1951 to December 1952 | 2nd AC Squadron is disbanded |
| 7 | Vice-Admiral | Vice-Admiral - Royal Navy | William W. Davis | December 1952 to February 1954 | |
| 8 | Vice-Admiral | Vice-Admiral - Royal Navy | J. Peter L. Reid | February 1954 to August 1955 | |
| 9 | Vice-Admiral | Vice-Admiral - Royal Navy | Maxwell Richmond | August 1955 to October 1956 | |
| 10 | Vice-Admiral | Vice-Admiral - Royal Navy | Sir Robin L.F. Durnford-Slater | October 1956 to 1958 | |

== Composition 2nd Aircraft Carrier Squadron ==
Included:

(United Kingdom) : 2nd Aircraft Carrier Squadron; Mediterranean Fleet 1947 to 1951

| Ship | Dates | Notes/Ref |
|---|---|---|
| HMS Ocean | February 1947 to December 1950 | |
| HMS Triumph | February 1947 to August 1948 | |
| HMS Theseus | June 1947 to August 1948 | |
| HMS Glory | December 1949 to December 1950 | |

== Sources ==
- Cook, Chris (2012). The Routledge Guide to British Political Archives: Sources since 1945. Cambridge, England: Routledge. ISBN 9781136509629.
- Grove, Eric J. (1987). Vanguard to Trident : British naval policy since World War II: Second Aircraft Carrier Squadron visits Mediterranean ports February 1948. Annapolis, Md.: Naval Institute Press. ISBN 9780870215520.
- Mackie, Colin. "Royal Navy Senior Appointments from 1865" (PDF). gulabin.com. Gordon Mackie, July-September 2018.
- Watson, Dr Graham. "Royal Navy Organisation and Ship Deployment 1947-2013". www.naval-history.net. Gordon Smith, 12 July 2015.
