= Robert More-Molyneux =

Royal Navy Admiral (1838–1904)

Admiral Sir Robert More-Molyneux GCB
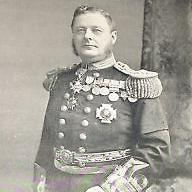
- Sir Robert More-Molyneux
- Born: 7 August 1838
- Died: 29 February 1904 (aged 65); Cairo, Egypt
- Military career
- Allegiance: United Kingdom
- Branch: Royal Navy
- Service years: 1852–1903
- Rank: Admiral
- Commands: HMS St Vincent; HMS Ruby; HMS Invincible; Royal Naval College, Greenwich
- Conflicts: Crimean War; Russo-Turkish War; Anglo-Egyptian War
- Awards: Knight Grand Cross of the Order of the Bath

Admiral Sir Robert Henry More-Molyneux, GCB (7 August 1838 – 29 February 1904) was a Royal Navy officer who became President of the Royal Naval College, Greenwich.

== Naval career ==
After an education at Windlesham House School, More-Molyneux joined the Royal Navy in 1852 and served in the Black Sea during the Crimean War. He became Commanding Officer of the training ship HMS St Vincent in 1869, Commanding Officer of the corvette HMS Ruby in 1877 (in which he served during the Russo-Turkish War) and then Commanding Officer of the battleship HMS Invincible, flagship of Vice Admiral Sir Beauchamp Seymour, in 1880.

After commanding the Invincible during the bombardment of Alexandria in 1882 during the Anglo-Egyptian War, he went on to be commodore commanding the ships in the Red Sea in 1884, captain-superintendent of Sheerness Dockyard in 1886 and admiral-superintendent at Devonport in 1891. After that he became President of the Royal Naval College, Greenwich in 1900 before retiring in 1903.

He was promoted to a Knight Grand Cross of the Order of the Bath (GCB) in the November 1902 Birthday Honours list, and invested with the insignia by King Edward VII at Buckingham Palace on 18 December 1902.

== Family ==
In 1874, he married Annie Mary Carew, daughter of Captain Matthew Charles Forster, R.N.; she died in 1898, leaving a daughter, Gwendolen.

Military offices
Preceded by Sir Richard Tracey	President, Royal Naval College, Greenwich; 1900–1903	Succeeded by Sir Robert Harris
