= Commander-in-Chief, Levant =

Former British Royal Navy Station

- Active: 1943-late 1940s
- Country: United Kingdom
- Allegiance: British Empire
- Branch: Royal Navy
- Part of: Mediterranean Fleet
- Garrison/HQ: HMS Nile, Alexandria, Egypt, (1943-1946); HMS Stag and HMS Osiris (1948-1950ish)

The Commander-in-Chief, Levant was a senior administrative shore commander of the Royal Navy. The post was established in February 1943 when the British Chiefs of Staff Committee ordered the Mediterranean Fleet to be divided into two commands. One was responsible for naval operations involving ships, and the other, administrative and support, was responsible for shore establishments. His subordinate establishments and staff were sometimes informally known as the Levant Command or Levant Station. In December 1943 the title was changed to Flag Officer, Levant and East Mediterranean. In January 1944 the two separate commands were re-unified into a single command merging back into Commander-in-Chief Mediterranean Fleet.

== History ==
Shore-based naval area commands in the Mediterranean and Middle East theatre had historically reported to the Commander-in-Chief Mediterranean Fleet.

"A Flag Officer (Liaison), Rear-Admiral F. Elliott, had been appointed to co-ordinate matters of local defence [of Alexandria], and he was already the Fortress Commander in all but name. In war he was to be responsible to the General Officer Commanding British Troops in Egypt for the security of the Fortress, but was to meet the requirements of the Commander-in-Chief, Mediterranean, in every possible way."

In 1940, responsibility for the Red Sea area was transferred from the Commander-in-Chief, East Indies to the Mediterranean Fleet and did not revert until 1942. Following a meeting in London, the Chiefs of Staff Committee signaled on 2 February 1943 to Admiral Sir Andrew Cunningham, Commander-in-Chief, Mediterranean, that:

1). The Mediterranean will be divided into two commands:(a) the area to the west line A to B to be the Mediterranean command. (b) the area to the East of the above line to be the Levant command which will include the Red Sea. 2). For the present the line A to B will be the line running from the Tunisian/Tripolitanian border to a position in Latitude 35 degrees North, Longitude 60 degrees East, thence to Cape Spartivento (Italy).

Between 1943 and 1945 the shore commands reporting to C-in-C Levant were Tunisia (1943), North Africa (1943-1944), Sicily (July–September 1943); Taranto (September 1943 - May 1945), FO West Italy (September 1943 - October 1944), Northern Mediterranean (October 1944), and Western Mediterranean (January 1943 - January 1944) & (July 1944 - 1945). The dockyards at Gibraltar and Malta continued as major bases supporting the new organisation. In December 1943 the command was renamed to Levant and Eastern Mediterranean.

In August 1946 the command was retitled the Flag Officer, Middle East, part of the tri-service British Middle East Command, until 1959.

== Commanders in Chief ==
	Rank	Flag	Name	Post Name	Term	Notes/Ref
1	Vice-Admiral	Vice-Admiral - Royal Navy	Vice Admiral Sir Henry Harwood	Commander-in-Chief, Levant	February – 5 June 1943	
2	Admiral	Admiral - Royal Navy	Sir John Cunningham	Commander-in-Chief, Levant	5 June 1943 – August 1943	
3	Vice-Admiral	Vice-Admiral - Royal Navy	Vice Admiral Sir Algernon Willis	Commander-in-Chief, Levant	14 October – December, 1943	
4	Vice-Admiral	Vice-Admiral - Royal Navy	Sir Bernard Rawlings	Flag Officer, Levant and East Mediterranean	28 December 1943 – -October 1944	From January 1944 FOLEM was responsible to C-in-C Mediterranean.
5	Vice-Admiral	Vice-Admiral - Royal Navy	Sir William G. Tennant	Flag Officer Levant and East Mediterranean	October 1944 - August 1946	

== Sub-commands, 1943 to 1946 ==
=== Flag Officer, North Africa ===
	Rank	Flag	Name	Term	Notes/Ref
Flag Officer, North Africa
1	Rear Admiral	Rear-Admiral - Royal Navy	Geoffrey Watkins	12 May – December, 1943	retired

=== Flag Officer, Northern Area, Mediterranean ===
	Rank	Flag	Name	Term	Notes/Ref
Flag Officer, Northern Area, Mediterranean
1	Rear Admiral	Rear-Admiral - Royal Navy	John A. V. Morse	25 October 1944 – August, 1945	

=== Flag Officer, Sicily ===
	Rank	Flag	Name	Term	Notes/Ref
Flag Officer, Sicily
1	Rear Admiral	Rear-Admiral - Royal Navy	Rhoderick McGrigor	13 July – September, 1943	

=== Flag Officer, Taranto Area ===
	Rank	Flag	Name	Term	Notes/Ref
Flag Officer, Taranto and Adriatic
1	Rear Admiral	Rear-Admiral - Royal Navy	Arthur Peters	13 September – 15 November 1943	and liaison Italy
2	Rear Admiral	Rear-Admiral - Royal Navy	Rhoderick McGrigor	15 November 1943	ditto

=== Flag Officer, Tunisia ===
	Rank	Flag	Name	Term	Notes/Ref
Flag Officer, Tunisia
1	Admiral	Admiral - Royal Navy	Sir Gerald C. Dickens	12 May – December, 1943	retired

=== Flag Officer, Western Italy ===
	Rank	Flag	Name	Term	Notes/Ref
Flag Officer, Western Italy
1	Rear Admiral	Rear-Admiral - Royal Navy	John A. V. Morse	30 July – August, 1943	

=== Flag Officer, Western Mediterranean ===
	Rank	Flag	Name	Term	Notes/Ref
Flag Officer, Western Mediterranean
1	Rear Admiral	Rear-Admiral - Royal Navy	Charles Morgan	October 1943 - January, 1944	

=== Rear-Admiral, Alexandria ===
The Commander, Levant Area, was responsible to the Rear-Admiral, Alexandria.

== Sources ==
- Cook, Chris (2006). The Routledge Guide to British Political Archives: Sources Since 1945. Cambridge, England: Routledge. ISBN
- Grehan, John; Mace, Martin (2014). "Introduction". The War at Sea in the Mediterranean 1940–1944. Barnsley, England: Pen and Sword. ISBN 9781473837140.
- Mackie, Colin. (2018) "Royal Navy Senior Appointments from 1865" (PDF). gulabin.com. C. Mackie.
- Peterson, J. E. (2016). Defending Arabia. Cambridge, England: Routledge. ISBN 9781317229995.
- Roberts, John (2009). Safeguarding the Nation: The Story of the Modern Royal Navy. Barnsley, England: Seaforth Publishing. ISBN 9781848320437
- Roskill, S.W. (2004). The war at sea : 1939-1945 : history of the second world war. Uckfield, Eng.: Naval and Military Press. ISBN 9781843428053.
- "The Western Powers and the ME". Middle East Record. The Moshe Dayan Center. 2: 90. 1961.
- (Viscount), Andrew Browne Cunningham Cunningham of Hyndhope (2006). The Cunningham Papers: Selections from the Private and Official Correspondence of Admiral of the Fleet Viscount Cunningham of Hyndhope. Farnham, England: Ashgate Publishing, Ltd. ISBN 9780754655985.
- Watson, Dr Graham. "Royal Navy Organization in World War 2, 1939-1945". naval-history.net. G. Smith, 19 September 2015.
