= Cruiser Squadron =

- Active: 1899–1905
- Country: United Kingdom
- Allegiance: British Empire
- Branch: Royal Navy

Commanders
- Notable commanders: Commodore Edmund S. Poë

The Cruiser Squadron was a naval formation of the British Home Fleet consisting of Armored cruisers of the Royal Navy from 1899 to 1905.

== History ==
In October 1899 the Royal Navy's Training Squadron consisting mainly of sailing ships was abolished. On the 30 October the Cruiser Squadron was formed using more modern armoured cruisers. Commodore Edmund S. Poë was appointed its first commander. The squadron was assigned to the Home Fleet and existed until 1905. .

== Commodore and Rear-Admirals commanding ==
Post holders included:

	Rank	Flag	Name	Term
Commodore/Rear-Admiral Commanding, Cruiser Squadron
1	Commodore 2nd Class		Edmund S. Poë	31 October 1899 - 5 October 1900
2	Commodore 2nd Class		Alfred L. Winsloe	5 October 1900 –15 November 1902
3	Rear-Admiral	Rear-Admiral - Royal Navy	Sir Wilmot H. Fawkes	15 November 1902 - November 1904
4	Rear-Admiral	Rear-Admiral - Royal Navy	Edmund S. Poë	November 1904-July 1905
