= Eastern Mediterranean Squadron =

- Active: 1914–1919
- Country: United Kingdom
- Branch: Royal Navy
- Part of: Mediterranean Fleet (1914-1919)
- Garrison/HQ: Mudros 1914-1919; Salonika 1917-1919

The Eastern Mediterranean Squadron later known as the British Aegean Squadron was a naval formation of the Mediterranean Fleet based at Mudros from 1914 to 1916. It then alternated between Mudros on the island of Lemnos and Salonika from 1917 to 1919.

== History ==
The Eastern Mediterranean Squadron was established in September 1914 as a sub-command of the Mediterranean Fleet.

It was heavily involved in the Naval operations in the Dardanelles campaign, 1915. Vice Admiral Carden directed operations from 19 February 1915 until early March. That day the Commander-in-Chief, Eastern Mediterranean had under his orders the Chief of Staff, East Mediterranean; the Second in Command, Eastern Mediterranean; and the Senior Naval Officer, Mudros. On 19 February, two destroyers were sent in to probe the straits and the first shot was fired from Kumkale by the 240 mm (9.4 in) Krupp guns of the Orhaniye Tepe battery at 07:58. The battleships HMS Cornwallis and Vengeance moved in to engage the forts and Cornwallis opened fire at 09:51. The effect of the long-range bombardment was considered disappointing and that it would take direct hits on guns to knock them out. With limited ammunition, indirect fire was insufficient and direct fire would need the ships to be anchored to make stable gun platforms. Ottoman casualties were reported as several men killed on the European shore and three men at Orkanie.

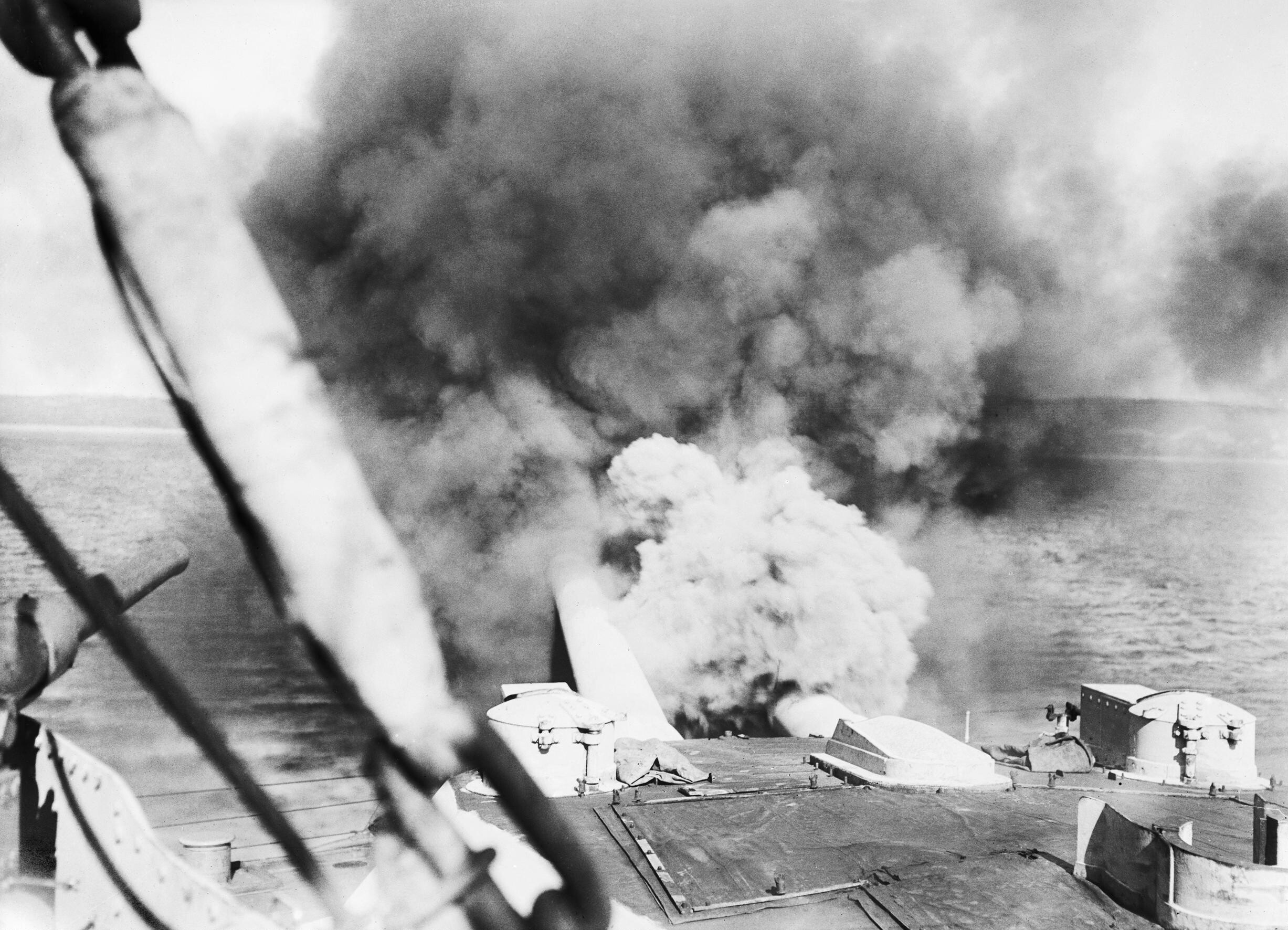
HMS Canopus fires a salvo from her 12 in (305 mm) guns against Ottoman forts in the Dardanelles.

On 25 February the Allies attacked again, the Ottomans evacuated the outer defences, and the fleet entered the straits to engage the intermediate defences. Demolition parties of Royal Marines raided the Sedd el Bahr and Kum Kale forts, meeting little opposition. On 1 March, four battleships bombarded the intermediate defences but little progress was made clearing the minefields. The minesweepers, commanded by the chief of staff, Roger Keyes, were un-armoured trawlers manned by their civilian crews, who were unwilling to work while under fire. The strong current in the straits further hampered minesweeping and strengthened Ottoman resolve which had wavered at the start of the offensive; on 4 March, twenty-three marines were killed raiding the outer defences.

Queen Elizabeth was called on to engage the inner defences, at first from the Aegean coast near Gaba Tepe, firing across the peninsula and later in the straits. On the night of 13 March, the cruiser HMS Amethyst led six minesweepers in an attempt to clear the mines. Four of the trawlers were hit and Amethyst was badly damaged with nineteen stokers killed from one hit. On 15 March, the Admiralty accepted a plan by Carden for another attack by daylight, with the minesweepers protected by the fleet. Carden was taken ill the same day and was replaced by Rear Admiral John de Robeck. A gunnery officer noted in his diary that de Robeck had already expressed misgivings about silencing the Ottoman guns by naval bombardment and that this view was widely held on board the ship.

The post was also styled as Commander-in-Chief, Eastern Mediterranean Squadron.

On 31 August 1915 Commodore Maurice S. FitzMaurice became Principal Naval Transport Officer, Mudros. From 20 January 1916 to June 1916 Fitzmaurice carried out the same duties from Salonika.

In August 1917 the squadron was redesignated the British Aegean Squadron. It was gradually disbanded from May to September 1919.

== Vice-Admirals Commanding, Eastern Mediterranean Squadron ==
Post holders included:

	Rank	Flag	Name	Term
Vice-Admiral Commanding, Eastern Mediterranean Squadron
1	Vice-Admiral	Vice-Admiral - Royal Navy	Sackville Carden	20 September 1914 - 17 March 1915
2	Acting Vice-Admiral	Vice-Admiral - Royal Navy	John de Robeck	17 March 1915 – 19 June 1916
3	Vice-Admiral	Vice-Admiral - Royal Navy	Sir Cecil Thursby	19 June 1916 – 25 Aug, 1917

== Chief of Staff ==
Post holders included:

	Rank	Flag	Name	Term
Chief of Staff, Eastern Mediterranean Squadron
1	Commodore		Roger J. B. Keys	February, 1915 - 19 June 1916

== Rear-Admirals, Second-in-Command ==
Post holders included:

	Rank	Flag	Name	Term
Rear-Admiral, Second-in-Command, Eastern Mediterranean Squadron
1	Rear-Admiral	Rear-Admiral - Royal Navy	Cecil Thursby	March - June 1915
2	Rear-Admiral	Rear-Admiral - Royal Navy	Stuart Nicholson	June 1915 – July, 1915
3	Rear-Admiral	Rear-Admiral - Royal Navy	Arthur Christian	July, 1915 – February, 1916
4	Rear-Admiral	Rear-Admiral - Royal Navy	Sydney Fremantle	February, 1916 – 27 July 1916
5	Rear-Admiral	Rear-Admiral - Royal Navy	Arthur Hayes-Sadler	27 July 1916 – 25 August 1917

=== Senior Naval Officer, Mudros ===
Post holders included:

	Rank	Flag	Name	Term
Senior Naval Officer, Mudros
1	Rear-Admiral	Rear-Admiral - Royal Navy	Rosslyn Wemyss	March - November 1915
2	Rear-Admiral	Rear-Admiral - Royal Navy	Arthur Christian	November 1915 – August 1917

== Rear-Admirals, Commanding British Aegean Squadron ==
Post holders included:

	Rank	Flag	Name	Term
Rear-Admiral Commanding, British Aegean Squadron
1	Rear-Admiral	Rear-Admiral - Royal Navy	Sydney Fremantle	25 August 1917 – 2 January 1918
2	Rear-Admiral	Rear-Admiral - Royal Navy	Arthur Hayes-Sadler	2 January - 2 February 1918
3	Rear-Admiral	Rear-Admiral - Royal Navy	Cecil Lambert	2 February 1918 - May 1919
4	Rear-Admiral	Rear-Admiral - Royal Navy	Michael Culme-Seymour	May - September 1919

=== Captain of Base, Mudros ===
Included:

	Rank	Insig	Name	Term	Notes/Ref
Captain of Base, Mudros
1	Captain		Claude A. Rombulow-Pearse	12 November 1918 – 13 January 1919	
1	Captain		Bertram S. Evans	13 January 1919	died in post
2	Captain		Michael H. Wilding	1 March 1919 – 4 October 1920	

=== Divisional Transport Officer, Salonika ===
Included:

	Rank	Insig	Name	Term	Notes/Ref
Divisional Transport Officer, Salonika
1	Captain		Francis E. Travers	26 January 1917 – 16 January 1918	retired
2	Commander		William Mellor	4 August 1917 – 29 January 1918	
3	Commander		Michael H. Wilding	9 January 1918 – 16 April 1919	retired
