= Assheton Curzon-Howe =

Royal Navy Admiral (1850–1911)

Admiral The Honourable Sir Assheton Curzon-Howe GCVO KCB CMG
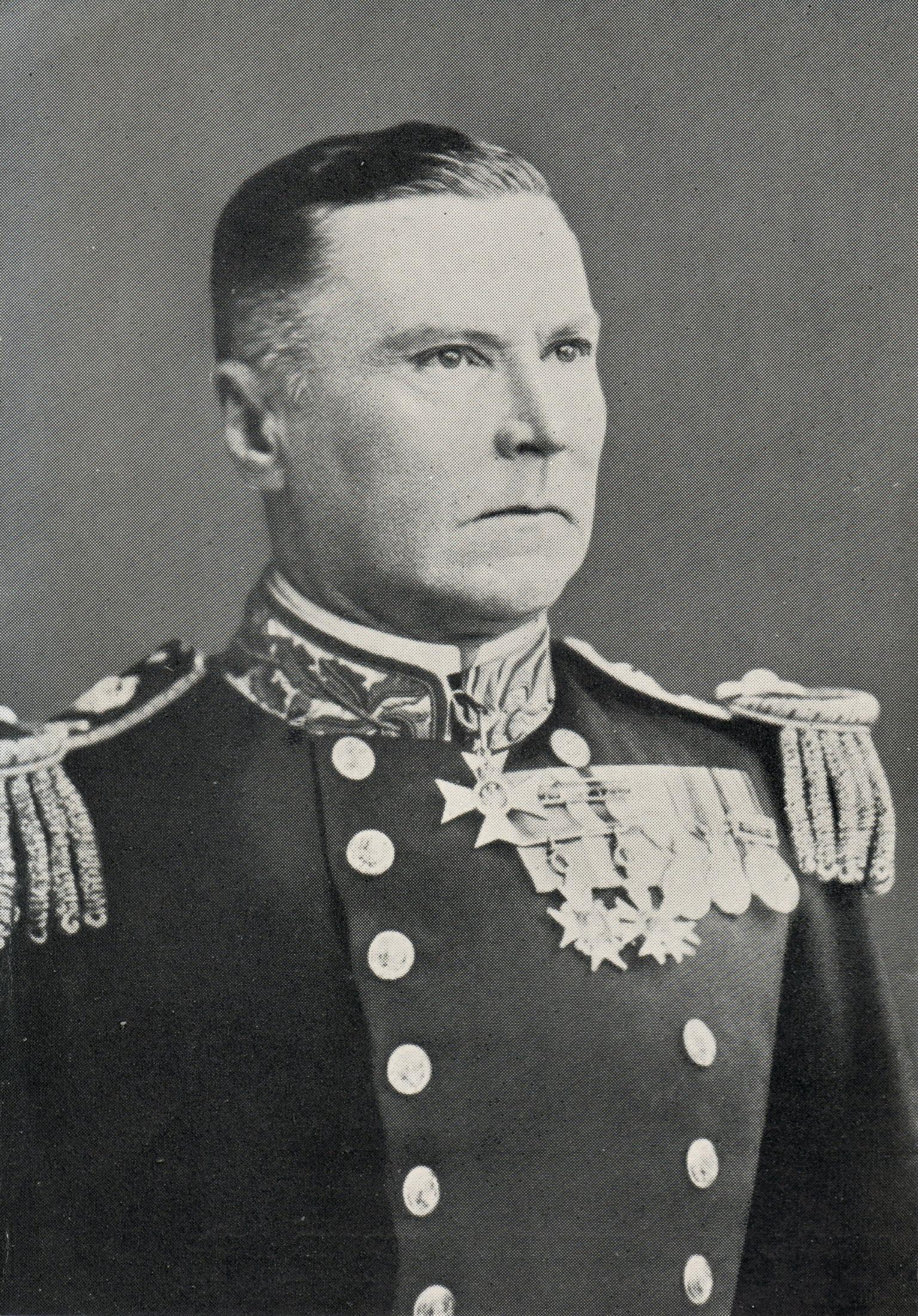
- Born: 10 August 1850
- Died: 1 March 1911 (aged 60)
- Spouse: Alice Anne Cowell (m. 1892)
- Relatives: Richard Curzon-Howe, 1st Earl Howe (father)
- Military career
- Allegiance: United Kingdom
- Branch: Royal Navy
- Service years: c. 1865 – 1911
- Rank: Admiral
- Commands: Atlantic Fleet; Mediterranean Fleet; Portsmouth Command
- Awards: Knight Grand Cross of the Royal Victorian Order; Knight Commander of the Order of the Bath; Companion of the Order of St Michael and St George

Admiral Sir Assheton Gore Curzon-Howe GCVO KCB CMG (10 August 1850 – 1 March 1911) was a British naval officer who served as Commander-in-Chief of the Mediterranean Fleet from 1908 to 1910.

== Early life ==
Curzon-Howe was the thirteenth and youngest child of Richard Curzon-Howe, 1st Earl Howe, and his second wife Anne Gore (died 1877), daughter of Vice-Admiral Sir John Gore. His paternal great-grandfather was Admiral Richard Howe, 1st Earl Howe.

== Career ==
In 1894 Curzon-Howe flew his flag as Commodore on the corvette HMS Cleopatra on the North America and West Indies Station. By January 1900 he had been promoted captain, and was appointed in command of the battleship HMS Ocean when she was commissioned 20 February 1900 for service on the Mediterranean Station. She transferred to the China Station in January 1901, in response to the Boxer Rebellion.

Curzon-Howe was appointed a Naval Aide de Camp (ADC) to Queen Victoria in July 1899, and was re-appointed as a Naval Aide de Camp to her successor King Edward VII in February 1901. He was promoted to flag rank as rear admiral in July 1901, which ended the appointment as Naval ADC.

On 5 June 1902 he was appointed second-in-command of the Channel Squadron, and temporarily hoisted his flag on board HMS Cambridge, gunnery ship at Devonport, before he transferred to the battleship HMS Magnificent later the same month. Shortly before his departure from London he was received in audience by King Edward VII. With Magnificent, he took part in the fleet review held at Spithead on 16 August 1902 for the coronation of King Edward VII, and visited the Aegean Sea for combined manoeuvres with the Mediterranean Fleet the following month. Later the same year he was appointed a Commander of the Royal Victorian Order (CVO) in the November 1902 Birthday Honours list, and was invested with the insignia by King Edward VII at Buckingham Palace on 18 December 1902.

He was flying his flag in HMS Caesar (Captain Sydney Fremantle) in 1906. In 1907, he was Commander-in-Chief of the Atlantic Fleet. Curzon-Howe the served as Commander-in-Chief of the Mediterranean Fleet from 1908 to 1910. He was promoted to Admiral in 1909. He was Commander-in-Chief, Portsmouth, from 1 May 1910 until his death, age 60, on 1 March 1911. During this time he flew his flag in HMS Victory.

== Family ==
On 25 February 1892, at the age of 41, Assheton married Alice Anne Cowell, daughter of General Rt. Hon. Sir John Cowell. They had five children:

- Captain Leicester Charles Assheton St. John Curzon-Howe (8 July 1894 – 21 February 1941), the father of Anne Rita Curzon-Howe, who married Captain Christopher Roper-Curzon, 19th Baron Teynham.
- Victoria Alexandrina Alice Curzon-Howe (1 September 1896 – 3 February 1910)
- Assheton Penn Curzon-Howe-Herrick (21 August 1898 – 23 February 1959)
- Joyce Mary Curzon-Howe (16 July 1906 – 24 September 1997)
- Elizabeth Anne Curzon-Howe (15 November 1909 – ?)

His wife Alice died on 5 November 1948.

Assheton's elder sister, Lady Mary Curzon (1848–1929), was the great-great-grandmother of Diana, Princess of Wales.

== Footnotes ==
Military offices
Preceded by Sir William May	Commander-in-Chief, Atlantic Fleet; 1907–1908	Succeeded by Prince Louis of Battenberg
Preceded by Sir Charles Drury	Commander-in-Chief, Mediterranean Fleet; 1908–1910	Succeeded by Sir Edmund Poë
Preceded by Sir Arthur Fanshawe	Commander-in-Chief, Portsmouth; 1910–1911	Succeeded by Sir Arthur Moore
