= Admiral Hayes =

Admiral Hayes may refer to:

- John B. Hayes (1924–2001), U.S. Coast Guard admiral
- John Daniel Hayes (1902–1991), U.S. Navy rear admiral
- John Hayes (Royal Navy officer, died 1838) (1767 or 1775–1838), British Royal Navy rear admiral
- John Osler Chattock Hayes (1913–1998), British Royal Navy vice admiral

== See also ==
- Arthur Hayes-Sadler (1865–1952), British Royal Navy admiral
- Ronald J. Hays (1928–2021), U.S. Navy admiral
- Lord John Hay (Royal Navy officer, born 1793) (1793–1851), British Royal Navy rear admiral
- Lord John Hay (Royal Navy officer, born 1827) (1827–1916), British Royal Navy admiral
