= Admiral Fremantle =

Admiral Fremantle may refer to:

- Charles Fremantle (1800–1869), British Royal Navy admiral
- Edmund Fremantle (1836–1929), British Royal Navy admiral
- Sydney Fremantle (1867–1958), British Royal Navy admiral
- Thomas Fremantle (Royal Navy officer) (1765–1819), British Royal Navy vice admiral
