= HMS Lord Nelson (1906) =

Royal Navy pre-dreadnought battleship

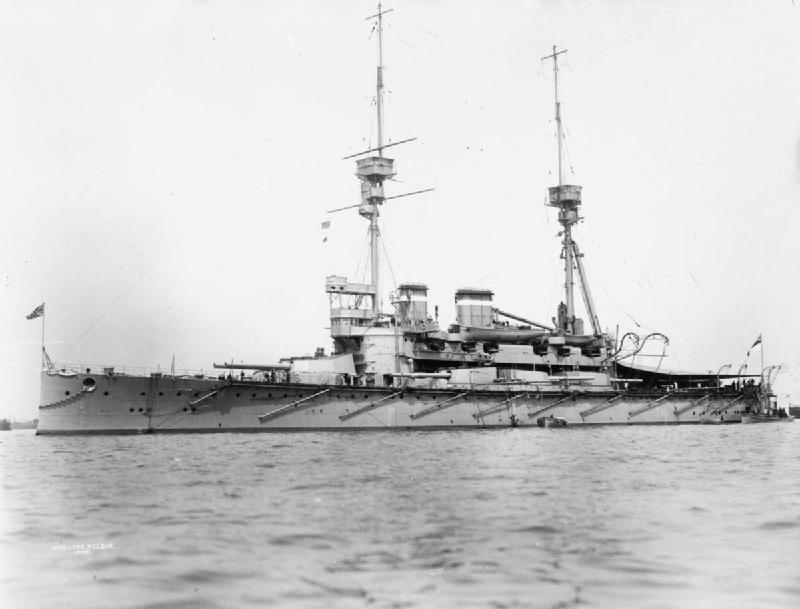
- Lord Nelson

History

United Kingdom
- Name: Lord Nelson
- Builder: Palmers Shipbuilding and Iron Company, Jarrow
- Cost: £1,651,339
- Laid down: 18 May 1905
- Launched: 4 September 1906
- Completed: October 1908
- Commissioned: 1 December 1908
- Decommissioned: May 1919
- Fate: Sold for scrap, 4 June 1920

General characteristics
- Class & type: Lord Nelson-class pre-dreadnought battleship
- Displacement: 15,358 long tons (15,604 t) normal; 16,090 long tons (16,350 t) load; 17,820 long tons (18,110 t) deep
- Length: 443 ft 6 in (135.2 m)
- Beam: 79 ft 6 in (24.2 m)
- Draught: 26 ft 0 in (7.9 m)
- Installed power: 16,750 ihp (12,490 kW); 15 × Babcock & Wilcox water-tube boilers
- Propulsion: 2 × triple-expansion steam engines; 2 × shafts
- Speed: 18 knots (33 km/h; 21 mph)
- Range: 9,180 nmi (17,000 km; 10,560 mi) at 10 knots (19 km/h; 12 mph)
- Complement: Peacetime ca. 750; Wartime 800–817
- Armament: 2 × 2 - 12 in (305 mm) Mk X guns; 4 × 2, 2 × 1 - BL 9.2 in (234 mm) Mk XI guns; 24 × 1 - QF 12-pounder 18 cwt guns; 2 × 1 - 3-pounder guns; 5 × 18 in (457 mm) torpedo tubes
- Armour: Main belt: 12 in (305 mm) amidships, 2–6 in (51–152 mm) forward; Decks: main 1.5 in (38 mm); middle 1–4 in (25–102 mm); lower 3 in (76 mm); 12-inch (305-mm) turrets: 12 in (305 mm); 9.2-inch (234-mm) turrets: 7 in (178 mm); Barbettes: 12 in (305 mm); Bulkhead aft: 8 in (203 mm); Citadel: 8 in (203 mm); Conning tower: 12 in (305 mm)

HMS Lord Nelson was a Lord Nelson-class pre-dreadnought battleship launched in 1906 and completed in 1908. She was the Royal Navy's last pre-dreadnought. The ship was flagship of the Channel Fleet when the First World War began in 1914. Lord Nelson was transferred to the Mediterranean Sea in early 1915 to participate in the Dardanelles campaign. She remained there, becoming flagship of the Eastern Mediterranean Squadron, which was later redesignated the Aegean Squadron. After the Ottoman surrender in 1918 the ship moved to the Black Sea where she remained as flagship before returning to the United Kingdom in May 1919. Lord Nelson was placed into reserve upon her arrival and sold for scrap in June 1920.

== Construction and description ==
HMS Lord Nelson was laid down by Palmers Shipbuilding and Iron Company at Jarrow on 18 May 1905 and launched on 4 September 1906. Her completion was greatly delayed by the diversion of her 12-inch (305 mm) guns and turrets to expedite completion of Dreadnought, and she was not fully completed until October 1908. Although she was not the last pre-dreadnought laid down for the Royal Navy, she was the last one commissioned.

On 8 January 1908, while navigating at South Shields, the ship collided with barquentine Emma Cook, anchored at Mill Dam and damaged her.

Lord Nelson displaced 17,820 long tons (18,106 t) at deep load as built, with a length of 443 feet 6 inches (135.2 m), a beam of 79 feet 6 inches (24.2 m), and a draft of 26 feet (7.9 m). She was powered by two four-cylinder inverted vertical triple-expansion steam engines, which developed a total of 16,750 indicated horsepower (12,490 kW) and gave a maximum speed of 18 knots (33 km/h; 21 mph).

She was armed with four 12-inch guns arranged in two twin gun turrets, one turret each fore and aft. Her secondary armament consisted of ten 9.2-inch (234 mm) guns, eight in twin gun turrets on each corner of the superstructure, and a single gun turret between them. For defence against torpedo boats, Lord Nelson carried twenty-four QF 12-pounder 18 cwt guns and two 3-pounder guns. She also mounted five submerged 18-inch (457 mm) torpedo tubes for which 23 torpedoes were stowed aboard.

== Service history ==
=== Pre-First World War ===
Lord Nelson was first commissioned in reserve on 1 December 1908 at Chatham Dockyard, being attached to the Nore Division of the Home Fleet with a nucleus crew. She first went into full commission on 5 January 1909 to relieve the battleship Magnificent as flagship of the Nore Division, Home Fleet, and in April became part of the First Division, Home Fleet. She was transferred in January 1911 to the Second Division of the Home Fleet, and in May 1912 to the 2nd Battle Squadron. She was temporarily attached in September 1913 to the 4th Battle Squadron. In April 1914, she relieved the battleship Queen as Flagship, Vice Admiral, Channel Fleet.

=== First World War ===
At the outbreak of the World War I in August 1914, Lord Nelson became flagship of the Channel Fleet and was based at Portland. With other ships, she covered the safe transport of the British Expeditionary Force, under the command of Sir John French, to France. On 14 November, she transferred to Sheerness to guard the English coast against the possibility of a German invasion. The ship returned to Portland Harbour on 30 December and patrolled the English Channel until February 1915.

==== Dardanelles campaign, 1915–1916 ====
In February 1915, Lord Nelson was ordered to the Dardanelles to participate in the Dardanelles campaign. She departed Portland on 18 February and joined the British Dardanelles Squadron at Mudros eight days later. She took part in the bombardment of the inner forts and supported the initial landings in early March. The Ottoman Turkish forts engaged her heavily on 7 March and hit her several times, including by a stone cannonball which landed on the deck and was kept as a souvenir by the Flag Officer, Arthur Baker, at Longcross Church; she suffered damage to her superstructure and rigging and was holed by one hit below the waterline which flooded two coal bunkers. After repairs at Malta, the ship returned to take part in the main attack on the Narrows forts on 18 March. Later she bombarded Ottoman field batteries on 6 May prior to the Second Battle of Krithia.

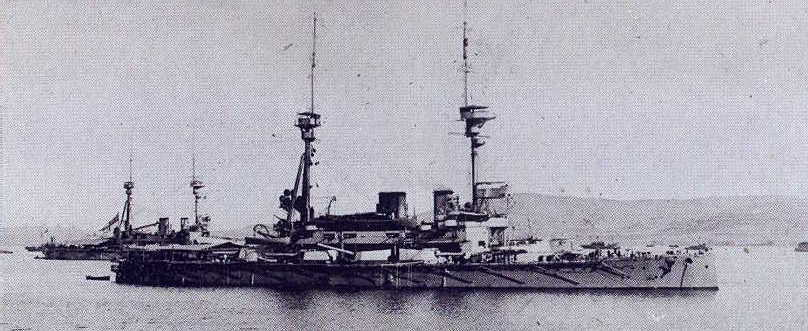
Lord Nelson anchored at the Dardanelles in 1915. Her sister ship Agamemnon is anchored behind her.

Lord Nelson relieved the battleship Queen Elizabeth as flagship of the British Dardanelles Squadron on 12 May, flying the flag of Vice-Admiral Rosslyn Erskine-Wemyss. On 20 June, she bombarded docks and shipping at Gallipoli, aided by the spotting of a kite balloon, and inflicted significant damage. Lord Kitchener made his headquarters aboard her in November and, on 22 December, Lord Nelson hoisted the flag of Vice-Admiral John de Robeck when he succeeded Wemyss.

==== Mediterranean operations, 1916–1918 ====
With the end of the Dardanelles Campaign in January 1916, during which Lord Nelson had suffered no casualties, British naval forces in the area were reorganized and Lord Nelson became flagship of the Eastern Mediterranean Squadron, which was redesignated the Aegean Squadron in August 1917; under either name, the squadron was dispersed throughout the area to protect Allied-held islands, support the British Army at Salonika, and guard against any attempted breakout from the Dardanelles by the German battlecruiser Goeben and light cruiser Breslau. Lord Nelson spent the remainder of the war based at Salonika and Mudros, alternating between the two bases with her sister ship Agamemnon; the ship was based mostly at Salonika, with Agamemnon mostly at Mudros.

According to naval historian Ian Buxton, the most important role of the Royal Navy was to blockade the Dardanelles and thus guard the Eastern Mediterranean against a breakout by Goeben. On 12 January 1918, Rear-Admiral Arthur Hayes-Sadler hoisted his flag aboard Lord Nelson at Mudros as the new commander of the Aegean Squadron. Needing transportation to Salonika for a conference with the British Army commander there, and finding his personal yacht unavailable, Hayes-Sadler opted to have Lord Nelson take him there, and thus she was not present when Goeben and Breslau finally made their breakout attempt on 20 January. The ship could not get back to the Dardanelles in time to participate in the resulting Battle of Imbros or intercept Goeben before she gained shelter in the Dardanelles. Lord Nelson was later given a short refit at Malta in October.

=== Post-war ===
Lord Nelson was part of the British squadron that went to Constantinople in November 1918 following the armistice with the Ottoman Empire, after which she served as flagship in the Black Sea. In April 1919, she conveyed Grand Duke Nicholas and Grand Duke Peter of Russia from the Black Sea to Genoa.

Lord Nelson returned to the United Kingdom in May 1919 and was placed in reserve until August 1919, when she was placed on the sale list. On 4 June 1920, she was sold to Stanlee Shipbreaking Company of Dover. She was resold to Slough Trading Company on 8 November, then again to German scrappers. She was towed to Germany for scrapping in January 1922.
