= Arthur Christian =

Royal Navy Admiral (1863–1926)

Admiral Arthur Christian CB MVO
- Born: 31 August 1863; Lowndes Square, London
- Died: 20 August 1926 (aged 62)
- Military career
- Allegiance: United Kingdom
- Branch: Royal Navy
- Service years: 1876–1919
- Rank: Admiral
- Commands: 7th Cruiser Squadron (1914); HMS Temeraire (1910–11); Royal Naval College, Osborne (1908–10); HMS Duke of Edinburgh (1906–08); HMS Highflyer (1902–03)
- Conflicts: First World War
- Awards: Companion of the Order of the Bath; Member of the Royal Victorian Order

Admiral Arthur Henry Christian, CB, MVO (31 August 1863 – 20 August 1926) was a senior Royal Navy officer.

== Early life ==
Born on 31 August 1863 at 13 Lowndes Square, London, Christian was the fourth son of George Christian and his wife Sarah Mary Christian (née Bainbrigge). He was educated at Twyford School, then an all-boys Private preparatory school.

== Naval career ==
Christian entered the Royal Navy in July 1876. He was promoted to lieutenant on 31 December 1885, to commander on 1 January 1896 "for services on the West and East Coasts of Africa", and to captain on 31 December 1901. In June 1902, he was appointed in command of the protected cruiser HMS Highflyer, and as flag captain to Rear-Admiral Charles Carter Drury on his appointment as Commander-in-Chief of the East Indies Station. With Highflyer he was at Mauritius in August 1902 where the ship took part in local celebrations for the Coronation of King Edward VII and Queen Alexandra, and in November that year visited Colombo. The following February he took her from Bombay to Obbia in Sultanate of Hobyo (in present Somalia).

He was Captain of the Royal Naval College, Osborne, from 16 July 1908 to 5 October 1910.

Christian was appointed Naval Aide-de-Camp to King George V on 30 April 1910 and, on 24 July, was appointed a Member of the Royal Victorian Order. He relinquished the appointment of ADC on 21 August 1911, when he was promoted to rear admiral.

Following the outbreak of the First World War, Christian was appointed to command Southern Force. He was appointed Rear-Admiral, Second-in-Command, Eastern Mediterranean Squadron in July 1915 and, in August, was wounded during the Suvla Bay landings of the Gallipoli Campaign. He was appointed a Companion of the Order of the Bath on 1 January 1916 as part of "honours awarded in recognition of services rendered by Officers of the Eastern Mediterranean Squadron between the time of the landing in the Gallipoli Peninsula in April 1915, and the evacuation in December 1915 – January 1916".

== Personal life ==
In 1911, Christian married Geraldine Diana Monsell. Together they had one son and two daughters. One of his daughters, Mary Diana Christian, was married to General Victor FitzGeorge-Balfour.
