= Chief of Staff Mediterranean Fleet =

Office of the Chief of Staff, Mediterranean Fleet
- Ensign of the Royal Navy
- Navy Department (Ministry of Defence)
- Reports to: Commander-in-Chief Mediterranean Fleet
- Nominator: Secretary of State for Defence
- Appointer: Prime Minister; Subject to formal approval by the Queen-in-Council
- Term length: Not fixed (typically 1–3 years)
- Inaugural holder: Captain Francis C. B. Bridgeman
- Formation: 1893-1967

The Chief of Staff, Mediterranean Fleet, also formally known as Chief of Staff to the Commander-in-Chief Mediterranean Fleet and originally called Flag Captain, Mediterranean Fleet, was a senior British Royal Navy appointment. The appointee was the commander-in-chief's primary aide-de-camp providing administrative support from October 1893 to 1967.

== History ==
The office was created in October 1893. The first incumbent of the office was Captain Francis C. B. Bridgeman. From May 1905 until July 1912, the office holder also held the additional title of Flag Captain, Mediterranean Fleet, or formally Flag Captain to the Commander-in-Chief, Mediterranean Fleet. During a period of restructuring and cost cutting from 1954 and 1971, senior fleet commands were either abolished or merged into fewer but larger commands. As part of continuing cost cutting by the Ministry of Defence in 1967, the Mediterranean Fleet was abolished along with this office. The final office holder was Commodore David B. N. Mellis.

== Chiefs of Staff, Mediterranean Fleet ==
Post holders included:

- Captain Francis C. B. Bridgeman: October 1893-December 1894
- Captain William H. May: January 1895-November 1896
- Captain William des V. Hamilton: November 1896-July 1899
- Captain George F. King-Hall: March 1900-May 1902
- Captain the Hon. Stanley J.C. Colville: May 1902-May 1905
- Captain F.C. Doveton Sturdee: May 1905-March 1907
- Captain Ernest C. T. Troubridge: March 1907-October 1908
- Captain John S. Luard: October 1908-March 1909
- Captain John de M. Hutchison: March 1909-April 1910
- Captain Bernard Currey: April 1910-March 1911
- Captain Stuart Nicholson: March 1911-June 1912
- Commodore Richard F. Phillimore: June 1912-August 1914
- Commodore Rudolf M. Burmester: August 1917-August 1919
- Rear-Admiral William W.Fisher: August 1919-May 1922
- Commodore Barry E. Domvile: May 1922-May 1925
- Rear-Admiral A.Dudley P.R.Pound: May 1925-December 1927
- Rear-Admiral Wilfred Tomkinson: December 1927-May 1928
- Rear-Admiral John K. im Thurn: May 1928-May 1930
- Rear-Admiral William M. James: May 1930-April 1931
- Rear-Admiral Sidney R. Bailey: April 1931-October 1932
- Rear-Admiral Arthur E.F. Bedford: October 1932-June 1934
- Rear-Admiral Robert H. T. Raikes: June 1934-October 1935
- Admiral Sir A.Dudley P.R.Pound: October 1935-May 1936
- Rear-Admiral G. Frederick B. Edward-Collins: May 1936-April 1938
- Rear-Admiral Bruce A. Fraser: April 1938-February 1939
- Rear-Admiral Algernon U. Willis: February 1939-March 1941
- Rear-Admiral John H. Edelsten: March 1941-December 1942
- Commodore John G. L. Dundas: December 1942-February 1943
- Commodore Royer M. Dick: February–November 1943
- Rear-Admiral John G. L. Dundas: November 1943-August 1944
- Rear-Admiral Herbert A. Packer: August 1944-March 1946
- Rear-Admiral Guy Grantham: March 1946-March 1948
- Rear-Admiral H. Geoffrey Norman: March 1948-April 1950
- Commodore Thomas M. Brownrigg: April 1950-May 1952
- Rear-Admiral Manley L. Power: May 1952-November 1953
- Commodore Wilfrid J.W. Woods: November 1953-September 1955
- Commodore Desmond P. Dreyer: September 1955-July 1957
- Rear-Admiral Christopher D. Bonham-Carter: July 1957-May 1959
- Rear-Admiral Joseph C.C. Henley: May 1959-October 1961
- Commodore Patrick U. Bayly: October 1961 – 1963
- Commodore Herbert J. Lee: March 1963-July 1965
- Commodore David B. N. Mellis: July 1965 – 1967

== Sources ==
1. Harley, Simon; Lovell, Tony (9 January 2019). "Mediterranean Station - The Dreadnought Project". www.dreadnoughtproject.org. Harley and Lovell.
2. Mackie, Colin (January 2019). "Chief of Staff, Mediterranean Fleet" (PDF). gulabin.com. C. Mackie. pp. 148–149. Retrieved 1 February 2019.
3. Navy Notes". Royal United Services Institution. Journal. 80 (519): 644–651. 11 September 2009. doi:10.1080/03071843509420903.
4. Smith, Gordon. "Royal Navy Organisation and Ship Deployment 1947-2013: Summary of Fleet Organisation 1972-1981". www.naval-history.net. Gordon Smith.
