= HMS Ramillies (1892) =

Royal Sovereign-class battleship

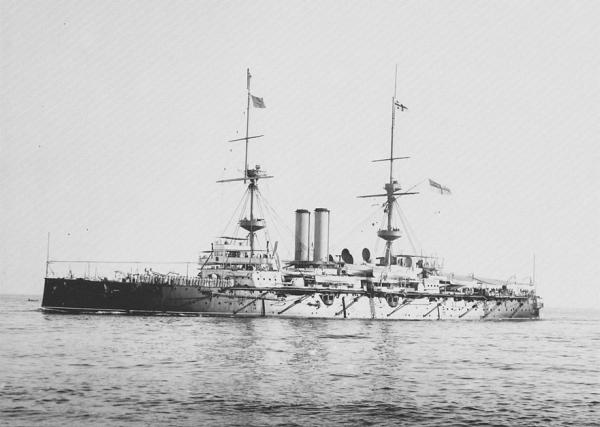
- HMS Ramillies

History

United Kingdom
- Name: HMS Ramillies
- Namesake: Battle of Ramillies
- Builder: J & G Thomson Ltd., Clydebank
- Laid down: 11 August 1890
- Launched: 1 March 1892
- Commissioned: 17 October 1893
- Decommissioned: August 1911
- Fate: Sold for scrapping, 7 October 1913

General characteristics
- Class & type: Royal Sovereign-class pre-dreadnought battleship
- Displacement: 14,190 long tons (14,420 t), 15,580 long tons (15,830 t) full load
- Length: 410 ft 5 in (125.10 m) oa
- Beam: 75 ft (23 m)
- Draught: 27 ft 6 in (8.38 m)
- Propulsion: Twin coal-fired Humphreys & Tennant 3-cylinder triple-expansion steam engines, two screws; 9000ihp
- Speed: 15.7 knots max
- Complement: 712
- Armament: 2 × twin 13.5 in (343 mm) guns; 10 × single 6 in (152 mm) guns; 10 × single 6-pdr (57 mm (2.2 in)) guns; 12 × single 3-pdr (47 mm (1.9 in)) guns; 6 × 18-inch (450 mm) torpedo tubes (4 above water, 2 submerged)
- Armour: Main belt: 14–18 in (356–457 mm); Upper belt: 3–4 in (76–102 mm); Forward Bulkheads: 16 in (406 mm); After bulkhead: 14 in (356 mm); Barbettes: 11–17 in (279–432 mm); Casemates: 6 in (152 mm); Conning Tower: 14 in (356 mm); Deck: 2.5–3 in (64–76 mm)

HMS Ramillies was a Royal Sovereign-class pre-dreadnought battleship of the Royal Navy, named after the Battle of Ramillies. The ship was built by J. & G. Thompson at Clydebank, starting with her keel laying in August 1890. She was launched in March 1892 and commissioned into the Mediterranean Fleet as flagship the following October. She was armed with a main battery of four 13.5-inch guns and a secondary battery of ten 6-inch guns. The ship had a top speed of 16.5 knots.

Ramillies served as flagship of the Mediterranean Fleet up to 1899, and again from 1900 to 1902. After taking part in manoeuvres off the coast of Portugal, she returned to England for a refit in 1903. Upon completion, she was commissioned into the Reserve in 1905. She suffered damage while participating in combined manoeuvres the following year, and was recommissioned into the Special Service Division of the Home Fleet in 1907, becoming the Parent Ship of the 4th Division of the Home Fleet in 1910. She was relieved of that role a year later, before being reduced to material reserve at Devonport in August 1911, and stripped and laid up at Motherbank for disposal in July 1913. She was sold for scrap in October 1913 and towed to Italy to be broken up the following month.

== Design ==
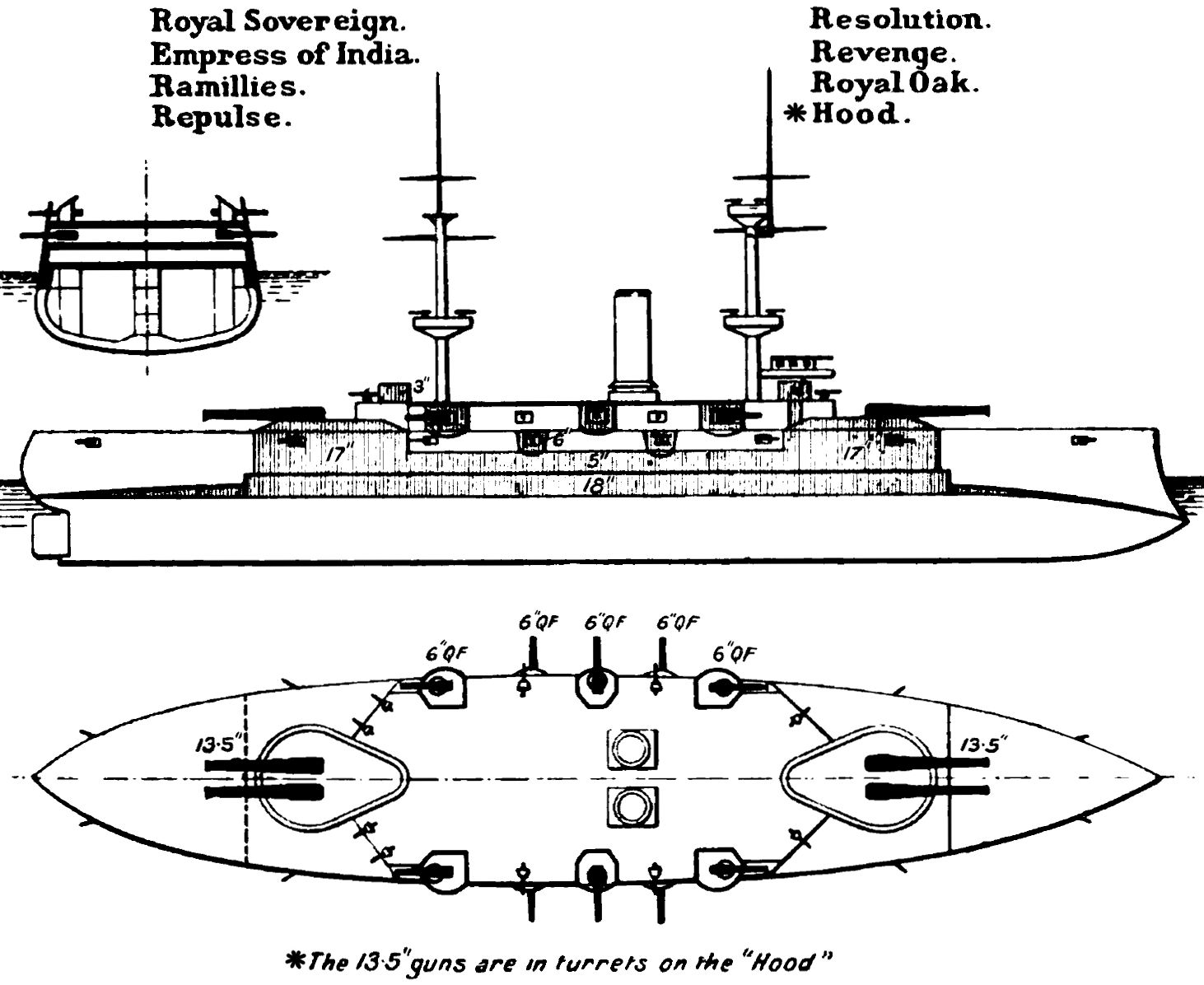
Right elevation and deck plan as depicted in Brassey's Naval Annual 1905.

The Royal Sovereign-class battleships were based on Admiral-class barbette ships, but contained several alterations. The freeboard was raised, the barbettes' armour was extended and an upper belt and secondary armour were added. They could also obtain a higher speed, but were 4,000 tons larger. Ramillies was 410 feet (120 m) long overall and had a beam of 75 ft and a draft of 27 ft 6in. She displaced up to 15,580 tons at her full combat load. Her propulsion system consisted of two 3-cylinder triple expansion engines powered by eight coal-fired cylindrical boilers. With natural draught, her engines provided a top speed of 15.5 knots at 9,000 indicated horsepower; 16.5 knots at 11,000 indicated horsepower could be obtained with forced draught. She had a crew of 712 officers and ratings. When built, ships of the Royal Sovereign class rolled too heavily under certain conditions. Bilge keels were added to compensate for the problem, and the ships "proved to be excellent seaboats quite capable ... of maintaining high speeds in a seaway". The ships were well-constructed and probably the most substantial built for the Royal Navy, even if they "suffered ... from excessive weight and fittings." In the view of R. A. Burt, they were "highly successful; at that time, they were probably unequalled in all-round fighting efficiency."

Ramillies was armed with four breech-loading 13.5-inch guns on two barbettes with armour ranging from 11 to 17 inches in thickness. The ship also carried ten quick-fire (QF) 6-inch guns, four of which were mounted in casemates on the main deck, plus sixteen QF 6-pounder (2.2 in (57 mm)) guns of an unknown type and a dozen QF 3-pounder (1.9 in (47 mm)) Hotchkiss guns. She was also equipped with seven 18-inch torpedo tubes, two of which were submerged. Between 1899 and 1902, the 3-pounder guns were removed from the upper tops; the above-water torpedo tubes were removed in 1902–1905. The remaining 6-inch guns on the upper deck were mounted in 5-inch armoured casemates between 1902 and 1904. All of the armour was supplied by the builders, J. & G. Thompson, of Clydebank. The waterline belt was 252 ft long by 8 ft 8in deep, and its armour varied in thickness between 14 and 18 inches; the bulkheads were protected by 14 to 16 inches of armour. The middle deck covering the belt was 3 inches thick and the lower deck forward and aft of the belt was 2.5 inches thick, while the upper belt between the middle and main decks was coated in 3 to 4 inches of armour. The casemates for the 6-inch guns were protected by an equal thickness of armour and the conning tower was protected with 14 inch armour on the forward side, and 3 inches of armour on the aft. The ship's armoured deck was 2.5 to 3 inches thick.

== Service history ==
Ramillies was built by J. & G. Thompson, of Clydebank, at a cost of £902,600, plus £78,295 for guns. She was laid down on 11 August 1890, launched on 1 March 1892 and completed the following October. She had been constructed at such a small incline that it took nearly an hour and a half to travel down the slipway and into the water (Note: 1 hour and 26 minutes); most of the crowd that had gathered dissipated in the meantime. Ramillies was commissioned at Portsmouth on 17 October 1893 as the Flagship of the Mediterranean Fleet. She departed on 28 October and arrived at Malta on 8 November to relieve the battleship HMS Sans Pareil as acting flagship. Francis C. B. Bridgeman-Simpson was appointed captain of Ramillies on the day of her commission; the commander of the Mediterranean Fleet at the time was Admiral Sir Michael Culme-Seymour. On 9 December 1896, Ramillies was recommissioned at Malta for further service in the Mediterranean Fleet. In July 1899, she became a private ship in the fleet, relieved as flagship by the battleship HMS Renown, but in January 1900 she became the flagship of Rear Admiral Lord Charles Beresford, second-in-command of the Mediterranean Fleet. When Beresford resigned from this position in January 1902, his successor Rear-Admiral Burges Watson took over Ramillies as his flagship until his death in September 1902. In October 1902, she was once again relieved as flagship, this time by the battleship HMS Venerable.

In May 1902, Ramillies was at Palermo to attend festivities in connection with the opening of an agricultural exhibition by King Victor Emmanuel; the King and the Italian Minister of Marine paid her a visit when she arrived in Rome later in the month. She took part in combined manoeuvres off the coast of Portugal in August 1903, but that month she was paid off from Mediterranean service and transferred to the Portsmouth Reserve while she was refitted. Her refit complete, she was commissioned into the reserve at Chatham on 30 January 1905. In April 1905, Ramillies transferred her crew to the battleship HMS London and was recommissioned with a new crew into the Sheerness-Chatham Reserve Division.

On 30 January 1906, she transferred her crew to the battleship HMS Albemarle and recommissioned with yet another crew for service in the Chatham Reserve. In June 1906, she participated in combined manoeuvres of the Atlantic Fleet, Channel Fleet, and Reserve Fleet, but in the process collided with her sister ship HMS Resolution, suffering stern damage. As a result, her propellers were disabled. In November 1906, her crew was transferred once more to the battleship HMS Africa. In March 1907, Ramillies was recommissioned at Devonport with a reduced crew into the Special Service Division of the Home Fleet. In October 1910, she became Parent Ship in the Home Fleet's 4th Division. Her sister ship HMS Royal Oak relieved her of her parent ship duties in June 1911 and she was placed on the material reserve at Devonport in August 1911. She was stripped and laid up ready for disposal in July 1913, before being auctioned off for scrap on 7 October 1913; the buyer, George Cohen, of Swansea, paid £42,300 for her. She was resold to an Italian company, which in November 1913 towed her to Italy to be broken up.

== Captains ==
The following is an incomplete list of captains who commanded Ramillies:

- 17 October 1893: Francis C. B. Bridgeman-Simpson.
- 17 January 1895: William H. May.
- 9 December 1896: William Des V. Hamilton.
- 1 January 1900: Robert S. Lowry.
- 24 January 1902: Hon. Walter George Stopford.
- 16 October 1902: Francis George Kirby.
- 15 March 1905: Robert G. Fraser.
- 13 March 1906: Charles H. Dare, MVO.
- 12 September 1906: Caspar J. Baker.
- 1 February 1908: Hubert Grant-Dalton.
- 2 February 1909: Arthur W. Ewart.

== Bibliography ==
- Burt, R. A. (1988). British Battleships 1889–1904. Annapolis: Naval Institute Press. ISBN 978-0-87021-061-7.
- Gardiner, Robert, ed. (1979). Conway's All the World's Fighting Ships 1860–1905. Greenwich: Conway Maritime Press. ISBN 978-0-8317-0302-8.
