= Arthur Hayes-Sadler =

Royal Navy Admiral (1865–1952)

Admiral Arthur Hayes-Sadler CSI
- Born: 9 October 1865
- Died: 9 February 1952 (aged 86)
- Military career
- Allegiance: United Kingdom
- Branch: Royal Navy
- Service years: 1877–1924
- Rank: Admiral
- Commands: HMS Ocean; Aegean Station
- Conflicts: Anglo-Egyptian War; World War I
- Awards: Companion of the Order of the Star of India

Admiral Arthur Hayes-Sadler, CSI (9 October 1865 – 9 February 1952) was a senior Royal Navy officer during World War I.

== Naval career ==
Born the son Sir James Hayes Sadler KCMG, Arthur Hayes-Sadler joined the Royal Navy in 1877. He took part in the bombardment of Alexandria in 1882 and then served with the Naval Brigade. Promotion to the rank of commander followed on 1 January 1899. In May 1902 he was appointed navigation (N) officer to the pre-dreadnought battleship HMS Resolution, about to become flagship to Rear-Admiral George Atkinson-Willes, Second-in-Command of the Home Fleet during the Coronation Review for King Edward VII. Following the review, he was on 16 September appointed navigation officer to the battleship HMS Empress of India, serving in the Home Fleet. Promoted to captain in 1904, he served in World War I and took charge of Naval Operations in the Persian Gulf between 1914 and 1915. He commanded HMS Ocean which was sunk by a mine at Gallipoli in March 1915 and also took the surrender of the Turks in December 1915. Promoted to rear admiral in July 1915, he was appointed Commander-in-Chief, Aegean Station with his flag in HMS Lord Nelson in August 1916. He retired in 1924.

Hayes-Sadler was elected a Fellow of the Royal Geographical Society (FRGS) in December 1902.
