= William May (Royal Navy officer) =

Royal Navy Admiral of the Fleet (1849–1930)

Admiral of the Fleet Sir William May GCB GCVO DL
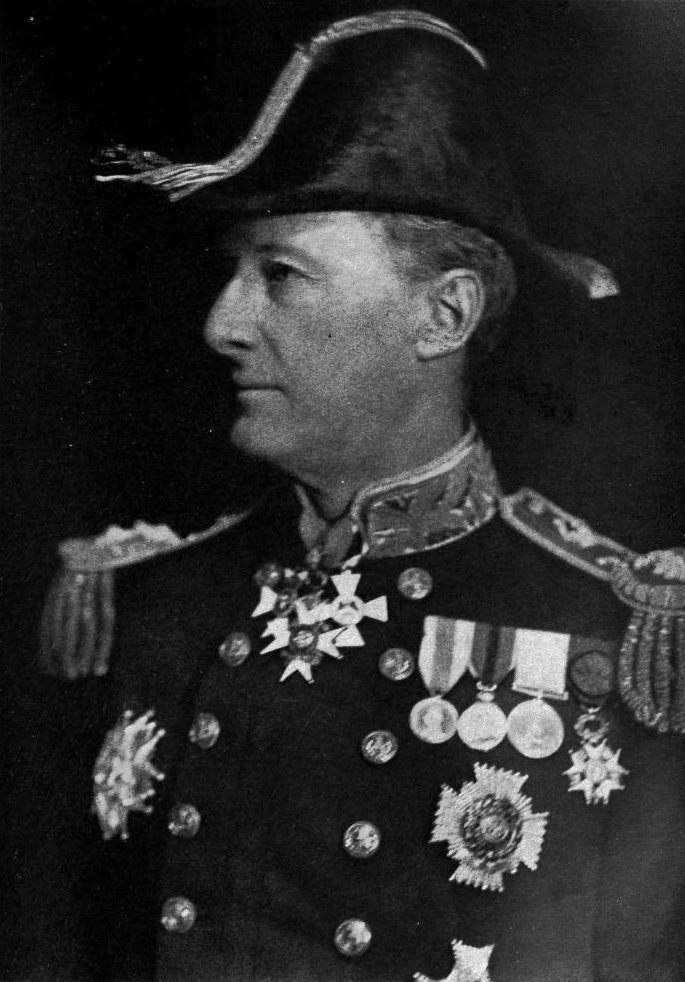
- Sir William May
- Born: 31 July 1849; Liscard, Cheshire
- Died: 7 October 1930 (aged 81); Coldstream, Berwickshire
- Military career
- Allegiance: United Kingdom
- Branch: Royal Navy
- Service years: 1863–1919
- Rank: Admiral of the Fleet
- Commands: HMS Polyphemus; HMS Imperieuse; HMS Ramillies; HMS Excellent; Atlantic Fleet; Home Fleet; Plymouth Command
- Conflicts: World War I
- Awards: Knight Grand Cross of the Order of the Bath; Knight Grand Cross of the Royal Victorian Order

Admiral of the Fleet Sir William Henry May GCB GCVO DL (31 July 1849 – 7 October 1930) was a Royal Navy Officer. As a junior officer he took part an expedition to rescue Commander Albert Markham who had got into difficulty trying to reach the North Pole via Smith Sound, the sea passage between Greenland and Canada's northernmost island, Ellesmere Island.

May went on to higher command and served as Third Sea Lord and Controller of the Navy before becoming Commander-in-Chief, Atlantic Fleet. He held the office of Second Sea Lord and Chief of Naval Personnel and in that capacity threatened to resign if the Liberal Government cut the naval estimates any further. Later he became Commander-in-Chief, Home Fleet, in which capacity he encouraged innovative ways of organising his huge fleet including the deployment of cruising formations, the use of fast squadrons and tactical command at squadron level rather than fleet level, and then became Commander-in-Chief, Plymouth. He served in the First World War purely in an administrative capacity.

== Early career ==
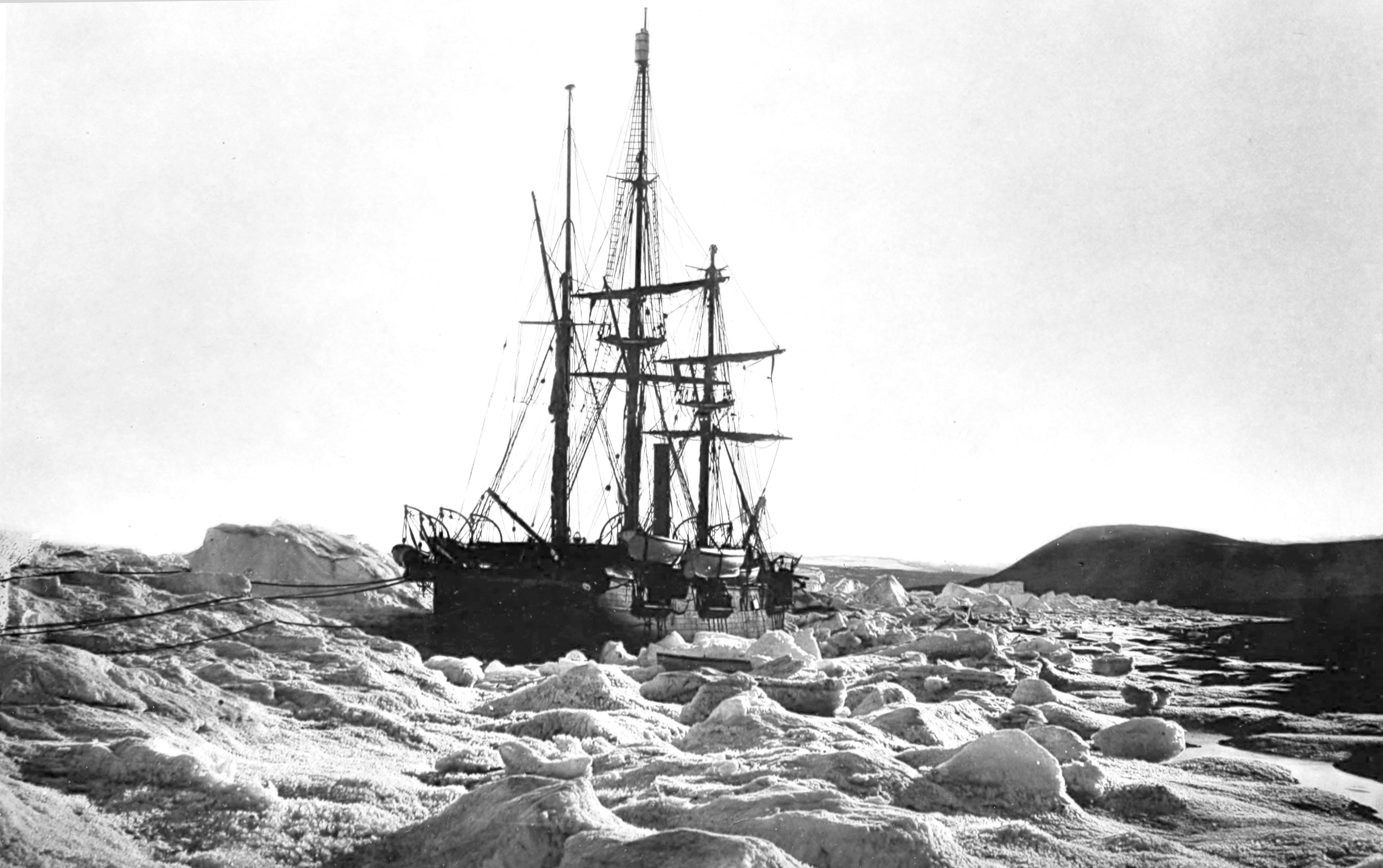
HMS Alert in pack ice during the Arctic Expedition of 1876

Born the son of Job William Seaburne May and Anne Jane May (née Freckleton), May was educated at the Royal Institution School in Liverpool and Eastman's Royal Naval Academy and then joined the Royal Navy as a cadet in the training ship HMS Britannia on 9 June 1863. He joined the first-rate HMS Victoria, flagship of the Mediterranean Fleet in 1864 and, having been promoted to midshipman, he transferred to the frigate HMS Liffey in 1867. Promoted to sub-lieutenant on 29 March 1869, he joined the battleship HMS Hercules in the Channel Fleet and then transferred to the Royal Yacht HMY Victoria and Albert (1855) in June 1871. Promoted to lieutenant on 7 September 1871, he briefly rejoined HMS Hercules in April 1872 before attending the gunnery school HMS Excellent at Portsmouth. He joined the frigate HMS Newcastle at Sheerness in September 1874 and then became navigating officer in the sloop HMS Alert on her Arctic expedition of 1875 and 1876. He took part in an expedition to rescue Commander Albert Markham, who had got into difficulty trying to reach the North Pole via Smith Sound, the sea passage between Greenland and Canada's northernmost island, Ellesmere Island.

May joined the torpedo school HMS Vernon in 1877, where he was involved in the development of the Whitehead torpedo, and then transferred to the frigate HMS Inconstant in the Mediterranean Fleet in 1880. Promoted to commander on 9 March 1881, he became commanding officer of the torpedo ram HMS Polyphemus later that year and then returned to the Royal Yacht HMY Victoria and Albert II, this time as second in command, in 1884. Promoted to captain on 9 May 1887, he became flag captain to the Commander-in-Chief, China Station in the armored cruiser HMS Imperieuse in March 1888. En route to the Far East he took possession of Christmas Island following the recent discovery of phosphate deposits there. He then served successively as naval attaché in Berlin, naval attaché in Paris and naval attaché in Saint Petersburg. He went on to be Assistant Director of Torpedoes at the Admiralty in 1893, flag captain to the Commander-in-Chief, Mediterranean Fleet in the battleship HMS Ramillies in January 1895 and flag captain to the Commander-in-Chief, Portsmouth in early 1897. In the latter role he acted as chief of staff for the Diamond Jubilee Review of the Fleet at Spithead in June 1897 for which he was appointed a Member of the Royal Victorian Order later that year. He then became commanding officer of the gunnery school HMS Excellent later that year and was appointed a naval aide-de-camp to the Queen on 7 May 1899.

== Senior command ==
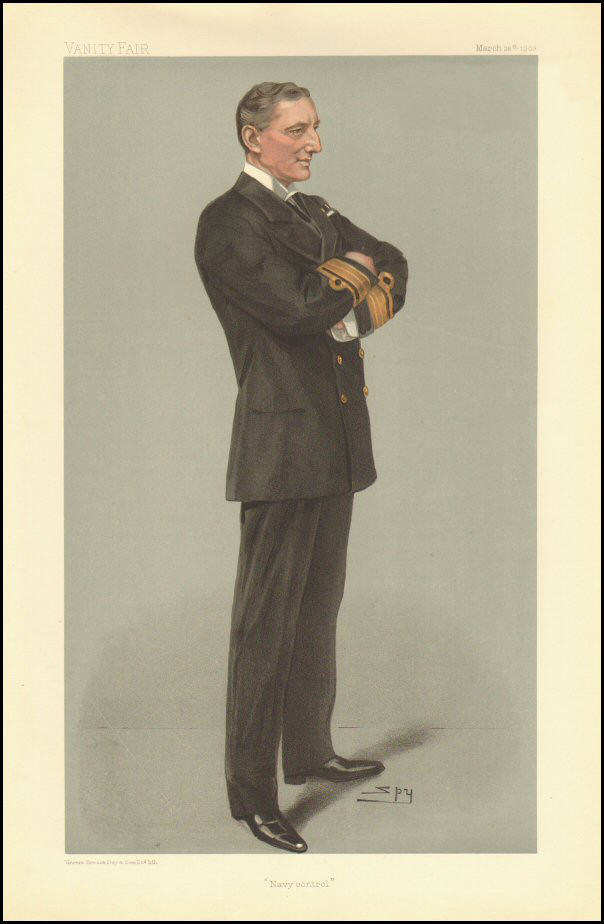
"Navy Control". Caricature by Spy published in Vanity Fair in 1903

May became Director of Naval Ordnance and Torpedoes at the Admiralty in January 1901 and, having been promoted to rear admiral on 28 March 1901, he became Third Naval Lord and Controller of the Navy in April 1901. He was advanced to Knight Commander of the Royal Victorian Order on 30 December 1904. He went on to be Commander-in-Chief, Atlantic Fleet, with his flag in the battleship HMS King Edward VII, in February 1905. Promoted to vice admiral on 29 June 1905, he was appointed a Grand Officer of the French Legion of Honour on 5 September 1905 and a Knight Commander of the Order of the Bath on 29 June 1906.

May became Second Sea Lord and Chief of Naval Personnel in 1907 and in that capacity threatened to resign if the Liberal Government cut the naval estimates any further. In the event he did not have to resign but nevertheless he was cast out of the inner circle of First Sea Lord Sir John Fisher's confidantes.

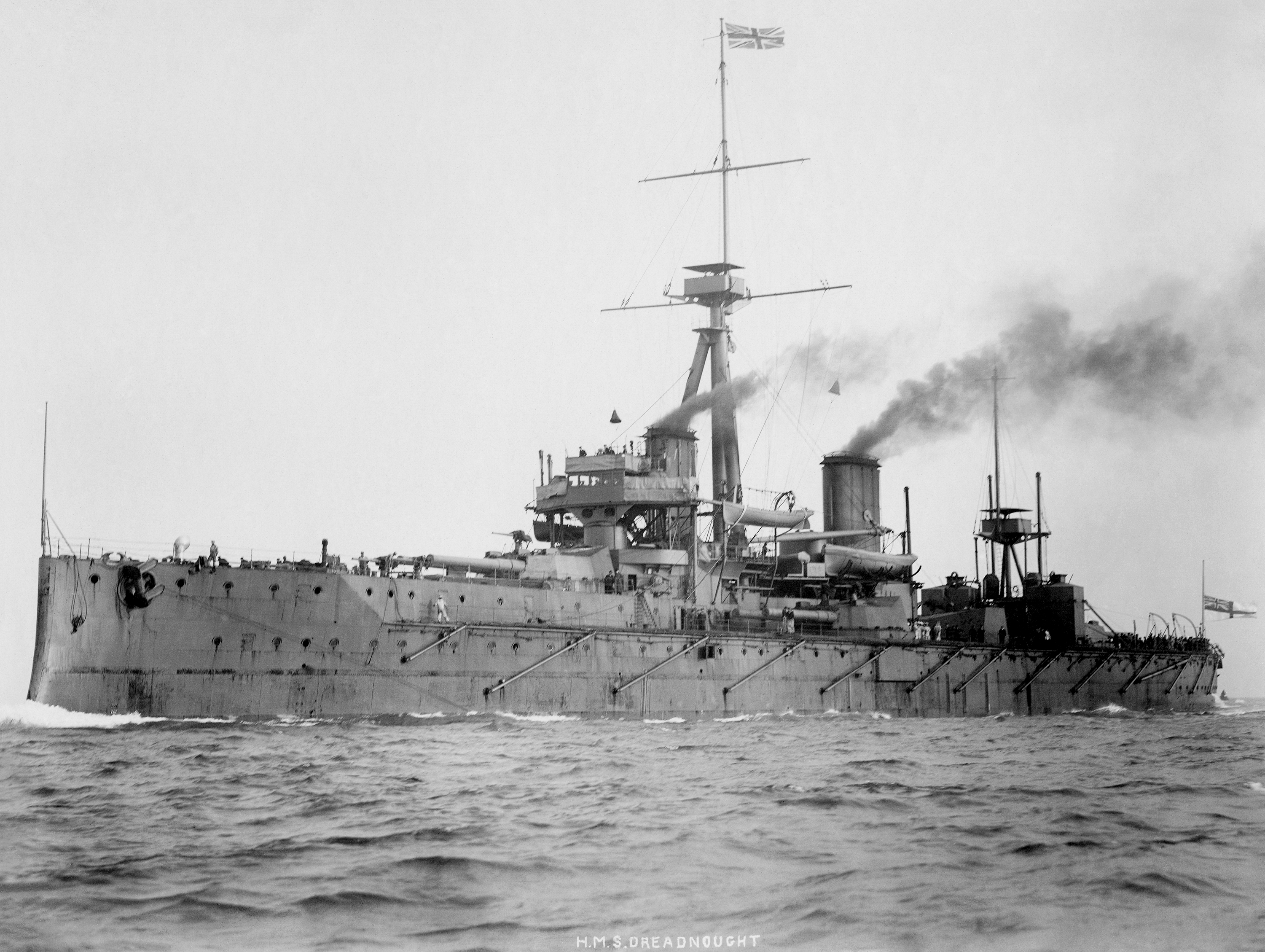
HMS Dreadnought, May's flagship as Commander-in-Chief, Home Fleet

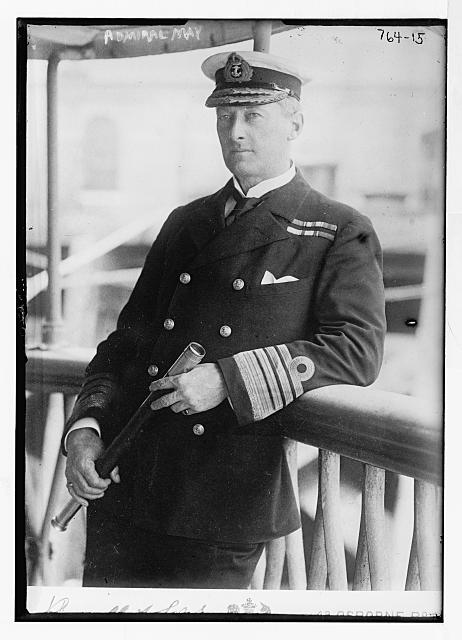
Admiral Sir William May on board a battleship, circa 1910

Promoted to full admiral on 5 November 1908, he became Commander-in-Chief, Home Fleet, with his flag in the battleship HMS Dreadnought, in March 1909. In that capacity he encouraged innovative ways of organising his huge fleet including the deployment of cruising formations, the use of fast squadrons and tactical command at squadron level rather than fleet level. He was advanced to Knight Grand Cross of the Royal Victorian Order on 31 July 1909. He went on to be Commander-in-Chief, Plymouth in April 1911 and was advanced to Knight Grand Cross of the Order of the Bath on 19 June 1911. He was promoted to Admiral of the Fleet on 20 March 1913.

May served in the First World War in an administrative capacity, as a member of the Dardanelles Commission tasked with examining the failure of Gallipoli campaign, as a member of the Reconstruction Committee tasked with considering post-war expenditure reductions and as a member of a fisheries committee. He retired in 1919 and died on 7 October 1930 at his home, Bughtrig House in Coldstream in Berwickshire.

== Family ==
In 1878 May married Kinbarra Marrow: they had two sons.

== Sources ==
- Heathcote, Tony (2002). The British Admirals of the Fleet 1734 – 1995. Pen & Sword Ltd. ISBN 0-85052-835-6.

Military offices
Preceded by Sir Arthur Wilson	Third Naval Lord and Controller of the Navy; 1901–1905	Succeeded by Sir Henry Jackson
Preceded by Lord Charles Beresford	Commander-in-Chief, Atlantic Fleet; 1905–1907	Succeeded by Sir Assheton Curzon-Howe
Preceded by Sir Charles Drury	Second Sea Lord; 1907–1909	Succeeded by Sir Francis Bridgeman
Preceded by Sir Francis Bridgeman	Commander-in-Chief, Home Fleet; 1909–1911	Succeeded by Sir Francis Bridgeman
Preceded by Sir Wilmot Fawkes	Commander-in-Chief, Plymouth; 1911–1913	Succeeded by Sir George Egerton
