= Naval Intelligence Department (United Kingdom) =

Intelligence agency of the British Admiralty

Department overview
- Formed: 1887
- Preceding Department: Foreign Intelligence Committee
- Dissolved: 1912
- Superseding Department: Naval Intelligence Division
- Jurisdiction: Government of the United Kingdom
- Headquarters: Admiralty Building; Whitehall; London
- Parent Department: Admiralty

The Naval Intelligence Department (NID) was the intelligence arm of the British Admiralty from 1887 until 1912 when most of its subsidiary divisions were absorbed during the creation of the Admiralty War Staff department that included a new Naval Intelligence Division that concentrated in that sphere solely. It dealt with intelligence matters concerning British naval plans, and with the collection of naval intelligence in regard to coastal defences, foreign powers, mobilisation, trade and war.

== History ==
The Foreign Intelligence Committee was established in 1882 and it evolved into the Naval Intelligence Department in 1887.

The NID staff were originally responsible for fleet mobilisation and war plans as well as foreign intelligence collection; thus in the beginning there were originally two divisions: (1) intelligence (Foreign) and (2) Mobilisation. In 1900 another division, War, was added to deal with issues of strategy and defence, and in 1902 a fourth division, Trade, was created for matters related to the protection of merchant shipping. The Trade Division was abolished in October 1909 in the wake of the Committee of Imperial Defence inquiry into the feud between the First Sea Lord, Admiral Sir John Fisher and former Commander-in-Chief Channel Fleet, Admiral Lord Charles Beresford, when it was discovered that the captain heading the Trade Division had been supplying the latter with confidential information during the inquiry.

In 1910, the NID was shorn of its responsibility for war planning and strategy when the outgoing Fisher created the Navy War Council as a stop-gap remedy to criticisms emanating from the Beresford Inquiry that the Navy needed a naval staff—a role the NID had been in fact fulfilling since at least 1900, if not earlier. After this reorganisation, war planning and strategic matters were transferred to the newly created Naval Mobilisation Department and the NID reverted to the position it held prior to 1887—an intelligence collection and collation organisation.

In 1912 the department was restructured with most of its divisions and functions being absorbed within the Admiralty War Staff organisation the department was abolished and re-emerged as the Naval Intelligence Division of the new department.

== Directors of Naval Intelligence ==
Directors of Naval Intelligence included:

- Captain William Henry Hall, 1887–1889
- Rear-Admiral Cyprian Bridge, 1889–1894
- Rear-Admiral Lewis Beaumont, 1895–1899
- Rear-Admiral Reginald Custance, 1899–1902
- Rear-Admiral Prince Louis of Battenberg, 1902–1905
- Captain Charles Ottley, 1905–1907
- Rear-Admiral Sir Edmond Slade, 1907–1909
- Rear-Admiral Alexander Bethell, 1909–1912

== Assistant directors ==
Included:
Assistant Director Mobilisation Division

- Captain Reginald N. Custance, February, 1887 – January, 1890.
- Captain Tynte F. Hammill, January, 1890 - April, 1892.
- Captain Arthur Barrow, May, 1892 – March, 1895.
- Captain Richard W. White, April, 1895 - October 1897
- Captain Arthur Barrow, November, 1897 – 28 June 1899
- Captain H.S.H. Prince Louis of Battenberg, June, 1899 – May, 1901.
- Captain Frederick S. Inglefield, 15 October 1902 – February, 1904.
- Captain Charles J. Briggs, 11 February 1904 – December, 1904.
- Captain Charles L. Ottley, December, 1904 - January 1905.
- Captain Charles L. Vaughan-Lee, January, 1905 – December, 1905.
- Captain Francis F. Haworth-Booth, December, 1905 – 19 March 1908.
- Captain Michael Culme-Seymour, 20 March 1908 – 11 October 1909.

Assistant Director War Division

- Captain Charles J. Briggs, March, 1900 – December, 1901.
- Captain Herbert L. Heath, January, 1902 – December, 1903
- Captain George A. Ballard, January, 1904 – January, 1906.
- Captain Harry Jones, January, 1906 – 8 May 1907.
- Captain Osmond Brock, May, 1907 – March, 1909
- Captain Arthur R. Hulbert, March, 1909 – October, 1909 .

Assistant Director Foreign Division

- Captain Sydney M. Eardley Wilmot, February, 1887 - March 1890.
- Captain The Hon. Maurice A. Bourke, April, 1890 – August, 1891.
- Captain The Hon. Assheton G. Curzon-Howe, August, 1891 – September, 1892.
- Captain Henry D. Barry, October, 1892 - October 1895.
- Captain Charles G. Dicken, November, 1895 – October, 1897.
- Captain Robert S. Lowry, October, 1897 - December 1899.
- Captain F. C. Doveton Sturdee, January, 1900 – 16 October 1902.
- Captain Stuart Nicholson, October, 1902 – March, 1906.
- Captain Herbert G. King-Hall, March, 1906 – June, 1908.
- Captain William L. Grant, June, 1908 – December, 1909.
- Captain Thomas Jackson, December, 1909 – January, 1912.

Assistant Director Trade Division

- Captain Edward F. Inglefield, September, 1901, (temporary, until 28 July 1902).
- Captain Harry Jones, 1905 – 15 January 1906.
- Captain Robert F. Scott, January, 1906, – August, 1906.
- Captain Henry H. Campbell, August, 1906 – October, 1909.

Assistant Director Coastal Defences Division

== Divisions ==
The distribution of intelligence work within specialist divisions assigned for those tasks can be seen below.

=== Mobilisation division ===
Responsibilities included:

Section	Responsibility
(A.D.M.D)	Armed Merchant Cruisers (Personnel), Auxiliary requirements of Home Ports for War, Control of railway traffic in times of War, Mobilisation arrangements, Retired officer lists and appointments.

=== War division ===
Responsibilities included:

Section	Responsibility
(A.D.W.D)	All questions related to Indian and Colonial defences, Consideration of all plans for expediation, Distribution of intelligence, Mobilisation arrangements, General questions of strategical policy (including war plans when directed by First Sea Lord and (D.N.I), Preparations on and reports for British manoeuvres and tactical exercises, War Order's for Fleet C-in-C's, Wireless telegraphy.

=== Foreign division ===
Responsibilities included:

Section	Responsibility
(A.D.F.D)	Correspondence with Naval Attaches; Contraband of War; Estimates personnel and mercantile marine of foreign powers; Naval Administration, coast defences, government and private shipyards, arsenals, factories, naval ordnance and communications of foreign powers.

=== Trade division ===
Responsibilities included:

Section	Responsibility
(A.D.T.D)	Questions related to defence of British trade in war; Statistics relating to ocean commerce and trade.

=== Coastal defences division ===
Responsibilities included:

Section	Responsibility
(A.D.CDD.)	Take over duties of Foreign Division with the notation and reports of coastal and port defences of foreign powers. .

== See also ==
- Naval Intelligence Division

== Sources ==
- Allen, Matthew (February 1995). "The Foreign Intelligence Committee and the Origins of the Naval Intelligence Department of the Admiralty". The Mariner's Mirror. 81 (1): 65–78. doi:10.1080/00253359.1995.10656533.
- Briggs, Asa (2011). Secret Days: Code-breaking in Bletchley Park. Frontline Books, London. ISBN 978-1-84832-615-6.
- Dylan, Huw (2014). Defence Intelligence and the Cold War: Britain's Joint Intelligence Bureau 1945-1964. Oxford University Press. ISBN 978-0199657025.
- Pearson, John (1966). The Life of Ian Fleming. Jonathan Cape, London. ISBN 978-1-85410-898-2.
