= Francis Bridgeman (Royal Navy officer) =

Royal Navy Admiral (1848–1929)

Admiral Sir Francis Bridgeman GCB GCVO
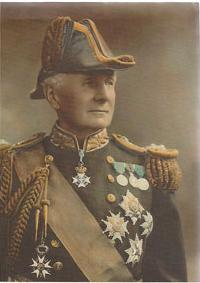
- Admiral Sir Francis Bridgeman
- Born: 7 December 1848; Babworth, Nottinghamshire
- Died: 17 February 1929 (aged 80); Nassau, The Bahamas
- Burial place: St Michael and All Angels Church, Copgrove
- Military career
- Allegiance: United Kingdom
- Branch: Royal Navy
- Service years: 1862–1912
- Rank: Admiral
- Commands: First Sea Lord; Home Fleet; HMS Drake; HMS Ramillies
- Awards: Knight Grand Cross of the Order of the Bath; Knight Grand Cross of the Royal Victorian Order

Admiral Sir Francis Charles Bridgeman Bridgeman, GCB, GCVO (born Bridgeman-Simpson; 7 December 1848 – 17 February 1929) was a Royal Navy officer. As a captain he commanded a battleship and then an armoured cruiser and then, after serving as second-in-command of three different fleets, he twice undertook tours as Commander-in-Chief of the Home Fleet with a stint as Second Sea Lord in between those tours. He became First Sea Lord in November 1911 but clashed with First Lord of the Admiralty Winston Churchill on technical issues as well as matters relating to a perceived overriding of naval traditions by Churchill: this led to Bridgeman's resignation just a year later.

== Naval career ==
Born the son of Reverend William Bridgeman-Simpson and Lady Frances Laura Wentworth FitzWilliam (herself daughter of the 5th Earl Fitzwilliam), as Francis Simpson he joined the Royal Navy as a cadet in the training ship HMS Britannia in 1862. He was posted to the sloop HMS Blanche on the Australia Station in 1868 and, having been promoted to sub-lieutenant in 1869 and to lieutenant on 8 April 1873, he specialised in gunnery. He was posted to the corvette HMS Encounter on the China Station as gunnery officer in 1874 and then to the battleship HMS Temeraire in the Mediterranean Fleet also as gunnery officer. Promoted to commander on 30 June 1884, he joined the battleship HMS Triumph on the Pacific Station in 1885 and then went to the gunnery training ship HMS Excellent in 1888.

He was promoted to captain on 1 January 1890, and that year requested he be referred to as Bridgeman-Simpson. He became Captain of the battleship HMS Ramillies and Flag Captain of the Mediterranean Fleet in October 1893.

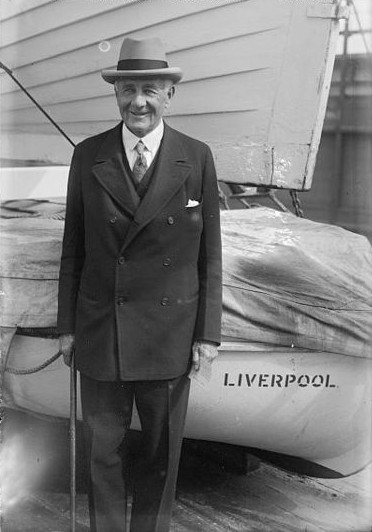
Admiral Sir Francis Bridgeman

Having shortened his name to Bridgeman in 1896, he became Flag Captain at Portsmouth Command in September 1897. Appointed Naval Aide-de-Camp to the King on 24 May 1901, he was in June 1902 posted to HMS Duke of Wellington for service during the 1902 Coronation Fleet review, but the appointment was cancelled when the coronation was postponed. He was given command of the armoured cruiser HMS Drake on its first commission in January 1903, and was appointed a Member of the 4th Class of the Royal Victorian Order on 5 May 1903. Promoted to rear admiral on 12 August 1903, he became Second-in-Command of the Channel Fleet in June 1904, Second-in-Command of the Atlantic Fleet in December 1904 and Second-in-Command of the Mediterranean Fleet in March 1906.

Promoted to vice admiral on 20 February 1907 and advanced to Commander of the Royal Victorian Order on 27 February 1907, Bridgeman went on to be Commander-in-Chief of the Home Fleet in March 1907, hoisting his flag in the battleship HMS Majestic and then in the battleship HMS Dreadnought. Having been advanced to Knight Commander of the Royal Victorian Order on 3 August 1907 and appointed a Knight Commander of the Order of the Bath on 26 June 1908, he became Second Sea Lord in March 1909. Having taken part in the funeral of King Edward VII in May 1910, he became Commander-in-Chief of the Home Fleet again in March 1911. He was promoted to full admiral on 12 April 1911 and was advanced to Knight Grand Cross of the Royal Victorian Order on 24 June 1911.

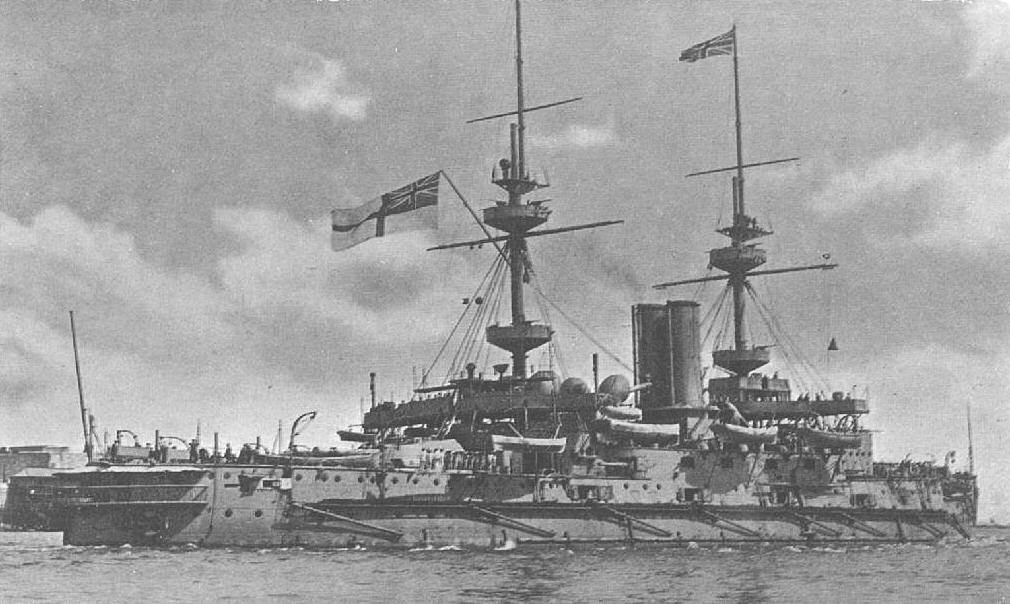
The battleship HMS Majestic, Bridgeman's flagship as Commander-in-Chief of the Home Fleet

Bridgeman became First Sea Lord in November 1911, and allegedly "got the job by default. From a thin list, Bridgeman had one unusual quality in the pre-1914 navy: a willingness to delegate". By October 1912 he had clashed with First Lord of the Admiralty Winston Churchill on technical issues as well as matters relating to a perceived overriding of naval traditions. Churchill's actions were denigrating the authority of senior officers and harming the efficiency of the service, thought Bridgeman, who planned to take his case to Prime Minister H. H. Asquith and King George V. Churchill acted on reports of personal correspondence from Bridgeman to other officers concerning his attacks of appendicitis and bronchitis, and advised Bridgeman on 2 December 1912 that his resignation would be accepted. He was replaced that month. It was subsequently acknowledged, in response to questions in Parliament, that the initiative for resignation on grounds of health emanated from Churchill rather than from Bridgeman himself. In the opinion of historian Hew Strachan: "The combination of frequent change and weak appointees (Wilson, Bridgeman and Battenberg) ensured that the professional leadership of the Royal Navy lost its direction in the four years preceding the war." However, others have taken a more nuanced view of these men. Arthur Marder wrote that while Bridgeman and Battenberg "were not especially forceful and allowed Churchill a good deal of rope", Bridgeman "did possess sound judgement and he might have made a moderately successful First Sea Lord had he served under anybody but Churchill." Indeed, it was Bridgeman's efforts to blockade some of Churchill's more controversial schemes that led to his dismissal, as he himself recognized in a letter to Francis Hopwood: "I was forced out without warning, but it was not because I was too weak, but because I was too strong!"

Following his resignation Bridgeman was advanced to Knight Grand Cross of the Order of the Bath on 10 December 1912. In retirement he lived at Copgrove Hall near Burton Leonard in North Yorkshire and officiated as Vice-Admiral of the United Kingdom from February 1920 until his death at Nassau in The Bahamas on 17 February 1929.

== Family ==
On 6 November 1889, he married Emily Charlotte Shiffner, daughter of Thomas Shiffner; they had no children.

== Sources ==
- Marder, Arthur J. (1961). From the Dreadnought to Scapa Flow. Volume 1. The Road to War 1904–1914. London: Oxford University Press. ISBN 978-0192151223.
- Massie, Robert K. (2007). Dreadnought: Britain, Germany and the Coming of the Great War. Vintage. ISBN 978-1-84413-528-8.
- Strachan, Hew (2001). The First World War, Volume I: To Arms. Oxford University Press. ISBN 0-19-820877-4.

Military offices
Preceded by New post	Commander-in-Chief, Home Fleet; 1907–1909	Succeeded by Sir William May
Preceded by Sir William May	Second Sea Lord; 1909–1911	Succeeded by Sir George Egerton
Preceded by Sir William May	Commander-in-Chief, Home Fleet; 1911	Succeeded by Sir George Callaghan
Preceded by Sir Arthur Wilson	First Sea Lord; 1911–1912	Succeeded by Prince Louis of Battenberg
Honorary titles
Preceded by Sir Michael Culme-Seymour, Bt	Vice-Admiral of the United Kingdom; 1920–1929	Succeeded by Sir Stanley Colville
