= Stuart Nicholson (Royal Navy officer) =

Royal Navy Admiral (1865-1936)

Admiral Stuart Nicholson CB MVO
- Portrait by Walter Stoneman, 1917
- Born: 11 October 1865
- Died: 10 September 1936 (aged 70)
- Military career
- Allegiance: United Kingdom
- Branch: Royal Navy
- Service years: 1878–1920
- Rank: Admiral
- Awards: Member of the Royal Victorian Order; Companion of the Order of the Bath

Admiral Stuart Nicholson, CB, MVO (11 October 1865 – 10 September 1936) was an officer of the Royal Navy who achieved the rank of admiral. He was involved in many international campaigns during his naval service from 1878 through 1920. From 1903 to 1905 he was Assistant-Director of the Naval Intelligence Department. In 1911-1912 he served as Chief of Staff to Admiral Sir Edmund Poë, Commander-in-Chief of the Mediterranean Fleet. During World War I he was a rear admiral in the Home Fleet and commanded the 6th Battle Squadron. The recipient of several medals and honors, he was named a Member of the Royal Victorian Order by King Edward VII in 1908.

== Career ==
A graduate of the Royal Naval School, Nicholson began his career in the Royal Navy in 1878. For his service during the Anglo-Egyptian War of 1882 he was awarded the Egypt Medal and the Khedive's Star. He achieved the rank of Lieutenant on April 11, 1885. In 1888 he became the commander of a TB.29 class torpedo boat. During the Benin Expedition of 1897 he served with distinction on HMS St George and was awarded a medal. His service during this expedition also led to his promotion to the rank of Commander.

Nicholson was promoted to the rank of Captain on June 26, 1902. From 1903 to 1905 he was Assistant-Director of the Naval Intelligence Department. He was appointed commander of HMS Dido in March 1906; remaining in that post until March 1907 when he was appointed commander of the armoured cruiser HMS Natal.

Nicholson was named a Member of the Royal Victorian Order on June 10, 1908, by King Edward VII. In 1911-1912 he served a Chief of Staff to Admiral Sir Edmund Poë, Commander-in-Chief of the Mediterranean Fleet. In 1912 he was promoted to Rear-Admiral and served as the commander of the 6th Battle Squadron from 1913 through 1916 in the midst of World War I. He was subsequently promoted to Vice Admiral in 1917 and finally Admiral in 1920. He retired shortly after achieving this final rank.

Nicholson died on September 10, 1936.
