= Training Squadron (Royal Navy) =

Formation of naval ships

- Active: 1885–1899
- Country: United Kingdom
- Allegiance: British Empire
- Branch: Royal Navy

The Training Squadron was a formation of sailing ships employed for use of naval training from 1885 to 1899.

== History ==
To keep pace with these continuous changes it was early recognised that fresh provision must be made for the technical and scientific training of officers and men. Up to 1854, Naval Cadets, upon nomination, went at once, as a rule, to sea-going and regularly commissioned ships, where they had to pick up their professional education as best they could from the Naval Instructors and other officers who were their shipmates. In 1854 an improvement was made by the commissioning at Portsmouth of an old wooden ship of the line, the Illustrious, Captain Robert Harris, as a stationary training ship, or school, for Naval Cadets.

A similar school was opened in the Implacable, at Devonport, in 1855; but one school was soon found to be enough for the purpose, and the Devonport establishment was closed. New regulations for the entry and training of Naval Cadets were issued in 1857 1; and on 1 January 1859, the Britannia, 120, 2 was commissioned at Portsmouth by the same Captain Robert Harris to take the place of the less suitable Illustrious.

She was removed to Portland in 1862, and to more appropriate moorings at Dartmouth on 30 September 1863; and although the original Britannia was later condemned, a new Britannia, previously known as the Prince of Wales, 3 took her place in July 1869, and retained it until the end of the nineteenth century, at which time, however, preparations were in progress for the removal of the whole establishment to quarters on shore hard by. In 1870, the Trafalgar, 60, screw, was commissioned as a sea-going training-ship for cadets; and the Bristol, 31, Aurora, 28, and other vessels were subsequently used for the same purpose until the establishment of the regular Training Squadron in 1885.

Something has been written already 4 concerning the origin of the naval gunnery schools at Portsmouth and Devonport. At Portsmouth the establishment was housed afloat for many years in the Excellent (ex-Boyne, built in 1810), and subsequently in another Excellent (ex-Queen Charlotte, built also in 1810). In 1891, however, when barracks, practice-batteries, etc., had been erected on Whale Island, a piece of made land in Portsmouth Harbour, the establishment was transferred to the shore and housed in the commodious new buildings.

The education of the boys was continued, at one time in the flying squadrons which were temporarily organised, and afterwards in the regularly constituted Training Squadron, which, only in the last year of the century, was modernised and made to consist exclusively of mastless ships.

=== Rear-Admiral/Commodore, commanding ===
Post holders included:

	Rank	Flag	Name	Term
Rear-Admiral/Commodore, Training Squadron
1	Commodore		Robert O'B. FitzRoy	21 September 1885
2	Commodore		Albert H. Markham	1 November 1886 – 13 November 1889
3	Commodore		Armand T. Powlett	14 November 1889 – 1 August 1891
4	Commodore		Lewis A. Beaumont	1 August 1891
5	Rear-Admiral	Rear-Admiral - Royal Navy	Robert H. Harris	1 June 1893
6	Commodore		George L. Atkinson-Willes	18 April 1895
7	Commodore		Edmund S. Poë	14 October 1897 – 30 October 1899

== Sources ==
- Clowes, Sir William Laird (1903). "46: CIVIL HISTORY OF THE ROYAL NAVY, 1857-1900". The Royal Navy a History from earliest times to the death of Queen Victoria: Volume 7. London, England: Sampson Low Marston and Company. This article incorporates text from this source, which is in the public domain.
- Harley, Simon; Lovell, Tony. (2015) "Training Squadron (Royal Navy)". http://www.dreadnoughtproject.org/Training Squadron (Royal Navy). Harley and Lovell.
- Heathcote, T. A. (2002). British Admirals of the Fleet: 1734–1995. Barnsley, England: Pen and Sword. ISBN 9780850528350.
- Mackie, Colin. (2018) "Royal Navy Senior Appointments from 1865" (PDF). gulabin.com. C. Mackie.
- Watson, Dr Graham. (2015), "PAX BRITANNICA" 1815–1914, and before". www.naval-history.net. G. Smith.

== Attribution ==
This article includes some copied content from The royal navy, a history from the earliest times to present, (1903), volume 7: chapter 46: by Clowes, W. Laird (William Laird), Sir, 1856-1905; Markham, Clements R. (Clements Robert), Sir, 1830-1916; Mahan, A. T. (Alfred Thayer), 1840-1914; Wilson, Herbert Wrigley, 1866-1940, Sampson Low Marston and Company, London, England. now in the public domain.
