= Edmund Poë =

Royal Navy Admiral (1849-1921)

Admiral Sir Edmund Poë GCVO KCB
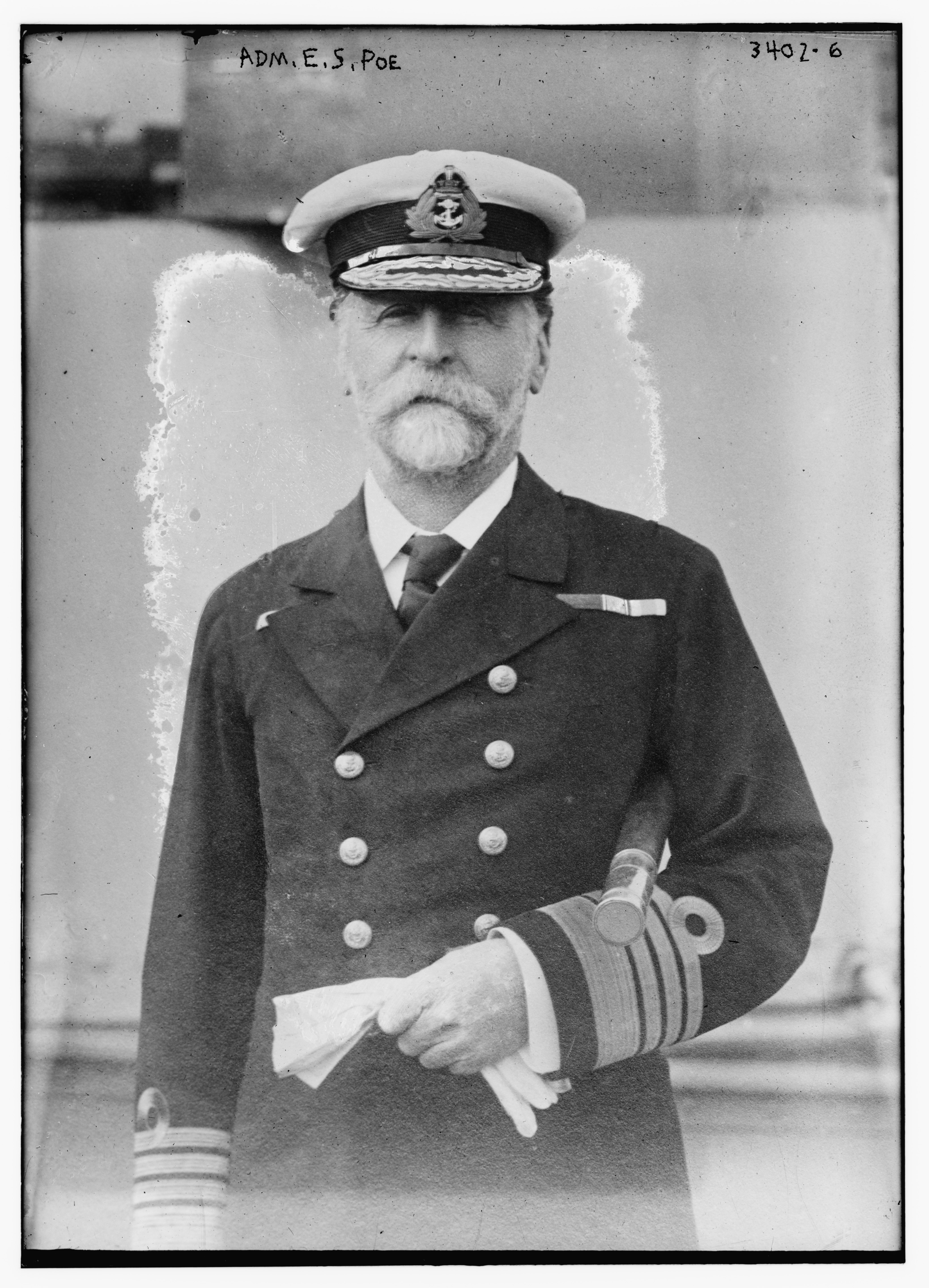
- Born: 11 September 1849; Durraghmore, County Tipperary, Ireland
- Died: 1 April 1921 (aged 71)
- Military career
- Allegiance: United Kingdom
- Branch: Royal Navy
- Service years: 1862–1914
- Rank: Admiral
- Commands: East Indies Station; Cape of Good Hope Station
- Awards: Knight Grand Cross of the Royal Victorian Order; Knight Commander of the Order of the Bath

Admiral Sir Edmund Samuel Poë, GCVO, KCB (11 September 1849 – 1 April 1921) was an Irish Royal Navy officer who went on to be Commander-in-Chief, East Indies station.

== Early life ==
Poë was born on September 11, 1849, in Ireland. His father was William Thomas Poe, a barrister. One of his older brothers was the soldier and politician Sir William Hutcheson Poë. Another older brother, George Leslie Poë, became a Royal Navy Captain.

== Naval career ==
Educated at the Burney's Royal Naval Academy, Gosport, Poë joined the Royal Navy in 1862. In April 1864, he was appointed to HMS Bombay as a midshipman, and was serving on board when the ship caught fire and sank off Montevideo in December 1864 with the loss of 92 crew.

In May 1875, while serving as a lieutenant on HMS Newcastle, Poë jumped overboard to rescue a man who had fallen into the sea. For this he was awarded the bronze medal of the Royal Humane Society; he rescued another man who'd fallen into the sea in October 1876.

He was made Naval Advisor to the Inspector-General of Fortifications in 1889 and Commander of the Training Squadron in 1897.

Promoted to Commodore 2nd Class by 1899 he commanded the Cruiser Squadron until 1900.

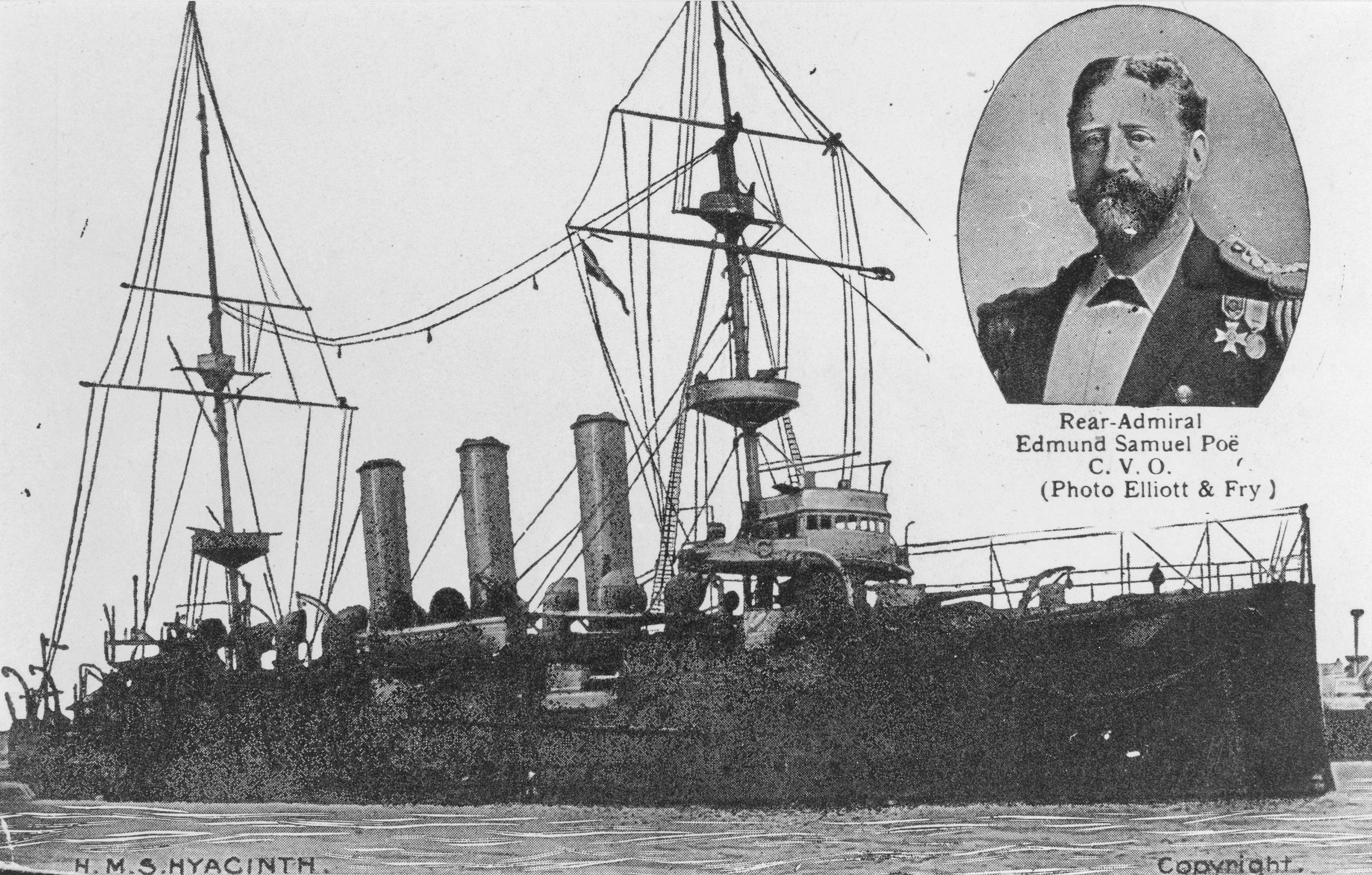
HMS Hyacinth, Poë inset

In September 1901 he was promoted to Rear-Admiral. He went on to be Second in command of the Home Fleet in 1903 and Rear-Admiral Commanding 1st Cruiser Squadron in 1904. He was appointed Commander-in-Chief, East Indies Station in 1905, Commander-in-Chief, Cape of Good Hope Station in 1907 and Commander-in-Chief, Mediterranean Fleet in 1910. Finally was appointed First and Principal Aide-de-Camp to the King in 1912 and retired on September 11, 1914.

== Family ==
In 1877, he married Frances Catherine Sheil. They had two sons and a daughter.

Military offices
Preceded by Sir George Atkinson-Willes	Commander-in-Chief, East Indies Station; 1905–1907	Succeeded by Sir George Warrender
Preceded by Sir John Durnford	Commander-in-Chief, Cape of Good Hope Station; 1907–1908	Succeeded by Sir George Egerton
Preceded by Sir Assheton Curzon-Howe	Commander-in-Chief, Mediterranean Fleet; 1910–1912	Succeeded by Sir Berkeley Milne
Honorary titles
Preceded by Sir Lewis Beaumont	First and Principal Naval Aide-de-Camp; 1913–1914	Succeeded by Sir George Callaghan
