= Charles Carter Drury =

Royal Navy Admiral (1846–1914)

Admiral Sir Charles Carter Drury GCB GCVO KCSI
- Born: 27 August 1846; Rothesay, New Brunswick, British North America
- Died: 18 May 1914 (aged 67); London, England
- Military career
- Allegiance: United Kingdom
- Branch: Royal Navy
- Service years: 1860–1911
- Rank: Admiral
- Commands: Nore Command; Mediterranean Fleet; East Indies Station; HMS Hood
- Awards: Knight Grand Cross of the Order of the Bath; Knight Grand Cross of the Royal Victorian Order; Knight Commander of the Order of the Star of India

Admiral Sir Charles Carter Drury, GCB, GCVO, KCSI (27 August 1846 – 18 May 1914) was a British North American-born senior Admiral of the Royal Navy who served as Second Sea Lord and Chief of Naval Personnel from 1903 to 1907.

== Naval career ==
Born in Rothesay, New Brunswick, Drury was the son of LeBaron Drury (1813–1882), British Consul and High Sheriff of Saint John, New Brunswick, by his wife Eliza Sophia Poyntz, daughter of Colonel James Poyntz (1796–1887), of the 30th (Cambridgeshire) Regiment of Foot.

Drury joined the Royal Navy in 1860 and was made a sub-lieutenant in 1865. He was promoted to lieutenant in 1868, to commander in 1878 and to captain in 1885. Drury was appointed commanding officer of the battleship HMS Hood in 1895.

Promoted to rear-admiral on 13 July 1899, Drury was appointed Commander-in-Chief, East Indies Station from June 1902. He served there during the January 1903 Delhi Durbar to commemorate the accession to the throne of King Edward VII, and was appointed a Knight Commander of the Order of the Star of India (KCSI) in the 1903 Durbar Honours. His time in the East Indies was cut short, however, as he was appointed Second Sea Lord and Chief of Naval Personnel from August 1903. He was promoted to vice admiral in 1904, and became Commander-in-Chief, Mediterranean Fleet from 1907 before being promoted to admiral and becoming Commander-in-Chief, The Nore in 1908. He retired in 1911.

Drury was Aide-de-camp to Queen Victoria from 1897 to 1899.

== Family ==
Drury married Francis Ellen Whitehead, daughter of Robert Whitehead, of Beckett, Shrivenham, Berkshire. She died at the residence of her father on 22 February 1900.

His first cousin, Major General Charles William Drury, was the father of Lady Beaverbrook.

== Arms ==
Coat of arms of Charles Carter Drury

Notes
Granted by Sir Arthur Vicars, Ulster King of Arms, 27 March 1907.
Crest
On a wreath of the colours a greyhound courant Argent collared and charged on the shoulder with a trefoil slipped Vert.
Escutcheon
Quarterly 1st & 4th Argent a --- anchor in pale Proper on a chief Vert a -- between two mullets pierced Or (Drury) 2nd & 3rd per pale Or and Argent a bordure Gules charged with six escallops of the second (Maule).
Motto
Non Sine Causa

Military offices
Preceded by Sir Day Bosanquet	Commander-in-Chief, East Indies Station; 1902–1903	Succeeded by Sir George Atkinson-Willes
Preceded by Sir John Fisher	Second Sea Lord; 1903–1907	Succeeded by Sir William May
Preceded by Lord Charles Beresford	Commander-in-Chief, Mediterranean Fleet; 1907–1908	Succeeded by Sir Assheton Curzon-Howe
Preceded by Sir Gerard Noel	Commander-in-Chief, The Nore; 1908–1911	Succeeded by Sir Richard Poore
