= Flag Officer Submarines =

Flag Officer Submarines (FOSM) may refer to:

- Flag Officer Submarines (India)
- Commodore Submarine Service, earlier called Flag Officer Submarines.
