= George Atkinson-Willes =

Royal Navy Admiral (1847-1921)

Admiral Sir George Atkinson-Willes KCB
- Born: 13 July 1847
- Died: 25 December 1921 (aged 74)
- Military career
- Allegiance: United Kingdom
- Branch: Royal Navy
- Service years: 1861–1912
- Rank: Admiral
- Commands: HMS Comus; HMS Indefatigable; HMS Agamemnon; HMS Hero; HMS Howe; Home Fleet; East Indies Station
- Conflicts: Dervish War
- Awards: Knight Commander of the Order of the Bath

Admiral Sir George Lambart Atkinson-Willes, KCB (13 July 1847 – 25 December 1921) was a Royal Navy officer who went on to be Commander-in-Chief, East Indies Station.

== Naval career ==
Educated at Leamington College and at Burney's Royal Naval Academy in Gosport, he joined the Royal Navy as a cadet in 1861 and took part in the Abyssinian Expedition in 1868 where he was second in command of the naval rocket brigade.

Promoted to Captain in 1886, he commanded HMS Comus, HMS Indefatigable, HMS Agamemnon, HMS Hero and then HMS Howe. He was appointed commodore commanding the Training Squadron in 1895 and then commanded the Dockyard Reserve at Chatham from 1898.

In 1901 he assumed the additional surname of Willes in compliance with the will of his uncle Admiral Sir George Ommanney Willes. The same year he was promoted to rear admiral on 19 February 1901, and in May 1902 he became Second-in-Command of the Home Fleet. He hoisted his flag on board the pre-dreadnought battleship HMS Resolution on 7 May 1902, as his flagship during the Coronation Fleet Review for King Edward VII. After the end of the manoeuvres, he transferred on 16 September to HMS Empress of India, which became flagship to the Home Squadron, the permanent sea-going nucleus of the Home Fleet.

In 1903 he was appointed Commander-in-Chief, East Indies Station. He led a squadron of three ships during the Dervish War in 1904, supplying landing parties that stormed and captured the forts at Illig, his ships' guns supporting the attack. In June 1905 in recognition of his services opposing the Dervish state he was made a Knight Commander of the Order of the Bath.

Atkinson-Willes was promoted vice admiral in 1905 and admiral in 1908. He retired in July 1912 and died in December 1921, aged 74.

Military offices
Preceded by Sir Charles Drury	Commander-in-Chief, East Indies Station; 1903–1905	Succeeded by Sir Edmund Poë
