= Sydney Fremantle =

Royal Navy Admiral (1867–1958)

Admiral Sir Sydney Fremantle GCB MVO
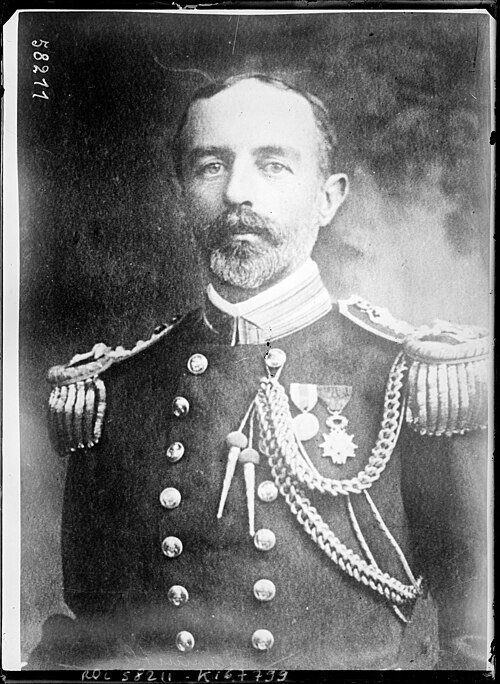
- Born: 16 November 1867
- Died: 29 April 1958 (aged 90)
- Military career
- Allegiance: United Kingdom
- Branch: Royal Navy
- Service years: 1881–1928
- Rank: Admiral
- Conflicts: Scuttling of the German fleet at Scapa Flow
- Awards: Knight Grand Cross of the Order of the Bath; Member of the Royal Victorian Order; Distinguished Service Medal (United States); Commander of the Légion d'honneur (France); Commander of the Order of the Redeemer (Greece); Commander of the Order of the Rising Sun (Japan); Commander of the Order of Saints Maurice and Lazarus (Italy)

Admiral Sir Sydney Robert Fremantle, GCB, MVO (16 November 1867 – 29 April 1958) was an officer of the Royal Navy, who served during the Victorian era and had risen to the rank of rear-admiral by the outbreak of the First World War. He played a role in developing fleet communications and signalling methods prior to the war, but was hampered in effectively implementing them due to the disruption caused by the conflict. He had an active seagoing career during the war, commanding several of the cruiser squadrons, and later taking command of the British fleet in the Aegean. Promoted to vice-admiral after the end of the war and given command of the First Battle Squadron, Fremantle oversaw the interned German High Seas Fleet at Scapa Flow, and was away on exercises when the sailors began to scuttle their ships in June 1919. He attempted to salvage what he could, later accusing the German commander, Vice-Admiral Ludwig von Reuter, of a shameful breach of honour. Fremantle rose to full admiral and commanded the naval base at Portsmouth, retiring in 1928. He wrote his memoirs, publishing them after the Second World War, and donated many of his papers to institutions before his death in 1958.

== Family ==
Sydney was born into a naval family on 1 January 1867, the eldest son of Admiral Sir Edmund Robert Fremantle and his wife Barberina Rogers Isaacs.

== Prewar service ==
Fremantle followed his father into the navy, joining up in 1881. He rose steadily through the ranks, being promoted to lieutenant in 1887, commander in 1889 and captain in 1903. By 1908 he was commanding the armoured cruiser HMS Lancaster with the Mediterranean Fleet.

Fremantle joined the Admiralty in 1910 as the Head of the War Division, and by 1912, he was at Portsmouth as President of the Signal Committee. While in this role, Fremantle was charged with overseeing the overhaul of the existing signal systems and books to incorporate the latest advances made possible through wireless telegraphy. He was promoted to rear-admiral in 1913, and though his suggestion for a dedicated communications department was overtaken by the outbreak of war, a Signals Division was established at the Admiralty in 1914, with Fremantle as its head.

== First World War ==
Fremantle became second-in-command of the Third Battle Squadron in 1915, followed by commander of the Ninth Cruiser Squadron in 1916, and the Second Cruiser Squadron in early 1917. He was next appointed Rear-Admiral, Second-in-Command, Eastern Mediterranean Squadron from February to July 1916. His next appointment was Rear-Admiral Commanding, British Aegean Squadron in August 1917, and in December advocated the resumption of raids on the Turkish coast, a proposal rejected by the Admiralty on the grounds that no significant benefits were anticipated. In January the following year, Fremantle received a promotion to vice-admiral, and an appointment as Deputy Chief of the Naval Staff. As the war drew to a close, Fremantle was one of the officers who advocated the surrender of the German High Seas Fleet as a condition for an armistice. In October 1918, he made the case for the Royal Navy, stating that the naval disarmament of Germany was necessary, lest they be tempted into a 'recommencement of warlike operations'. Fremantle's proposals did not find favour with the American planners, who were keen to limit British naval domination.

He was mentioned in despatches during the war, and after its end, Fremantle received a number of honours for his service, including several international ones. The United States awarded him the Distinguished Service Medal, France made him a Commander of the Légion d'honneur, while he was also made a Commander of the Greek Order of the Redeemer, the Japanese Order of the Rising Sun, and the Italian Order of Saints Maurice and Lazarus.

== Postwar ==
=== Scapa Flow and the scuttling of the fleet ===
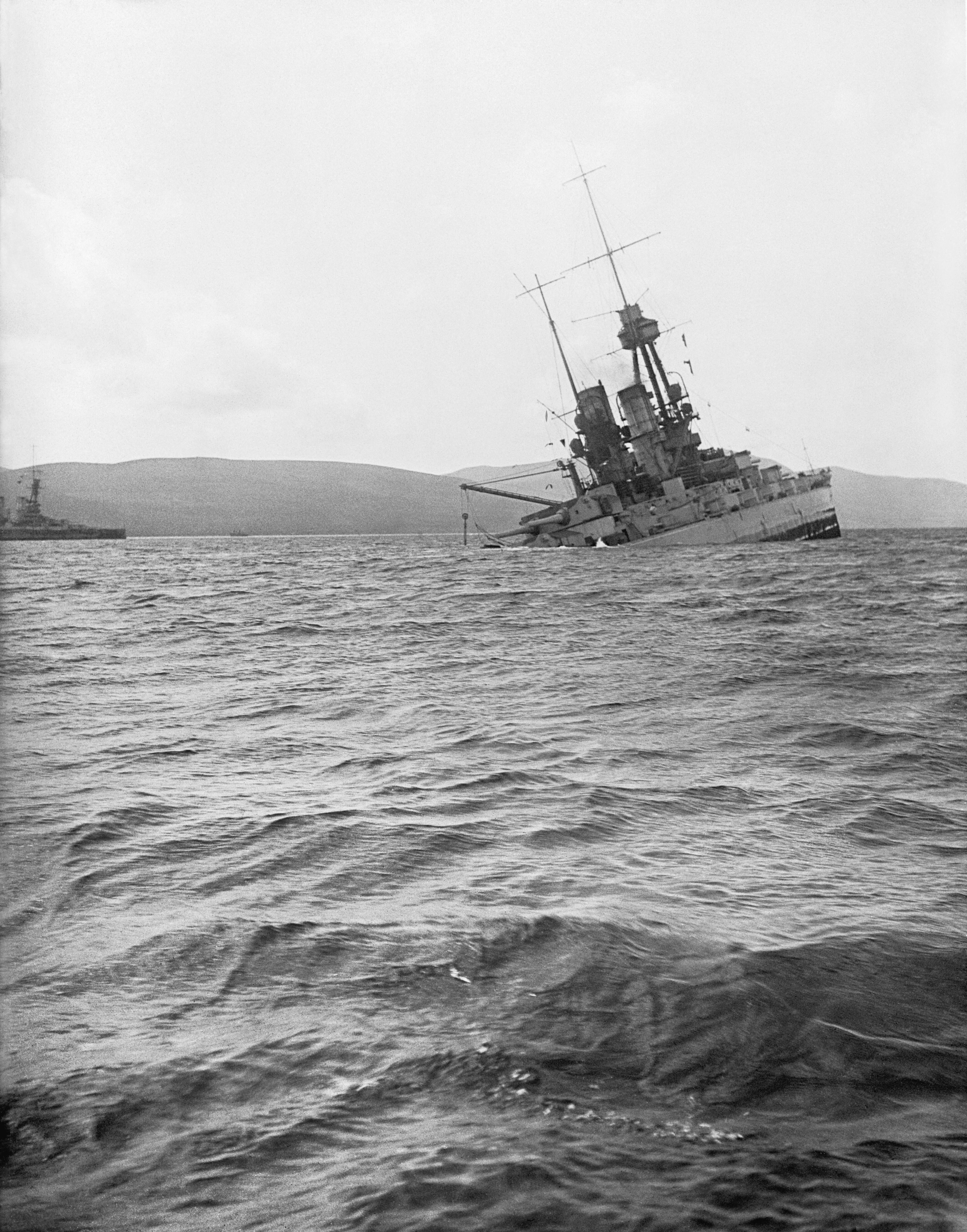
The German battleship Bayern sinking in Scapa Flow after being scuttled by her crew

Fremantle continued in the navy, becoming commander of the 1st Battle Squadron in May 1919. A large portion of the German fleet had by this point been interned at the Royal Navy's northern base at Scapa Flow, and Fremantle's task as commander of the First Battle Squadron was to keep a watchful eye on them. The deadline for the signing of the Treaty of Versailles was by then approaching, and concerns had begun to circulate about the possibility of the disgruntled German sailors scuttling their ships, rather than agreeing to hand them over as stipulated in the terms of the treaty. Fremantle drew up orders for the ships to be seized on the expiration of the deadline for the signing of the treaty, and had them approved by his superior, Admiral Sir Charles Madden. The deadline, meanwhile, was extended from 21 June to 7pm on 23 June. Fremantle decided to take his squadron to sea to carry out exercises on 21 June, and return in the afternoon of 23 June to commence procedures for seizing the fleet. Unbeknownst to him, the German commander, Vice-Admiral Ludwig von Reuter, intended to order the scuttling of the fleet on 21 June, unaware that the deadline had been extended. As Fremantle steamed out of Scapa Flow on the morning of 21 June, Reuter was completing his preparations. The scuttling of the fleet began just before midday. When the British realised what was happening, a message was immediately despatched to Fremantle, who returned to Scapa Flow at full speed.

Fremantle had destroyers tow sinking ships ashore and beach them, while boarding parties attempted to reverse the scuttling or order the Germans aboard to do so. Those Germans who abandoned ship were picked up. Reuter was brought aboard Fremantle's flagship, HMS Revenge, where he and Fremantle engaged in a brief argument with the aid of an interpreter. The following day, Fremantle assembled Reuter and his officers on the deck of Revenge, and through an interpreter informed them of their breaches 'of faith and honour' and accused them of recommencing hostilities by sinking their ships. The prisoners were then led into captivity.

=== Later life ===
Fremantle received a promotion to full admiral in 1922, and in 1923 was appointed Commander-in-Chief, Portsmouth, a post he held until 1926. He retired from the Navy in 1928, having been appointed a Knight Grand Cross of the Order of the Bath, and a Member of the Royal Victorian Order.

He eventually wrote his memoirs, entitled My Naval Career: 1880-1928, and published them in 1949.

He married Lelia Hope Fremantle on 1 December 1896, and on 1 August 1931, he married for the second time, this time to Geraldine Margaret Cooke-Collis. He had three children by his first wife, one of whom, Edmund Seymour Denis Fremantle, also served in the Navy, receiving the Distinguished Service Order for service in the Second World War and twice being mentioned in despatches.

Admiral Sydney Fremantle died on 29 April 1958 at the age of 90. He donated most of his papers, which are held in the collections of the National Maritime Museum, and King's College London.

== Bibliography ==
- "Fremantle, Sir Sydney Robert, Admiral, 1867-1958". Archive Catalogue. The National Maritime Museum. 2008.
- "FREMANTLE, Sir Sydney (Robert) (1867–1958), Admiral". Archive Catalogue. King's College London, Liddell Hart Centre for Military Archives.
- Halpern, Paul G. (1995). A naval history of World War I. Routledge. ISBN 1-85728-498-4.
- Humble, Richard (1983). Fraser of North Cape: the life of admiral of the fleet, Lord Fraser, 1888-1981. Routledge. ISBN 0-7100-9555-4.
- Kent, Barrie H. (2004). Signal!: A History of Signalling in the Royal Navy. Permanent Publications. ISBN 1-85623-025-2.
- Charles Mosley, ed. (2003). Burke's Peerage, Baronetage & Knightage, 107th edition. Vol. 1. Wilmington, Delaware: Burke's Peerage (Genealogical Books) Ltd.
- Rose, Lisle Abbott (2007). Power at Sea. University of Missouri Press. ISBN 978-0-8262-1702-8.
- Van der Vat, Dan (2007) [1987]. The Grand Scuttle: The Sinking of the German Fleet at Scapa Flow in 1919. Edinburgh: Birlinn Ltd. ISBN 978-1-84341-038-6.

Military offices
Preceded by Sir Henry Oliver	Deputy Chief of the Naval Staff; 1918–1919	Succeeded by Sir James Fergusson
Preceded by Sir Somerset Gough-Calthorpe	Commander-in-Chief, Portsmouth; 1923–1926	Succeeded by Sir Osmond Brock
