= Home Fleet =

Former naval fleet of the Royal Navy

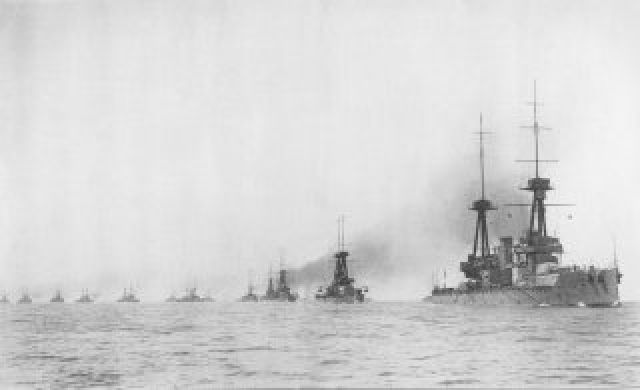
- HMS Neptune leading the Home Fleet before the First World War
- Active: 1902–1904, 1907–1914, 1932–1967
- Country: United Kingdom
- Branch: Royal Navy
- Type: Fleet

Commanders
- Notable commanders: George Callaghan, John Tovey, Bruce Fraser

The Home Fleet was a fleet of the Royal Navy that operated from the United Kingdom's territorial waters from 1902 with intervals until 1967. In 1967, it was merged with the Mediterranean Fleet creating the new Western Fleet.

Before the First World War between 1902 and 1904 the Admiralty reorganised its ships in home waters into a permanent force called the Home Squadron. At the beginning of 1905, it was renamed the Channel Fleet. In 1907 a new Home Fleet was formed from ships in reserve and new ships, and in 1909 the Channel Fleet was merged into it, forming the principal fleet in British waters. In 1912 it was renamed the Home Fleets, formed of the First, Second and Third fleets. On the outbreak of the First World War the First Fleet became the Grand Fleet. When the Grand Fleet was redistributed after the war, the reserve fleet was briefly named Home Fleet in 1919 before being renamed, and after the Invergordon Mutiny in 1931 the Atlantic Fleet was renamed Home Fleet in 1932. During the Second World War, it was the Royal Navy's main battle force in European waters.

== Pre–First World War ==
In the first years of the 20th century the Royal Navy had a number of 'Port Guard' ships, stationed in major naval bases. In 1902 these ships were stationed at the Nore (Sheerness), Portsmouth, Plymouth, and Queenstown (now Cobh).

On 1 October 1902, the Admiral Superintendent Naval Reserves, then Vice-Admiral Gerard Noel, was given the additional appointment of Commander-in-Chief, Home Fleet, and allotted a rear-admiral to serve under him as commander of the Home Squadron. In the words of historian Matthew Seligmann, "... the nucleus of the Home Fleet would consist of the four Port Guard ships, which would be withdrawn from their various scattered dockyards and turned into a unified and permanent sea-going command – the Home Squadron – based on Portland. Also under the direction of the commander-in-chief of the Home Fleet would be the Coast Guard ships, which would continue to be berthed for the most part in their respective district harbours in order to carry out their local duties, but would join the Home Squadron for sea work at least three times per year, at which point the assembled force – the Home Squadron and the Coast Guard vessels – would be known collectively as the Home Fleet." Rear-Admiral George Atkinson-Willes was Second-in-Command of the Home Fleet, with his flag in the battleship HMS Empress of India, at this time. In May 1903 Noel was succeeded as Commander-in-Chief by Vice-Admiral Sir Arthur Wilson.

On 14 December 1904, the Channel Fleet was re-styled the Atlantic Fleet and the Home Fleet became the Channel Fleet. In 1907, the Home Fleet was reformed with Vice-Admiral Francis Bridgeman in command, succeeded by Admiral Sir William May in 1909. Bridgeman took command again in 1911, and in the same year was succeeded by Admiral Sir George Callaghan. On 29 March 1912, a new structure of the fleet was announced, which came into force on 1 May 1912. The former Home Fleet, which was organised into four divisions, was divided into the First, Second and Third Fleets as Home Fleets. The Home Fleets were the Navy's unified home commands in British waters from 1912 to 1914. On 4 August 1914, as the First World War was breaking out, John Jellicoe was ordered to take command of the Fleet, which by his appointment order was renamed the Grand Fleet.

=== Commander-in-Chief, Home Fleet ===
Post holders during the pre-war period were:'

	Rank	Flag	Name	Term
Commander-in-Chief, Home Fleet
1	Vice-Admiral	Vice-Admiral - Royal Navy	Sir Gerard Noel	1 October 1902 – 21 May 1903
2	Vice-Admiral	Vice-Admiral - Royal Navy	Sir Arthur Wilson	21 May 1903 – 31 December 1904

	Rank	Flag	Name	Term
Commander-in-Chief, Home Fleet
1	Vice-Admiral	Vice-Admiral - Royal Navy	Sir Francis Bridgeman	5 March 1907 – 24 March 1909
2	Vice-Admiral	Vice-Admiral - Royal Navy	Sir William May	24 March 1909 – 1911
3	Vice-Admiral	Vice-Admiral - Royal Navy	Sir Francis Bridgeman	25 March 1911 – 5 December 1911
4	Vice-Admiral	Vice-Admiral - Royal Navy	Sir George Callaghan	5 December 1911 – 31 July 1912

==== Second in command ====
Post holders included:

	Rank	Flag	Name	Term
Second-in-Command, Home Fleet
1	Rear-Admiral	Rear-Admiral - Royal Navy	George Atkinson-Willes	October 1902 – May 1903
2	Rear-Admiral	Rear-Admiral - Royal Navy	Edmund Poë	May 1903 – June 1904
3	Rear-Admiral	Rear-Admiral - Royal Navy	Charles Barlow	June–December 1904

==== Chief of staff ====
Post holders included:

	Rank	Flag	Name	Term
Chief of Staff, Home Fleet
1	Rear-Admiral	Rear-Admiral - Royal Navy	Alexander Bethell	January 1908 – March 1909

== Home Fleets, 1912–1914 ==
The Home Fleets were a new organisation of the Royal Navy's unified home commands (First, Second and Third Fleets) instituted on 31 July 1912 to August 1914.

=== Commander-in-Chief, Home Fleets ===
	Rank	Flag	Name	Term
Commander-in-Chief, Home Fleets/First Fleet
1	Admiral	Admiral - Royal Navy	Sir George Callaghan	31 July 1912 – 4 August 1914

On 8 August 1914 units of the Home Fleets were distributed in accordance with Admiralty Fleet Order the majority of elements formed the new Grand Fleet others were assigned to the following units: Channel Fleet, Northern Patrol-Cruiser Force B, 7th Cruiser Squadron-Cruiser Force, 11th Cruiser Squadron-Cruiser Force E, Dover Patrol, Harwich Flotillas, 7th Destroyer Flotilla, 8th Destroyer Flotilla, 9th Destroyer Flotilla, 5th Submarine Flotilla, 6th Submarine Flotilla, 7th Submarine Flotilla and the 8th Submarine Flotilla.

== Inter-war period ==
When the Grand Fleet was disbanded in April 1919, the more powerful ships were grouped into the Atlantic Fleet and the older ships became the "Home Fleet"; this arrangement lasted until late 1919, when the ships of the Home Fleet became the Reserve Fleet.

The name "Home Fleet" was resurrected in March 1932, as the new name for the Atlantic Fleet, following the Invergordon Mutiny. The Commander-in-Chief, Home Fleet in 1933 was Admiral Sir John Kelly. The Home Fleet comprised the flagship Nelson leading a force that included the 2nd Battle Squadron (five more battleships), the Battlecruiser Squadron (Hood and Renown), the 2nd Cruiser Squadron (Vice-Admiral Edward Astley-Rushton) aboard Dorsetshire (three cruisers), three destroyer flotillas (27), a submarine flotilla (six), two aircraft carriers and associated vessels.

=== Commander-in-Chief, Home Fleet ===
Post holders during the inter-war period were:

	Rank	Flag	Name	Term
Commander-in-Chief, Home Fleet
1	Admiral	Admiral - Royal Navy	Sir John Kelly	October 1931 – September 1933
2	Admiral	Admiral - Royal Navy	Sir William Boyle	September 1933 – August 1935
3	Admiral	Admiral - Royal Navy	Sir Roger Backhouse	August 1935 – April 1938

== Second World War ==
The Home Fleet was the Royal Navy's main battle force in European waters during the Second World War. On 3 September 1939, under Admiral Forbes flying his flag in Nelson at Scapa Flow, it consisted of: the 2nd Battle Squadron; the Battle Cruiser Squadron; 18th Cruiser Squadron; Rear-Admiral, Destroyers; Rear-Admiral, Submarines (2nd Submarine Flotilla, Dundee, 6th Submarine Flotilla Blyth, Northumberland); Vice-Admiral, Aircraft Carriers (Vice-Admiral L. V. Wells, with Ark Royal, Furious, and Pegasus); and the Orkney and Shetlands force. Its chief responsibility was to keep Germany's Kriegsmarine from breaking out of the North Sea. For this purpose, the First World War base at Scapa Flow was reactivated as it was well placed for interceptions of ships trying to run the blockade.

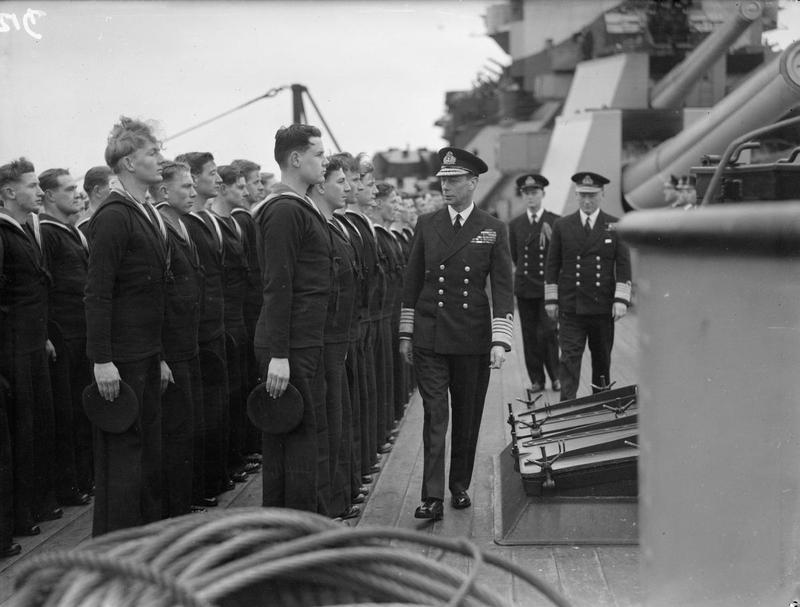
King George VI visiting the Home Fleet at Scapa Flow in March 1943

The two most surprising losses of the Home Fleet during the early part of the war were the sinking of the battleship Royal Oak by the German submarine U-47 while supposedly safe in Scapa Flow, and the loss of the pride of the Navy, the battlecruiser Hood, to the German battleship Bismarck. 2nd Battle Squadron under Admiral Blagrove was effectively disestablished when he died in the sinking of Royal Oak.

The Home Fleet was used extensively in the protection in PQ, QP, JW and RA convoys from the UK and Iceland to Russia and vice versa. One of the Home Fleet's biggest successes along the Arctic Convoys was the sinking of the German battleship Scharnhorst while protecting convoy JW55B under the command of Sir Bruce Fraser, who was sailing in HMS Duke of York. The growing intensity of the Battle of the Atlantic led to the creation of Western Approaches Command. Only with the destruction of the German battleship Tirpitz in 1944 did the Home Fleet assume a lower priority, and most of its heavy units were withdrawn to be sent to the Far East.

Commanders-in-Chief, Home Fleet, 1938–1945
	Rank	Flag	Name	Term
1	Admiral	Admiral - Royal Navy	Sir Charles Forbes	April 1938 – December 1940
2	Admiral	Admiral - Royal Navy	Sir John Tovey	December 1940 – May 1943
3	Admiral	Admiral - Royal Navy	Sir Bruce Fraser	May 1943 – June 1944
4	Admiral	Admiral - Royal Navy	Sir Henry Moore	14 June 1944 – 24 November 1945

Post holder sources for the Second World War:

=== Second in command ===
Post holders included:

	Rank	Flag	Name	Term
Second-in-Command, Home Fleet
1	Vice-Admiral	Vice-Admiral - Royal Navy	Sir Alban Curteis	1941 – June 1942
2	Vice-Admiral	Vice-Admiral - Royal Navy	Sir Bruce A. Fraser	June 1942 – June 1943
3	Vice-Admiral	Vice-Admiral - Royal Navy	Sir Henry R. Moore	June 1943 – June 1944
4	Vice-Admiral	Vice-Admiral - Royal Navy	Sir Frederick Dalrymple-Hamilton	June 1944 – April 1945
5	Vice-Admiral	Vice-Admiral - Royal Navy	Sir Rhoderick McGrigor	April–July 1945
6	Vice-Admiral	Vice-Admiral - Royal Navy	Sir Angus Cunninghame Graham	July 1945 – October 1946

== Post–Second World War ==
As the Cold War began, greater emphasis was placed on protecting the North Atlantic sea lanes from the Soviet Union in concert with other Western countries. Admiral Sir Rhoderick McGrigor supervised combined Western Union exercises involving ships from the British, French, and Dutch navies in June–July 1949. Admiral McGrigor flew his flag from the aircraft carrier Implacable. Also taking part in the exercises were Victorious and Anson, along with cruisers and destroyers. During the exercise, the combined force paid a visit to Mount's Bay in Cornwall from 30 June – 4 July 1949.

Admiral Sir Philip Vian, Commander-in-Chief from 1950 to 1952, flew his flag in Vanguard.

From 1947 to 1957 superfluous battleships and aircraft carriers were assigned to the Training Squadron, Home Fleet headquartered at Portland to provide basic training. The carriers stationed here were mobilised as helicopter carriers for the Suez operation in 1956.

After 1951 the term flotilla applied to the higher command organisation of squadrons in the Home and Mediterranean Fleets.

In October 1951, Rear-Admiral Geoffrey Robson, D.S.O., D.S.C., was advised of his appointment as Flag Officer (Flotillas) Home Fleet (short title F.O.F.H.). He hoisted his flag and took up the post in December 1951. HMS Superb (25) became his flagship. With his appointment as F.O.F.H. the post of Flag Officer Commanding 2nd Cruiser Squadron was disestablished. The remaining Home Fleet cruisers were added to the 3rd Aircraft Carrier Squadron, which then became the Heavy Squadron, Home Fleet (under the Flag Officer, Heavy Squadron, Home Fleet, short title, F.O.H.S.). In addition to the carriers and cruisers, the battleship Vanguard formed part of the squadron. The squadron was disbanded in October 1954.

In late 1951, Theseus joined the fleet as flagship of the 3rd Aircraft Carrier Squadron.

After the Second World War, the Royal Navy's geographic commands were gradually merged into fewer but larger formations (1954 to 1971). The squadrons of the Home Fleet were grouped under a Flag Officer, Flotillas, Home Fleet, who became the main seagoing flag officer. Among these officers were Vice-Admiral Sir Charles Madden and Vice-Admiral Royston Wright. In the Far East the Flag Officer 5th Cruiser Squadron became Flag Officer Second in Command Far East Fleet with similar seagoing duties. Increasingly the term 'Submarine Flotilla' was used to describe the squadrons under command of the Flag Officer Submarines.

After the disbandment of the Heavy Squadron, Home Fleet, the Flag Officer, Aircraft Carriers assumed administrative responsibility for all the operational carriers.

The Commander-in-Chief, Home Fleet, gained an additional NATO responsibility as Commander-in-Chief, Eastern Atlantic (CINCEASTLANT), as part of Allied Command Atlantic, when the NATO military command structure was established in 1953. CINCEASTLANT was set up at the Northwood Headquarters in northwest London. The Commander-in-Chief Home Fleet still flew his flag however in Tyne at Portsmouth. During Exercise Mainbrace in 1952, NATO naval forces came together for the first time to practice the defence of northern Europe, Denmark and Norway. The resulting McMahon Act difficulties caused by potential British control of the United States Navy's attack carriers armed with nuclear weapons led to the creation of a separate Striking Fleet Atlantic, directly responsible to the commander of the U.S. Navy's Atlantic Fleet, in his NATO position as SACLANT, by the end of 1952. The submarine tender Maidstone was the fleet's flagship in 1956.

In the spring of 1960, C-in-C Home Fleet moved permanently ashore to Northwood, while Flag Officer, Flotillas, Home, retained effective control at sea as the C-in-C's deputy. Cecil Hampshire writes that the ships with the fleet in 1960 included the flagship Tyne, a destroyer depot ship which by then was more than 20 years old; carriers Victorious and HMS Albion; fast minelayer Apollo; seventeen destroyers and frigates; and sixteen submarines. Another aircraft carrier, cruisers Lion and Blake; the first four guided missile destroyers, and other ships were under construction.

In February 1963 all remaining frigate and destroyer squadrons in the Home, Mediterranean and Far East Fleets were merged into new Escort Squadrons. In April 1963, the naval unit at the Northwood Headquarters, in northwest London, was commissioned as HMS Warrior under the command of the then Captain of the Fleet.

From 1966 to 1967, then-Rear Admiral Sir Michael Pollock was listed as Flag Officer Second in Command, Home Fleet.

In December 1966, all remaining squadrons in the Home Fleet were disbanded. In 1967 the Home Fleet was amalgamated with the Mediterranean Fleet and redesignated the Western Fleet.

=== Commanders-in-Chief ===
	Rank	Flag	Name	Term
Commanders-in-Chief, Home Fleet 1945–67
1	Admiral	Admiral - Royal Navy	Sir Neville Syfret	November 1945 – January 1948
2	Admiral	Admiral - Royal Navy	Sir Rhoderick McGrigor	January 1948 – January 1950
3	Admiral	Admiral - Royal Navy	Sir Philip Vian	January 1950 – June 1952
4	Admiral	Admiral - Royal Navy	Sir George Creasy	January 1952 – January 1954
5	Admiral	Admiral - Royal Navy	Sir Michael Denny	January 1954 – January 1956
6	Admiral	Admiral - Royal Navy	Sir John Eccles	January 1956 – January 1958
7	Admiral	Admiral - Royal Navy	Sir William Davis	January 1958 – July 1960
8	Admiral	Admiral - Royal Navy	Sir Wilfrid Woods	July 1960 – January 1963
9	Admiral	Admiral - Royal Navy	Sir Charles Madden, 2nd Baronet	January 1963 – July 1965
10	Admiral	Admiral - Royal Navy	Sir John Frewen	July 1965 – October 1967

Source for post holders after the Second World War:

== Sources ==
- Heathcote, Tony (2002). The British Admirals of the Fleet 1734 – 1995. Pen & Sword Ltd. ISBN 0-85052-835-6.
- Harley, Simon; Lovell, Tony (22 August 2017). "Home Fleets (Royal Navy) – The Dreadnought Project". Dreadnoughtproject.org. Harley & Lovell.
- Mackie, Colin (December 2017). "Royal Navy Senior Appointments from 1865" (PDF). gulabin.com. Colin Mackie.
- Maloney, Sean. (1992), Securing Command of the Sea, Masters' thesis, University of New Brunswick. Canada.
- RUSI (1952). "Navy Notes". Royal United Services Institution. Journal. 97 (585): 116–123. doi:10.1080/03071845209422842.
- Seligmann, Matthew S. (August 2010). "A prelude to the reforms of Admiral Sir John Fisher: the creation of the Home Fleet, 1902–3". Historical Research. 83 (221).
