= H.Q. British Forces, Aden =

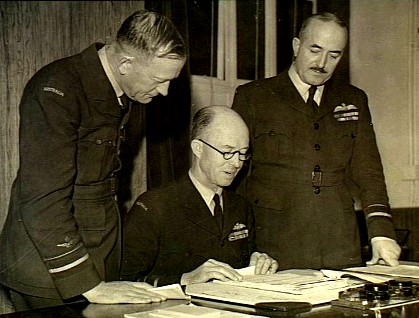
Air Vice Marshal F. H. McNamara VC (RAAF) is standing on the right (November, 1941).

H.Q. British Forces, Aden was a command of the Royal Air Force (RAF) established on 14 April 1942 by renaming the Aden Command. The components of H.Q. British Forces, Aden are indicated below for two dates during World War II.

27 October 1942 Air Vice Marshal Frederick Hards	10 July 1943 Air Vice Marshal F. H. McNamara VC (RAAF)
No. 8 Squadron, Blenheim	No. 8 Squadron, Blenheim
No. 459 Squadron (RAAF), Hudson	No. 1566 Flight (Meteorological), Gladiator
Defence Flight, Hurricane	Catalina Flight, Catalina

H.Q. British Forces Aden primarily conducted antisubmarine warfare operations and escort missions as a sub-command of RAF Middle East Command, which itself was a sub-command of Mediterranean Air Command following a major reorganization of the Allied air forces in the North African and Mediterranean Theater of Operations (MTO) in February 1943.

On 6 October 1956, H.Q. British Forces, Aden was renamed H.Q. British Forces, Arabian Peninsula.
