= Armilla patrol =

- Active: 1980s–1990s
- Country: United Kingdom
- Branch: Royal Navy
- Type: Naval formation

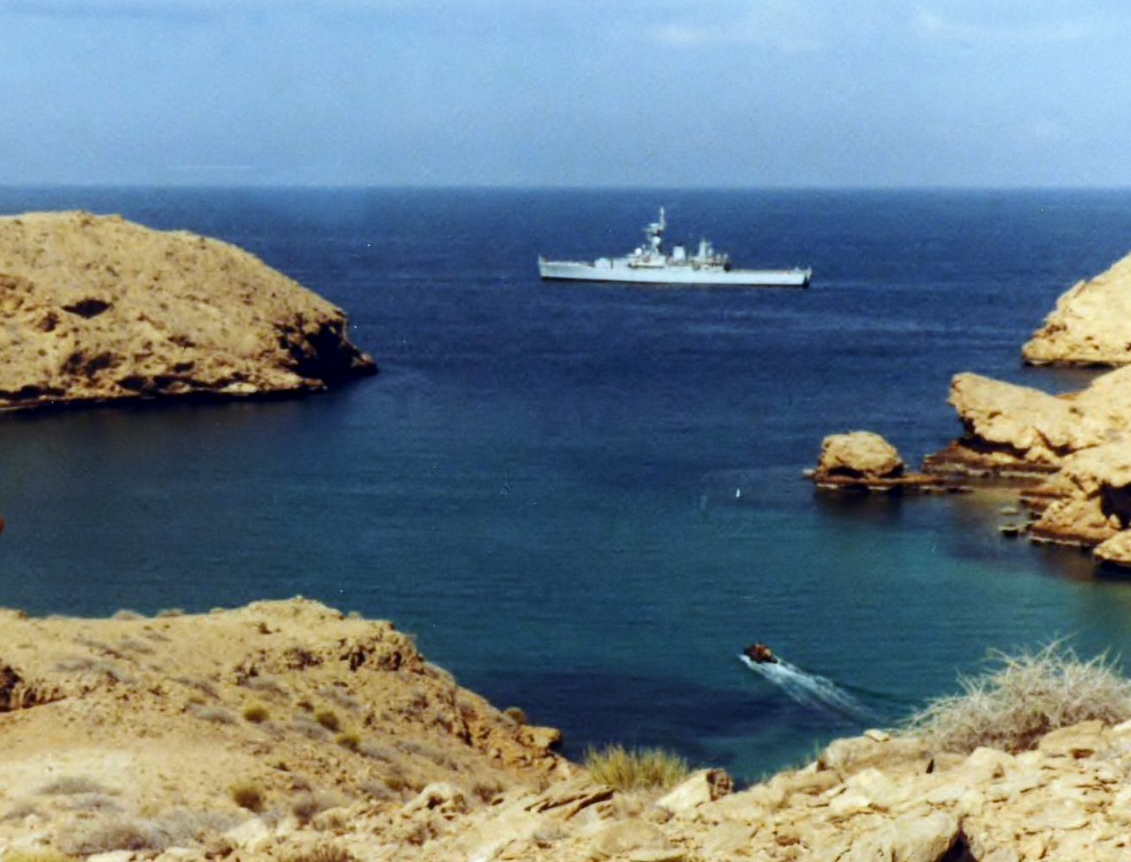
HMS Naiad (F39) off Bandar Khayran, Oman for ship's company 'banyan'.

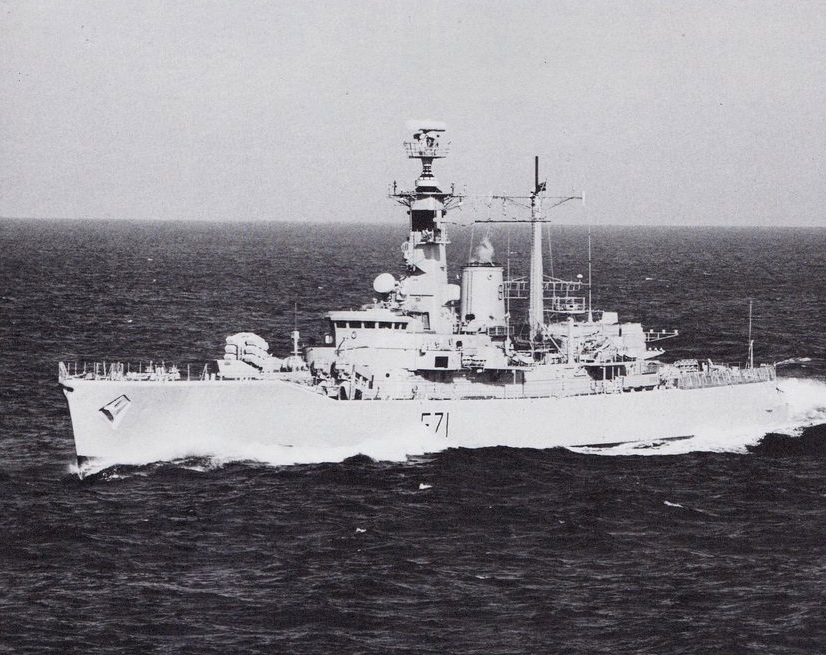
HMS Scylla (F71) in the Persian Gulf, circa in 1988.

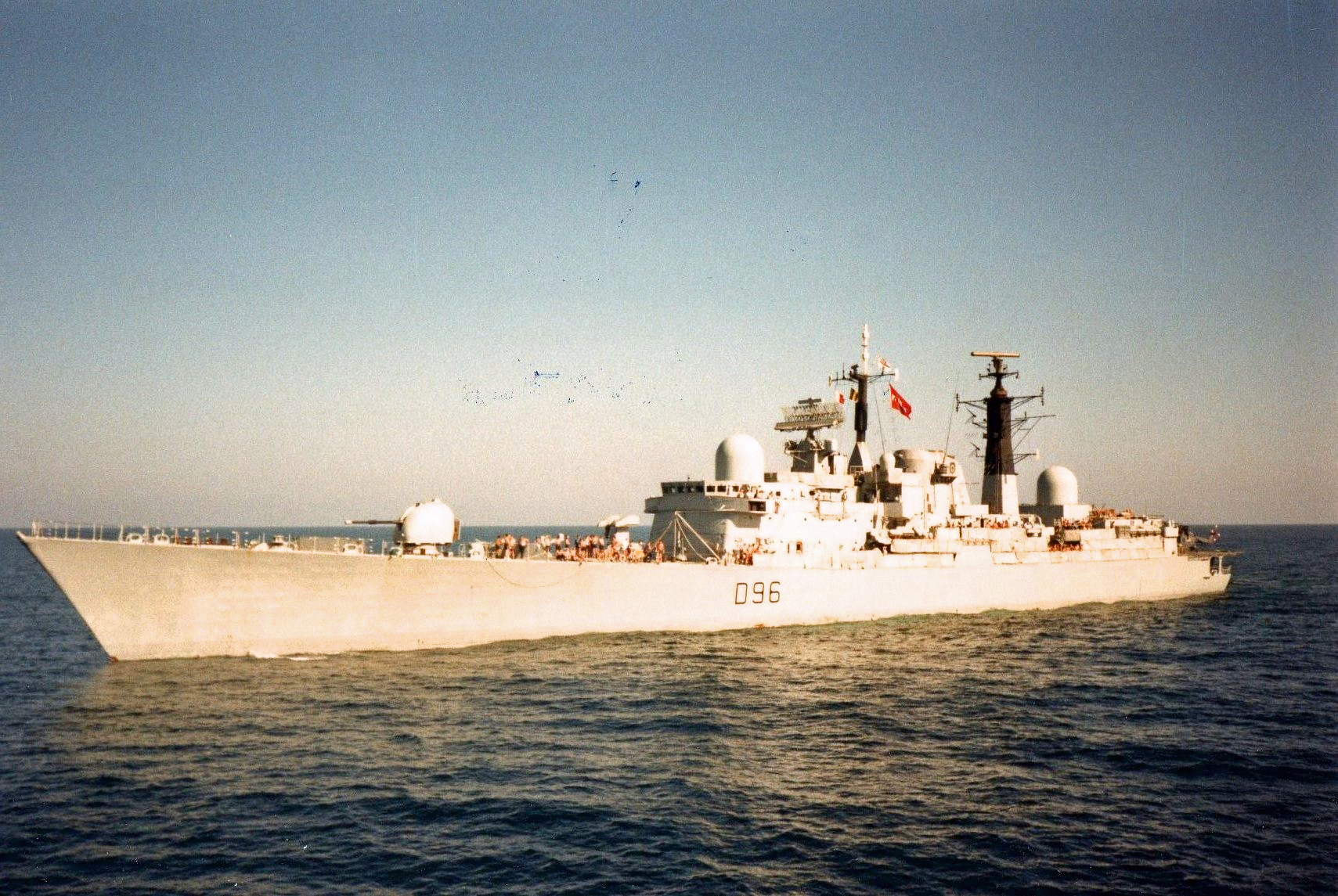
HMS Gloucester relieving HMS Nottingham circa March 1987

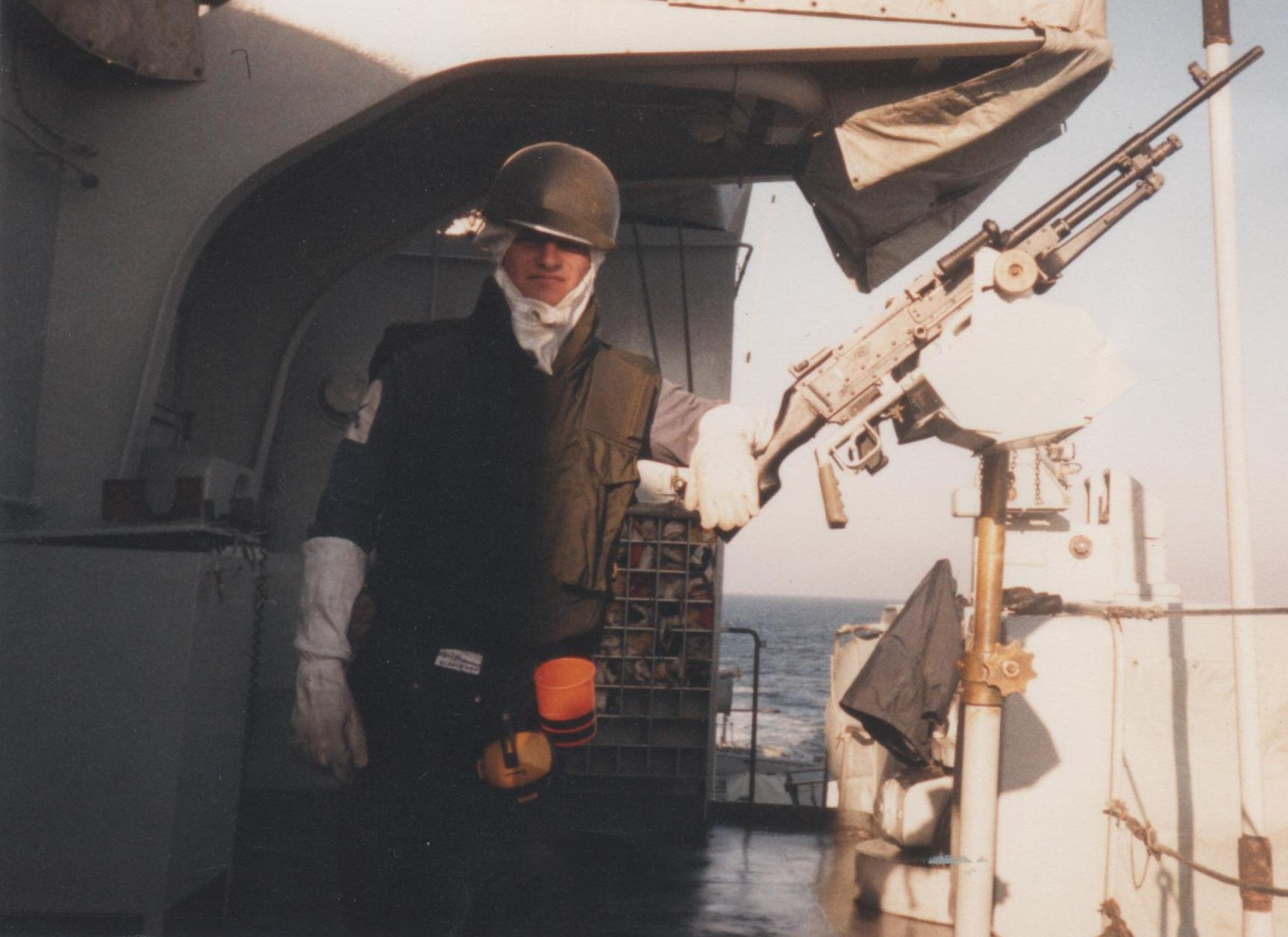
Ships Company at Defence Watches on HMS Nottingham January 1987

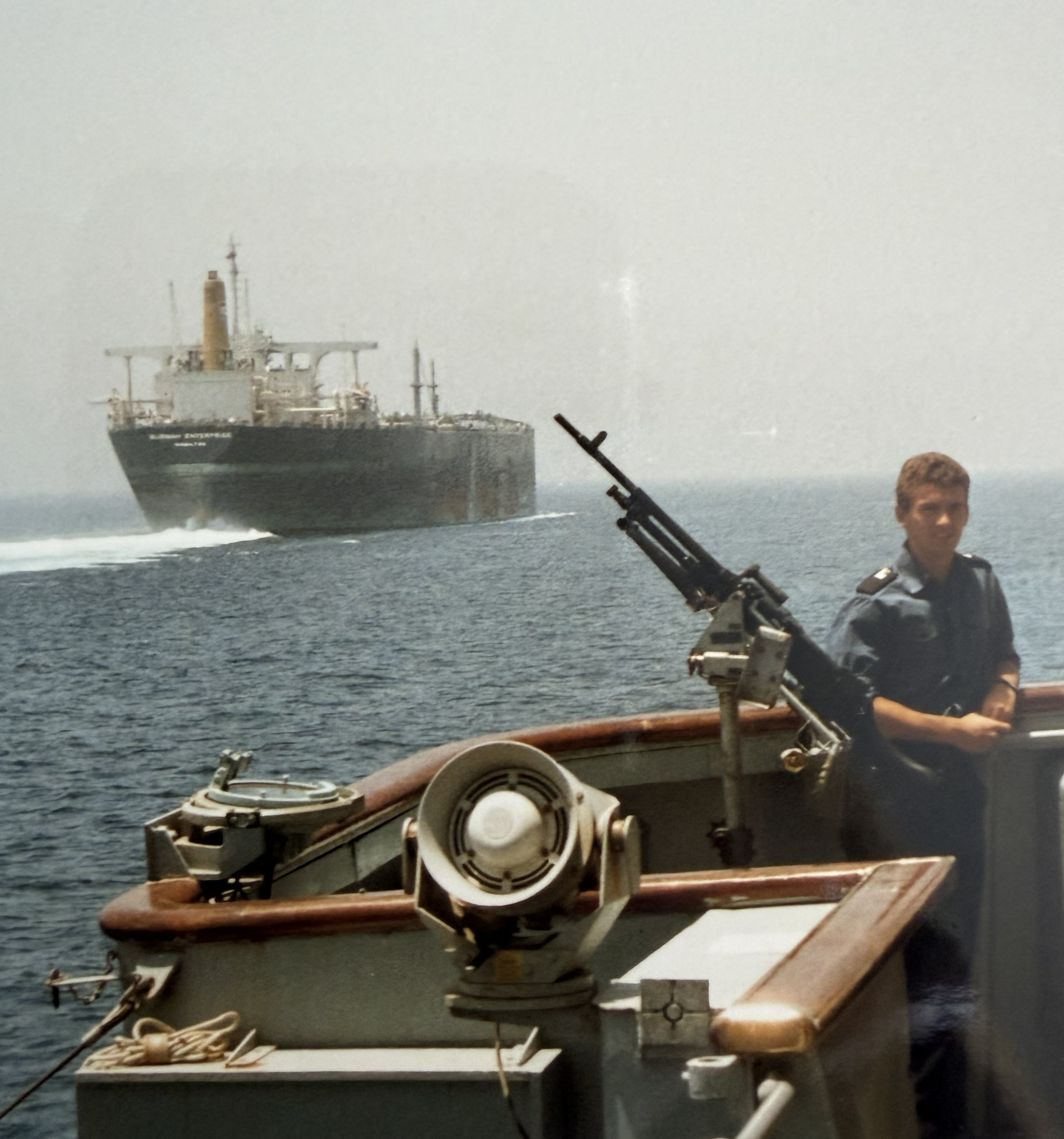
HMS Cardiff (D108) at defence watches, escorting Burmah Enterprise through Hormuz, June 1987.

Armilla patrol was the name of the Royal Navy's continuous rotational presence in the Persian Gulf during the 1980s and 1990s.

== Background ==
The Royal Navy withdrew its forces from the Persian Gulf in 1971 (the former Flag Officer, Middle East, and Senior Naval Officer, Persian Gulf) in line with the United Kingdom's general retreat from "East of Suez". However, tensions in the area remained high and Royal Navy ships were still a frequent sight in the area. In 1980, tensions in the Middle East led to the outbreak of war between Iraq and Iran. In response to what became known as the Tanker War and increased danger to British shipping and other British interests, in the Persian Gulf, the Armilla Patrol was established. HMS Coventry, and HMS Naiad; and later HMS Antrim and HMS Alacrity, were the first ships to patrol the Gulf of Oman and the Straits of Hormuz. There has been at least one Royal Navy ship on patrol in the area ever since. In addition to the surface combatant, the Royal Navy has also maintained an auxiliary of the Royal Fleet Auxiliary (RFA) in the Persian Gulf.

During the Falklands War, the Royal New Zealand Navy dispatched frigates to carry out the Armilla patrol duties, freeing the British ships on station for service with the Royal Navy task force tasked with freeing the Falkland Islands from the Argentine invasion.

The Armilla patrol was praised by British Prime Minister Margaret Thatcher and a call was made in parliament for an Armilla Patrol Medal to go to those serving in the Patrol at the time in 1989. Ships Companies were subsequently awarded the General Service Medal (Gulf) for patrol and escort duties between 17 November 1986 and 31 October 1988. Mine countermeasures ships were awarded the GSM for service between 1 November 1988 until 28 February 1989.

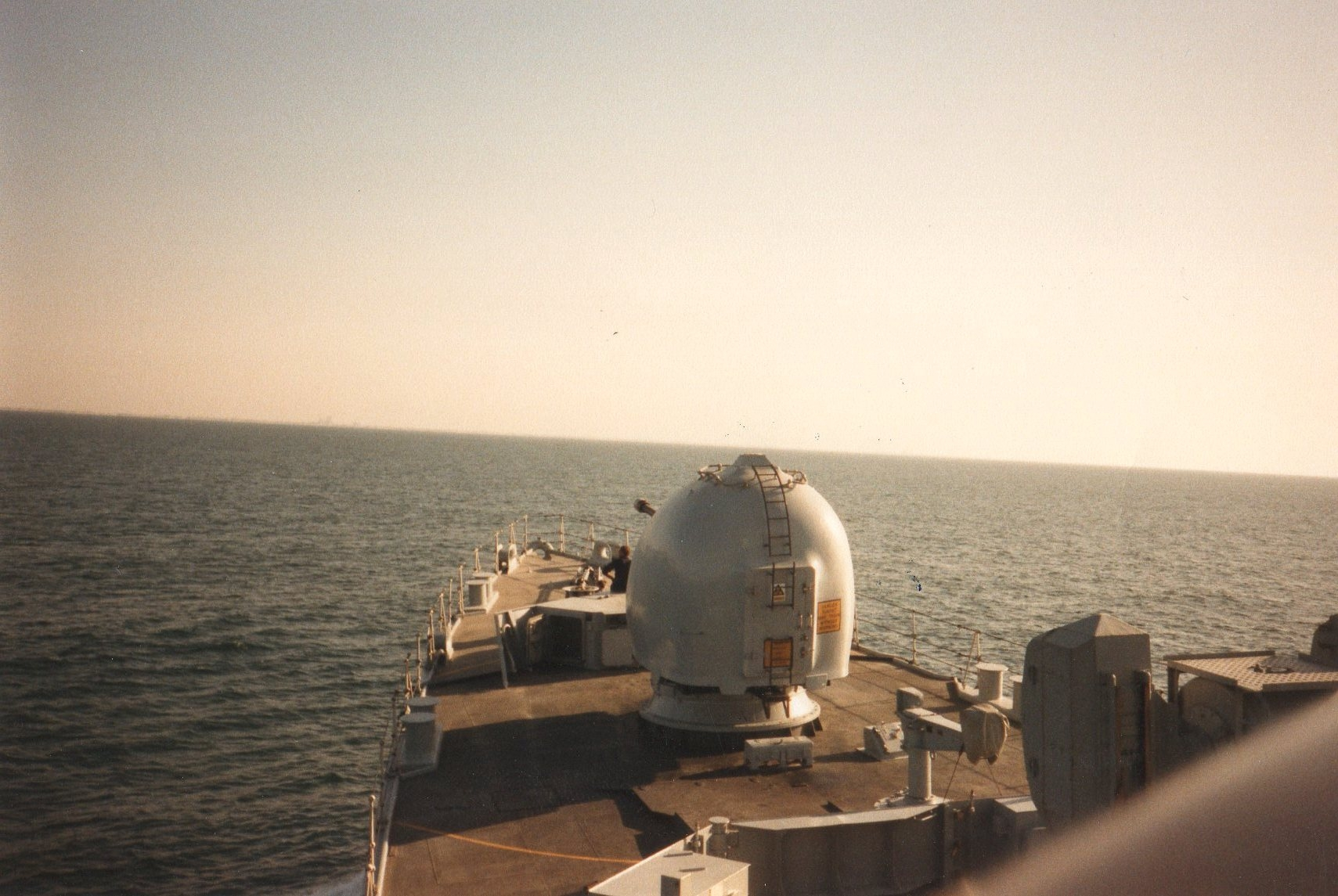
View from the bridge of HMS Nottingham during Defence Watches November 1986

Typical Armilla patrol deployments lasted for six months or so, with the supporting RFA vessel sometimes spending an aggregate total of over a year in the area. The patrol was reinforced with an aircraft carrier or task group in times of high tension or British involvement in wartime operations or by frigates or destroyers transiting the area for other operations in the Far East or Pacific.

The largest British presence in the Persian Gulf during the Armilla patrol was during the two operations against Iraq. In 1991, eight Royal Navy ships supported by a number of RFA vessels were sent to the area.

== Post 1990s ==
In 2003, over 30 British warships and auxiliaries were involved in the invasion of Iraq. A number of vessels, including minesweepers, survey vessels and submarines, were periodically rotated through the area to provide additional capability.

Beginning in 2006 the surface combatant deployed was tasked with patrol in the Persian Gulf and as part of Operation Oracle, the United Kingdom's assistance to the United States in its operations in the Arabian Sea, along with flexibility in tasking for operations in the Far East and Pacific.

== Operations ==
Armilla was designated by Northwood as Task Group 321.1. The incoming and outgoing units were designated TU 321.1.2, with the on-station ships being TU 321.1.3. The designation of the TG remained constant throughout.

Deploying ships were assigned to the following 'groups'

Group Alfa: Group Bravo: Group Charlie: Group Delta: Group Echo: Group Foxtrot: Group Golf: Group Hotel: Group India: Group Juliet: Group Kilo: Group Lima: (1987) HMS Broadsword (CTG), HNS Active, HMS Cardiff Group Mike: Group November: Group Oscar: Groups Papa: Group Quebec: Group Romeo: Group Sierra: Group Tango: (1989) HMS Brave (CTG), HMS London, HMS Nottingham

== See also ==
- Standing Royal Navy deployments
