= Naval Officer-in-Charge, Aden =

Aden Station
- Active: 1839–1959
- Country: United Kingdom
- Allegiance: British Empire
- Branch: Royal Navy
- Part of: East Indies Station (1839-1917); Red Sea Station (1917-1920); East Indies Station (1921-1935); Mediterranean Fleet (1935-1938); East Indies Station (1939-1943); Levant Command (1943-1944); East Indies Station (1945); Flag Officer, Middle East (1946-1958)
- Garrison/HQ: HMS Sheba; Steamer Point, Aden; Aden Protectorate (1839-1937)

The Naval Officer-in-Charge, Aden, was an administrative appointment of British Royal Navy originally established in 1839 as the Senior Naval Officer, Aden. He was responsible for HMS Sheba. It was a sub-command of the Flag Officer, Middle East.

== History ==
In 1839 the Royal Navy carried out an operation called the Aden Expedition led by Captain Henry Smith under orders from the Commander-in-Chief, East Indies, in the south east Arabian Peninsula its occupation of Aden was mainly for strategic reasons as Aden provided control of the entrance to the Red Sea a naval base was first established here at the same time. In 1869 the Suez Canal was opened and the British Empire established a number of protectorates in Southern Arabia mainly as a shield against further expansion by the Ottoman Empire who were occupying the rest of Yemen. In the 19th century and early twentieth century it was a major coaling station that sat on an important trade route from India. During World War Two the main naval formation based in Aden was the Red Sea Force.

== In command before the First World War ==
=== Senior Naval Officer, Aden ===
| | Rank | Flag | Name | Term | Notes/Ref |
|---|---|---|---|---|---|
Senior Naval Officer, Aden
| 1 | Captain | | Henry Smith | 1839 | later Admiral. |

=== Senior Naval Officer, Aden Division ===
| | Rank | Flag | Name | Term | Notes/Ref |
|---|---|---|---|---|---|
Senior Naval Officer, Aden Division
| 1 | Commander | | E. R. Pears | 1904 | |
| 2 | Captain | | J. B. Eustace | 1905 | |

=== Naval Transport Officer in Charge ===
| | Rank | Flag | Name | Term | Notes/Ref |
|---|---|---|---|---|---|
Naval Transport Officer-in-Charge, Aden
| 1 | Commander | | Charles A. Scott | 1919 | |

== In command inter-war period and Second World War ==
=== Naval Officer-in-Charge, Aden ===
| | Rank | Flag | Name | Term | Notes/Ref |
|---|---|---|---|---|---|
Naval Officer-in-Charge, Aden & Commanding Officer, HMS Sheba (RN Base, Aden)
| 1 | Captain | | Douglas B. Fisher | 15 September 1935 – 29 June 1936 | |
| 2 | Acting-Captain | | P.L. Gunn | 8 July 1939 – 29 May 1942 | |
| 3 | Commodore | | C.A.A. Larcom | 29 May 1942 – February, 1943 | retired |
| 4 | Commodore | | Fitzroy.E.P. Hutton | 28 August – December, 1943 | ditto |
| 5 | Commodore | | E. A Aylmer | 25 March 1944 – July, 1945 | |
| 6 | Captain | | Waldemar W. P. Shirley-Rollison | 1945 - 1946 | |

== Sources ==
- Anderson, Ewan W. (2014). Global Geopolitical Flashpoints : an Atlas of Conflict. London, England: Taylor and Francis, Routledge. ISBN 9781135940942.
- Bertke, Donald A.; Kindell, Don; Smith, Gordon (2011). WORLD WAR II SEA WAR: FRANCE FALLS, BRITAIN STANDS ALONE: Day-to-Day Naval Actions from April 1940 through September 1940. Lulu Bertke Publishing. ISBN 9781937470005.
- Campbell, Gwyn (10 January 2018). Bondage and the environment in the Indian Ocean world. New York, NY, USA: Springer Publishing. p. 248. ISBN 9783319700281
- Clowes, W. Laird (William Laird); Markham, Clements R. (Clements Robert); Mahan, A. T. (Alfred Thayer); Wilson, Herbert Wrigley.(1897–1903) The royal navy, a history from the earliest times to present. London : S. Low, Marston, Co.
- "Flag Officers in Commission". The Navy List. London, England: H. M.Stationery Office. October 1944.
- Fevyer, W. H.; Wilson, J. W. (2012). Africa General Service Medal: to the Royal Navy and the Royal Marines. Luton, England: Andrews UK Limited. ISBN 9781781504314.
- Harley, Simon; Lovell, Tony (21 August 2018). "Aden - The Dreadnought Project". www.dreadnoughtproject.org. Harley and Lovell. Retrieved 1 October 2018.
- Houterman, J.N. "Royal Navy (RN) Officers 1939-1945 - S". www.unithistories.com. Houterman and Koppes.
- Innes-Robbins, Simon (2018). "A Short History Of The Aden Emergency". Imperial War Museums. London, England: Imperial War Museums. Retrieved 1 October 2018.
- Niehorster, Leo. "World War II unit histories & officers". www.unithistories.com. L. Niehorster. Retrieved 3 July 2018.
- Ram, Krishnamurthy Venkat (2009). "Conclusion". Anglo-Ethiopian Relations, 1869 to 1906: A Study of British Policy in Ethiopia. New Delhi, India: Concept Publishing Company. ISBN 9788180696244.
