= Anthony Miers =

World War II Victoria Cross recipient (1906–1985)

Rear-Admiral Sir Anthony Miers VC KBE CB DSO & Bar
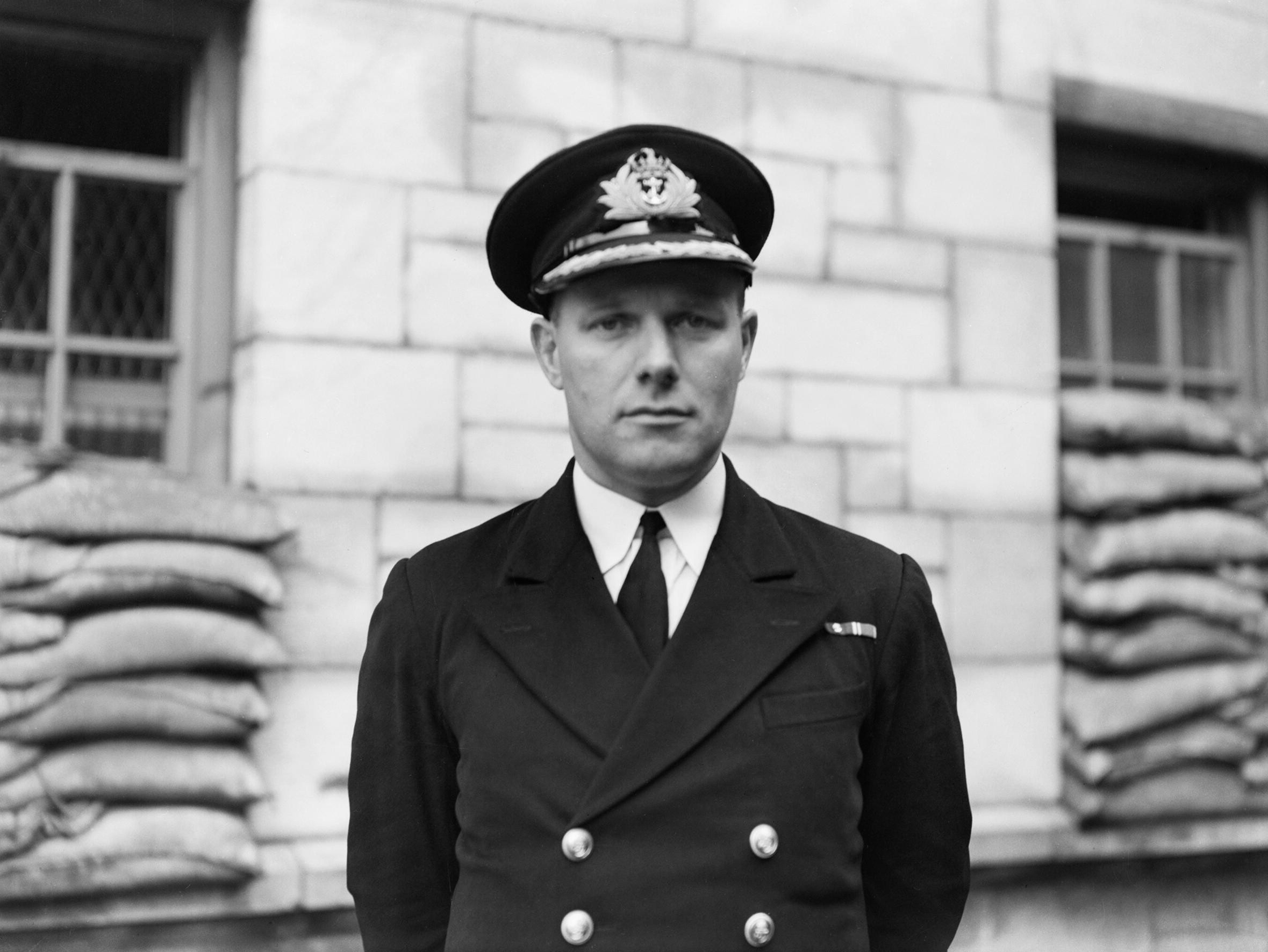
- Anthony Miers
- Born: 11 November 1906; Inverness, Scotland
- Died: 30 June 1985 (aged 78); Inverness, Scotland
- Burial place: Tomnahurich Cemetery, Inverness
- Military career
- Allegiance: United Kingdom
- Branch: Royal Navy
- Service years: 1924–1959
- Rank: Rear-Admiral
- Nickname: Crap Miers
- Commands: Flag Officer, Middle East (1956–59); HMS Theseus (1954–55); Royal Naval College, Greenwich (1952–54); 1st Submarine Flotilla (1950–52); HMS Forth (1950–52); HMS Blackcap (1948–50); HMS Vernon (1946); HMS Torbay (1940–42); HMS L54 (1936–37)
- Conflicts: Second World War
- Awards: Victoria Cross; Knight Commander of the Order of the British Empire; Companion of the Order of the Bath; Distinguished Service Order & Bar; Mentioned in Despatches; Legion of Merit (United States)

Rear-Admiral Sir Anthony Cecil Capel Miers, VC, KBE, CB, DSO & Bar (11 November 1906 – 30 June 1985), known as "Crap Miers" and "Gamp", was a Royal Navy officer who served in the submarine service during the Second World War.

Miers was a recipient of the Victoria Cross, the highest and most prestigious award for gallantry in the face of the enemy that can be awarded to British and Commonwealth forces. He was allegedly responsible for two war crime incidents, while commanding HMS Torbay, including the shooting of seven Germans in a life raft.

== Early life ==
Born in 1906 in Inverness, Scotland, the son of an army captain killed in the First World War, Miers was educated at Stubbington House School in Gosport, Edinburgh Academy, and Wellington College. In 1924 he joined the Royal Navy as a special entry cadet and volunteered for the submarine service in 1929. He could be hot-tempered, and in 1933 was court martialled for striking a rating. Miers' career however continued, with HMS L54 his first submarine command (1936–7). He then served in the battleship HMS Iron Duke, before joining, as a lieutenant commander, the staff of the commander-in-chief, Home Fleet (1939–40), where he was mentioned in despatches.

== War service ==
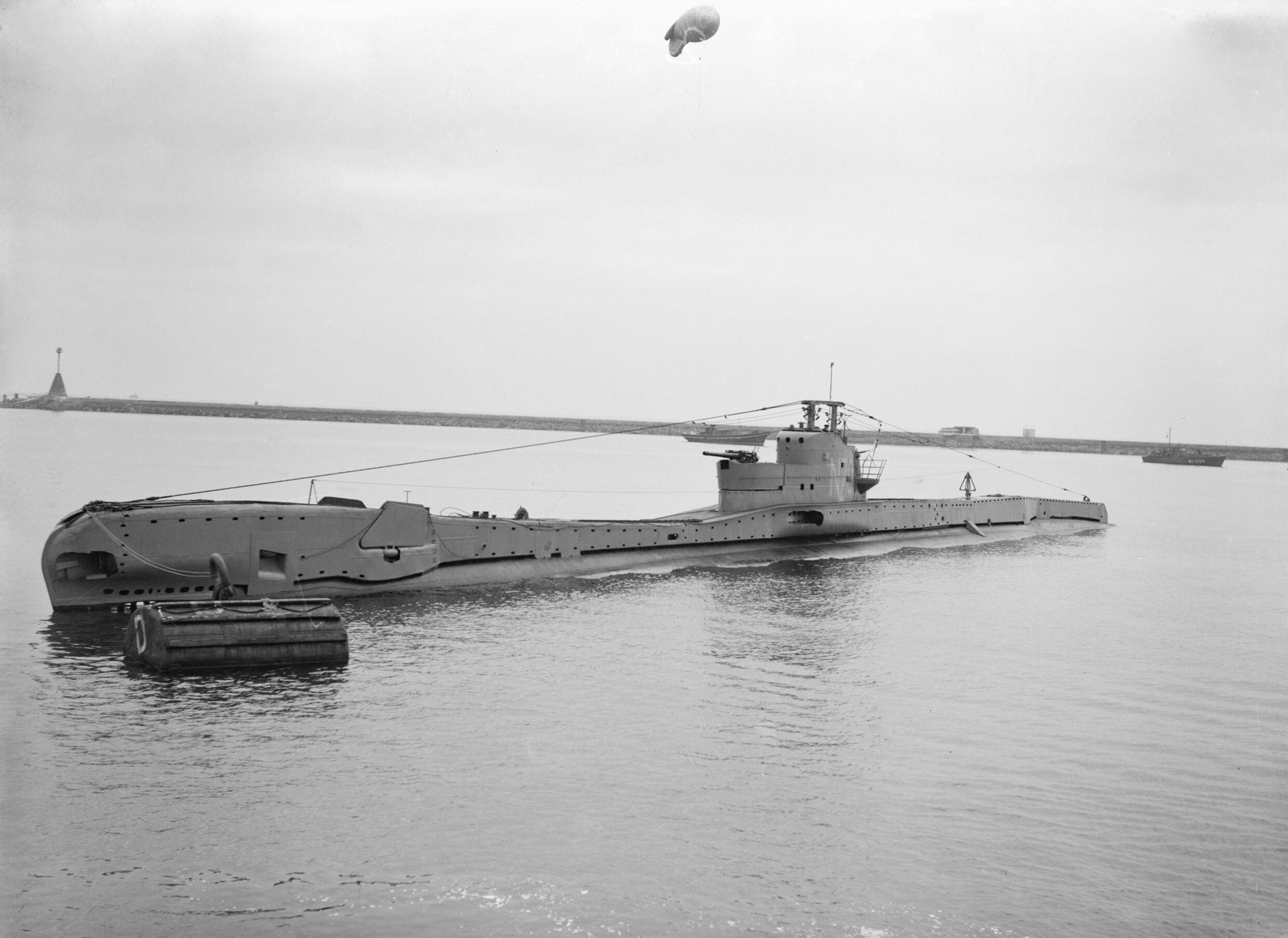
HMS Torbay in 1943

In November 1940 Miers was given command of HM Submarine Torbay. While working up, Torbay collided with the British tanker Vancouver in Loch Long though no serious damage was caused.

Torbay began its first patrol in March 1941. The submarine left at very short notice, with half the crew on leave and replaced by members of the spare crew of the depot ship, the reason being that the German battleships Scharnhorst and Gneisenau had arrived at Brest and the Royal Navy wanted them shadowed in case they sailed for the Atlantic sea lanes. The submarine later continued to Gibraltar, then Alexandria, Egypt to join the 1st Submarine Flotilla.

On 27 April 1941, while on patrol off Cape Ferrato, Miers attacked a two-masted single-funnelled merchant ship of about 4,000 GRT. Torbay fired two torpedoes but both missed.

Torbay's third war patrol was in the northern Aegean Sea. On 28 May 1941, Torbay sank two Greek caiques with gunfire, then torpedoed and damaged the Vichy French tanker Alberta off Cape Hellas.

In 1989 former Royal Naval officer and broadcaster Ludovic Kennedy published his autobiography, in which he describes "a submarine atrocity" on the night of 9 July 1941, which gave rise to the accusation of war crimes. According to the accounts, on two separate occasions Miers ordered the machine-gunning of several shipwrecked German soldiers in rafts who had jumped overboard when their vessels were sunk by the Torbay. These events were witnessed and reported by acting First Lieutenant Paul Chapman who reported "everything and everybody was destroyed by one sort of gunfire or another". Miers also made no attempt to conceal his actions, his patrol log recording: "Submarine cast off, and with the Lewis gun accounted for the soldiers in the rubber raft to prevent them from regaining their ship..." When informed of Miers' actions, Flag Officer Submarines, Admiral Max Horton wrote to the Admiralty about the possibility of German reprisals: "As far as I am aware, the enemy has not made a habit of firing on personnel in the water or on rafts even when such personnel were members of the fighting services; since the incidents referred to in Torbay's report, he may feel justified in doing so." The Admiralty then sent a strongly worded letter to Miers advising him not to repeat the practices of his last patrol.

According to historian Alfred-Maurice de Zayas in his 1979 work The Wehrmacht War Crimes Bureau, 1939–1945, the incident was one of several instances of the Royal Navy sinking Greek ships believed to be transporting German soldiers and then firing on survivors in the water or in lifeboats. All reports of such incidents were investigated by the Wehrmacht War Crimes Bureau, which collected depositions from surviving German and Greek witnesses supporting Kennedy's claims regarding the incident.

By now, Miers had carried out nine successful patrols in HMS Torbay in the Mediterranean theatre, had received the Distinguished Service Order and Bar, and had been promoted to commander in December 1941. His tenth patrol in HMS Torbay in March 1942 saw the incident which earned him the VC. Whilst on patrol in Torbay off the Greek coast on the 4 March 1942, Miers sighted a northbound convoy of four troopships entering the South Corfu Channel and, since they had been too far distant for him to attack initially, he decided to follow in the hope of catching them in Corfu harbour. During the night 4/5 March, Torbay approached undetected up the channel and remained on the surface charging her battery. The convoy passed straight through the channel but on the morning of the 5 March, in glassy sea conditions, Miers successfully attacked two store ships present in the roadstead and then brought Torbay safely back to the open sea. The submarine endured 40 depth charges and had been in closely patrolled enemy waters for seventeen hours.

The citation in the London Gazette read:

Commander Anthony Cecil Capel Miers DSO, Royal Navy:
For valour in command of H.M. Submarine Torbay in a daring and successful raid on shipping in a defended enemy harbour, planned with full knowledge of the great hazards to be expected during seventeen hours in waters closely patrolled by the enemy. On arriving in the harbour, he had to charge his batteries lying on the surface in full moonlight, under the guns of the enemy. As he could not see his target, he waited several hours and attacked in full daylight in a glassy calm. When he had fired his torpedoes he was heavily counter-attacked and had to withdraw through a long channel with anti-submarine craft all round and continuous air patrols overhead.

His VC is on display in the Lord Ashcroft Gallery at the Imperial War Museum, London.

From December 1942 Miers served as submarine liaison officer to the American Pacific Fleet, and was later made a commander of the US Legion of Merit. From July 1944 he was Commander (Submarines) of the 8th Submarine Flotilla in the Far East based at Trincomalee, Sri Lanka and later Fremantle, Australia.

== Post war ==
Miers remained in the navy after the war, and was promoted to captain in December 1946. He was commanding officer of the naval establishments HMS Vernon and then HMS Blackcap, a Fleet Air Arm station (1948–50), HMS Forth and the 1st submarine squadron (1950–52), and the Royal Naval College, Greenwich (1952–4). He commanded the aircraft carrier HMS Theseus for a year from 9 December 1954. He was promoted to rear admiral in January 1956, and became Flag Officer, Middle East, until his retirement in August 1959. He was appointed a Companion of the Order of the Bath (CB) in 1958, and Knight Commander of the Order of the British Empire (KBE) in 1959.

Miers served for many years as the national president of the Submarine Old Comrades' Association. He died at his home in Roehampton, London, on 30 June 1985. He is buried at Tomnahurich Cemetery, Inverness, Scotland, in the Roman Catholic Section.
