= Wilfred McClaughry =

Royal Air Force Air Vice-Marshal (1894-1943)

Wilfred Ashton McClaughry
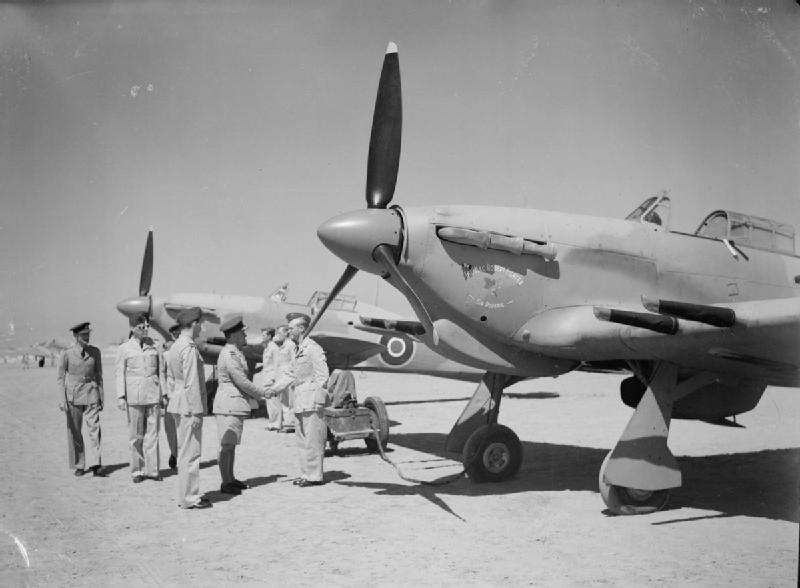
- Air Vice Marshal McClaughry formally hands over four Hawker Hurricane Mark IICs to No. 94 Squadron RAF at El Gamil, Egypt.
- Born: Wilfred Ashton McCloughry; 26 November 1894; Adelaide, Australia
- Died: 4 January 1943 (aged 48); Cairo, Egypt
- Relatives: Edgar McCloughry (brother)
- Military career
- Allegiance: Australia (1913–16); United Kingdom (1916–43)
- Branch: Australian Imperial Force; Royal Flying Corps; Royal Air Force
- Service years: 1913–1943
- Rank: Air Vice Marshal
- Commands: AHQ Egypt (1942–43); No. 9 (Fighter) Group (1940–42); British Forces Aden (1936–38); RAF Mersa Matruh (1935–36); RAF Heliopolis (1934–35); No. 8 Squadron RAF (1924–28); No. 8 (Training) Squadron AFC (1918–19); No. 4 Squadron AFC (1917–18)
- Conflicts: First World War; Second World War
- Awards: Companion of the Order of the Bath; Distinguished Service Order; Military Cross; Distinguished Flying Cross; Mentioned in Despatches (3)

Air Vice Marshal Wilfred Ashton McClaughry, CB, DSO, MC, DFC (26 November 1894 – 4 January 1943), born Wilfred Ashton McCloughry, was an Australian aviator and air commander who served in the Australian Flying Corps during the First World War and Royal Air Force in the Second World War. His senior commands included: British Forces Aden (1930s), and; No. 9 Group RAF, and Air Officer Commanding Air Officer Commanding Allied Headquarters Egypt (both during the Second World War). McClaughry was killed, while a passenger, in a flying accident in Cairo in 1943.

== Military career ==
McClaughry was educated at Queen's College North Adelaide and the University of Adelaide. McClaughry joined the Militia in 1913 and served in the First World War with the 9th Light Horse Regiment, before transferring to the Royal Flying Corps (RFC) in 1916. He was appointed Officer Commanding No. 4 Squadron AFC (known in British circles as "71 Squadron") in October 2017.

After the war he joined the Royal Air Force and became Officer Commanding the Air Pilotage School in 1921. He was appointed Officer Commanding No. 8 Squadron in 1924 and then spent three years as a staff officer at Headquarters Wessex Bombing Area. McClaughry went on to be Station Commander at RAF Heliopolis in 1934 and Station Commander at RAF Mersa Matruh in 1934 before becoming Air Officer Commanding British Forces Aden in 1936. He became Director of Training at the Air Ministry in 1938.

McClaughry served in the Second World War as Air Officer Commanding No. 9 Group, a fighter group, during the Battle of Britain and then as Air Officer Commanding AHQ Egypt before being killed in an air accident in Cairo in 1943. He was buried at Heliopolis War Cemetery.

== Family ==
In 1940 McClaughry married Angela Grace Maria Segalir. His brother, Air Vice Marshal Edgar Kingston-McCloughry (who hyphenated his surname) also had a distinguished career in both the AFC and RAF.

Military offices
Preceded by Leslie Gossage	Air Officer Commanding British Forces Aden; 1936–1938	Succeeded by George Reid
Recreated Title last held by Harold Briggs in 1919	Air Officer Commanding No. 9 (Fighter) Group; 1940–1942	Succeeded by Leonard Slatter
