= RAF Hiswa =

RAF Hiswa RNAS Hiswa (HMS Rapax)
- Hiswa, Aden, Aden Governorate in Yemen
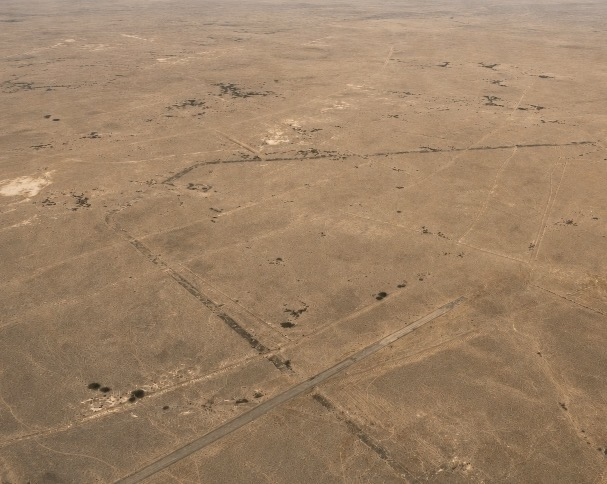
- An aerial photograph showing the long defunct RAF Hiswa: its perimeter taxiway are still present along with a faint runway.

Site information
- Type: Royal Air Force station
- Owner: Air Ministry
- Operator: Royal Air Force
- Controlled by: AHQ Aden

Location
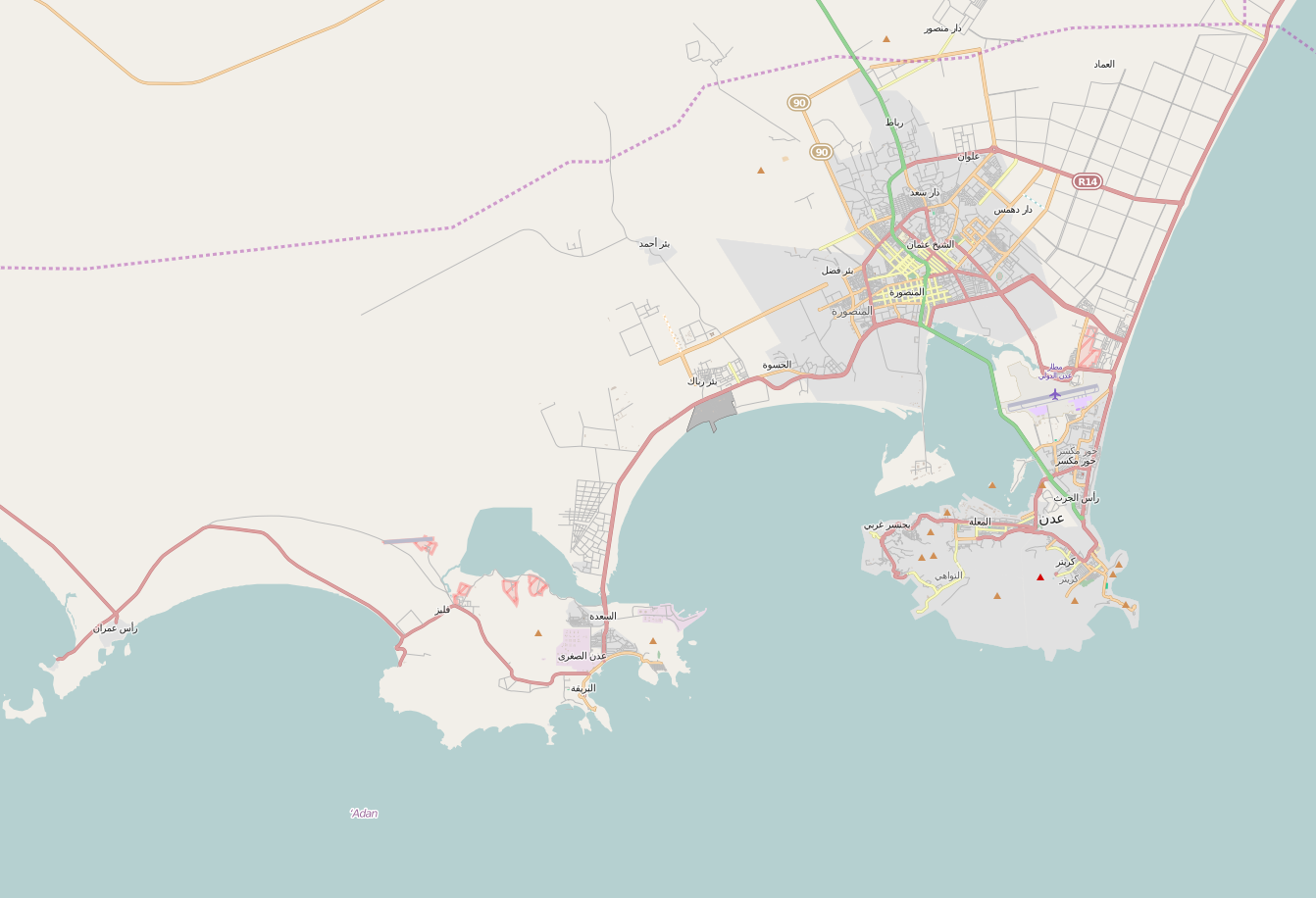
- Shown within Yemen RAF Hiswa (Yemen)
- Coordinates: 12°49′31″N 44°54′14″E

Site history
- Built: 1941
- In use: 1941-1967
- Battles/wars: Mediterranean and Middle East theatre of World War II

Royal Air Force Hiswa or more simply RAF Hiswa is a former Royal Air Force station located within Hiswa, Aden, Aden Governorate, Yemen.

== History ==
In 1941, an Air Ministry Experimental Station was established at Hiswa. An Operational Training Unit was established at Hiswa in 1942.

=== Flight 1566 (Meteorological Flight) ===
On 25th March 1944, No. 1566 Meteorological Flight was officially formed at RAF Station Hiswa. Commanded by Lieutenant P.D. White, the unit consisted of 4 Hurricane Mark IIBs, and 10 supporting airmen. Following six months of operations, Flight 1566 was moved to RAF Khormaksar on 4th September 1944.

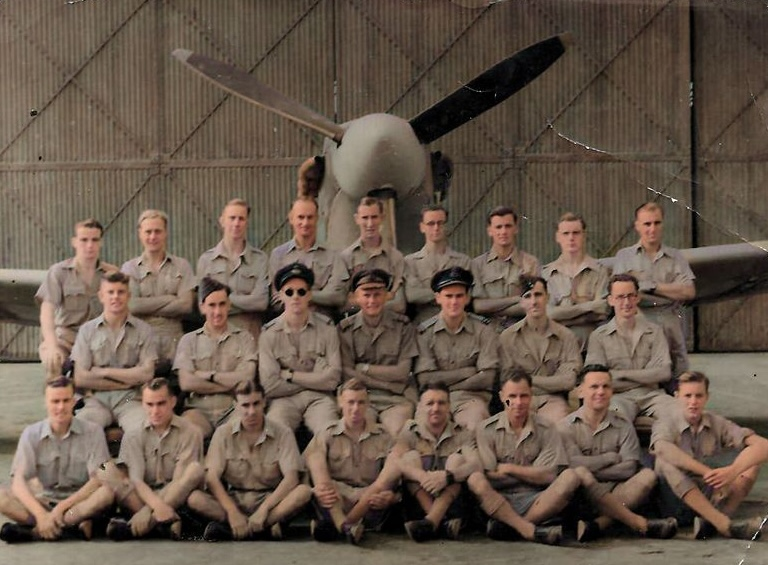
Aircraft support crew, Meteorological Flight 1566

=== HMS Rapax ===
In December 1944, control was transferred to the Admiralty, and Hiswa was developed into a Royal Naval Air Station, commissioned as HMS Rapax. It was developed to accommodate two and a half operational squadrons, featuring reserve aircraft storage. The airfield was equipped with two intersecting, all-weather Gypsum laid runways: runway 05/23 measuring 1970 yards long and 13/31 measuring 2000 yards long. There were six hardstands, four Mainhill and two Bellmen hangars, and one ERS hangar. It was equipped with two windsocks, to the east and to the west of the runway intersection. There were no visual approach aids at day, although there were mobile beacon lights, paraffin flares, grim lamps, and angle of glide indicators at night. Communication equipment included 6 transmitters and 6 receivers for M/F and H/F, and 2 transmitters and 2 receivers for VH/F. Facilities included a control, building on the southern side of the landing area, 180 yards south of the runway intersection. Personnel were accommodated in temporary bungalow huts positioned south of the landing area, with a capacity of 99 officers and 641 chiefs, P.O.s and ratings.

=== Post-war ===
In June 1945, RAF Hiswa was placed under Care & Maintenance status, remaining as a War Reserve airfield until the mid-1950s. With its airfield closed, RAF Hiswa remained as transmitter and communications station. To further improve the link between Khon Bir Ahmed, Hiswa Airfield, and Khormaksar, a new road was developed. In the area, a new road was developed which went around the Indo-Aden Salt Works, avoiding sand dunes that drifted over existing roads. The whole 10 miles of the road had cost £120,000, chargeable to the government. In 1960, all transmitters were specialised to the station, including high-frequency radio telephonies from RAF Khormaksar being transferred. Accommodation was made ready for the inclusion of radio teletype (RTT) equipment in pursuance of an ICAO recommendation, providing an RTT service between Aden and East Africa by 1961.

== Closure ==
During the British withdrawal of Aden, all communications facilities and equipment at RAF Hiswa were dismantled and transferred to RAF Khormaksar by 1 September 1967. The only facilities that remained at RAF Hiswa were a CRDF and the NDB as required by Federal Authorities.

== Units ==
- No. 304 AMES
- No. 17 Squadron SAAF during June 1943
- No. 1566 Meteorological Flight during March to September 1944
- Armoured Car Section during 1944

== See also ==
- RAF Sheikh Othman - another station merely 8.8km northeast from Hiswa
- HMS Sheba - another Royal Navy installation in Aden
