= Naval station =

Naval organisation

A naval station is a former geographic command of the Royal Navy that was responsible for conducting all naval operations within its defined area. It could consist of fleets, flotillas, squadrons, or individual ships under its command. The Royal Navy's network of naval stations covered the whole of the earth's surface, consisting of areas of responsibility ranging from the size of seas to oceans. They were under the command of a commander-in-chief, usually a rear or vice admiral.

== List of naval stations ==
- North America and West Indies Station (1745-1976)
- Persian Gulf Station (1818-1972)
- Far East Station (1952-1971)
- Mediterranean Station (1654-1967)
- South Atlantic Station (1939-1967)
- East Indies Station (1744-1958)
- Red Sea Station (1846-1944)
- China Station (1865-1941)
- East Indies and China Station (1831-1865)
- Africa Station (1920-1940)
- Australia Station (1859-1913)
- Pacific Station (1837-1905)
- South East Coast of America Station (1838-1905)
- East Indies and Cape of Good Hope Station (1865-1867)
- West Africa Station (1819-1857, 1866-1867)
- Cape of Good Hope and West Africa Station (1857-1865, 1867-1920)
- Cape of Good Hope Station (1795-1857)
- Lisbon Station (1779-1782, 1795-1841)
- South America Station (1808-1838)

== United States usage ==
The United States Department of the Navy's General Order No 135 issued in 1911 as a formal guide to Naval Terms described a Naval Station as "any establishment for building, manufacturing, docking, repair, supply, or training under control of the Navy. It may also include several establishments". A Naval Base by contrast was "a point from which naval operations may be conducted"

== See also ==
- Royal Navy
- Admiralty (United Kingdom)
- List of fleets and major commands of the Royal Navy
