= David Lee (RAF officer) =

Air Chief Marshal Sir David Lee GBE CB
- Born: 4 September 1912; Luton, Bedfordshire, England
- Died: 13 February 2004 (aged 91); Swindon, Wiltshire, England
- Military career
- Allegiance: United Kingdom
- Branch: Royal Air Force
- Service years: 1930–1971
- Rank: Air Chief Marshal
- Commands: Air Member for Personnel (1965–68); RAF Staff College, Bracknell (1962–65); Air Forces Middle East (1959–61); RAF Scampton (1953–56); No. 904 Wing (1945–46)
- Conflicts: Second World War
- Awards: Knight Grand Cross of the Order of the British Empire; Companion of the Order of the Bath

Air Chief Marshal Sir David John Pryer Lee GBE CB (4 September 1912 – 13 February 2004) was a Royal Air Force officer during the Second World War and a senior commander in the 1950s and early 1960s.

== RAF career ==
Educated at Bedford School, Lee joined the Royal Air Force in 1930. He served in the Second World War as a pilot with No. 61 Squadron and then with No. 106 Squadron before becoming Deputy Director of Plans at the Air Ministry. He completed his war service as Officer Commanding No. 904 Wing in the Dutch East Indies where he was responsible for repatriating prisoners of war.

After the War he joined the Directing Staff at the RAF Staff College, Bracknell, and was then appointed Deputy Director, Policy at the Air Ministry before becoming Station Commander at RAF Scampton in 1953. He went on to be Secretary of the Chiefs of Staff Committee in 1956, Air Officer Commanding Air Forces Middle East in 1959 and Commandant of the RAF Staff College, Bracknell in 1962. He last appointments were as Air Member for Personnel in 1965 and UK Military Representative to NATO in 1968 before retiring in 1971.

== Personal life ==
In 1938 he married Denise Hartoch; they had a son and a daughter.

== Books ==
Lee wrote three official histories of the RAF overseas:

- Flight from the Middle East: A history of the Royal Air Force in the Arabian Peninsula and adjacent territories 1945–1972, HMSO 1980
- Eastward: A history of the Royal Air Force in the Far East 1945–1972, HMSO 1984
- Wings in the Sun: A history of the Royal Air Force in the Mediterranean 1945–1986, HMSO Books 1989

He also wrote two accounts of his own time in the RAF:

- Never Stop the Engine when it's Hot, Thomas Harmsworth Publishing 1983 – recounting his time as a junior officer flying Westland Wapitis between the wars on the NorthWest Frontier of India
- ...And We Thought the War Was Over, Thomas Harmsworth Publishing 1991 – about his time as CO of 904 Tactical Wing of P-47 Thunderbolts in the Dutch East Indies at the end of World War II

Military offices
Preceded by Maurice Heath	Commandant of the RAF Staff College, Bracknell; 1962–1965	Succeeded by Tim Piper
Preceded by Sir Walter Cheshire	Air Member for Personnel; 1965–1968	Succeeded by Sir Andrew Humphrey
Preceded by Sir Nigel Henderson	UK Military Representative to NATO; 1968–1971	Succeeded by Sir Victor FitzGeorge-Balfour
