= Laurence Sinclair =

Sir Laurence Sinclair
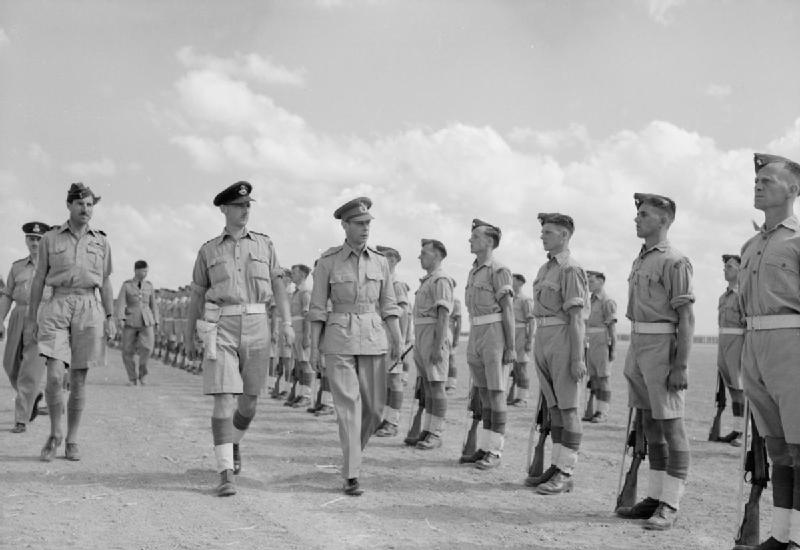
- Air Commondore Sinclair escorts King George VI while inspecting an RAF Regiment guard of honour, at Hammamet, Tunisia, 1943.
- Born: 13 June 1908; Frinton-on-Sea, Essex, England
- Died: 14 May 2002 (aged 93); Oxfordshire, England
- Military career
- Allegiance: United Kingdom
- Branch: Royal Air Force
- Service years: 1926–1960
- Rank: Air Vice Marshal
- Commands: Joint Services Staff College (1958–60); British Forces Aden (1955–57); School of Land/Air Warfare (1952–53); Royal Air Force College Cranwell (1950–52); No. 2 Group (1948–49); RAF Gutersloh (1947–48); Tactical Bomber Force (1943); No. 323 Wing (1942–43); No. 110 Squadron (1940–41)
- Conflicts: Second World War
- Awards: George Cross; Knight Commander of the Order of the Bath; Commander of the Order of the British Empire; Distinguished Service Order & Bar; Mentioned in Despatches (2); Officer of the Legion of Merit (United States)

Air Vice Marshal Sir Laurence Frank Sinclair, GC, KCB, CBE, DSO & Bar (13 June 1908 – 14 May 2002) was a Royal Air Force officer who was awarded the George Cross for rescuing a severely injured airman from a crashed and burning plane.

== RAF career ==
Sinclair joined the Royal Air Force as a cadet at the RAF College in 1926. He served in the Second World War and was appointed officer commanding No. 110 Squadron in 1940. The event that led to him being awarded the George Cross took place on 30 September 1941 at RAF Wattisham in Suffolk. The co-pilot, Sergeant S. Walters, later died of his injuries. The pilot, Sergeant John Edwin Merrett, died instantly upon impact. The only other crew member to survive was the navigator, Flight Sergeant Anthony George Byron. Sinclair continued his war service as senior air staff officer at No. 6 Group and then at No. 91 Group. He became officer commanding No. 323 Wing in 1943 and then became air officer commanding the Tactical Bomber Force and then senior air staff officer for the Balkan Air Force.

After the war he became director of postings (selection) at the Air Ministry and then attended the Imperial Defence College before being appointed senior air staff officer No. 84 Group in 1947. He was made station commander at RAF Gutersloh later that year, air officer commanding No. 2 Group in 1948 and assistant commandant at RAF Cranwell in 1949. He went on to be commandant of the School of Land / Air Warfare in 1952, assistant chief of the air staff (operations) in 1953 and air officer commanding British Forces Aden in 1955. His last appointment was as commandant of the Joint Services Staff College in 1958 before retiring in 1960.

In retirement he became the first controller (chief executive) of the UK's National Air Traffic Control Services (NATCS). His medal is on display at the Victoria & George Cross Gallery in London's Imperial War Museum.

Military offices
Recreated Title last held by Anthony Paxton in 1947	Air Officer Commanding No. 2 Group; 1948–1950	Succeeded by The Earl of Bandon
Preceded by George Beamish	Commandant Royal Air Force College Cranwell; 1950–1952	Succeeded by Henry Eeles
Preceded by Sidney Bufton	Air Officer Commanding British Forces Aden; 1955–1957	Succeeded by Maurice Heath
