= Sidney Osborne Bufton =

British Air Force commander

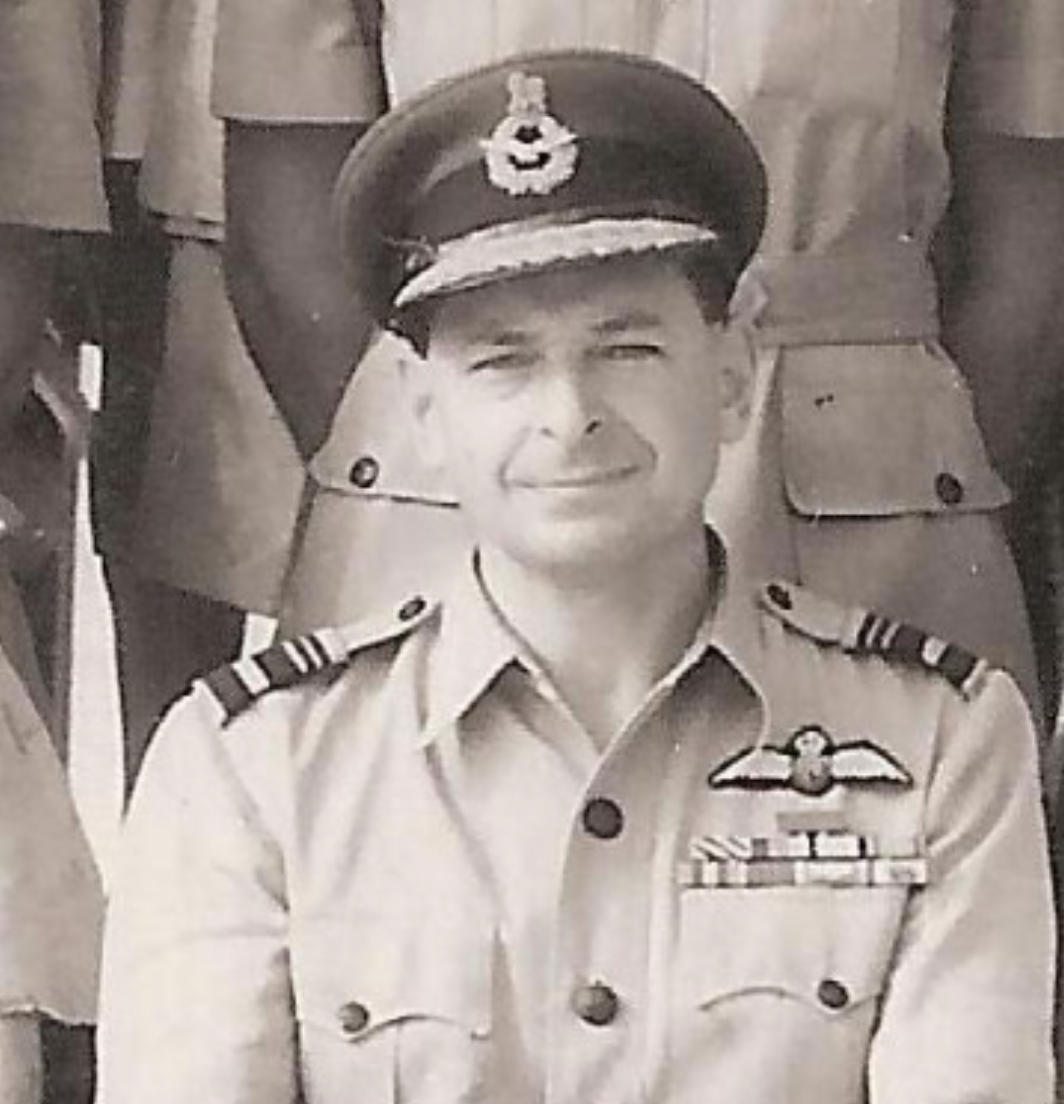
- Air Vice Marshall Sidney Osborne Bufton CB DFC
- Born: 12 January 1908; Wales
- Died: 29 March 1993 (aged 85); Surrey, England
- Military career
- Allegiance: United Kingdom
- Branch: Royal Air Force
- Service years: 1927–61
- Rank: Air Vice Marshal
- Commands: British Forces Aden (1953–55); Central Bomber Establishment (1947–48); Bomber Command; RAF Pocklington (1941); No. 76 Squadron (1941); No. 10 Squadron (1940–41)
- Conflicts: Second World War
- Awards: Companion of the Order of the Bath; Distinguished Flying Cross; Commander of the Legion of Merit (United States); Commander of the Order of Orange-Nassau (Netherlands)
- Other work: High Sheriff of Radnorshire; Managing Director of Radionic Ltd

Air Vice Marshal Sidney Osborne Bufton, CB, DFC (12 January 1908 – 29 March 1993) was a senior commander in the Royal Air Force during the middle part of the 20th century. He played a major part in establishing the Pathfinder project, over the objections of Arthur Harris.

== Early life ==
Bufton attended Dean Close School, Cheltenham.

== RAF career ==
Bufton joined the Royal Air Force in 1927. As a young man he was a Welsh International Hockey player (1931–1937) as well as playing for the RAF and the Combined Services. He served in World War II as Officer Commanding No. 10 Squadron and then as Officer Commanding No. 76 Squadron before becoming Station Commander at RAF Pocklington in 1941. He continued his war service as deputy director and then as Director of Bomber Operations. He argued for the formation of a Target Finding Force to improve the accuracy and effectiveness of Bomber Command. In this he was opposed by the group and squadron commanders, and Bomber Command's commanding officer, Arthur Harris. He was supported by the Air Ministry and Charles Portal. The force became the Pathfinder Force, which was critical in making the air campaign over Germany a success. He headed the preparations for the ill-fated Operation Thunderclap and for the air warfare against cities and civilians in German-occupied Europe.

After the War he was appointed Commandant of the Central Bomber Establishment and then Deputy Chief of Staff (Operations and Plans) at Headquarters Air Forces Western Europe in 1948. He was made Director of Weapons at the Air Ministry in 1951, Air Officer Administration at Headquarters Bomber Command in 1952 and Air Officer Commanding at British Forces Aden in 1953. His last appointments were as Senior Air Staff Officer at Headquarters Bomber Command in 1955 and as Assistant Chief of Staff (Intelligence) at the Air Ministry in 1958 before retiring in 1961.

After retiring from the RAF, he joined Radionic Ltd. as an inventor and later became managing director until 1970.

Military offices
Preceded by Douglas Macfadyen	Air Officer Commanding British Forces Aden; 1953–1955	Succeeded by Laurence Frank Sinclair
Preceded by William MacDonald	Assistant Chief of the Air Staff (Intelligence); 1958–1961	Succeeded by Alick Foord-Kelcey
