= Ranald Reid =

Sir Ranald Reid
- Born: 25 October 1893; Ardeer, Scotland
- Died: 19 May 1991 (aged 97)
- Military career
- Allegiance: United Kingdom
- Branch: British Army (1914–1918); Royal Air Force (1918–1946)
- Service years: 1914–1946
- Rank: Air Vice Marshal
- Commands: West Africa (1944–1946); No. 54 Group (1943–1944); British Forces Aden (1938–1941); RAF Halton (1936–1938); RAF Upper Heyford (1935–1936); RAF Spitalgate (1925–1927); No. 99 Squadron (1924–1925); No. 47 Squadron (1920); No. 206 Squadron (1919); No. 211 Squadron (1918–1919); No. 1 Flying Training School (1917–1918); No. 18 Squadron (1917)
- Conflicts: First World War; Second World War
- Awards: Knight Commander of the Order of the Bath; Distinguished Service Order; Military Cross & Bar; Mentioned in Despatches

Air Vice Marshal Sir George Ranald MacFarlane Reid, KCB, DSO, MC & Bar (25 October 1893 – 19 May 1991), known as Sir Ranald Reid, was a Scottish senior officer of the Royal Air Force. He began his career in aviation in the First World War with the Royal Flying Corps after transferring from the Black Watch. He rose through a series of command positions in the RAF to become a consequential participant in the Second World War.

== Early life ==
George Ranald MacFarlane Reid was born in Ardeer, Scotland on 25 October 1893.

== Military career ==
=== First World War ===
Reid began his military career in the Officer Training Corps prior to the First World War. He was commissioned a temporary second lieutenant in the Argyll and Sutherland Highlanders on 15 August 1914, in the early days of the war. However, it was with the Black Watch that he went into action; in January 1915, he was wounded at the Battle of Festubert while with the Watch. The wound could not have been serious, as Reid began pilot's training that same month. The following month, on 16 February, he was confirmed as a Second Lieutenant. He earned Aviators' Certificate No. 1900, awarded on 16 October 1915. Upon completion of training, he was assigned to No. 25 Squadron RFC; his appointment as a flying officer dated from 15 November 1915. Reid destroyed enemy aircraft on 16, 19, and 21 May 1916, using a Royal Aircraft Factory FE.2b with Lieutenant James Anderson Mann as his pilot. Reid won a Military Cross (MC) on 24 June 1916 as a result of these victories.

On 19 June, Reid had been transferred to No. 20 Squadron RFC as a Flight Commander with the accompanying rank of acting captain. With 20 Squadron, Reid used a slightly newer FE.2d with Lieutenant Laurence H. Scott as his gunner; the pair scored six more wins between 29 July and 21 October 1916. Reid's final tally was seven German planes destroyed, two driven down out of control. A Bar in lieu of a second MC followed, on 25 November 1916.

On 10 February 1917, Reid was promoted to temporary major, a squadron command rank in wartime. On 30 March 1917, he was promoted to command of No. 18 Squadron RFC on the Western Front. On 25 July 1918, he was transferred to command of No. 211 Squadron RAF.

=== Interwar period ===
On 23 May 1919, Reid took command of No. 206 Squadron RAF. Over the next year and a half, the squadron would move from the Western Front to Germany and on to Egypt, renumbering as No. 47 Squadron RAF along the way. He received the rank of squadron leader to match his position, on 1 August 1919. When this assignment ended on 30 December 1920, he moved on to three years of staff duty. On 23 April 1924, he took command of No. 99 Squadron RAF.

On 1 July 1925, he was again promoted, to wing commander. In the wake of this promotion, on 15 September 1925, he was transferred to command of RAF Spitalgate. This ended on 8 September 1927, when he was posted to Khartoum as Senior RAF Officer.

He returned home from this posting on 20 January 1930. Over the next three years, he would attend both the RAF Staff College and the Imperial Defence College, with a staff assignment wedged between. On 1 July 1932, he was promoted to group captain. On 25 March 1933, he began duty as air attaché to the United States, in Washington, D.C. In 1934, was engaged to his future wife, Miss Leslie Livermore Wright, granddaughter of former United States Senator William D. Washburn of Minnesota.

Upon his return to England, on 3 October 1935, he took command of RAF Upper Heyford. He was raised to air commodore on 1 July 1936.

=== Second World War ===
After a spell as Commandant of a technical school, Reid was chosen as Air Officer Commanding British Forces Aden. On 1 April 1939, he reached air vice marshal. While in this post, he had to project air operations 200 miles out to support British defense efforts in Somaliland; lack of usable airfields kept him from stationing airplanes closer to the effort. Nevertheless, Reid's conduct of these air operations garnered him a Mention in Despatches in both the 12 September 1941 report of General Sir Archibald Wavell to the Secretary of State for War, and of Wavell's followup to it on 21 May 1942. Reid's return to England saw him posted as Air Officer Administration at Headquarters Flying Training Command on 18 July 1941. From there, he moved to becoming Air Officer Commanding No. 54 Group on 21 June 1943. On 14 December 1944, he became Air Officer Commanding West Africa.

== Later life ==
Reid retired on 20 January 1946, having faithfully served his country for 32 years and through two world wars. On 1 January 1952, he was honoured with the appointment of Gentleman Usher to King George VI. He continued in that post for Queen Elizabeth II; she renewed his appointment 1 August 1952. On 10 November 1959, Reid resigned as Gentleman Usher, but was concurrently appointed an Extra Gentleman Usher.

Military offices
Preceded by Wilfred McClaughry	Air Officer Commanding British Forces Aden; 1938–1941	Succeeded by Frederick Hards
