= John Martin (Royal Navy officer) =

Royal Navy Vice-Admiral (1918–2011)

Vice-Admiral Sir John Martin KCB DSC
- Born: 10 May 1918; Cheam, Surrey
- Died: 31 May 2011 (aged 93)
- Military career
- Allegiance: United Kingdom
- Branch: Royal Navy
- Service years: 1938–1973
- Rank: Vice-Admiral
- Commands: British Forces Gulf (1967–68); Britannia Royal Naval College (1963–66)
- Conflicts: Second World War; Aden Emergency
- Awards: Knight Commander of the Order of the Bath; Distinguished Service Cross; Mentioned in Despatches

Vice-Admiral Sir John Edward Ludgate Martin, KCB, DSC (10 May 1918 – 31 May 2011) was a Royal Navy officer and Lieutenant Governor of Guernsey.

== Naval career ==
Martin joined the Royal Navy in 1938. He served in the Second World War, taking part in the Dunkirk evacuation when his ship, Sun Tug 15, undertook four trips to Dunkirk to pick up evacuees. He also served as a navigation officer in the Mediterranean and took part in the invasion of Sicily in 1943.

Martin was appointed deputy director of Manpower Planning at the Admiralty in 1959, Senior Naval Officer in the West Indies in 1961 and Commander of British Forces in the Caribbean Area in 1962. He went on to be Captain at the Royal Naval College, Dartmouth in 1963, Flag Officer, Middle East in 1966 and Commander of British Forces in the Gulf in 1967. His last appointments were as Director General of Naval Personal Services and Training in 1968 and Deputy Supreme Allied Commander Atlantic in 1970; he retired in 1973.

In retirement he became Lieutenant Governor of Guernsey. He died on 31 May 2011.

== Family ==
In 1942 Martin married Rosemary Ann Deck; they had two sons and two daughters.

Military offices
Preceded by Sir Peter Compston	Deputy Supreme Allied Commander Atlantic; 1970–1973	Succeeded by Sir Gerard Mansfield
Preceded by Peter N. Howes	Flag Officer, Middle East; 1966–1967	Succeeded by None
Government offices
Preceded by Sir Charles Mills	Lieutenant Governor of Guernsey; 1974–1980	Succeeded by Sir Peter Le Cheminant
