= No. 904 Expeditionary Air Wing =

No.904 Expeditionary Air Wing
- Wing badge
- Active: 1 October 1944 – 30 November 1946 1 April 2006 – December 2009
- Disbanded: December 2009
- Country: United Kingdom
- Branch: Royal Air Force
- Role: Expeditionary operations
- Part of: Part of No. 83 Expeditionary Air Group
- Home station: Kandahar Airfield, Afghanistan
- Mottos: Ex aere auxilium (Latin for 'Help from the air')

No. 904 Expeditionary Air Wing was a wing of the Royal Air Force. It was stationed at Kandahar Airfield in Afghanistan controlling RAF operations at the air base there. It was activated on 1 April 2006 as part of a modernisation package to make the RAF more deployable on an expeditionary basis. It used to report to No. 83 Expeditionary Air Group.

== History ==
In the Second World War, the wing existed for a brief period as 904 Tactical Wing. It was first formed on 1 October 1944 as a tactical wing and its four squadrons were equipped with Republic P-47 Thunderbolts and operated in tactical support of the Fourteenth Army in the liberation of Burma. In early 1945, the wing was withdrawn from Burma to prepare for supporting the invasion of Malaya scheduled for later in the year; however, the end of the war intervened and the wing was re-roled. It was deployed to Java in the Netherlands East Indies in the aftermath of the war, commanded by David Lee. Two of its Thunderbolt squadrons were replaced by a Douglas Dakota squadron and aircraft of the wing took part in the repatriation of Allied prisoners of the war and internees. Following completion of that task the wing was disbanded on 30 November 1946.

The wing was based at Kandahar Airfield and had a:

- British Aerospace 146 detachment.
- General Atomics MQ-9 Reaper detachment.
- Lockheed Martin C-130J Super Hercules detachment.
- Panavia Tornado GR4 detachment.
