= Maurice Heath =

Sir Maurice Heath
- Born: 12 August 1909
- Died: 9 July 1998 (aged 88)
- Military career
- Allegiance: United Kingdom
- Branch: Royal Air Force
- Service years: 1927–65
- Rank: Air marshal
- Commands: RAF Staff College, Bracknell (1959–62); British Forces Arabian Peninsula (1957–59); Bomber Command Bombing School (1952–53); Central Gunnery School (1948–49); RAF Metheringham (1944–45)
- Conflicts: World War II
- Awards: Knight Commander of the Order of the British Empire; Companion of the Order of the Bath; Commander of the Royal Victorian Order; Mentioned in dispatches

Air Marshal Sir Maurice Lionel Heath, KBE, CB, CVO, DL (12 August 1909 – 9 July 1998) was a British senior Royal Air Force officer who became Commander of British Forces Arabian Peninsula.

== RAF career ==
Educated at Sutton Valence School in Kent, Heath joined the Royal Air Force as a cadet in 1927. He served in the Second World War on the staff at the Deputy Directorate of Armament Training before becoming Station Commander at RAF Metheringham. He became Officer Commanding the Central Gunnery School in 1948, Officer Commanding the Bomber Command Bombing School in 1952 and Deputy Air Secretary in 1954. He was appointed Commander of British Forces Arabian Peninsula in 1957 before moving on to be Commandant at the RAF Staff College, Bracknell in 1959 and Chief of Staff at Headquarters Allied Air Forces Central Europe in 1962 before retiring in 1965.

In retirement he became a working director of a London firm of estate agents as well as Deputy Lieutenant of West Sussex.

== Family ==
He married Kathleen Mary Gibson in 1938; they had one son and one daughter. Following the death of his first wife he married Lisa Cooke in 1989.

Military offices
Preceded by Laurence Sinclair	Air Officer Commanding British Forces Arabian Peninsula; 1957–1959	Succeeded by Sir Hubert Patch
Preceded by Charles Elworthy	Commandant of the RAF Staff College, Bracknell; 1959–1962	Succeeded by David Lee
