= Flag Officer, Middle East =

The Flag Officer, Middle East was a command appointment of the Royal Navy, established for two distinct periods from 1946–58 and then from c. 1962–1967. From c. 1946–1958 the appointment was located in the Suez Canal Zone or, after the Suez Crisis, in the Cyprus area; when reestablished from the post of Flag Officer, Arabian Seas and Persian Gulf, the focus was on the other side of Arabia. The headquarters moved from HMS Juffair in Bahrain to HMS Sheba, Steamer Point, Aden in 1962, and was located there until the British evacuation from Aden in 1967.

In August 1946 the title Commander-in-Chief, Levant was discontinued. Instead the title Senior British Naval Officer and Flag Officer Liaison, Middle East was adopted. In 1958 the last Commander-in-Chief, East Indies, hauled down his flag. His former units and establishments were transferred to the joint-service Middle East Command at Aden. In 1959 the former East Indies Persian Gulf Division and Red Sea division were amalgamated under the Commodore, Arabian Seas and Persian Gulf. In early 1962, the Flag Officer moved his headquarters from Bahrain to Aden, and by that time, the title Flag Officer Middle East was in use again.

In October 1967, Middle East Command in Aden was abolished, and the remaining naval forces 'East of Suez' were transferred to the Far East Fleet.

== Flag Officer Middle East, 1946 - 58 ==
	Rank	Flag	Name	Term	Notes/Ref
Senior British Naval Officer and Flag Officer Liaison, Middle East
1	Rear-Admiral	Rear-Admiral - Royal Navy	Henry W. U. McCall	11 August 1946 – 9 September 1948	HMS Stag
2	Rear-Admiral	Rear-Admiral - Royal Navy	Albert L. Poland	4 September 1948-March 1950	HMS Stag
3	Rear-Admiral	Rear-Admiral - Royal Navy	Ian M.R. Campbell	March 1950-June 1952	HMS Osiris

	Rank	Flag	Name	Term	Notes/Ref
Flag Officer, Middle East
1	Rear-Admiral	Rear-Admiral - Royal Navy	Graham H. Stokes	June 1952-April 1954	
2	Rear-Admiral	Rear-Admiral - Royal Navy	Patrick W. Brock	April 1954-March 1956	
3	Rear-Admiral	Rear-Admiral - Royal Navy	Anthony C.C. Miers	March 1956 – 1958	

== Bahrain and Aden, 1959-67 ==
=== Flag Officer, Arabian Seas and Persian Gulf ===
Post holders included:

	Rank	Flag	Name	Term	Notes/Ref
Flag Officer, Arabian Seas and Persian Gulf
1	Commodore		G. F. M. Best	October 1959 - August 1960	National Archives holdings include
2	Rear-Admiral	Rear-Admiral - Royal Navy	Fitzroy Talbot	August 1960 - August 1962	Title changed to Flag Officer Middle East by May 1, 1962, the date his HQ moved from Bahrain to Aden.

=== Flag Officer, Middle East ===
Post holders included:

	Rank	Flag	Name	Term	Notes/Ref
Flag Officer, Middle East
1	Rear-Admiral	Rear-Admiral - Royal Navy	John E. Scotland	August 1962-August 1964	
2	Rear-Admiral	Rear-Admiral - Royal Navy	Peter N. Howes	August 1964-September 1966	
3	Rear-Admiral	Rear-Admiral - Royal Navy	John E.L. Martin	September 1966-September 1967	Then became Commander, British Forces Gulf at Juffair from Sept 1967 to August 1968.
