= RAF Heliopolis =

RAF Heliopolis
- Heliopolis, Cairo, Cairo Governorate in Egypt

Site information
- Type: Royal Air Force station
- Operator: Royal Air Force

Location
- Shown within Egypt
- Coordinates: 30°05′01″N 31°18′49″E

Site history
- Built: 1916
- In use: 1916–1944
- Battles/wars: Mediterranean and Middle East theatre of World War II

Airfield information
Runways
Direction	Length and surface
00/00	Grass field

Royal Air Force Heliopolis or more simply RAF Heliopolis is a former Royal Air Force station located to the east of Cairo City centre, Cairo Governorate, Egypt.

During World War I the aerodrome was operated by the British Royal Flying Corps, housing several squadrons as well as a training wing, and then the Royal Air Force, being designated RAF Heliopolis in April 1918. In the inter-war period it remained an active RAF base, housing several squadrons, including No. 208 Squadron RAF which was based there almost continuously from 1927 until 1942.

At the end of a training regime from January to mid-March 1942 (involving the handling of Italian and German weapons, sabotage and parachutism), the French SAS company executed a surprise mock attack against the aerodrome of Heliopolis without the knowledge of the garrison and its commander.

== History ==
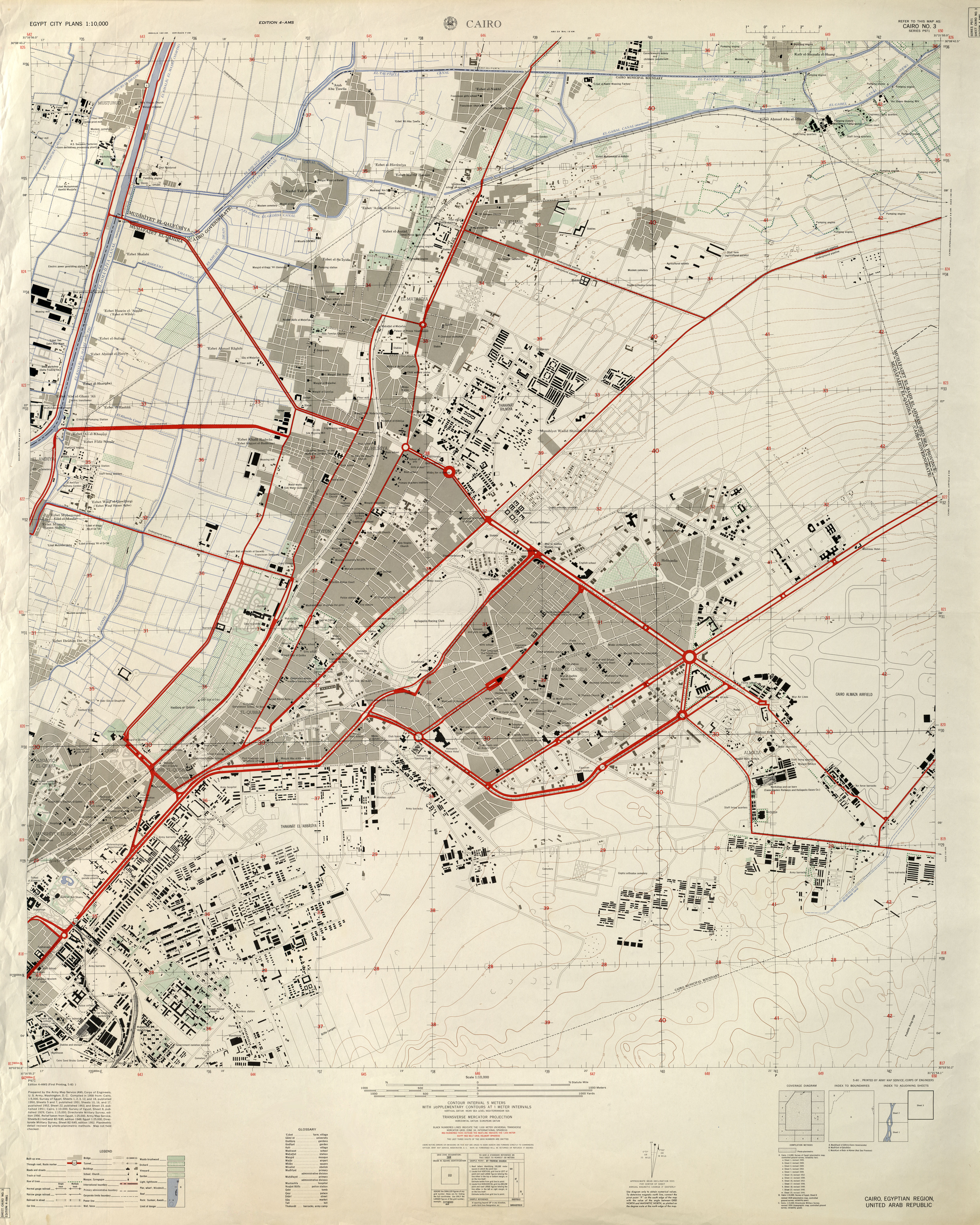
1958 Map of Cairo showing RAF Heliopolis in the middle at the bottom, open ground to the south of the Heliopolis Shooting Club

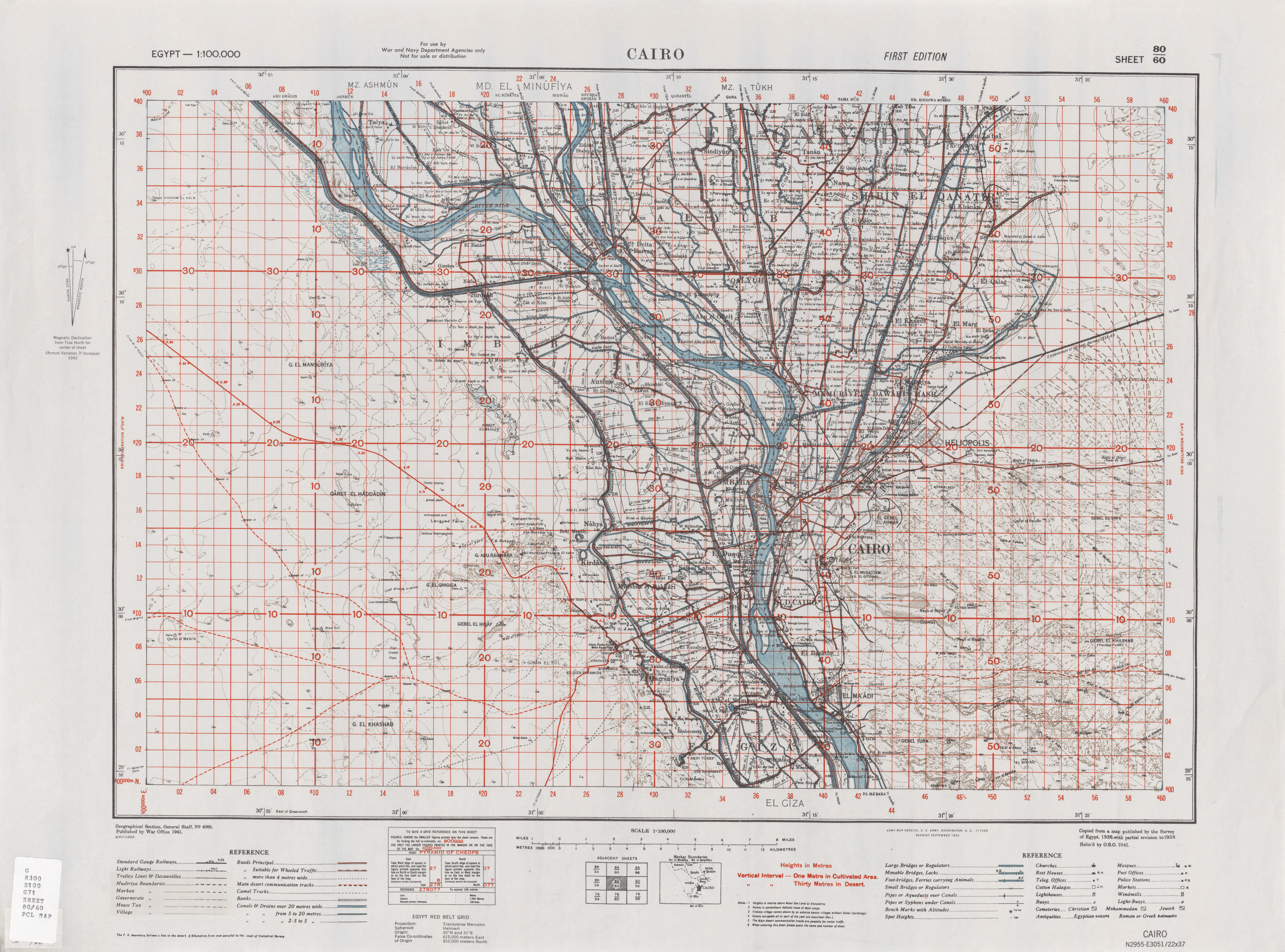
1941 Cairo Map showing RAF Heliopolis on the right, open ground to the south of the racecourse

The following RAF squadrons were also here at some point:

- Detachment from No. 6 Squadron RAF between February and April 1941 with the Hawker Hurricane I
- Detachment from No. 11 Squadron RAF between May and June 1940 with the Bristol Blenheim I
- No. 14 Squadron RAF between 12 April and 1 May 1941 with the Blenheim IV
- No. 17 Squadron RAF between 18 December 1915 and 2 July 1916 with the Royal Aircraft Factory B.E.2C
- No. 30 Squadron RAF between 19 and 25 February 1942 with the Hurricane I
- No. 33 Squadron RAF between 29 September and 3 October 1938 with the Gloster Gladiator I
- No. 39 Squadron RAF between 7 and 13 May 1940 with Blenheim I
- No. 40 Squadron RAF between 13 and 20 January 1943 with the Vickers Wellington IC
- No. 45 Squadron RAF between 25 April and 21 October 1927 with the Airco DH.9A
- No. 55 Squadron RAF between 15 February and 10 March 1941 with the Blenheim IV
- No. 58 Squadron RAF between 2 May 1919 and 1 February 1920 with the Handley Page Type O/400 and the Vickers Vimy
- No. 64 Squadron RAF between 1 March and 9 April 1936 with the Hawker Demon
- No. 67 Squadron RAF between 12 September and 17 December 1916 with the B.E.2C and the Avro 504K
- No. 70 Squadron RAF between 1 February 1920 and 16 January 1922 with the HP 0/400
- No. 73 Squadron RAF between 30 November and 30 December 1940 with the Hurricane I
- Detachment from No. 80 Squadron RAF between November 1943 and January 1944 with the Spitfire IX
- No. 84 Squadron RAF between 24 September and 16 November 1940 with the Blenheim I
- No. 92 (East India) Squadron RAF between 30 April and 4 August 1942 without any aircraft
- No. 113 Squadron RAF between 11 May and 29 September 1938 with the Hawker Hind
- No. 173 Squadron RAF between 9 July 1942 and 29 February 1944 with multiple aircraft
- No. 206 Squadron RAF between 19 and 27 June 1919 with the DH.9
- No. 208 Squadron RAF between 27 October 1927 and 24 January 1936 with the Hawker Audax
- No. 211 Squadron RAF between 23 and 27 April 1941 with Blenheim I
- No. 216 Squadron RAF between 15 April 1921 and 7 October 1941 with multiple aircraft
- No. 267 Squadron RAF between 20 August 1940 and 18 August 1942 with multiple aircraft
- Detachment from No. 272 Squadron RAF between March and November 1942 with the Bristol Beaufighter IC
- Detachment from No. 417 Squadron RCAF between October 1942 and January 1943 with the Spitfire VC
- No. 451 Squadron RAAF between 27 January and 16 February 1942 with Hurricane I

== Current use ==
After the Second World War, the site was turned into an army barracks then, turned into the Egyptian Air Force Headquarters.

== See also ==
- List of former Royal Air Force stations
- List of North African airfields during World War II
