= Frank McNamara (RAAF officer) =

Australian Victoria Cross recipient

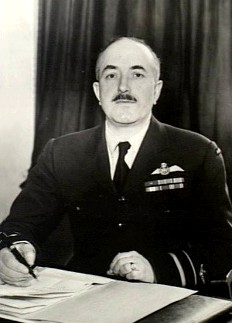
- Air Vice Marshal Frank McNamara VC, England, 1942
- Born: 4 April 1894; Rushworth, Victoria, Australia
- Died: 2 November 1961 (aged 67); Buckinghamshire, England
- Military career
- Allegiance: Australia
- Branch: Royal Australian Air Force
- Service years: 1913–46
- Rank: Air Vice Marshal
- Unit: No. 1 Squadron AFC (1916–17)
- Commands: No. 1 FTS (1930–33); RAAF Station Laverton (1933–36); RAAF Overseas Headquarters (1942); British Forces Aden (1943–45)
- Conflicts: World War I; Middle Eastern theatre; Sinai and Palestine campaign; World War II; European theatre; Middle Eastern theatre
- Awards: Victoria Cross; Companion of the Order of the Bath; Commander of the Order of the British Empire
- Other work: National Coal Board, UK (1947–57)

Air Vice Marshal Francis Hubert (Frank) McNamara, VC, CB, CBE (4 April 1894 – 2 November 1961) was an Australian recipient of the Victoria Cross, the highest decoration for valour in the face of the enemy that can be awarded to a member of the British and Commonwealth forces. Serving with the Australian Flying Corps, he was honoured for his actions on 20 March 1917, when he rescued a fellow pilot who had been forced down behind enemy lines. McNamara was the first Australian aviator—and the only one in World War I—to receive the Victoria Cross. He later became a senior commander in the Royal Australian Air Force (RAAF).

Born and educated in Victoria, McNamara was a teacher when he joined the militia prior to World War I. In 1915, he was selected for pilot training at Central Flying School, Point Cook, and transferred to the Australian Flying Corps the following year. He was based in the Middle Eastern Theatre with No. 1 Squadron when he earned the Victoria Cross. In 1921, McNamara enlisted as a flying officer in the newly formed RAAF, rising to the rank of air vice marshal by 1942. He held senior posts in England and Aden during World War II. Retiring from the Air Force in 1946, McNamara continued to live in Britain until his death from heart failure in 1961.

== Early life ==
Born in Rushworth, Victoria, McNamara was the first of eight children to William Francis McNamara, a State Lands Department officer, and his wife Rosanna. He began his schooling in Rushworth, and completed his secondary education at Shepparton Agricultural High School, which he had entered via a scholarship. The family moved to Melbourne in 1910.

McNamara joined the school cadets in 1911, and was commissioned a second lieutenant in the 49th Battalion (Brighton Rifles), a militia unit, in July 1913. He became a teacher after graduating from Melbourne Teachers' Training College in 1914, and taught at various schools in Victoria. He also enrolled in the University of Melbourne, but his studies were interrupted by the outbreak of World War I.

== World War I ==
=== Militia to Australian Flying Corps ===
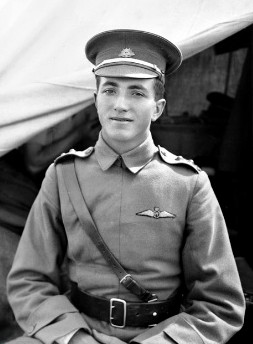
Lieutenant McNamara at Point Cook, Victoria, 1916

As a militia officer, McNamara was mobilised for service in Australia when war was declared in August 1914. After serving briefly at bases in Queenscliff and Point Nepean, Victoria, McNamara passed through Officers Training School at Broadmeadows in December. He began instructing at the Australian Imperial Force Training Depot, Broadmeadows, in February 1915. Promoted to lieutenant in July, he immediately volunteered for a military aeronautics course at Central Flying School, Point Cook.

Selected for flying training at Point Cook in August 1915, McNamara made his first solo flight in a Bristol Boxkite on 18 September, and graduated as a pilot in October. On 6 January 1916, he was assigned as adjutant to No. 1 Squadron, Australian Flying Corps (also known until 1918 as No. 67 Squadron, Royal Flying Corps). In March, McNamara departed Melbourne for Egypt aboard HMAT Orsova, arriving in Suez the following month. He was seconded to No. 42 Squadron RFC in May to attend the Central Flying School at Upavon, England; his secondment to the RFC was gazetted on 5 July 1916.

Completing his course at Upavon, McNamara was posted back to Egypt in August, but was hospitalised on 8 September with orchitis (an inflammation of the testes). Discharged on 6 October, he served briefly as a flying instructor with No. 22 Squadron RFC, before returning to No. 1 Squadron. McNamara flew with C Flight, commanded by Captain (later Air Marshal Sir) Richard Williams. On his first sortie, a reconnaissance mission over Sinai, McNamara was unaware that his plane had been hit by anti-aircraft fire; he returned to base with his engine's oil supply almost exhausted. Flying B.E.2s and Martinsydes, he undertook further scouting and bombing missions in the ensuing months.

=== Victoria Cross ===
On 20 March 1917, McNamara, flying a Martinsyde, was one of four No. 1 Squadron pilots taking part in a raid against a Turkish railway junction near Gaza. Owing to a shortage of bombs, the aircraft were each armed with six specially modified 4.5-inch howitzer shells. McNamara had successfully dropped three of his shells when the fourth exploded prematurely, badly wounded him in the leg with shrapnel, an effect he likened to being "hit with a sledgehammer". Having turned to head back to base, he spotted a fellow squadron member from the same mission, Captain Douglas Rutherford, on the ground beside his crashlanded B.E.2. Allied airmen had been hacked to death by enemy troops in similar situations, and McNamara saw that a company of Turkish cavalry was fast approaching Rutherford's position. Despite the rough terrain and the gash in his leg, McNamara landed near Rutherford to try to rescue him.

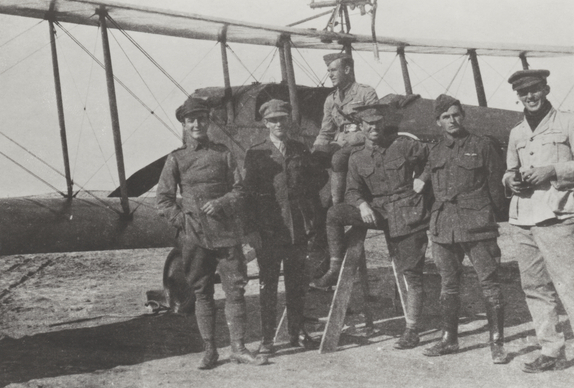
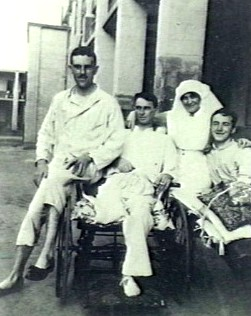
Left: McNamara (far left) with other members of C Flight, No. 1 Squadron AFC, including Captain Williams (third from right), and Lieutenant Wackett (far right), with a Martinsyde near the Suez Canal, Egypt, 1917. Right: McNamara (right) in hospital, Cairo, 1917.

As there was no spare cockpit in the single-seat Martinsyde, the downed pilot jumped onto McNamara's wing and held the struts. McNamara crashed while attempting to take off because of the effects of his leg wound and Rutherford's weight overbalancing the aircraft. The two men, who had escaped further injury in the accident, set fire to the Martinsyde and dashed back to Rutherford's B.E.2. Rutherford repaired the engine while McNamara used his revolver against the attacking cavalry, who had opened fire on them. Two other No. 1 Squadron pilots overhead, Lieutenant (later Air Marshal Sir) Roy "Peter" Drummond and Lieutenant Alfred Ellis, also began strafing the enemy troops. McNamara managed to start the B.E.2's engine and take off, with Rutherford in the observer's cockpit. In severe pain and close to blacking out from loss of blood, McNamara flew the damaged aircraft 70 miles (110 km) back to base at El Arish.

Having effected what was described in the Australian official history of the war as "a brilliant escape in the very nick of time and under hot fire", McNamara "could only emit exhausted expletives" before he lost consciousness shortly after landing. Evacuated to hospital, he almost died following an allergic reaction to a routine tetanus injection. McNamara had to be given artificial respiration and stimulants to keep him alive, but recovered quickly. A contemporary news report declared that he was "soon sitting up, eating chicken and drinking champagne". On 26 March, McNamara was recommended for the Victoria Cross by Brigadier General Geoffrey Salmond, general officer commanding Middle East Brigade, RFC. Drummond, Ellis, and Rutherford all wrote statements on 3–4 April attesting to their comrade's actions, Rutherford declaring that "the risk of Lieut. MacNamara being killed or captured was so great that even had he not been wounded he would have been justified in not attempting my rescue—the fact of his already being wounded makes his action one of outstanding gallantry—his determination and resource and utter disregard of danger throughout the operation was worthy of the highest praise". The first and only VC awarded to an Australian airman in World War I, McNamara's decoration was promulgated in the London Gazette on 8 June 1917:

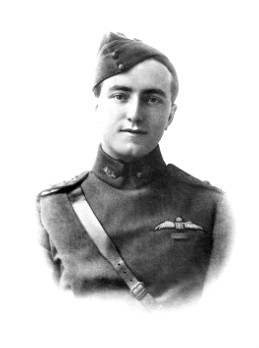
McNamara VC, c. 1917

Lt. Frank Hubert McNamara, Aus. Forces, R.F.C.

For most conspicuous bravery and devotion to duty during an aerial bomb attack upon a hostile construction train, when one of our pilots was forced to land behind the enemy's lines.

Lt. McNamara, observing this pilot's predicament and the fact that hostile cavalry were approaching, descended to his rescue. He did this under heavy rifle fire and in spite of the fact that he himself had been severely wounded in the thigh.

He landed about 200 yards from the damaged machine, the pilot of which climbed onto Lt. McNamara's machine, and an attempt was made to rise. Owing, however, to his disabled leg, Lt. McNamara was unable to keep his machine straight, and it turned over. The two officers, having extricated themselves, immediately set fire to the machine and made their way across to the damaged machine, which they succeeded in starting.

Finally Lt. McNamara, although weak from loss of blood, flew this machine back to the aerodrome, a distance of seventy miles, and thus completed his comrade's rescue.

Promoted to captain on 10 April 1917, McNamara became a flight commander in No. 4 Squadron AFC (also known until 1918 as No. 71 Squadron RFC), but was unable to continue flying due to the leg wound he suffered on 20 March. He was invalided back to Australia in August aboard HT Boorara, and given a hero's welcome on arrival in Melbourne. Found to be medically unfit for active service, McNamara was discharged from the Australian Flying Corps on 31 January 1918. Panic caused by the intrusion into Australian waters of the German raider Wolf resulted in him being recalled to the AFC and put in charge of an aerial reconnaissance unit based in South Gippsland, Victoria, flying a Royal Aircraft Factory F.E.2B and later a Maurice Farman Shorthorn. In September 1918, he was posted as a flying instructor to Point Cook, where he saw out the remainder of the war.

== Between the wars ==
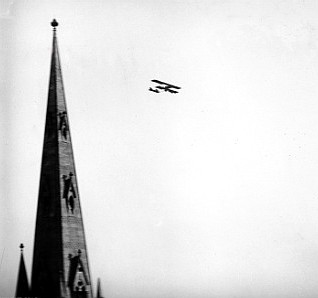
Captain McNamara flying an Avro 504K over St Patrick's Cathedral, Melbourne, c. 1919–20. He was later married in the cathedral.

Following the disbandment of the AFC, McNamara transferred to the Australian Air Corps (AAC) in April 1920. He was not offered an appointment in the AAC initially, and secured one only after Captain Roy King protested the situation by giving up his own place in the new service in favour of McNamara, whom he described as "this very good and gallant officer". McNamara was invested with his Victoria Cross by the Prince of Wales at Government House, Melbourne, on 26 May. He enlisted in the newly established Royal Australian Air Force (RAAF) in 1921. Ranked flying officer (honorary flight lieutenant), he was one of the original twenty-one officers on the Air Force's strength at its formation that March. Posted to RAAF Headquarters in Melbourne as Staff Officer Operations and Intelligence, McNamara was given command of No. 1 Flying Training School (No. 1 FTS) at Point Cook in July 1922. He was promoted squadron leader in March 1924 and the following month married Hélène Bluntschli, a Belgian national he had met in Cairo during the war, at St Patrick's Cathedral; his best man was fellow officer Frank Lukis.

McNamara travelled to England in 1925 for two years exchange with the Royal Air Force, serving at No. 5 Flying Training School, RAF Sealand, and the Directorate of Training at the Air Ministry, London. Returning to Australia in November 1927, he was appointed Second-in-Command No. 1 FTS. In 1928, McNamara resumed his studies at the University of Melbourne, having earlier failed to pass the necessary exams to enter the RAF Staff College, Andover. A part-time student at the university, he graduated with a Bachelor of Arts in international relations (second-class honours) in 1933. McNamara became commanding officer No. 1 FTS in October 1930, and was promoted to wing commander one year later. He was placed in charge of RAAF Station Laverton, Victoria, including No. 1 Aircraft Depot, in February 1933. McNamara was raised to group captain in 1936, and attended the Imperial Defence College, London, the following year. He was appointed a Commander of the Order of the British Empire (CBE) in the 1938 New Year Honours.

== World War II ==
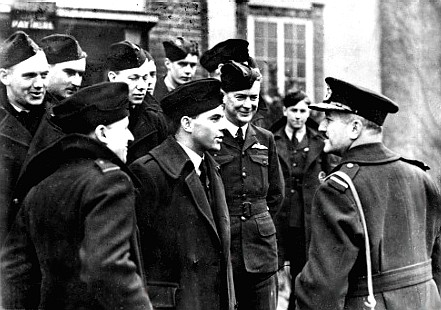
Air Vice Marshal McNamara (right) greets Australian airmen upon their arrival in Britain, 1941

When World War II broke out in September 1939, McNamara was serving as Air Liaison Officer at Australia House in London, a position he had held since January 1938. Shortly before being promoted air commodore in December, he advocated establishing a reception base to act as a headquarters for the RAAF in England and "generally to watch the interests of Australian personnel" who were stationed there. By November 1940 he had reversed his position, in favour of an Air Ministry proposal to process personnel of all nationalities in one RAF base camp. In the event, RAAF Overseas Headquarters was formed on 1 December 1941; Air Marshal Richard Williams was appointed Air Officer Commanding (AOC) and McNamara Deputy AOC. McNamara became acting air vice marshal and acting AOC of RAAF Overseas Headquarters when Williams returned to Australia in January 1942 for what was expected to be a temporary visit; Williams was subsequently posted to Washington, D.C. and McNamara retained command of the headquarters until the end of the year.

McNamara was appointed AOC British Forces Aden in late 1942, and arrived to take up the posting on 9 January 1943. Described in the official history of Australia in the war as a "backwater", British Forces Aden's main functions were conducting anti-submarine patrols and escorting convoys. McNamara flew on these missions whenever he could, generally as an observer, but enemy contact was rare. He was appointed a Companion of the Order of the Bath (CB) in the 1945 New Year Honours, and returned to London in March. That month McNamara was deeply affected by the loss of his close friend Peter Drummond, who had helped keep attacking cavalry at bay during his Victoria Cross action in 1917. Drummond's Consolidated B-24 Liberator disappeared near the Azores en route to Canada and all aboard were presumed killed; McNamara had to break the news to his widow, Isabel. McNamara's health had also suffered from exposure to the desert dust in Aden, and he was unable to take up his next position as the RAAF's representative at the Ministry of Defence until September. His entire war was spent outside Australia.

== Retirement and legacy ==
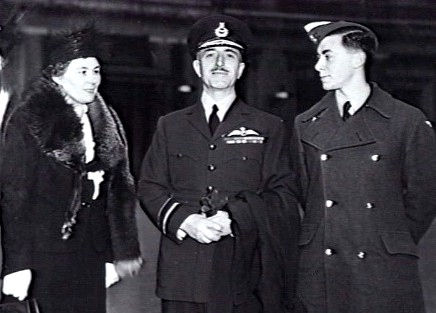
McNamara at Buckingham Palace, London, for his investiture as a Companion of the Bath, flanked by his wife and son, in May 1945

McNamara was summarily retired from the RAAF in 1946, along with several other senior commanders and veterans of World War I, officially to make way for the advancement of younger and equally capable officers. His role overseas had in any case become redundant. He was discharged from the Air Force on 11 July. In May 1946, the British government offered McNamara the position of Senior Education Control Officer in Westphalia, Germany, under the auspices of the Allied Control Commission. He later became Deputy Director of Education for the British Zone of Occupation. McNamara continued to live in England after completing his work with the Commission in October 1947, and served on the National Coal Board in London from 1947 to 1959. He died of hypertensive heart failure on 2 November 1961, aged 67, after suffering a fall at his home in Buckinghamshire. Survived by his wife and two children, he was buried at St Joseph's Priory, Austin Wood, Gerrards Cross, after a large funeral.

Embittered by his dismissal from the RAAF and the meagre severance he received from the Australian Government, McNamara insisted that his Victoria Cross not be returned to Australia after his death; his family donated it to the RAF Museum, London. A fellow No. 1 Squadron pilot, Lieutenant (later Air Vice Marshal) Adrian Cole, described McNamara as "quiet, scholarly, loyal and beloved by all ... the last Officer for whom that high honour would have been predicted". He was one of the few VC recipients to attain senior rank in the armed services, though RAAF historian Alan Stephens considered his appointments largely "routine" and that his one great deed led to "a degree of fame that he perhaps found burdensome". Biographer Chris Coulthard-Clark summed up McNamara's "dilemma" as that of "an essentially ordinary man" thrust into the limelight by one "truly amazing episode". His name is borne by Frank McNamara Park in Shepparton, Victoria, and the Frank McNamara VC Club at Oakey Army Aviation Centre, Queensland.

== Notes ==
Military offices
Preceded by William Bostock	Commanding Officer No. 1 Flying Training School; 1930–33	Succeeded by Hippolyte De La Rue
Preceded by Adrian Cole	Commanding Officer RAAF Station Laverton; 1933–36	Succeeded by Henry Wrigley
Preceded by Richard Williams	Air Officer Commanding RAAF Overseas Headquarters; 1942	Succeeded by Henry Wrigley
Preceded by Frederick Hards	Air Officer Commanding British Forces Aden; 1943–45	Succeeded by Harold Lydford
