= Senior Naval Officer, Persian Gulf =

Persian Gulf Station
- Active: 1818-1972
- Country: United Kingdom
- Branch: Royal Navy
- Type: Naval station
- Part of: East Indies Station (1818-1942); Eastern Fleet (1942–1944); East Indies Fleet (1944-1945); East Indies Station (1949-1958); Middle East Command (1962-1972)
- Garrison/HQ: Basidu; Qishm Island; Persia (c.1823-1850-1911); Henjam Island; Persia (1911-1935); HMS Jufair; Ras Al-Jufair; Bahrain (1935-1972)

The Senior Naval Officer, Persian Gulf, was a Royal Navy command appointment who was responsible for administering the Persian Gulf Station military formation including its establishments and naval forces known as the Persian Gulf Squadron later called the Persian Gulf Division. Initially located at Basidu, Qishm Island, in Persia (c. 1823–1850–1935), then Henjam Island in Persia (1911–1935), and finally Ras Al-Jufair, Bahrain (1935–1972).

The Persian Gulf Station encompassed the Persian Gulf and Straits of Hormuz.

== History ==
British naval presence in the Persian Gulf began in the early nineteenth century with temporary naval forces assembled for specific operations until the establishment of a more constant naval force presence called the Persian Gulf Squadron later the Persian Gulf Division. The Senior Naval Office Persian Gulf gradually became an important position throughout the twentieth century by supporting Britain's strategic interests in the region, he reported to the Commander-in-Chief, East Indies Station. The Persian Gulf was one of the areas of naval operations during First World War in which it assumed a level of importance during the Mesopotamian campaign, its operations consisted of patrolling, keeping the peace and ensuring the continued supply of oil from the region. In May 1942 it then became part of the Eastern Fleet command until May 1944 when it became part of the East Indies Fleet command until July 1945 when it was abolished. The station was re-established in April 1949 reporting to the C-in-C, East Indies Station until 1958. In 1959 the station was merged with the Red Sea Station under the new appointment of Commodore, Arabian Seas and Persian Gulf. In 1962 the station was re-established under the Flag Officer, Middle East, until it was abolished in 1972.

In 2003 the Royal Navy reestablished a post in the Persian Gulf, with a new title, the UK Maritime Component Command. On 1 November 2015, it was announced that HMS Jufair would be re-established as a permanent Royal Navy base. On 5 April 2018, the UK Naval Support Facility was officially opened.

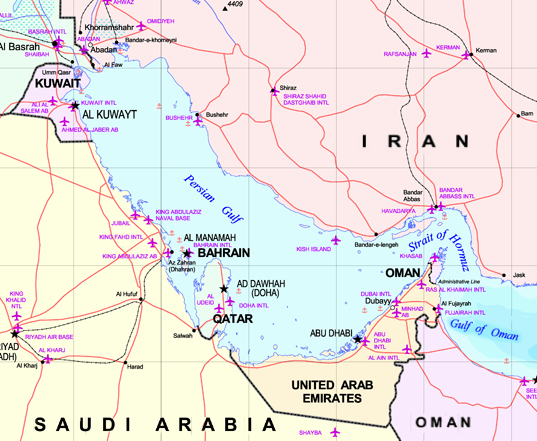
Map of the Persian Gulf and location of the Straits of Hormuz

== Headquarters ==
The British established a Persian Gulf Squadron in the mid-nineteenth century to support the Political Resident Persian Gulf (PRPG), who was responsible for all of Britains relationships in the region. The SNOPG was originally headquartered at Basidu on-board his ship from 1823 onward. A permanent depot and headquarters was first established at Basidu, Qishm Island, in Persia, around 1850. In 1911 his headquarters moved to Henjam Island in the Straits of Hormuz until 12 April 1935. On 13 April 1935 a naval base and shore establishment called HMS Juffair was established at Ras Al-Jufair, Bahrain, which served as headquarters for the SNO Persian Gulf until 1972.

=== SNOPG, Ships ===
From 1885 to 1946 the SNO Persian Gulf was usually aboard an operational ship beginning with HMS Osprey, (1885–1890). Followed by HMS Triad from 1909 to 21 April 1933 and by HMS Shoreham (L32) from 21 April 1933 to 1946.

Four Loch-class frigates were stationed in the Persian Gulf circa 1957: HMS Loch Fada, HMS Loch Fyne, HMS Loch Killisport and HMS Loch Ruthven.

== Senior Naval Officers, Persian Gulf ==
Incomplete list of post holders included:

	Rank	Insig/Flag	Name	Term	Notes/Ref
Senior Naval Officer, Persian Gulf
1	Captain		Francis Erskine Loch	16 October 1818 - September 1837	SNO Persian Gulf
2	Commodore		George Pepper	October -1837 - 1 April 1838	(SNO Persian Gulf)
3	Commander		John Croft Hawkins	1 April - 12 June 1838	SNO Persian Gulf
4	Commodore		Captain Brucks	12 June 1838-?	Acting-SO Persian Gulf
5	Commodore		George Robinson	June 1852	(as Commander, Persian Gulf Squadron)
6	Commander		C. M. Cruttenden	1855 - 12 January 1861	SNO Persian Gulf
7	Commander		H.W. Dowding	October, 1885	SNO Persian Gulf Division
8	Captain		J. H. Pelly	14 August 1895 - May 1896	SNO Persian Gulf
9	Captain		Thomas W. Kemp	1901 – 25 November 1904	Commander and SNO Persian Gulf
10	Commodore		Drury St. A. Wake	18 October 1915 – November, 1918	(as Commodore, Persian Gulf)
11	Commodore		David T. Norris	December 1918-February 1920	(as Commodore, Persian Gulf)
12	Captain		George Parker Bevan	November, 1919 – 14 January 1920	
13	Captain		John L. Pearson	6 February 1920 – February, 1922	later V.Adm
14	Captain		Alexander R. Palmer	February 1922-March 1924	later V.Adm
15	Captain		Ernest W. Leir	March 1924-February 1926	later R.Adm
16	Captain		Reginald St. P. Parry	February 1926-January 1928	
17	Captain		Hector Boyes	January 1928-May 1930	
18	Captain		Lewis G. E. Crabbe	May 1930-March 1933	later V.Adm
19	Captain		James V. Creagh	March 1933-March 1935	later R.Adm
20	Captain		Vernon S. Butler	March 1935-March 1937	later R.Adm.
21	Captain		George H. Faulkner	20 February 1937 – 17 April 1938	
22	Commodore		Allan Poland	March 1937-April 1939	as Captain then later Cmdre.
23	Commodore		Cosmo M. Graham	April 1939-February 1942	
From May 1942 the station is reporting to the C-in-C, Eastern, Fleet until May 1944
24	Rear-Admiral	Rear-Admiral - Royal Navy	Charles Hamill	2 February 1942-January 1944	
From May 1944 the station is reporting to the C-in-C, East Indies, Fleet until July 1945 when its abolished
25	Commodore		John M. Howson	January–September 1944	
26	Commodore		Ivan W. Whitehorn	September 1944 - July, 1945	
The station is re-established in April 1949 reporting to the C-in-C, East Indies Station until 1959
27	Captain		Peter Skelton	April 1949-August 1950	
28	Captain		Arthur H. Wallis	August 1950-April 1952	
29	Captain		Hugh G. Waters	April 1952-October 1953	
30	Captain		Alan S. Webb	October 1953-October 1954	
31	Captain		Vere A. Wight-Boycott	October 1954-April 1956	
32	Captain		Stephen H. Beattie	17 April 1956-April 1958	
33	Captain		George F.M. Best	April 1958 – 1959	Promoted to Cmdre. as Flag Officer, Arabian Seas and Persian Gulf
In 1959 this appointment was merged with that of the Red Sea to form the Arabian Seas and Persian Gulf Station. In 1962 the station re-established under the Flag Officer, Middle East until it was abolished in 1972.
34	Rear-Admiral	Rear-Admiral - Royal Navy	Fitzroy Talbot	August 1960 - August 1962	Title changed to Flag Officer Middle East by May 1, 1962, the date his HQ moved from Bahrain to Aden.
35	Commodore		Michael D. Kyrle-Pope	April 1962-April 1964	reporting to the Flag Officer, Middle East.
36	Commodore		Edmund S. Carver	April 1964-October 1966	reporting to the FOME.
37	Commodore		Thomas E. Fanshawe	October 1966-December 1968	reporting to the FOME.
38	Commodore		Kenneth Lee-White, MBE	December 1968-September 1970	reporting to the FOME
39	Commodore		Sir Peter Anson	September 1970 – 1972	Commander Naval Forces Gulf

== Naval formations and units that served in this command ==
Included:

Naval Units	Based at	Date	Notes
Persian Gulf Division	Manama, Bahrain	1914 - 1958	2 cruisers, 1 minelayer cruiser, 1 scout cruiser 10 destroyers
Persian Gulf Division	Manama, Bahrain	1936 - 1939	Escort sloops – HMS Egret (L75), HMS Fleetwood (U47) (17 Nov 1936)
21st Destroyer Flotilla	Shatt al-Arab, Basra	1939- 1942	
Minesweeping Group 156	Shatt al-Arab, Basra	1942	3 ships
Minesweeping Group 157	Shatt al-Arab, Basra	11942	3 ships
9th Mine-Countermeasures Squadron	Manama, Bahrain	1950-1971	18 ships
Sloops	Basra/	1922 - 1939	13 ships

== Sources ==
- Bankoff, Greg; Christensen, Joseph (2016). Natural Hazards and Peoples in the Indian Ocean World: Bordering on Danger. Berlin, Germany: Springer. ISBN 9781349948574.
- Harley, Simon; Lovell, Tony. (2017) "Persian Gulf – The Dreadnought Project". www.dreadnoughtproject.org. Harley and Lovell.
- Kindell, Don. (2012) "North Atlantic Command, Force H, South Atlantic Command, America & West Indies Command, Eastern Fleet, January 1942". www.naval-history.net. Gordon Smith.
- Macris, Jeffrey R. (2010). The Politics and Security of the Gulf: Anglo-American Hegemony and the Shaping of a Region. Cambridge, England: Routledge. ISBN 9781135189440.
- Naval Review. (1959) "OP SHIPS" Volume 47: 105.
- Onley, James. "Britain's Native Agents in Arabia and Persia in the Nineteenth Century1" (PDF). socialsciences.exeter.ac.uk. University of Exeter, England.
- Pollock, Arthur William Alsager (1861). "List of the Indian Navy in Commission". The United Service Magazine. London. H. Colburn.
- Residency, Persian Gulf Political; Agency, Muscat Political; (Kuwait), British Political Agency; Agency, Qatar Political; Agency, Trucial States Political; Agency, Bahrain Political; Residency, Bushire Political (1990). Political Diaries of the Persian Gulf: 1935–35. London, England: Archive Editions. ISBN 9781852072506.
- The Navy List. (1915) "Flag Officers in Commission". London England: HM Stationery Office.
- The Navy List. (1944) "Flag Officers in Commission". London, England: H. M. Stationery Office.
