= HMS Sheba =

Former Royal Navy shore base at Steamer Point (now Tawahi) on the Arabian Peninsula

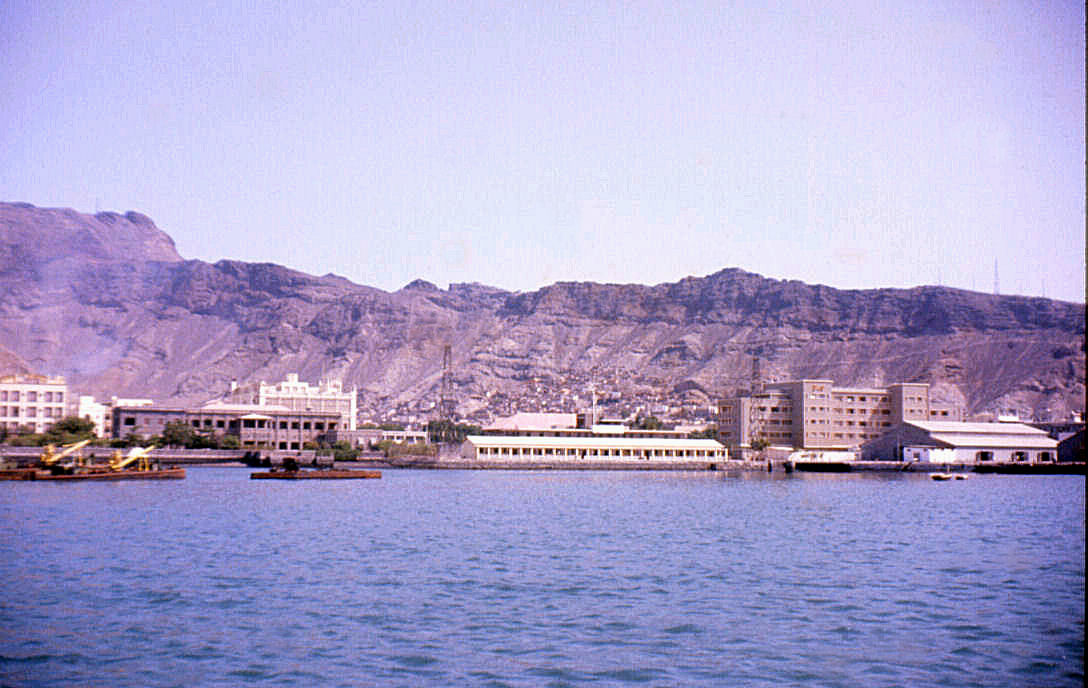
Steamer Point with HMS Sheba - the long low building in the centre.

HMS Sheba also known as HM Naval Base, Aden was a Royal Navy shore base at Steamer Point (now Tawahi) in Aden. It was closed after South Yemen achieved independence in 1967.

During the Second World War the senior naval administrative authority was the Naval Officer-in-Charge, Aden (1935–46), and the Red Sea Force was active, including against the Italians.

After the 1961 Kuwait crisis Flag Officer, Middle East moved his headquarters to Steamer Point in Aden. The renamed British Forces Aden, now Middle East Command, also included the Amphibious Warfare Squadron from the same time.

== See also ==
- RAF Hiswa
- List of Royal Navy shore establishments
