= Frederick Hards =

RAF Air Vice-Marshal (1889-1963)

Air Vice-Marshal Frederick Hards CBE DSC DFC
- Born: 17 March 1889; Cookham, Berkshire
- Died: 10 July 1963 (aged 74); Ipswich, Suffolk
- Military career
- Allegiance: United Kingdom
- Branch: Royal Navy (1914–18); Royal Air Force (1918–43)
- Service years: 1914–1943
- Rank: Air Vice-Marshal
- Commands: British Forces Aden (1941–43); RAF Malta (1930–31); No. 230 Squadron (1920–21)
- Conflicts: First World War; Second World War
- Awards: Commander of the Order of the British Empire; Distinguished Service Cross; Distinguished Flying Cross; Mentioned in Despatches

Frederick George Darby Hards (17 April 1889 – 10 July 1963) was a Royal Air Force officer who served as Air Officer Commanding British Forces Aden from 1941 until his retirement in 1943.

== Military career ==
Hards joined the Royal Fusiliers in 1914 and then served in the First World War as a pilot with the Royal Naval Air Service. He received his aviator's certificate in 1915. After the war he became Officer Commanding No. 230 Squadron and then, after various staff positions, he was appointed Officer Commanding RAF Malta in 1930. He went on to be Fleet Aviation Officer to Commander-in-Chief Mediterranean Fleet in 1933 and Senior Engineering Staff Officer at Fighter Command in 1936.

Hards served in the Second World War as Senior Air Staff Officer and then Air Officer Administration at Coastal Command before becoming Air Officer Administration and then Air Officer Commanding British Forces Aden; he retired in 1943.

== Honours and awards ==
- 22 June 1916 – Flight Lieutenant Vincent Nicholl and Flight Lieutenant Frederick George Darby Hards, RNAS are both awarded the Distinguished Service Cross:

In recognition of their services on the morning of the 25th April, 1916, when they pursued a Zeppelin 65 miles out to sea, dived to within a few hundred feet of it, and attacked it with bombs and darts.

— London Gazette

- 1 October 1917 – Flight Commander Fred George Darby Hards, RNAS was mentioned in despatches for services on patrol duties and submarine searching in home waters.
- 3 June 1918 – Lieutenant (temporary Captain) Frederick George Darby Hards, DSC was awarded the Distinguished Flying Cross for distinguished service.
- 11 July 1940 – Air Commodore (now Acting Air Vice-Marshal) Frederick George Darby Hards, DSC, DFC, Royal Air Force is appointed a Commander of the Order of the British Empire for distinguished services rendered during recent operations.

Military offices
Preceded by George Reid	Air Officer Commanding British Forces Aden; 1941–1943	Succeeded by Frank McNamara
