= HMS Stag =

Six ships of the Royal Navy and one naval base have borne the name HMS Stag:

- HMS Stag (1758) was a 32-gun Niger-class frigate launched on 4 September 1758. She was reduced to a 28-gun sixth rate in 1777, but restored as a 32-gun fifth rate in 1779. She was broken up in July 1783 at Deptford.
- HMS Stag (1794) was a 32-gun fifth rate launched in 1794 and wrecked in 1800 at Vigo Bay.
- HMS Stag (1812) was a 36-gun fifth rate launched in 1812 and broken up in 1821.
- HMS Stag (1830) was a 46-gun fifth rate launched in 1830, breaking up completed in 1866.
- HMS Stag (1861) was a coastguard yawl launched in 1861 and sold in 1891.
- HMS Stag (1899) was the sole member of the Stag class of D-class destroyer, was launched in 1899 by John I. Thornycroft & Company. She survived World War I to be sold in 1921.
- HMS Stag (shore establishment) was the name used for the base for British naval personnel in Egypt. First established at Port Said, it commissioned 8 January 1940. There were outposts at Adabya, Kabrit, Ismailia, Generiffa, Port Tewfik and Haifa in Palestine. It was paid off in May 1949.

== Hired armed cutter ==
- HM Hired armed cutter Stag, of 13374/94 tons (bm) and fourteen 4-pounder guns, served under contract from 31 August 1795 to 22 October 1801.
- HM hired armed cutter Stag, of 5725/94 tons (bm) and six 3-pounder guns, served under contract between 26 March 1804 and 24 December 1804.
