= British Forces Aden =

British Forces stationed in the Aden Protectorate

Aden Command (RAF) (1928–1936) British Forces (in) Aden (1936–1956) British Forces Arabian Peninsula (1956–1961)
- Active: 1928–1961
- Country: United Kingdom
- Branch: Royal Air Force
- Engagements: Aden Emergency

British Forces Aden was the name given to the British Armed Forces stationed in the Aden Protectorate during part of the 20th century. Their purpose was to preserve the security of the Protectorate from both internal threats and external aggression.

== History ==
British Forces Aden was originally formed as Aden Command in 1928. On its establishment, Aden Command was a Royal Air Force (RAF) command which was responsible for the control all British armed forces in the Protectorate. It was renamed British Forces in Aden, or simply British Forces Aden, in 1936 and renamed again in 1956 as British Forces Arabian Peninsula. In 1959 Middle East Command was divided into two commands split by the Suez Canal. The two parts were British Forces Arabian Peninsular, which was based at Aden, and the remnants in Cyprus which on 1 March 1961 was renamed Near East Command.

On 1 March 1961 British Forces Arabian Peninsula was renamed, again, this time as Middle East Command (Aden). The senior commanders were Air Marshal Sir Charles Elworthy, C-in-C Middle East; Rear Admiral Talbot, Flag Officer, Middle East; Major General Jim Robertson, GOC Middle East Land Forces; Air Vice Marshal David Lee, Air Officer Commanding, Air Forces Middle East, and GOC East Africa Command. The GOC and AOC were working from the command HQ at Aden while FOME initially was at Bahrain with his headquarters at HMS Juffair. FOME moved to HMS Sheba in the naval dockyard at Steamer Point after the 1961 Kuwait crisis (Walker, Aden Insurgency, 90); Rear Admiral Talbot seemingly moved on May 1, 1962. Naval forces reportedly included three frigates, the Amphibious Warfare Squadron, the commando carrier HMS Bulwark, and 45 Commando Royal Marines based ashore at Aden. 45 Commando had arrived on 23 April 1960, disembarking from Dunera, and settling in BP Camp, which had been turned over by 1st Battalion, Royal Warwickshire Regiment.

At the end of November 1967, following the British withdrawal from Aden at the end of the Emergency, the remaining British Forces in the Arabian Peninsula, including units at Salalah and Masirah, were reorganized under Headquarters British Forces Gulf, which was based at RAF Muharraq in Bahrain. British Forces Gulf was placed under the command of Rear Admiral John E. L. Martin, previously the last Flag Officer, Middle East, who handed over to Air Vice Marshal S B Grant on 4 April 1968.

The last overall Commander British Forces Gulf (CBFG) during the final military withdrawal in 1971 was Major-General Roland Gibbs. His primary mission between 1970 and late 1971 was overseeing the systematic drawdown of British forces in the Persian Gulf. During this final year, he successfully managed the "run-down" of the garrison, coordinated counter-insurgency support for the Sultan of Oman in the Dhofar War, and helped split the Trucial Oman Scouts into the individual armed forces that would serve the newly independent United Arab Emirates.

The command was disbanded on 15 December 1971. No. 8 Squadron RAF at Bahrain appears to have disbanded six days later on 21 December 1971.

== Units in 1939 ==
The structure of the units based in Aden in 1939:

=== Aden Colony ===
- Headquarters
- Aden Squadron, Royal Corps of Signals
- Aden Protectorate Levies – 4 Battalions
- 2/5th Battalion, Mahratta Light Infantry
- 20th Fortress Company, Royal Engineers
- 5th Heavy Regiment, Royal Artillery
- 9th Field Battery, Royal Artillery
- 15th Air Defence Battery, Hong Kong and Singapore Royal Artillery

== Commanders ==
Commanders have included:

=== Aden Command ===
- 8 March 1928 Group Captain W G S Mitchell
- 5 September 1929 Group Captain C T MacLean (later Air Commodore)
- 7 August 1931 Group Captain O T Boyd
- 20 January 1934 Group Captain C F A Portal (Air Commodore from January 1935)
- 2 December 1935 Air Vice-Marshal E L Gossage

=== British Forces Aden ===
- 1 July 1936 Air Commodore W A McClaughry
- 28 September 1938 Air Vice-Marshal G R M Reid
- 10 September 1941 Air Vice-Marshal F G D Hards
- 12 January 1943 Air Vice-Marshal F H MacNamara (RAAF)
- 12 March 1945 Air Vice-Marshal H T Lydford
- 8 March 1948 Air Vice-Marshal A C Stevens
- 1 March 1950 Air Vice-Marshal F J Fressanges
- 11 March 1952 Air Vice-Marshal D Macfadyen
- 12 October 1953 Air Vice-Marshal S O Bufton
- 17 September 1955 Air Vice-Marshal L F Sinclair

=== British Forces Arabian Peninsula ===
- 30 September 1957 Air Vice-Marshal M L Heath
- 19 September 1959 Air Chief Marshal Sir Hubert Patch
- 3 August 1960 Air Marshal Sir Charles Elworthy

== Commanders (Air Forces) ==
=== Air Forces Middle East ===
- 1959 Air Chief Marshal DJ Pryer Lee
- 1961 Air Chief Marshal F Rosier
- 1963 Air commodore J E Johnson
- 15 December 1965 Air Vice-Marshal AH Humphrey

== See also ==
- RAF Khormaksar
- List of British Army installations
- List of Royal Air Force commands

== Bibliography ==
- Thomas, Andy (March–April 1999). "Red Sea Guardians: The Story of the Aden Defence Flight". Air Enthusiast (80): 2–4. ISSN 0143-5450.
- Ash Rossiter, Security in the Gulf: Local Militaries before British Withdrawal, pp. 209 - 270, Cambridge University Press, 2020. DOI: https://doi.org/10.1017/9781108770330.008.
- Shohei Sato, Britain's withdrawal from the Persian Gulf, 1964-1971: A Study of Informal Empire, D.Phil thesis, University of Oxford, 2011.
