= Flag Officer Commanding North Atlantic =

- Active: c.1940–1945
- Country: United Kingdom
- Branch: Royal Navy
- Garrison/HQ: Gibraltar

The Flag Officer Commanding, North Atlantic was an operational commander of the Royal Navy between 1939 and 1943. His subordinate units, establishments, and staff were charged with the administration of the RN Naval Base, Gibraltar and North Atlantic geographic area. The admiral commanding's post later became the Flag Officer Gibraltar.

== History ==
HMS Cormorant (1877) became a receiving ship at Gibraltar in 1889. She became a flag ship when Rear-Admiral Sir William Acland hoisted his flag on board the Cormorant when he was appointed Admiral Superintendent of the HM Dockyard Gibraltar in October 1902. Cormorant remained the ship to which personnel serving not in other capacities in Gibraltar during the Second World War were attached to.

In December 1940 Admiral Sir Dudley North became Rear Admiral-in-Charge, Gibraltar [later: Flag Officer Commanding North Atlantic] & Admiral Superintendent HM Dockyard, Gibraltar. The renamed Flag Officer Commanding North Atlantic had responsibility for the sea lanes on either side of the Straits of Gibraltar. The flag officer's mission was often unclear due to the operations of both Force H and the Western Approaches Command. Ambiguity of responsibility between Gibraltar and Force H led to confusion in the conduct of operations.

On 1 January 1941 Vice-Admiral Frederick Edward-Collins became Flag Officer Commanding North Atlantic.

The division of responsibility between Vice-Admiral Edward-Collins as Flag Officer Commanding North Atlantic "..and the Flag Officer Force H and the Commander in Chief Mediterranean was defined as follows:

..F.O.C.N.A. was responsible for preventing the passage of Gibraltar Strait by all enemy vessels and by vessels of other nations as may be ordered by the Admiralty from time to time.

While Force H was based on Gibraltar, F.O.C.N.A. was to call on, Flag Officer, Force H for such assistance as be necessary. Except when directed to carry out specific tasks by the Admiralty.

Edward-Collins was promoted to admiral on 21 January 1943, reappointed as Admiral, Gibraltar in continuation, and retired on 7 February 1944.

Forces based at Gibraltar during the war included:

- 11th Cruiser Squadron, with HMS Colombo and HMS Capetown, in September and October 1939.
- 13th Destroyer Flotilla September 1939–May 1945
- 8th Submarine Flotilla December 1940–December 1942 (flotilla then moved to Algiers)
- 28, 36, 37, 38 Escort Groups were based at Gibraltar whilst forming part of Western Approaches Command.

== Admirals commanding ==
Included:

Rank	Name	Title	Term
Rear-Admiral	Norman Wodehouse	Rear-Admiral, Gibraltar	May 1939-1 November 1939
Vice-Admiral	Sir Dudley North	Vice-Admiral, Gibraltar	1 November 1939 – 9 December 1940
Vice-Admiral	Sir Frederick Edward-Collins	FOC North Atlantic on appointment Vice-Admiral, Gibraltar; Admiral, Gibraltar	1 January 1941 – February 1944
Vice-Admiral	Sir Harold Martin Burrough	FO Gibraltar and Mediterranean Approaches	February 1944–January 1945

== See also ==
- Gibdock
- HMS Rooke (1946 shore establishment)
