= Dudley North (Royal Navy officer) =

Royal Navy Admiral (1881–1961)

Admiral Sir Dudley North GCVO CB CSI CMG
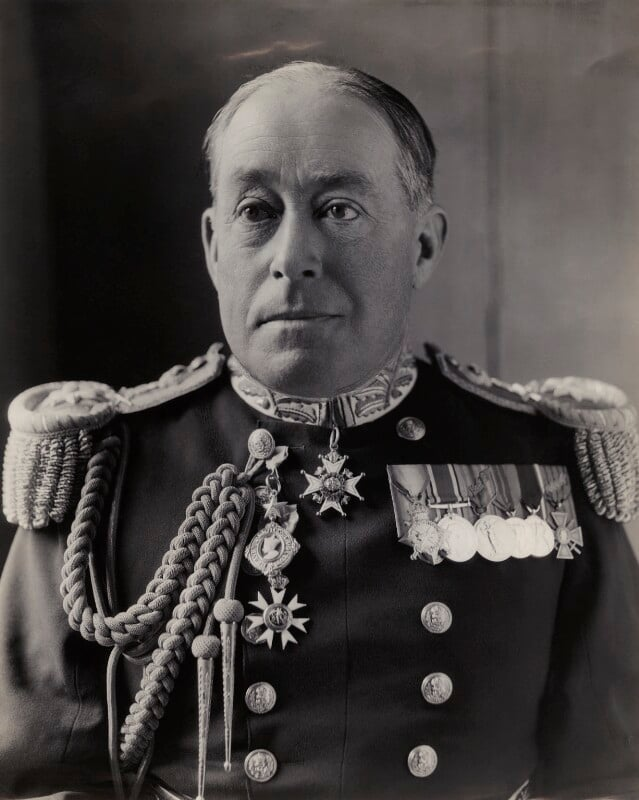
- North in 1936
- Born: 25 November 1881; Great Yarmouth, Norfolk
- Died: 15 May 1961 (aged 79); Parnham, Beaminster, Dorset
- Military career
- Allegiance: United Kingdom
- Branch: Royal Navy
- Service years: 1897–1946
- Rank: Admiral
- Commands: Great Yarmouth (1942–1945); Gibraltar and Mediterranean Approaches (1939–1940); Royal Squadron (1939); Royal Yachts (1934–1939); HMS Tiger (1929); HMS Constance (1927–1929); HMS Revenge (1926–1927); HMS Caledon (1922–1923); HMS New Zealand (1915–1916)
- Conflicts: First World War: Battle of Heligoland Bight; Battle of Dogger Bank; Battle of Jutland; Second World War
- Awards: Knight Grand Cross of the Royal Victorian Order; Companion of the Order of the Bath; Companion of the Order of the Star of India; Companion of the Order of St Michael and St George; Commander of the Legion of Merit (United States); Commander of the Order of St Stanislaus with Swords (Russia); Croix de Guerre (France); Order of the Rising Sun, 3rd Class (Japan); Order of the Nile, 2nd Class (Egypt); Order of Merit of Chile

Admiral Sir Dudley Burton Napier North, GCVO, CB, CSI, CMG (25 November 1881 – 15 May 1961) was a Royal Navy officer who served during First and Second World Wars. He was relieved of his command in 1940 in controversial circumstances.

== Naval career ==
The son of Colonel Roger North of the Royal Artillery, Dudley North entered the Royal Navy as a cadet in 1896, passed out of HMS Britannia in 1897, and was confirmed as sub-lieutenant on 15 March 1901. He was appointed to HMS Charger on 31 December 1902, while she was serving the Devonport instructional flotilla.

During the First World War, North saw action at the battles of Heligoland, Dogger Bank, and Jutland.

He became Director of Naval Operations in January 1930 and Flag Officer Commanding, Royal Yachts in December 1934. Chief of Staff, Home Fleet in December 1932 He was promoted vice-admiral on 19 June 1936.

=== Second World War and relief of command ===
North became Vice-Admiral, Gibraltar in November 1939 and was promoted admiral on 8 May 1940. After the sinking of the French fleet at Mers-el-Kébir on 3 July 1940, North wrote a letter criticizing the operation to the Admiralty. Prime Minister Winston Churchill and First Lord of the Admiralty A. V. Alexander called for him to be replaced, but the First Sea Lord, Sir Dudley Pound, disagreed. In the end, North was reprimanded by the Admiralty.

Two months later, on 11 September 1940, North did not challenge a Vichy French squadron of three cruisers and three destroyers sailing through the Strait of Gibraltar, from Toulon to Dakar. North had ambiguous instructions as to whether he should challenge the French squadron. Owing to mistakes in the handling of signals, the Admiralty's instructions to North were not sent.

The Admiralty decided to relieve North of his command in October, though the changeover did not take place until December 1940. Vice-Admiral Sir James Somerville wrote to the Admiralty to take responsibility for the failure to act, but the Admiralty absolved him of any blame. After his relief, North retired on 25 December 1941. He served for a time in the Home Guard, then was appointed Flag Officer-in-Charge, Great Yarmouth in 1943, for which service he was appointed a Commander of the US Legion of Merit.

He attempted to clear his name, and requested a court of inquiry or court-martial on numerous occasions. In 1955, five admirals of the fleet signed a letter supporting North, and in 1957 four of them visited prime minister Harold Macmillan, urging him to clear North's name. There was also debate in Parliament, with speakers from both sides. Viscount Alexander of Hillsborough, who had been First Lord of the Admiralty at the time of North's relief, opposed any review of his case in the House of Lords. Among North's defenders was Ludovic Kennedy, who considered the failure to challenge the squadron the fault of people in London, not North. In 1957, Macmillan partially, though not entirely, exonerated North of blame.

== Personal life ==
North married Eglantine Campbell in September 1909 in Sydney, where he was serving on HMS Powerful. Eglantine died in 1917 of pernicious anaemia. North later married Eilean Graham in 1923 and they had four children. Their daughter Elizabeth was a novelist.

== Honours and decorations ==
- Knight Grand Cross of the Royal Victorian Order 12 June 1947 (KCVO 1937)
- Companion of the Order of the Bath 1935
- Companion of the Order of the Star of India 1922
- Companion of the Order of St Michael and St George
- Commander of the Legion of Merit (United States) 30 April 1946

Military offices
Preceded by Norman Wodehouse	Flag Officer Commanding Gibraltar and Mediterranean Approaches; 1939–1940	Succeeded by Sir Frederick Edward-Collins
