= Neville Syfret =

Royal Navy Admiral (1889–1972)

Admiral Sir Neville Syfret GCB KBE
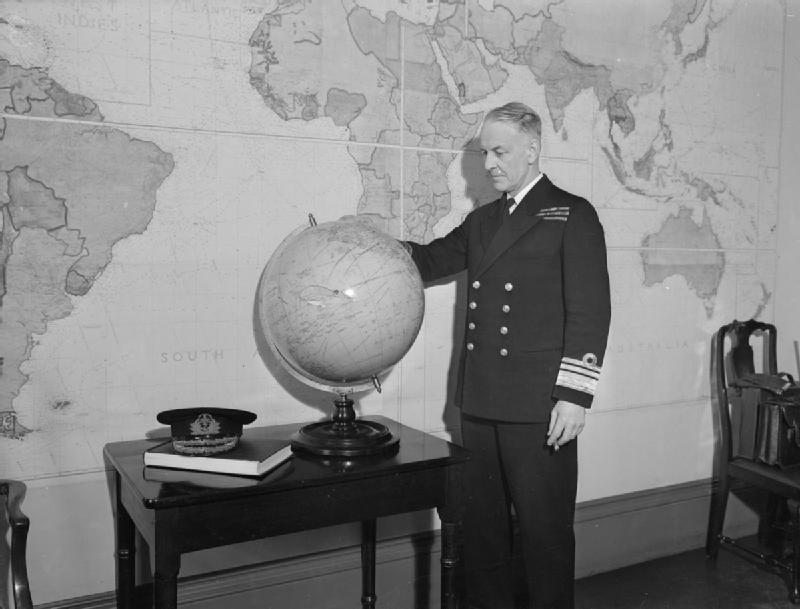
- Vice-Admiral Syfret in his office at the Admiralty, January 1944
- Born: 20 June 1889; Newlands, South Africa
- Died: 10 December 1972 (aged 83); Highgate, England
- Children: 2
- Military career
- Allegiance: United Kingdom
- Branch: Royal Navy
- Service years: 1904–1948
- Rank: Admiral
- Commands: Home Fleet (1945–48); Force H (1942–43); 18th Cruiser Squadron (1941); HMS Rodney (1938–39); HMS Ramillies (1938); Naval Gunnery School, Devonport (1934–35); HMS Caradoc (1932–34)
- Conflicts: First World War; Second World War
- Awards: Knight Grand Cross of the Order of the Bath; Knight Commander of the Order of the British Empire; Mentioned in Despatches; Commander of the Legion of Merit (United States); Croix de guerre (France)

Admiral Sir Edward Neville Syfret, GCB, KBE (20 June 1889 – 10 December 1972) was a senior officer in the Royal Navy who saw service in both World Wars. He was knighted for his part in Operation Pedestal, the critical Malta convoy, in the Second World War.

== Naval career ==
Born the son of Edward Ridge Syfret of Cape Town in South Africa and educated at Diocesan College, South Africa and the Britannia Royal Naval College, Syfret joined the Royal Navy in 1904 and, in his early service years, specialised in naval gunnery. He played in a Navy v Army cricket match at Lord's in 1911 and 1912.

=== First World War ===
In World War I he became gunnery officer in the light cruisers HMS Aurora, HMS Centaur and HMS Curacoa.

=== Inter War Years ===
In 1927 he was fleet gunnery officer, Mediterranean Fleet. With the rank of commander he was appointed to HMS Volunteer in 1928 before promotion to captain the following year. In 1932 he was put in command of HMS Caradoc on the China Station in 1932.

=== Second World War ===
Syfret served in the Second World War initially as Captain of HMS Rodney. In 1939 he became Naval Secretary. He was made commander of the 18th Cruiser Squadron of the Home Fleet in 1941 and commanded the naval forces during Operation Ironclad, the invasion of Madagascar in May 1942 and was convoy commander for Operation Pedestal, a critical Malta Convoy in August 1942. Following Pedestal he was made a KCB "for bravery and dauntless resolution in fighting an important convoy through to Malta in the face of relentless attacks by day and night from enemy submarines, aircraft and surface forces."

He was appointed Commander of Force H later that year and then, in 1943, became Vice Chief of the Naval Staff.

After the war he became Commander-in-Chief of the Home Fleet; he retired in 1948.

== Family ==
In 1913 he married Hildegarde Warner. They had one son and one daughter.

Military offices
Preceded by Stuart Bonham Carter	Naval Secretary; 1939–1941	Succeeded by Arthur Peters
Preceded by Sir Henry Moore	Vice Chief of the Naval Staff; 1943–1945	Succeeded by Sir Rhoderick McGrigor
Preceded by Sir Henry Moore	Commander in Chief, Home Fleet; 1945–1948	Succeeded by Sir Rhoderick McGrigor
