= Henry Ruthven Moore =

Royal Navy Admiral (1886–1978)

Admiral Sir Henry Moore GCB CVO DSO
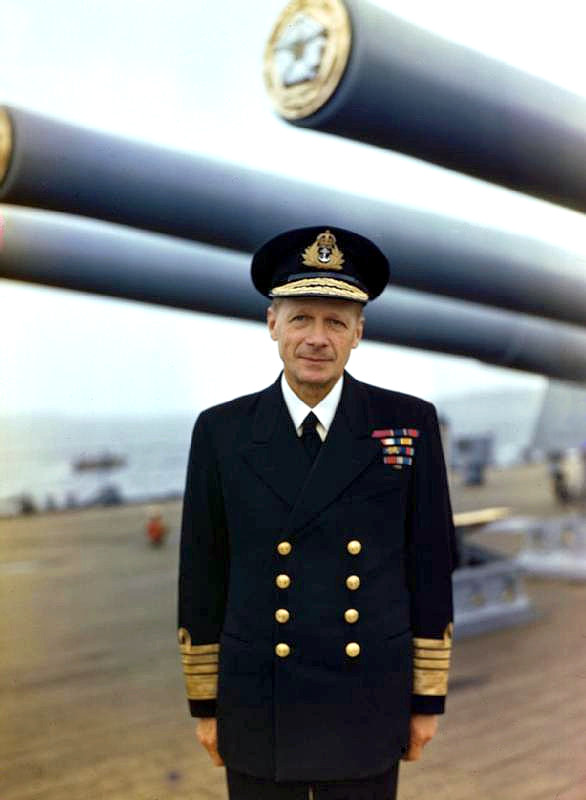
- Admiral Moore under the guns of his flagship HMS Duke of York at Scapa Flow
- Born: 29 August 1886; Plumstead, Kent
- Died: 12 March 1978 (aged 91); Wateringbury, Kent
- Military career
- Allegiance: United Kingdom
- Branch: Royal Navy
- Service years: 1902–1950
- Rank: Admiral
- Commands: HMS Caradoc; HMS Dauntless; HMS Neptune; Home Fleet; Nore Command
- Conflicts: World War I World War II
- Awards: Knight Grand Cross of the Order of the Bath; Commander of the Royal Victorian Order; Distinguished Service Order; Mentioned in Despatches; Legion of Merit (United States)

Admiral Sir Henry Ruthven Moore, GCB, CVO, DSO (29 August 1886 – 12 March 1978) was the last British admiral to command the Home Fleet during World War II. He served in that post from 1944 to 1945.

== Naval career ==
Educated at Sherborne, Moore joined the Royal Navy in 1902. He served in World War I taking part in the Battle of Jutland in 1916.

After the war Moore joined the staff of the Royal Naval College, Greenwich and then became Naval Assistant Secretary to the Committee of Imperial Defence. Between 1928 and 1930 he commanded the cruisers HMS Caradoc and HMS Dauntless. He was appointed Deputy Director of Plans in 1930 and then took command of the cruiser HMS Neptune in 1933. He went on to be Chief of Staff for the Home Fleet in 1936 and Chief of Staff to the Commander-in-Chief, Portsmouth in 1938.

He served in World War II initially as Commander of 3rd Cruiser Squadron and then as Assistant Chief of the Naval Staff from 1940. He became Vice Chief of the Naval Staff in 1941, Commander of the 2nd Battle Squadron in June 1943 and Commander-in-Chief of the Home Fleet in 1944.

After the War he was appointed Head of the British Naval Mission in Washington, D.C., and then became the first Chairman of the Military Staff Committee of the United Nations Security Council in 1946. His final appointment was as Commander-in-Chief, The Nore in 1948. He retired in 1951.

Military offices
Preceded by New post	Vice Chief of the Naval Staff; 1941–1943	Succeeded by Sir Edward Syfret
Preceded by Lord Fraser of North Cape	Commander in Chief, Home Fleet; 1944–1945	Succeeded by Sir Edward Syfret
Preceded by Sir Harold Burrough	Commander-in-Chief, The Nore; 1948–1950	Succeeded by Sir Cecil Harcourt
Honorary titles
Preceded by Lord Fraser of North Cape	First and Principal Naval Aide-de-Camp; 1948–1949	Succeeded by Sir Arthur Power
