= Force H =

World War II British naval squadron

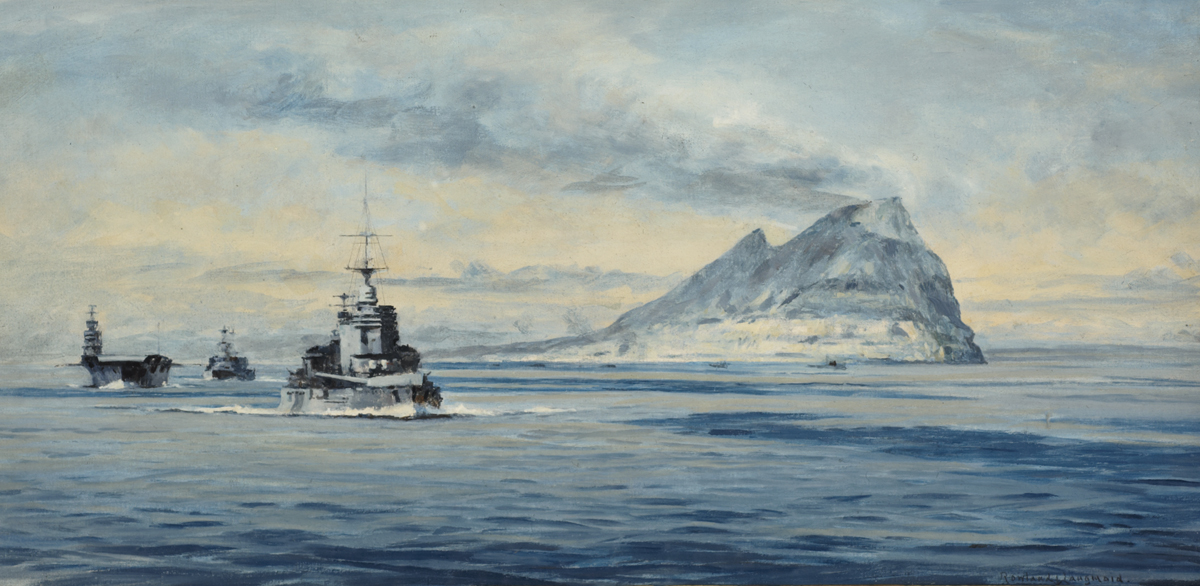
- Force H off Gibraltar in 1940 by Rowland Langmaid
- Active: June 1940 – October 1943
- Country: United Kingdom
- Branch: Royal Navy
- Engagements: Battle of the Mediterranean; Attack on Mers-el-Kébir; Battle of Cape Spartivento; Last battle of Bismarck

Commanders
- Notable commanders: James Somerville (June 1940 – January 1942); Neville Syfret (January 1942 – March 1943); Algernon Willis (March 1943 – October 1943)

Force H was a British Royal Navy detached squadron during the Second World War. It was formed in June 1940 with Gibraltar as its base, initially to replace the French fleet in the western Mediterranean after France agreed separate armistices with Nazi Germany and Fascist Italy, effectively becoming a neutral country. The presence of Force H, under the leadership of Vice-Admiral Sir James Somerville, kept the Italian fleet looking in two directions, as the Regia Marina was also threatened by the main British Mediterranean fleet based in Alexandria in Egypt.

The squadron's first operation remains controversial, as it was ordered to present an ultimatum to, and consequently attack, the French fleet at Mers-el-Kébir. Force H went on to play a vital role in the Battle of the Mediterranean. The squadron successfully guarded the Strait of Gibraltar, and did much to keep Malta, with its critical naval and air bases, supplied during its long siege. Force H carried out many Club Run missions, which involved ferrying combat aeroplanes part of the way to Malta, which then flew off aircraft carriers to complete the journey. Many of Britain's most famous warships in World War II served in Force H.

In one of its more audacious operations, Force H attacked the major Italian port of Genoa. It also operated in the Atlantic, famously during the sinking of the Bismarck in May 1941.

In January 1942, Somerville left for Colombo in the Indian Ocean to take command of the Eastern Fleet and was replaced at Force H by Vice-Admiral Neville Syfret, who was later succeeded by Vice-Admiral Algernon Willis. Later operations involved providing naval cover for Allied amphibious landings in the Mediterranean. By autumn 1943, the Allies dominated the Mediterranean Sea, and thus needed fewer heavy surface warships in that theatre. This led to Force H's dispersal in October 1943.

== Forerunner and establishment ==
During the opening months of World War II, there was an unconnected Royal Navy 'Force H', stationed in Cape Town and composed of the heavy cruisers HMS Sussex and HMS Shropshire. This was deployed as part of the hunt for the German pocket battleship, Admiral Graf Spee, which was commerce raiding in the Atlantic and Indian Oceans. The scuttling of Admiral Graf Spee off of Montevideo during the Battle of the River Plate against another Royal Navy flotilla, Force G, led to the disbandment of this early Force H.

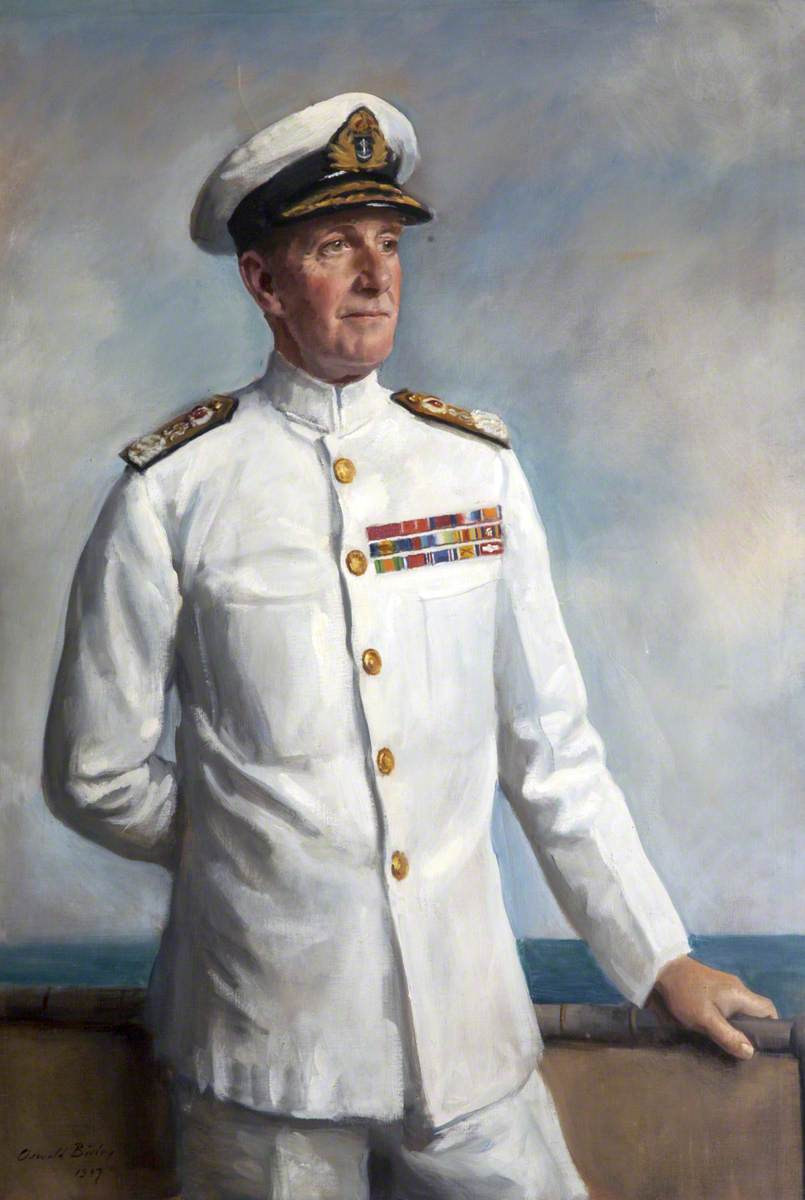
Somerville in 1947, by Oswald Birley

On 10 June 1940, Italy declared war on the Allies and entered the Battle of France, bringing its large Mediterranean fleet into the war on the Axis side. That same day, Italy launched its first air raids against Malta, which contained vital British air and naval bases, initiating a long siege of the islands. Then in late June, France agreed separate armistices with Nazi Germany and Italy, which both came into effect on 25 June, creating a crisis for the Royal Navy, as the French fleet withdrew from the war. There was also the concern over what might happen now to France's warships, and whether they might fall into Axis hands. The situation was made worse by the fact the Royal Navy, due to the risk of air attack, had relocated its Mediterranean Fleet under Admiral Andrew Cunningham from Malta to Alexandria, where it could no longer cover the area between Gibraltar and Sardinia. Consequently, Force H was established at Gibraltar as a detached squadron, to fill the vacuum created by the withdrawal from combat of the French Fleet. This secured the Strait of Gibraltar, preventing the Italian surface fleet from sailing into the Atlantic.

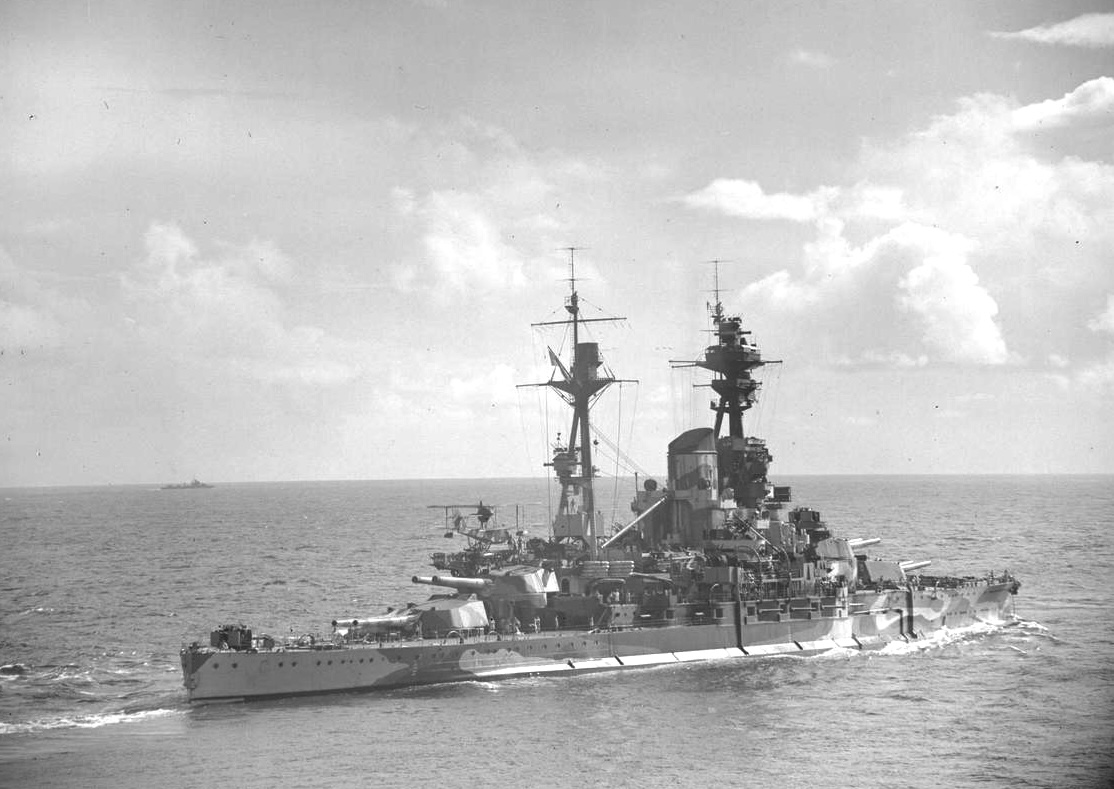
HMS Resolution at sea during World War II

On 23 June 1940, the Admiralty began assembling the ships that would become Force H, with the aircraft carrier HMS Ark Royal and the battlecruiser HMS Hood arriving at Gibraltar, joining HMS Resolution, a refitted Revenge-class battleship of World War I vintage. On 27 June, in London Vice-Admiral Somerville was given command of the new squadron, told to select a staff and depart for Gibraltar the following day on the light cruiser HMS Arethusa. Somerville and his staff arrived in Gibraltar on 30 June where his flag was transferred to Hood. Later that same day HMS Valiant, a modernised World War I-era Queen Elizabeth-class battleship, arrived from Scapa Flow. The light cruiser HMS Enterprise reached Gibraltar in early July. The eleven ships of the 8th Destroyer Flotilla and 13th Destroyer Flotilla completed Force H's establishment strength.

The force occupied an unorthodox place within the naval chain of command. Normal Royal Navy practice was to have stations and fleets around the world, whose commanders reported to the First Sea Lord via a flag officer. Force H was based at Gibraltar, and there was already a flag officer at the base in June 1940; Admiral Dudley North, Flag Officer Commanding, North Atlantic. However, Somerville did not report to North but directly to the First Sea Lord, Admiral of the Fleet Sir Dudley Pound. So, Force H enjoyed significant operational independence.

== Evolution of Force H ==
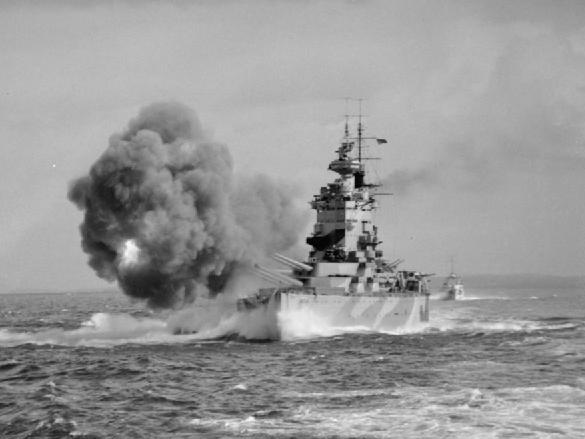
HMS Nelson fires her 16-inch guns during gunnery trials

Over the course of its lifetime, June 1940 to October 1943, Force H saw considerable turnover of ships. In part, this was due to changing needs, vessels returning to Britain for repairs, combat losses and replacements. Also, many ships were briefly attached for specific missions or even just while passing through its area of operation. As a result, Somerville’s flagship changed several times - as well as Hood, the battlecruiser HMS Renown, the battleships HMS Malaya, HMS Nelson and HMS Rodney, and the carrier Ark Royal, would at different times serve in that role. There was also some redeployment between Force H and the Mediterranean Fleet in Alexandria with the battleships HMS Barham, Malaya and Valiant at different times serving in both. Force H was also a mix of the old and new, with brand-new warships serving alongside vessels that had fought at the Battle of Jutland in 1916.

Konstam described Ark Royal as "the real core of Force H", although other aircraft carriers served on occasion with the squadron. These ranged from the smaller and obsolescent HMS Argus, HMS Eagle and HMS Furious, to modern fleet carriers like HMS Formidable, HMS Illustrious and HMS Victorious. Possession of carriers gave the Royal Navy a major strategic advantage over the Regia Marina, although many Fleet Air Arm (FAA) aeroplanes in 1940-1941 were obsolescent or underwhelming as the best aircraft were typically given to Royal Air Force (RAF) squadrons defending the British mainland.

== Mers-el-Kébir ==
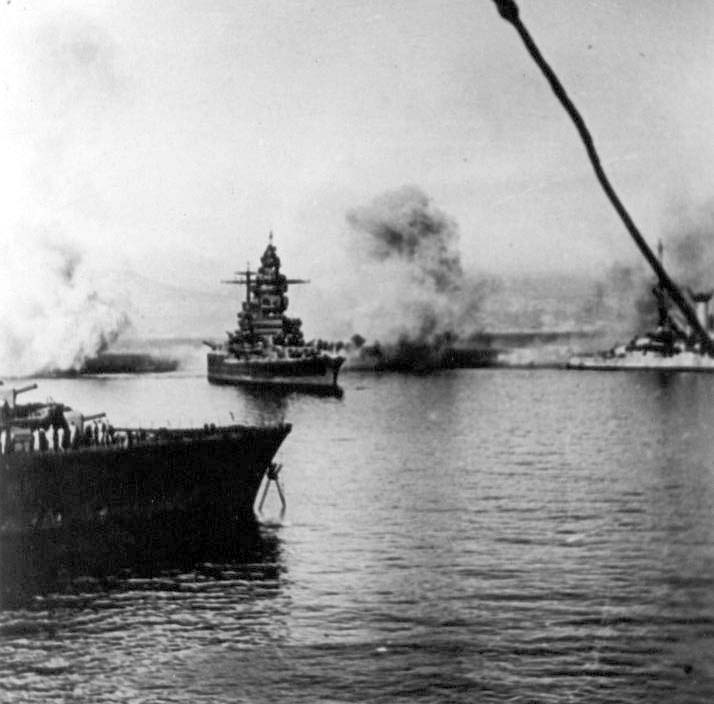
The French battleship Strasbourg under fire at Mers-el-Kébir, July 1940

Force H’s first operation saw it tasked with ending the uncertainty regarding the status of the French Mediterranean fleet. Despite promises by the French never to hand their warships over to Germany and Italy, the British government feared the Axis powers might seize Vichy France's navy. This would almost certainly tip the balance of naval power decisively against Britain in the Mediterranean. At Mers-el-Kébir in French Algeria was a large fleet including two battleships (Bretagne and Provence), two battlecruisers (Strasbourg and Dunkerque), three light cruisers, ten destroyers, four submarines and a large seaplane tender (Commandant Teste). On 23 June 1940 (two days before the armistice with Germany would come into effect), at a meeting with Admiral North, the French naval commander at Mers-el-Kébir, Admiral Marcel-Bruno Gensoul, gave an assurance he would destroy his ships before handing them over to the Axis. The armistice agreements required French warships overseas, other than those needed to protect colonies, return to metropolitan France to be demilitarised. Given that the French armed forces were about to be drastically reduced in size, with Axis garrisons established in German and Italian occupation zones inside France, it was impossible for London to know how successful a French scuttling would be in the face of a surprise attempted seizure.

Consequently, Somerville was ordered to execute Operation Catapult and deploy Force H off Mers-el-Kébir while presenting an ultimatum that gave Gensoul four options, or his ships would be fired upon. These were: 1. join the British and fight the Axis, 2. sail to British ports for internment, 3. sail to a French possession in the Caribbean, such as Martinique, to be either demilitarised or placed under US jurisdiction, 4. scuttle the ships. Somerville was personally unhappy with threatening to attack the French, and the captains of Force H's ships voiced the same opinion at a conference in Gibraltar.

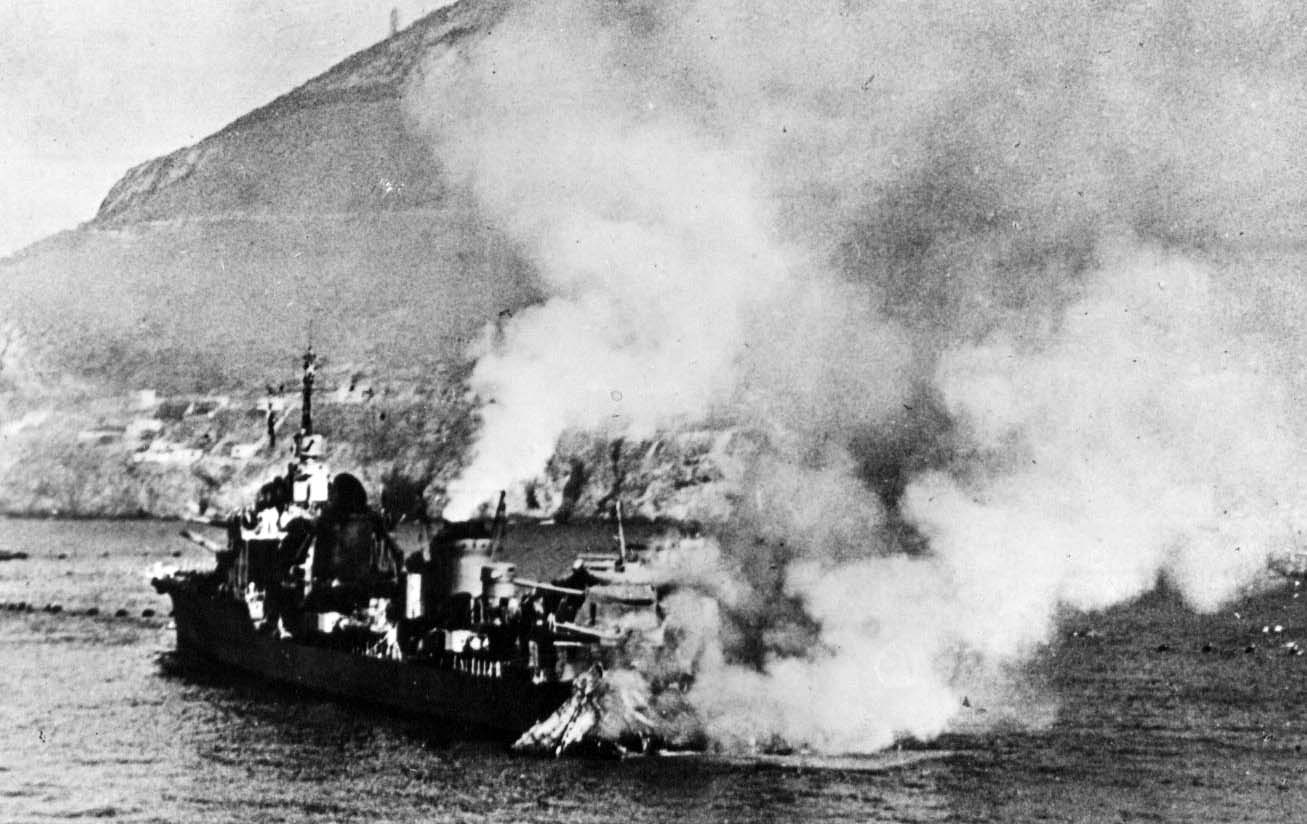
The French destroyer Mogador was hit by a 15-inch shell, detonating its depth charges

Force H arrived at Mers-el-Kébir on 3 July 1940. An envoy, Cedric Holland, the captain of Ark Royal, was sent ahead of the squadron in a destroyer, HMS Foxhound, to deliver the ultimatum to Admiral Gensoul in person. However, Gensoul initially refused to meet Holland, who had to send and receive messages via a French officer. Gensoul reported only the scuttling option to his superiors, an omission which he never subsequently gave an explanation for. Aircraft from Ark Royal reported that the French ships appeared to be preparing to sail, creating the risk of a sea battle. News arrived that Vice-Admiral Godfrey, the commander of the France's western Mediterranean squadron, Force X, had agreed to a peaceful internment of his ships at Alexandria. The news was passed to Gensoul, but the French Admiral threatened to set sail and fight, prompting the British to use aircraft to drop magnetic mines to block the harbour entrance.

Gensoul eventually agreed to a face-to-face meeting with Holland onboard Dunkerque. However, little progress was made other than Gensoul promising to take his fleet to the Americas if at a later date the Axis attempted to seize his ships. This offer was close to option 3 in the ultimatum, but was viewed by the British as inadequate as it did not offer to immediately depart for the Americas; and thus left open the possibility of the Axis successfully obtaining the ships at a future date. The conference ended with Gensoul refusing the British terms in writing. While Gensoul and Holland spoke, Somerville onboard Hood received a signal from the Admiralty warning that French naval reinforcements were on the way. As Holland left Dunkerque, the French ships sounded 'action stations'.

Map showing the deployment of the French fleet at Mers-el-Kébir

The ultimatum's deadline (which had been extended) expired at 17-30 hours, and Force H opened fire on the French ships at 17-54. By 18-04, having fired thirty six salvoes of 15-inch shells, the British ships ceased fire. Dunkerque and Provence were damaged and put out of action, Bretagne was destroyed, 1,299 French sailors had been killed and 350 were wounded. The French returned fire but achieved no direct hits. Thick smoke obscured Force H's view of the harbour, allowing Strasbourg and five destroyers to escape to sea. Having survived two unsuccessful attacks by British aircraft while at sea, Strasbourg and its escorts eventually reached Toulon. The next day, Somerville received a signal from Gensoul that his ships were Hors de combat, and Force H departed, returning to Gibraltar.

On 6 July, Fairey Swordfish torpedo bombers from Ark Royal were sent to launch another attack on Dunkerque, causing further damage, although the battlecruiser was later refloated.

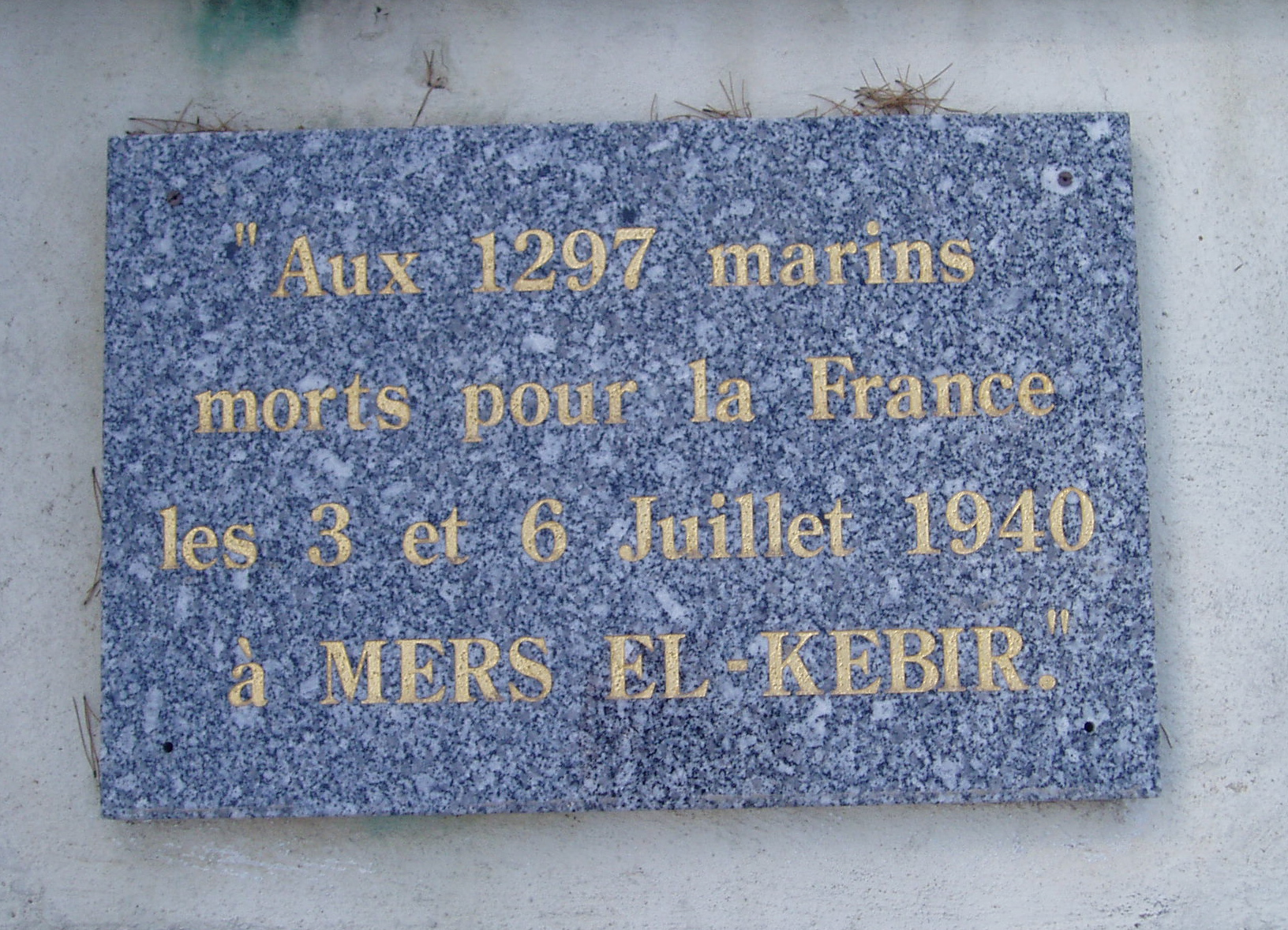
Memorial on the coast path at Toulon to the 1,297 French seamen killed at Mers El Kébir

Many Force H senior officers were left deeply unhappy with the course of events, especially firing upon former-allies. Indeed, Holland offered his resignation as captain of Ark Royal, but was persuaded to stay in his post. However, different opinions were found amongst the lower ranks. It was noted onboard Valiant that evidence the French ships were preparing to set sail, which would probably have meant a fleet battle, convinced many ratings and junior officers it was necessary to open fire.

In the aftermath of Mers El Kébir, Force H was tasked in with enforcing a naval blockade on Vichy French ships, military and civilian. In September 1940, some Force H ships, including Ark Royal, were temporarily assigned to Force M for Operation Menace, an unsuccessful attempt to pressure the Vichy French garrison and naval squadron at Dakar to join the Allies. In January 1941, there was an incident where a Force H boarding party met with resistance on a Vichy French merchant ship, and in the resulting gunfire bullet ricochets killed two civilians, one of them a child. From spring 1941, the task of monitoring Vichy French shipping was passed to long-range aircraft or warships in the region that were not part of Force H, in order to allow Somerville to concentrate on fighting the Regia Marina and supporting Malta.

== The Axis Threat ==
For Great Britain, of its possessions in the Mediterranean three were highly strategic for maintaining its Empire. Gibraltar and the Suez Canal zone allowed the Royal Navy to control who could transit between the Mediterranean and the Atlantic and the Red Sea. Malta was positioned in a choke point roughly at the centre, making it an ideal location to interdict traffic passing either east-west or from Italy to Africa. Most convoys of troops, equipment and supplies for the British army in the Kingdom of Egypt (in theory a neutral state, but effectively a British vassal) sailed from the UK around the Cape of Good Hope, reaching Suez via the Red Sea; a journey that took six weeks longer than passing through the Mediterranean. However, holding Gibraltar and Malta allowed dashes by convoys through the Mediterranean itself to Alexandria, offering a faster but high risk alternative route to rush troops and equipment to Egypt during emergencies.

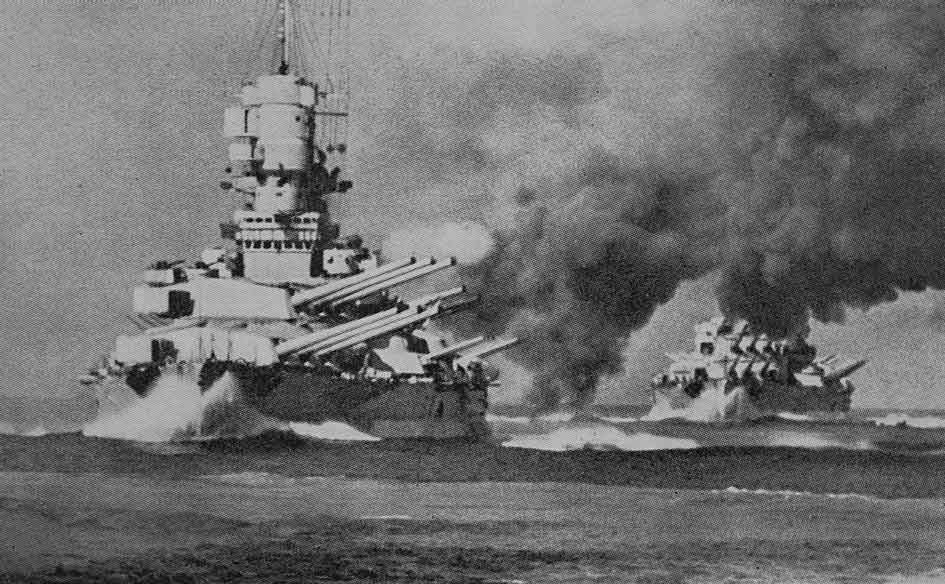
The modern Italian battleships, Vittorio Veneto and Littorio

Italy had a strong navy in 1940, with two brand new Littorio-class battleships (rising to three in 1942), five older battleships (two modernised), seven heavy cruisers, and various other cruisers, destroyers, submarines and smaller vessels. The Italians were pioneers in the use of MAS boats (a type of motor torpedo boat), and would innovate in World War II on using frogmen and human torpedoes for sabotage missions, at times achieving spectacular results. However, a major disadvantage was the Regia Marina's lack of aircraft carriers, a problem compounded by poor co-operation with the air force, the Regia Aeronautica. Also, following the inconclusive Battle of Calabria with the Royal Navy Mediterranean Fleet on 9 July 1940, the Regia Marina mostly pursued a fleet in being strategy, which handed the initiative to the British, something Cunningham and Somerville would fully exploit.

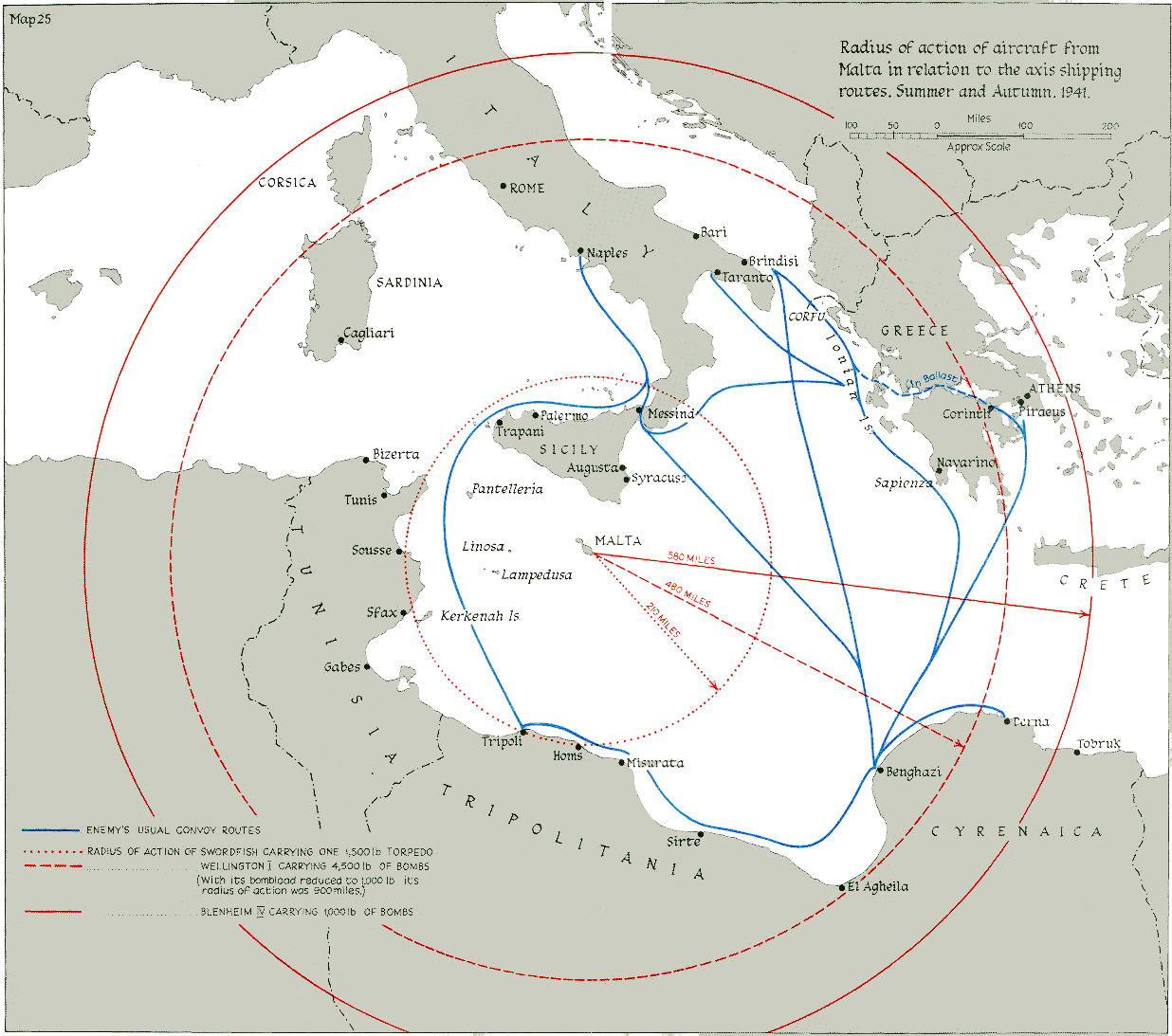
Allied air strike radius from Malta and Axis shipping routes, summer and autumn 1941

According to Keegan, France's defeat in June 1940 "provided Mussolini with the stimulus to reach for laurels in Africa". While Italy had a large army in Italian East Africa, it was immediately cut off from reinforcements and resupply by the outbreak of war, and thus capable of only limited offensives, such as the invasion of British Somaliland. Italy's other major African colony, Libya, offered stronger possibilities for a war of conquest, principally aimed at Egypt, whose capture would be a step towards a link up with Italian East Africa. Mussolini had 200,000 troops in Libya, compared to 63,000 British Commonwealth soldiers in Egypt. On 13 September 1940 the Italians crossed the border into Egypt, initiating the North African campaign. The RAF and FAA aircraft on Malta were in a perfect position to interdict supplies and reinforcements travelling from Italy to Libya. Possession of Malta became pivotal to the outcome of the fighting in both the Mediterranean and North Africa, and the Italians immediately besieged the islands, launching heavy air raids. British supply convoys sailed to Malta from the east (out of Alexandria) and west (from Gibraltar), facing fierce attacks from Italian (and later German) aircraft, due to the proximity of Sicily (and Sardinia for ships approaching from the west). The convoys also had to run the gauntlet of warships and submarines from the Regia Marina. A key mission for Force H was to ensure convoys from the west got through to Malta.

== Operations, Club Runs and Convoys ==
=== Fighting the Regia Marina ===
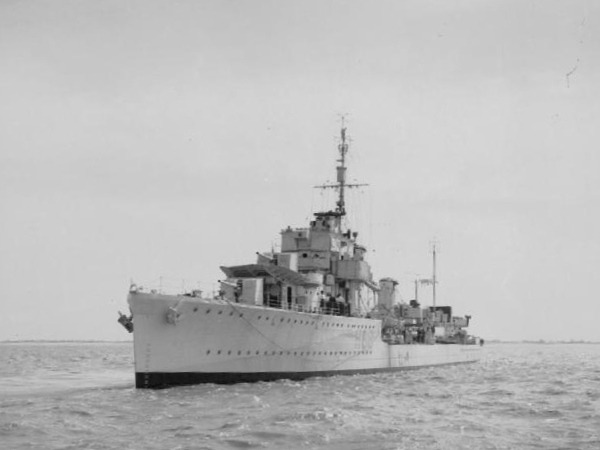
HMS Foresight was a Force H destroyer escort

With the Regia Marina mostly declining battle in line with its fleet in being doctrine, escorting convoys to Malta became the main task, although the fighting that surrounded those convoys frequently escalated to the point they became major naval and air battles in themselves. Ships approaching Malta from the west faced numerous risks. As well as the Regia Marina bases on Sardinia (at Cagliari) and Sicily (Augusta and Messina), MAS boats operated from Pantelleria. An area near the Skerki Banks, called 'the Narrows', was frequently mined and referred to by Allied sailors as 'bomb alley' for its air attacks. There was also the threat from underwater, with 18 Italian submarines based at Cagliari and 22 at the large naval base at Taranto, which were joined by German U-boats from September 1941.

On the night of 11/12 November 1940, Cunningham’s Mediterranean Fleet struck a heavy blow against the Regia Marina in the Battle of Taranto. Fairey Swordfish torpedo bombers launched from the carrier HMS Illustrious attacked the Italian base, disabling three battleships and damaging a heavy cruiser. In Gibraltar, Somerville was concerned that the Italians may now try to even the numbers out via a surprise attack on Force H in the western Mediterranean. In late November, that fear became a reality when, while Force H escorted a convoy past Sardinia, scout aircraft from Ark Royal spotted two squadrons of Italian ships approaching, which included two battleships, six cruisers and several destroyers. Fortunately, Force H was close to a rendezvous with another Royal Navy squadron, including the World War I-era battleship, HMS Ramillies. This meant Somerville had a combined force of roughly equivalent strength to the approaching Italians. Force H enjoyed the advantage of an aircraft carrier, although Ark Royal had recently seen many of its veteran airmen replaced with inexperienced flyers. The Regia Marina force had advantages too, as it included the new battleship Vittorio Veneto, and the Italian cruisers had 8-inch guns whereas four of the five British cruisers had 6-inch guns. Having detached ships to continue escorting the convoy to Malta, Somerville moved to engage the Italians in the Battle of Cape Spartivento.

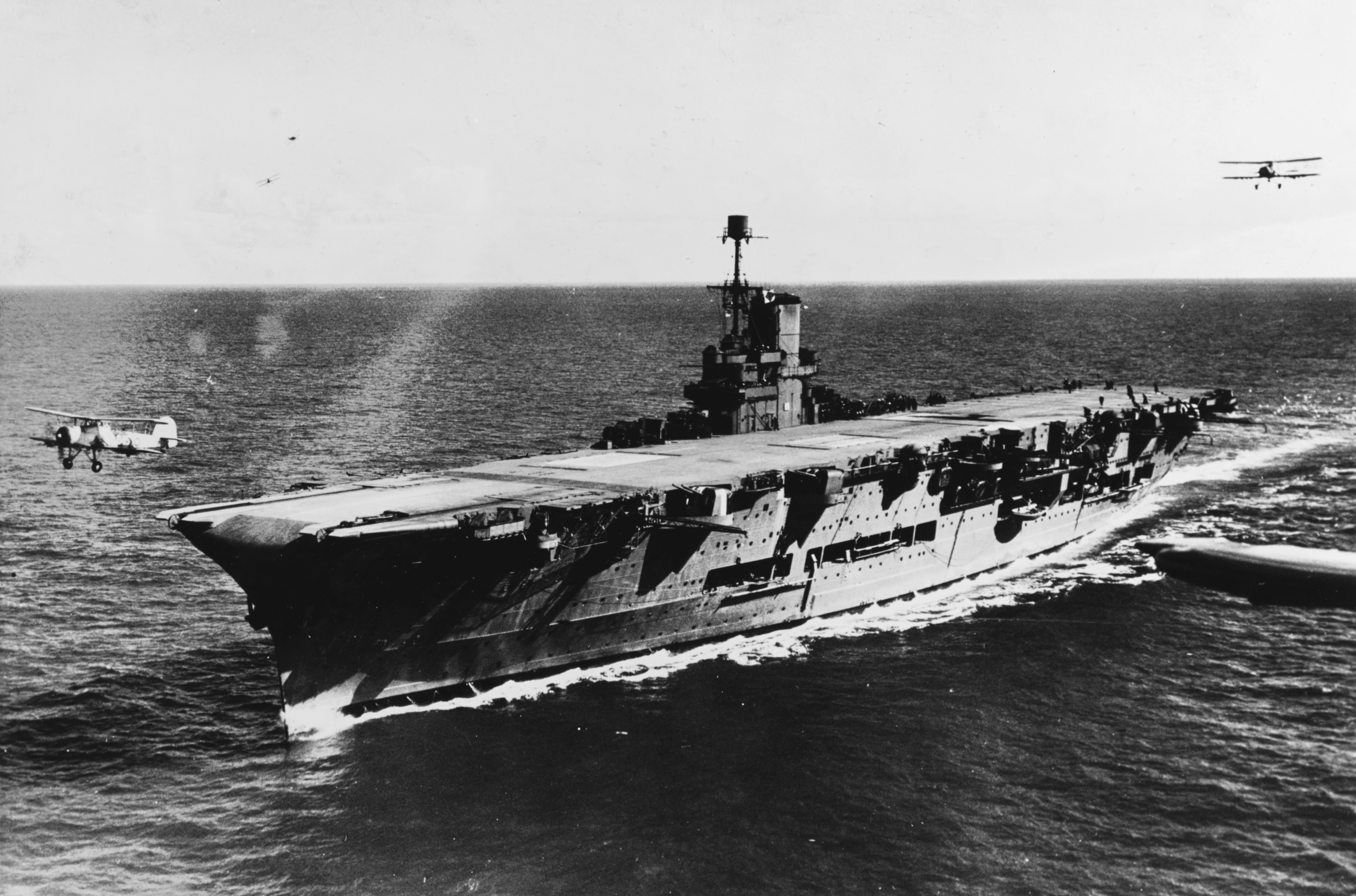
A Swordfish bomber takes off from Ark Royal

The Italian commander, Admiral Inigo Campioni, on realising that he did not have the numerical advantage over the British initially hoped for, ordered his fleet to disengage and retire, with the British and Italian ships exchanging fire at long range. This was in accordance with the Regia Marina's fleet in being doctrine, that advised giving battle only in a situation of clear advantage. With the enemy withdrawing, in order to inflict casualties Somerville looked to his aircraft carrier, but torpedo bombers launched from Ark Royal achieved no hits. A later attack by Italian ground-based bombers on the Royal Navy ships was unsuccessful. Force H's first major battle against the Italians had been inconclusive, with neither side losing any ships, although Somerville was credited with having achieved a strategic victory, as the convoy Force H was escorting reached Malta, then proceeded safely to Alexandria.

=== Club Runs ===
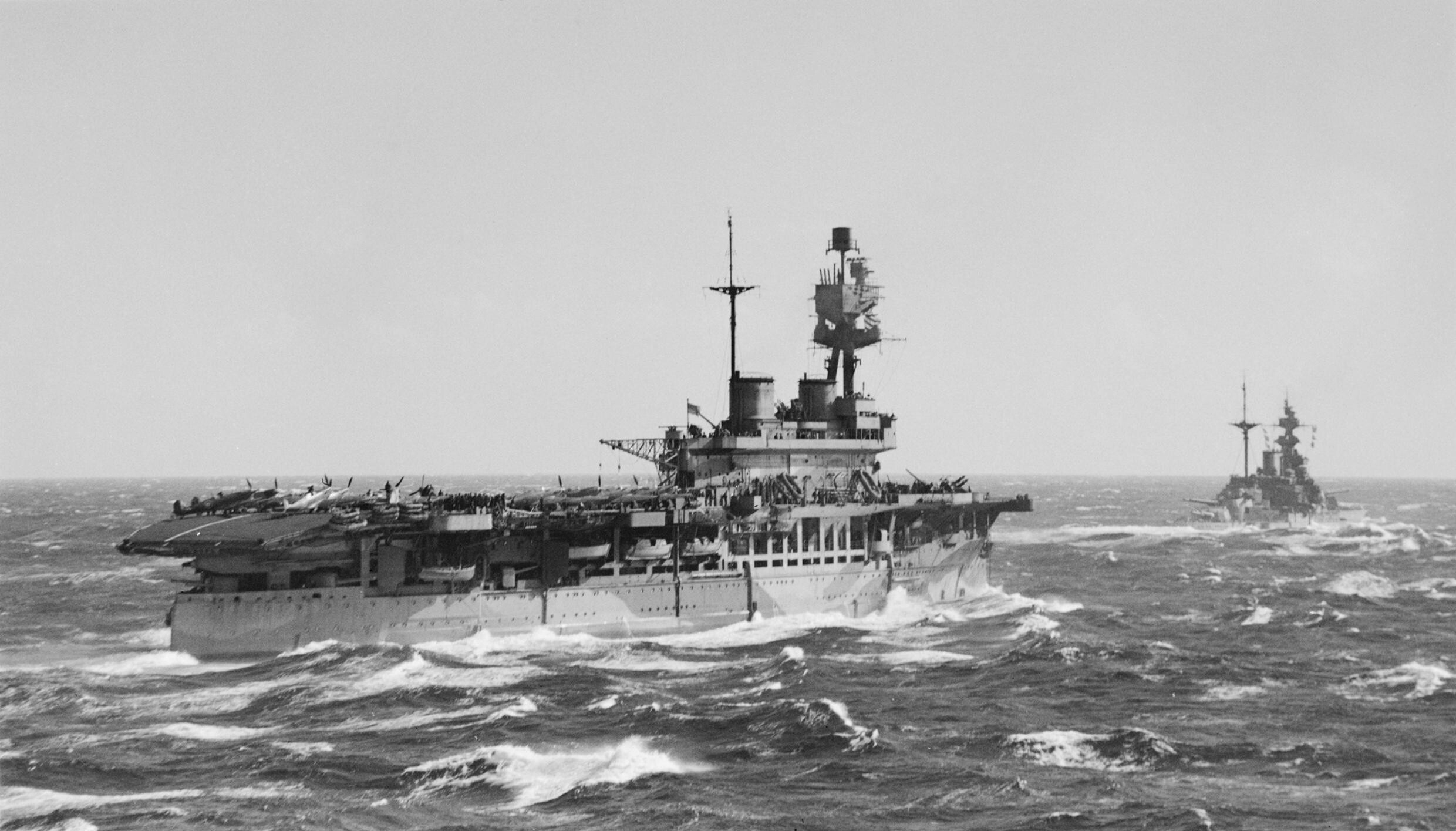
HMS Eagle ferries 16 Spitfire fighters (visible on the flight deck) on a Club Run to Malta, 7 March 1942. The battleship in the background is HMS Malaya

A vital duty carried out by Force H was the 'Club Run' mission, where aircraft were ferried to Malta. The RAF and FAA squadrons operating from Malta suffered a high rate of aircraft attrition due to the heavy and constant Axis air raids. Club Runs provided a regular supply of replacement aircraft. The early Club Runs typically saw an aircraft carrier leave Gibraltar with escorts and sail to a point south west of Sardinia. The aircraft bound for Malta were then launched and flew the rest of the journey massed in an aerial convoy. For the first leg, they were guided by FAA fighters from the aircraft carrier up to a rendezvous point, where they met long range aeroplanes from Malta (usually bombers). These took over as guides, allowing the FAA fighters to return to their carrier. The final leg to Malta was particularly dangerous, due to the proximity of Axis airfields on Sicily and Pantelleria. The approach to Club Runs varied over time, sometimes with long-range search aircraft, like the Short Sunderland, acting as guides.

Force H carried out 17 Club Runs, delivering 331 Hawker Hurricanes, 31 Supermarine Spitfires and 37 FAA aircraft (such as Fairey Albacores and Fairey Fulmars) to Malta. A total of 22 aircraft were lost during transit, mostly due to engine failure or running out of fuel. Some had to turn back to the aircraft carrier, which for those aeroplanes without tailhooks meant a difficult landing. Axis agents monitored the departure of ships from Gibraltar, giving forewarning that Club Runs were on their way, increasing the dangers surrounding these missions. Use of drop tanks allowed aeroplanes to launch from the carriers further from Malta in later operations. Ark Royal was the workhorse of the Club Runs, but several other carriers were involved, particularly Argus and Eagle.

=== The Luftwaffe arrives and the raid on Genoa ===
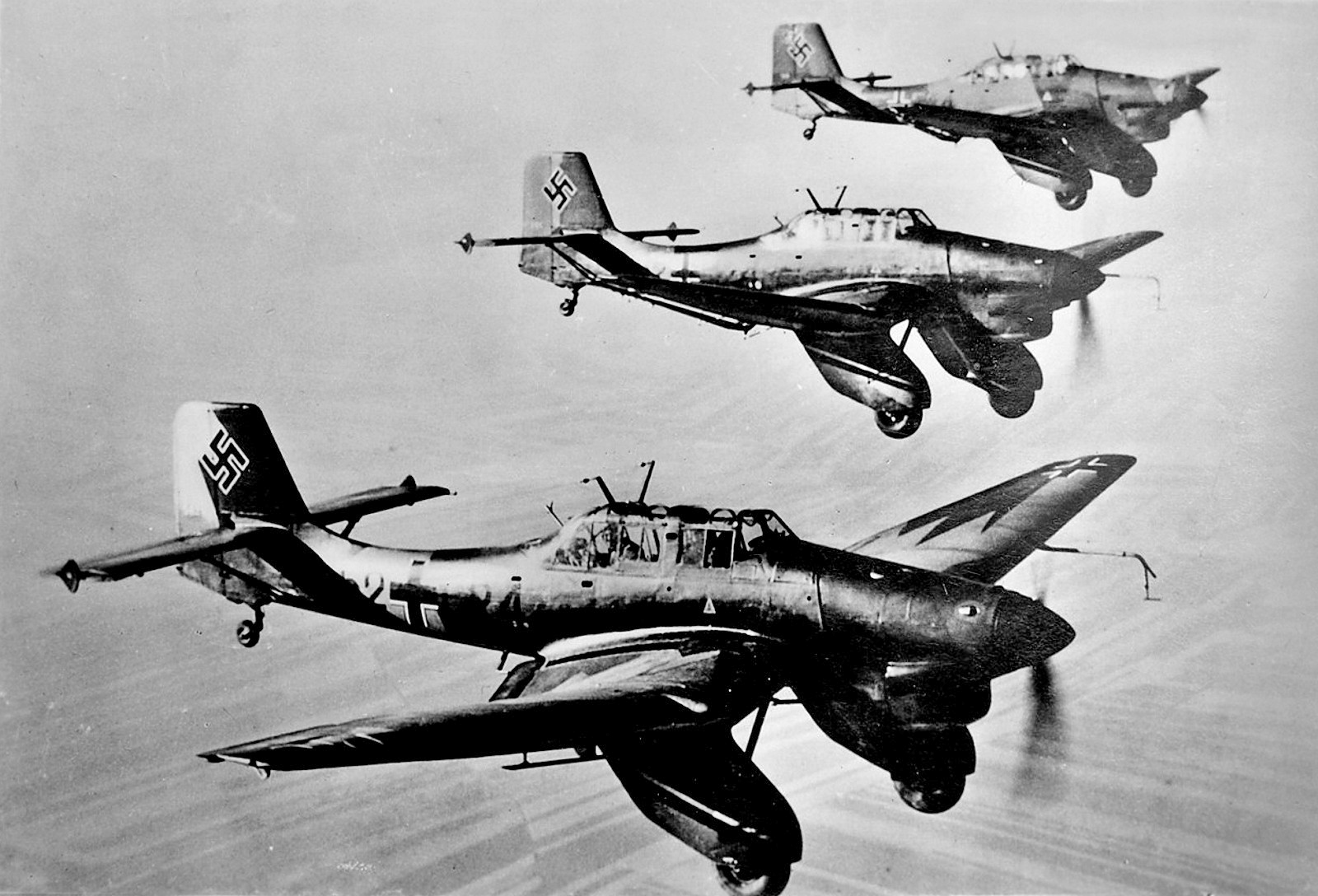
Formation of Ju 87 dive bombers, commonly referred to as 'Stukas'

During the winter of 1940-1941, severe battlefield reverses for the Italians in Greece and North Africa, such as Operation Compass, persuaded Hitler to intervene in the war in the Mediterranean. Early 1941 saw the arrival of the Luftwaffe's X Fliegerkorps in Sicily, whose airmen were specially trained in anti-shipping tactics. This strong force's deployment, with its Junkers Ju 87 and Ju 88 bombers, coincided with the Royal Navy's Operation Excess on 10-11 January. This was a complex mission in which Force H escorted a convoy to the Skerki Banks to be met by part of the Mediterranean Fleet (including the fleet carrier Illustrious), which then guided the convoy to Malta then eastwards where some ships continued to Alexandria and others to Greece. X Fliegerkorps inflicted extensive damage on Illustrious, which was saved from destruction by its armoured flight deck. Also, the light cruiser HMS Southampton was badly damaged and had to be scuttled. The mauled Illustrious reached the Maltese port of Valletta, prompting heavy bombing of the harbour while it underwent repairs.

Somerville devised a plan to take the Royal Navy back on the offensive, Operation Grog, a Force H equivalent in dare and audacity to Cunningham's attack on Taranto. Intelligence suggested two battleships were being repaired in drydocks in Genoa harbour (there was in fact just one, the World War I-era battleship, Duilio). On 9 February, Force H, sailed from Gibraltar to the Gulf of Genoa without incident, then shelled Genoa harbour from ten miles out to sea for half an hour with aircraft spotting the fall of shells. As they departed, the British ships were attacked unsuccessfully by Italian bombers. Meanwhile, aircraft from Ark Royal bombed an oil refinery at Livorno and dropped magnetic mines in La Spezia harbour. The Italian fleet, which was at sea near Corsica, was frustrated in its attempts to intercept Force H by poor visibility. Also, a group of ships pursued by the Italians believing them to be Force H turned out to be a Vichy French convoy. The military and economic impact of the bombardment was not great, as the shells missed Duilio and just a few merchant ships were damaged. However, the psychological impact was significant, boosting British morale and leaving the Italian public with more bad news to contemplate following a run of recent military defeats.

=== The Sinking of the Bismarck ===
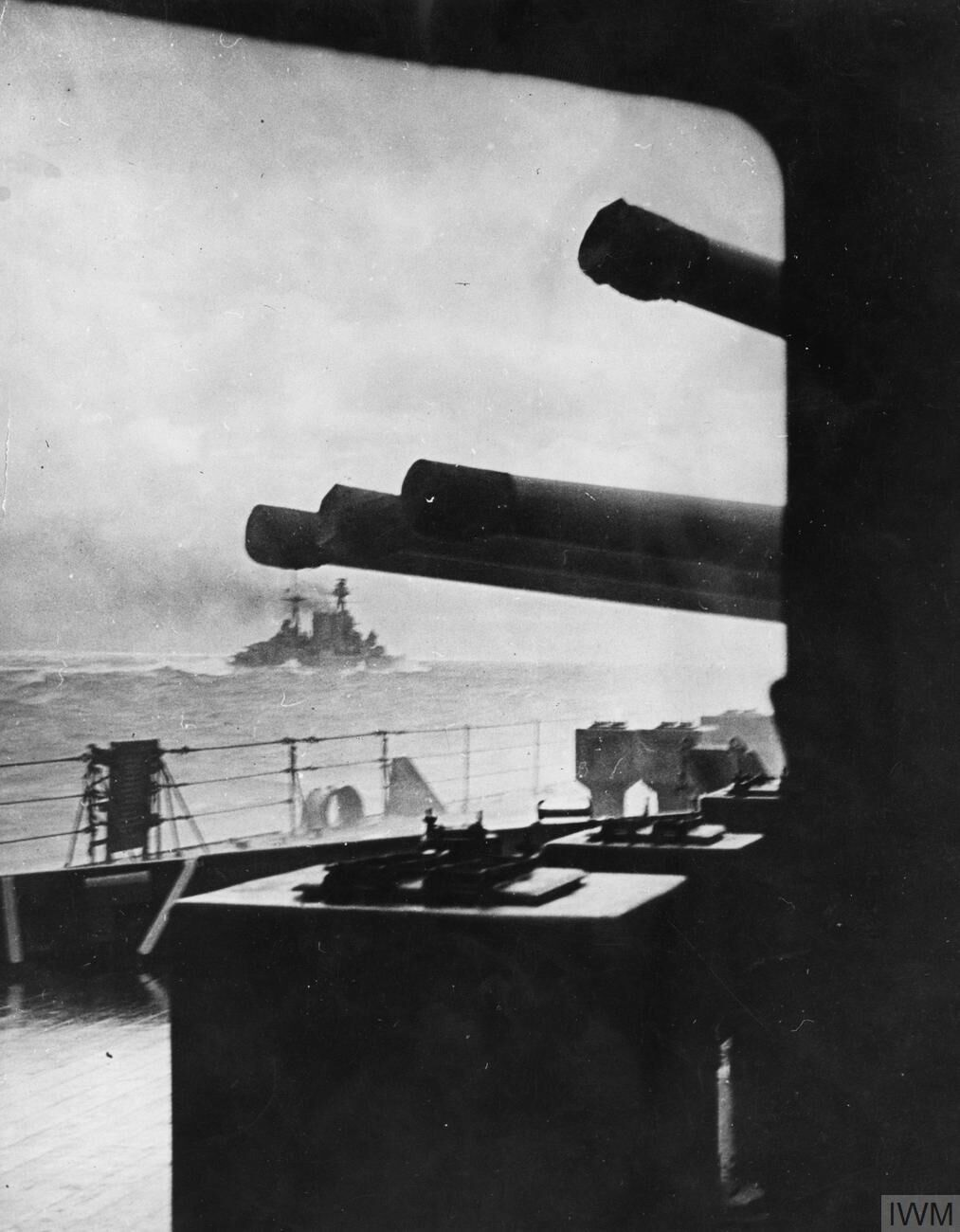
The last picture of HMS Hood before its destruction. The four guns in the foreground are those of HMS Prince of Wales's 'A' turret.

Pursuing German surface raiders in the Atlantic was an integral part of Force H’s role. In November 1940, Renown along with several destroyers entered the Atlantic to counter the threat of the pocket battleship, Admiral Scheer. Christmas Day 1940 saw Force H sail from Gibraltar in search of the heavy cruiser Admiral Hipper.

The most famous Atlantic mission against a German surface raider involving Force H came in May 1941 when the battleship Bismarck sailed in the company with the heavy cruiser Prinz Eugen to attack commercial shipping. She went far to the north of the UK, passing through the Denmark Strait between Iceland and Greenland. There, she was intercepted by a British force made up of the battleship HMS Prince of Wales and the Hood. The engagement was a disaster for the Royal Navy; Prince of Wales was damaged and Hood's magazine exploded, breaking the ship in half. Only three out of 1,418 crew aboard were rescued from the sinking. Every Royal Navy unit available was then given the task of destroying Bismarck.

Course of Bismarck and the ships that pursued her

Force H set sail from Gibraltar to intercept Bismarck with Ark Royal, Renown and the light cruiser Sheffield. Bismarck had not come out of the Denmark Strait engagement completely unscathed: a shell from Prince of Wales had ruptured the ship's fuel tanks, causing her to lose oil. Prinz Eugen and Bismarck parted company, with the former continuing its Atlantic raid while the latter sailed for the French port of Brest for repairs. Bismarck was temporarily lost to the Royal Navy after she evaded the radar of the shadowing cruisers HMS Suffolk and HMS Norfolk. The German battleship was found again, but the only way of catching up with Bismarck was to slow it down. To achieve this, Ark Royal launched a strike with her torpedo bombers. However, the aircrews were wrongly informed of the location of Sheffield and attacked her by mistake. Fortunately, the torpedoes dropped either exploded prematurely due to faulty detonators or were dodged by Sheffield. A second air strike was more successful, and Bismarck was found and a torpedo jammed her steering gear. Unable to evade the British ships closing in, the German battleship was scuttled following incapacitating battle damage dealt by a force including the battleships HMS King George V and the Rodney.

=== Operations Tiger, Substance and Halberd ===
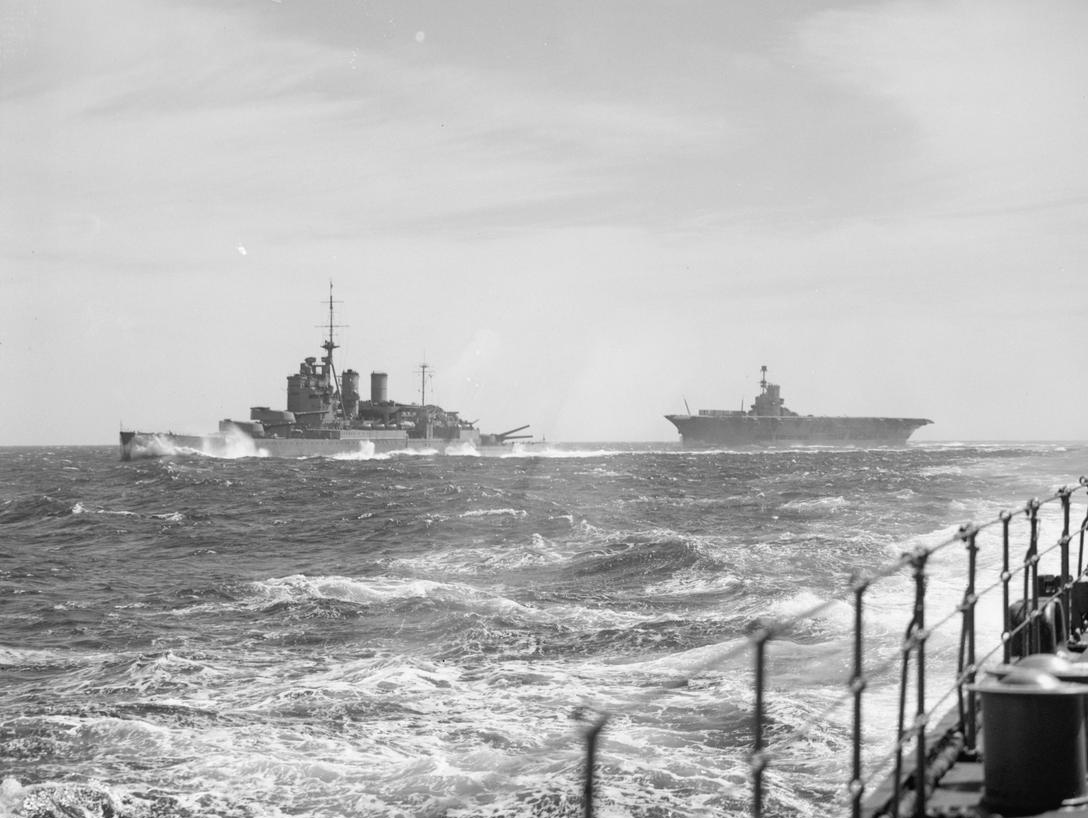
HMS Renown and HMS Ark Royal while serving in Force H. Photo taken from HMS Sheffield

In spring 1941, the situation began to move against the British in Libya, where an offensive by General Erwin Rommel's Afrika Korps and the Italian army had brought Cyrenaica with its strategic airfields back under Axis control. This made approaching Malta by sea from the east more difficult - a situation that would worsen in July with the fall of Crete - which tightened the Axis noose around Malta. After the losses of Operation Excess, the Royal Navy decided that convoys would only run directly from Gibraltar to Alexandria past Malta in urgent circumstances, such as Operation Tiger in early May 1941, which hurried tanks to Egypt as the British army there rebuilt in the aftermath of Rommel's offensive. Royal navy warships at times carried troops and small amounts of supplies to Malta, and submarines sometimes carried in petrol, but both initiatives could only supplement not replace the convoys.

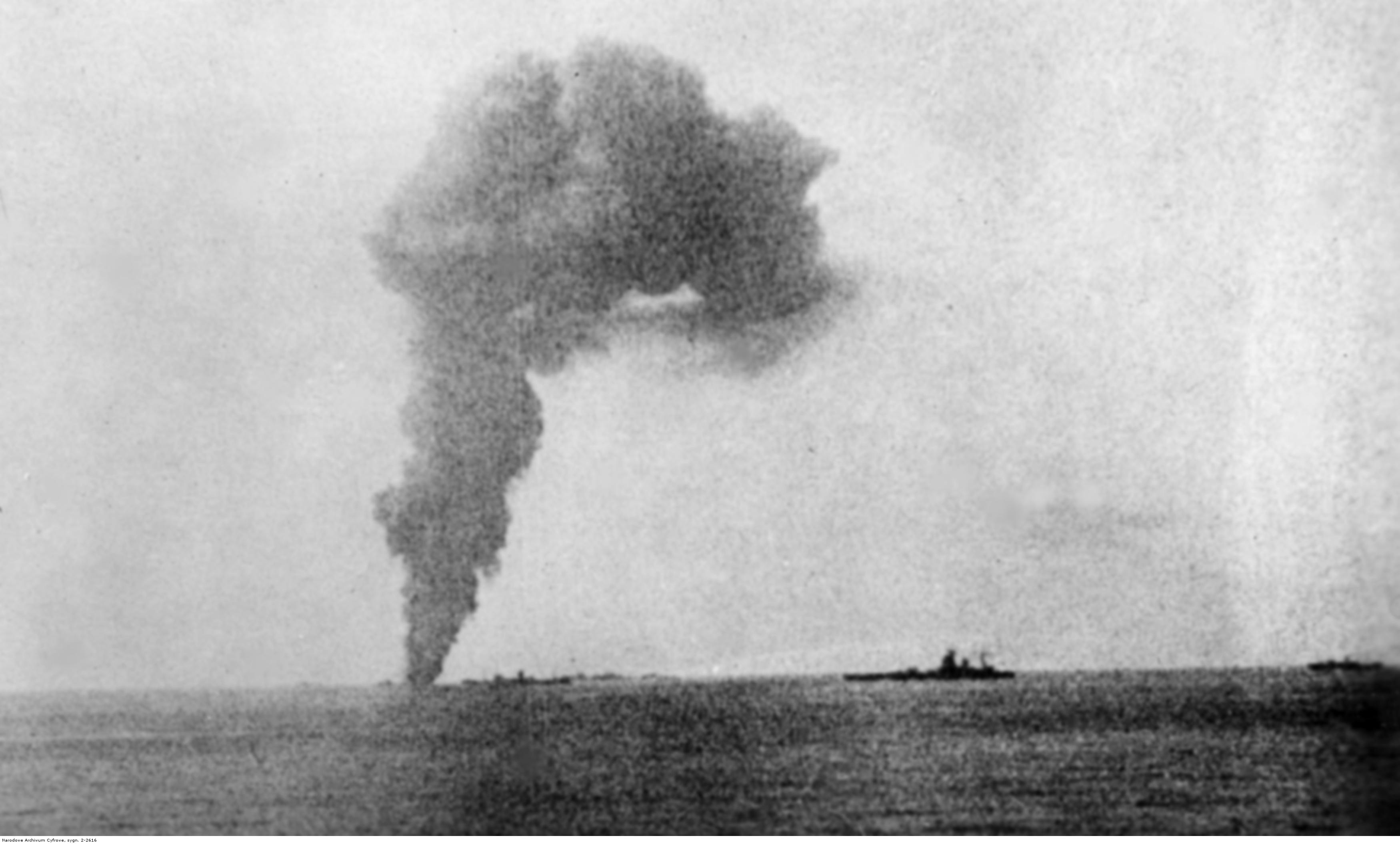
This photo may have been taken during Operation Substance, with the battleship in the foreground possibly HMS Nelson

The fighting surrounding Malta-bound convoys intensified, as shown by Operation Substance in late July 1941. Force H escorted the convoy, accompanied by Force X (a Royal Navy squadron of three cruisers and a minelaying cruiser, with escorting destroyers, and not to be confused with the aforementioned French Force X) which had guarded the merchant ships from Britain to Gibraltar. On reaching the Skerki Banks, Force H would return to Gibraltar while Force X continued with the convoy to Malta. Although X Fliegerkorps had been redeployed to Greece, Operation Substance faced intense air attack from the Regia Aeronautica and MAS boats. Of the Force X ships, the cruiser HMS Manchester and the destroyer HMS Firedrake were badly damaged and had to return to Gibraltar (the latter under tow), while another destroyer, HMS Fearless, was sunk. Ark Royal lost six Fulmar fighters in aerial combat. One of the merchant ships was torpedoed by an MAS boat. The remaining five cargo ships arrived in Malta, making Operation Substance a successful if costly mission.

In September 1941, the largest Malta convoy so far sailed from Gibraltar in Operation Halberd. Given the risk such a large target would draw out the Italian fleet, Somerville was given substantial reinforcements. The modern battleship Prince of Wales joined Force H for the operation, and Rodney, bringing together both the Nelson-class battleships in the same operation. This took Force H's ships on Halberd to: one aircraft carrier (Ark Royal), three battleships and nine destroyers (including two Polish and one Dutch destroyers). Force H would again be joined by Force X, this time consisting of five cruisers and nine destroyers. Again, the Italian fleet declined battle, but the convoy faced repeated air attacks. The convoy reached Malta with just one merchant ship lost, while Nelson was damaged by a torpedo. An Italian submarine, the Adua, was sunk by Force H destroyers.

== Axis fightback and the loss of Ark Royal ==
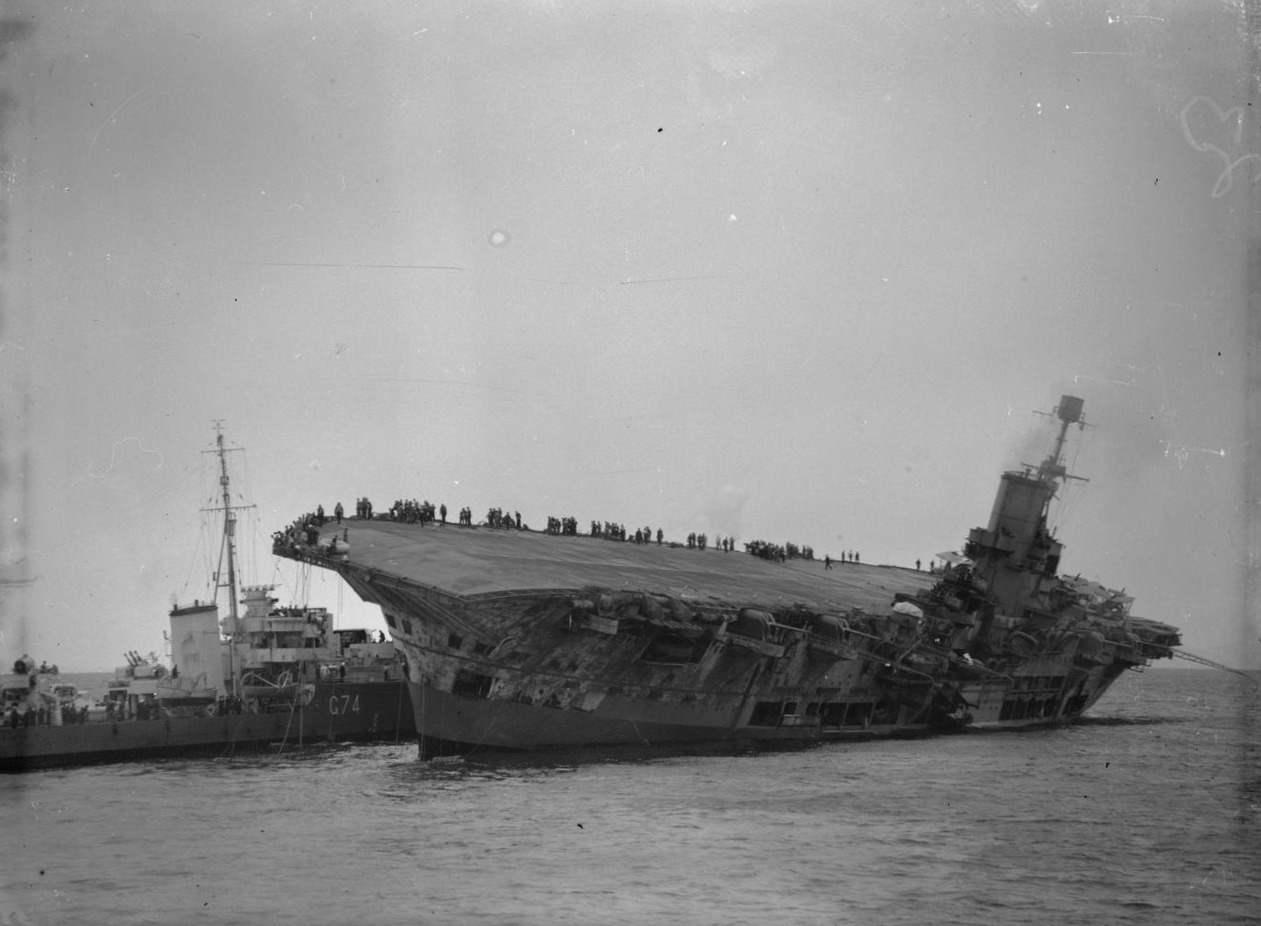
HMS Ark Royal sinking, November 1941. The destroyer, HMS Legion, is alongside

Late 1941 saw a sharp reversal of fortunes for the Royal Navy. In the western Mediterranean, Ark Royal, while returning from a Club Run, was sunk by U-81 on 14 November, a major blow for Force H. In the eastern Mediterranean, Cunningham's fleet suffered the loss of the veteran battleship Barham, which was sunk off Crete by U-331 on 24 November, while two more older battleships (HMS Queen Elizabeth and Valiant) were put out of action on 19 December by the audacious and successful Italian raid on Alexandria using frogmen and human torpedoes.

Japan declaring war in December 1941 heaped fresh demands upon the Royal Navy and further strain on its already stretched resources. More ships and personnel were needed to fight in the Indian and Pacific Oceans, while major losses like the sinking on 10 December 1941 of the battleship Prince of Wales and the battlecruiser HMS Repulse in the South China Sea were a blow to morale across the Royal Navy.

After the loss of Ark Royal, Force H would for the time being have to rely on the elderly aircraft carriers Argus and Eagle. According to Playfair, the Royal Navy finished 1941 with "a seriously reduced fleet" in the Mediterranean which had lost its "hard core". As 1942 began, the Axis air offensive against Malta was intensified creating an urgent need for more (and better quality) aircraft to replace the RAF and FAA’s losses on the islands; plus fuel and other supplies. This meant more Club Runs and convoys. To this turbulent backdrop, Force H was about to see a change of leadership, followed by a major reassignment of its ships that would see the squadron briefly cease to exist.

== Change of command and later operations ==
In late 1941, Somerville wrote to the Admiralty requesting a new command, and in January 1942 he was appointed commander-in-chief of the Eastern Fleet and was replaced at Force H by Vice-Admiral Neville Syfret. However, Syfret was then given command of Force F, the naval task force for Operation Ironclad, the Allied invasion of Madagascar, a Vichy French colony in the Indian Ocean. It was feared the Japanese might invade Magascar, and use it as a base to interdict Allied shipping bound for Egypt and India; so the British launched their own pre-emptive invasion. Most of Force H's ships joined Force F, which left Gibraltar in April 1942. Force H (which from April was effectively dormant) was temporarily replaced at Gibraltar by Force W; a mix of Royal Navy and United States Navy ships, including the aircraft carrier, USS Wasp. In contrast to Force H's independent status, Force W reported to the Flag Officer Commanding, North Atlantic, at Gibraltar.

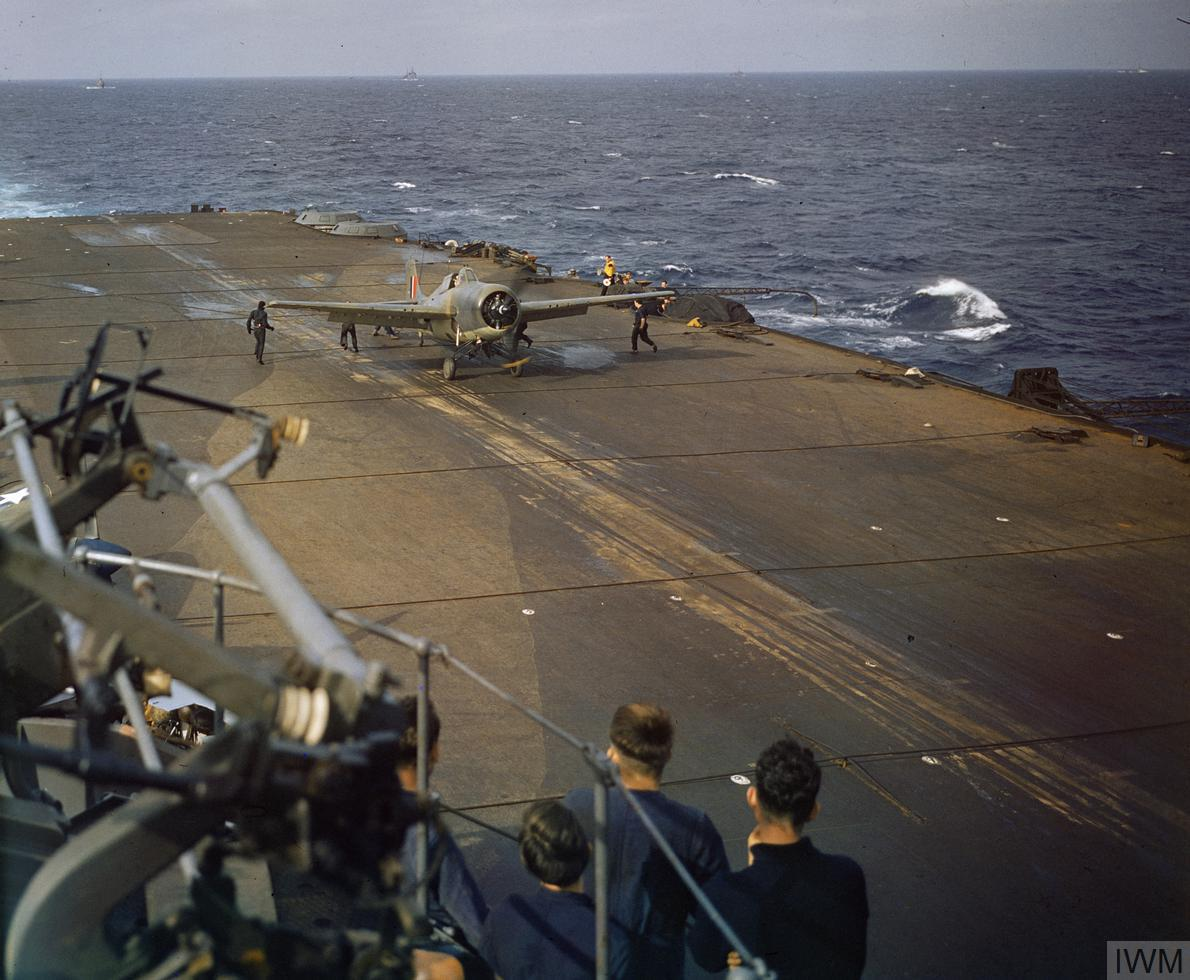
Flight deck of HMS Formidable in 1942. The aircraft carrier was part of Force H during Operation Torch

Following the successful amphibious landings in Madagascar in May 1942, the Admiralty planned to revive Force H at Gibraltar under Syfret's leadership. However, in the face of an increasingly desperate situation in Malta, this was delayed while Syfret took command in Operation Pedestal in August, an epic battle to escort a vital convoy to Malta. During the operation, the Royal Navy lost the carrier Eagle, along with two light cruisers and a destroyer, while the modern fleet carrier HMS Indomitable was damaged. Of the 14 merchant ships in the convoy, nine were sunk. Despite the heavy losses, enough supplies reached Valletta to save Malta, and Pedestal marked a turning point in the Battle of the Mediterranean in favour of the Allies. This was followed by a turning point in the war on land in North Africa, with the major Allied victory in the Second Battle of El Alamein (23 October-4 November 1942). Force H, which had been reconstituted in October, then participated in Operation Torch (8-16 November), providing naval cover for an amphibious landing of British and American troops in the Vichy French possessions of Morocco and Algeria, opening a second front in the North African Campaign.

With the surrender of the Axis forces in Tunisia in May 1943, the way was open for an Allied invasion of Italy. Force H, by then under the command of Vice-Admiral Algernon Willis, provided naval cover for two amphibious assaults on Italy: Operation Husky in July 1943, the invasion of Sicily, and Operation Avalanche in September, a landing on the Italian mainland at Salerno. By autumn 1943, the bulk of the Italian surface fleet was interned at Malta, leaving the Allies dominating the Mediterranean, so some Royal Navy capital ships could be released for service in other theatres. Following the successful conclusion of Avalanche, Force H dispersed and its command was disbanded in October, with Willis becoming Commander-in-Chief, Levant.

== Major battles and operations of Force H ==
- Attack on Mers-el-Kébir – 3 July 1940
- Battle of Cape Spartivento – 27 November 1940
- Operation Collar – November 1940
- Operation Excess – January 1941
- Operation Grog – 9 February 1941
- Sinking of the Bismarck – 26-28 May 1941
- Operation Substance – July 1941
- Operation Halberd – September 1941
- Operation Torch – November 1942
- Operation Husky – July 1943
- Operation Avalanche – September 1943

== See also ==
- Arctic convoys of World War II
- Battle of the Atlantic
- Battle of Cape Matapan
- Convoy HG 76
- Military history of Gibraltar during World War II
- Operation Dragoon
- Scuttling of the French fleet at Toulon
- Second Battle of Sirte

== Bibliography ==
- Dannreuther, Raymond (2005). Somerville's Force H: The Royal Navy's Gibraltar-based Fleet, June 1940 to March 1942. London: Aurum Press. ISBN 1845130200.
- Keegan, John (1989). The Second World War. London: Pimlico. ISBN 9780712673488.
- Konstam, Angus (2016). River Plate, 1939: The Sinking of the Graf Spee. Oxford: Osprey Publishing. ISBN 9781472817976.
- Konstam, Angus (2025). Royal Navy Force H, 1940-42: Britain's strike force at Gibraltar. Oxford: Osprey Publishing. ISBN 9781472870957.
- MacIntyre, Donald (1971). Fighting Admiral: The life of Admiral of the Fleet Sir James Somerville, GCB, GBE, DSO. Ilkley: Sapere Books. ISBN 9780854954865.
- Noppen, Ryan K (2024). Mers-el-Kébir 1940: Operation Catapult. Oxford: Osprey Publishing. ISBN 9781472859716.
- Playfair, I.S.O. (1960). The Mediterranean and Middle East, Volume III (September 1941 to September 1942), British fortunes reach their lowest ebb. London: HMSO.
- Taylor, Bruce (2012). The end of glory, war and peace in HMS Hood, 1916-1941. Annapolis, Maryland: Naval Institute Press. ISBN 9781591142355.
