= Anthony Morrow (Royal Navy officer) =

British Royal Navy officer

Commodore Anthony Morrow CVO
- Military career
- Allegiance: United Kingdom
- Branch: Royal Navy
- Service years: 1962–c. 1998
- Rank: Commodore
- Commands: HMY Britannia; HMS Mercury; HMS Active; HMS Lindisfarne
- Awards: Commander of the Royal Victorian Order

Commodore Anthony John Clare Morrow CVO is a retired senior Royal Navy officer. He is best known for being the last commanding officer of the Royal Yacht Britannia.

== Naval career ==
Morrow joined the Royal Navy in 1962. He was given command of several vessels, including HMS Lindisfarne in 1979, HMS Active in 1983, and HMS Mercury, a shore establishment and site of the Royal Navy Signals School in 1988.

In April 1995 Morrow was appointed Flag Officer, Royal Yachts and subsequently took command of the Royal Yacht Britannia. He served as captain during the Handover of Hong Kong in 1997 when the yacht took the Governor of Hong Kong, Chris Patten, and the Prince of Wales to Manila, the Philippines, following the transfer of sovereignty. He would be the yacht's final captain as it was decommissioned on 11 December that year.

In December 1997, following the decommissioning of HMY Britannia, Elizabeth II appointed Morrow a Commander of the Royal Victorian Order in recognition of his services. In March 2023, he was appointed an Extra Equerry to Charles III.
