= Stuart Bonham Carter =

Royal Navy officer

Vice-Admiral Sir Stuart Bonham Carter KCB CVO DSO
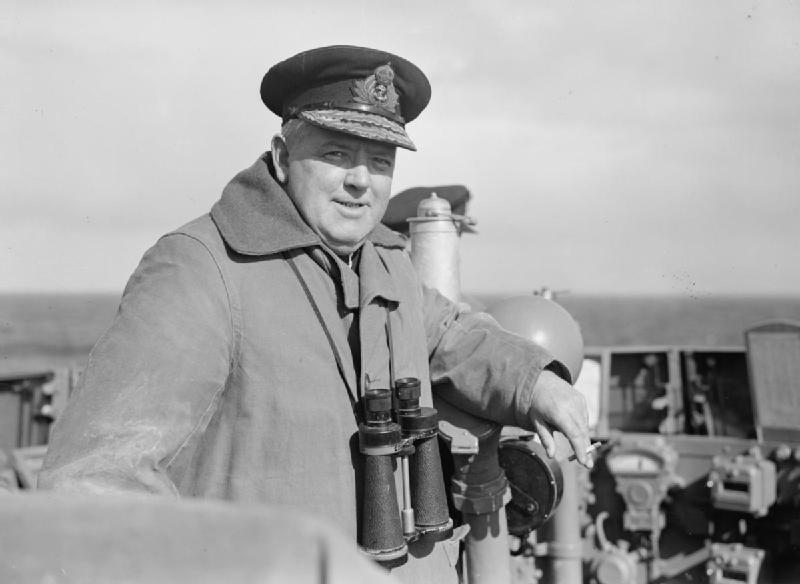
- Vice Admiral Bonham Carter on the bridge of HMS Edinburgh in 1942
- Born: 9 July 1889; Portsmouth, Hampshire
- Died: 5 September 1972 (aged 83); Petersfield, Hampshire
- Military career
- Allegiance: United Kingdom
- Branch: Royal Navy
- Service years: 1904–1945
- Rank: Vice-Admiral
- Commands: Flag Officer, Malta (1942–43); 18th Cruiser Squadron (1942); 3rd Battle Squadron (1940–41); Royal Naval Barracks, Chatham (1937–39); HMS Sussex (1934–37); HMS Calcutta (1929–31); HMS Petersfield (1919–21); HMS Shark (1918–19); HMS Intrepid (1918)
- Conflicts: First World War; Second World War
- Awards: Knight Commander of the Order of the Bath; Commander of the Royal Victorian Order; Distinguished Service Order; Mentioned in Despatches; Legion of Honour (France); Croix de Guerre (France); Silver Medal of Military Valor (Italy); Croix de Guerre (Belgium)

Vice-Admiral Sir Stuart Sumner Bonham Carter, KCB, CVO, DSO (9 July 1889 – 5 September 1972) was an officer in the Royal Navy who served in both the First and Second World Wars.

== Naval career ==
Born into the prominent British Bonham Carter family, as the younger son of Lothian Bonham-Carter and his wife, Emily Maud Sumner. Stuart joined the Royal Navy in 1904. He served in the First World War, commanding the block ship HMS Intrepid during the Zeebrugge Raid in 1918. He also commanded the destroyer HMS Shark in the closing stages of the war.

A keen cricketer, Bonham Carter played two first-class matches for the Royal Navy Cricket Club in 1925. He was appointed Chief of Staff to the Commander-in-Chief, Africa in 1928, and made assistant director of Navy Equipment in 1932 before becoming Chief Staff Officer to the commander of the 1st Cruiser Squadron in 1934. He was given command of the Royal Naval Barracks at Chatham in 1937 and made Naval Secretary in 1939.

Bonham Carter also served in the Second World War, commanding the 3rd Battle Squadron from 1940 and the 18th Cruiser Squadron from 1942.

As the commander of the 18th Cruiser Squadron, he sailed with:

- Convoy PQ 14 (April 1942): He provided ocean escort and close protection, flying his flag on the light cruiser HMS Edinburgh after his earlier flagship HMS Trinidad suffered a freak accident, when one of its own torpedoes circled around and struck the ship.
- Convoy PQ 17 (July 1942): He was deployed on a concurrent supply mission to Spitsbergen during its passage.
- Convoy PQ 18 (September 1942): He commanded the Cruiser Covering Force, which consisted of three heavy cruisers (HMS London, HMS Norfolk, and HMS Suffolk) and their destroyer escorts to shield the convoy from German surface threats.

It is said that he had something of a reputation of being a Jonah in any cruiser in which he raised his Admiral's flag, as these kept being sunk from under his feet. After both Trinidad and Edinburgh had been wrecked while under his flag, this reputation had some justification. Bonham Carter was made Flag Officer, Malta in 1942 and after periodically suffering from depression, insomnia, even to the extent of contemplating suicide, he retired due to ill health in 1943 (to be succeeded by Vice-Admiral Sir Arthur Power); he was duly benefitted by rest and treatment and was eventually recalled in 1944 to lead naval convoys. It was perhaps unfortunate that a toxic atmosphere existed between Lord Gort (Malta Governor) and RAF's Sir Keith Park; Gort never forgave the RAF for what he perceived as their negligence in providing adequate air cover for troops departing Dunkirk and, given Park's leading role in that battle, this bias was deeply personal and ultimately became quite unhealthy. There was also a sharp divide in how both saw the RAF's function with Gort favouring pure defence while Park pursued offence against Rommel's supply lines as well as maintaining an aggressive defence. Bonham Carter was somewhat caught between two strong characters and the constant tension and conflict could not have helped his mental state.

== Family ==
In 1933 Bonham Carter married Eve Lloyd; they had one child, Joanna. He is distantly related to the actress Helena Bonham Carter.

There is a memorial to Bonham Carter at St Mary's Church, Buriton.

== See also ==
- Bonham Carter family

Military offices
Preceded by William Whitworth	Naval Secretary; May – November 1939	Succeeded by Neville Syfret
Preceded by Sir Ralph Leatham	Flag Officer, Malta; 1942–1943	Succeeded by Sir Arthur Power
