= Harold Burrough =

Royal Navy Admiral (1889–1977)

Admiral Sir Harold Burrough GCB KBE DSO
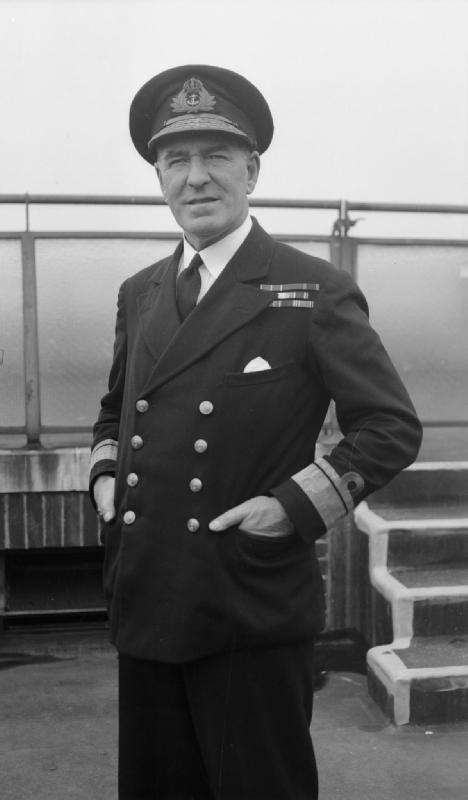
- Born: 4 July 1889
- Died: 22 October 1977 (aged 88)
- Military career
- Allegiance: United Kingdom
- Branch: Royal Navy
- Service years: 1903–1949
- Rank: Admiral
- Commands: HMS London; Nore Command
- Conflicts: World War I World War II
- Awards: Knight Grand Cross of the Order of the Bath; Knight Commander of the Order of the British Empire; Distinguished Service Order

Admiral Sir Harold Martin Burrough, GCB, KBE, DSO (4 July 1889 – 22 October 1977) was a senior Royal Navy officer and Assistant Chief of Naval Staff to the Royal Navy during World War II.

== Early career ==
Born the tenth son of Rev. Charles Burrough and his wife Georgina Long, Burrough began his career as a naval cadet in 1903 after being educated at St Edward's School, Oxford. He first saw action during World War I as a gunnery officer aboard HMS Southampton, later taking part in the Battle of Jutland in 1916. In 1930 he was given command of HMS London. He was made Commander of the 5th Destroyer Flotilla in 1935 and of HMS Excellent in 1937. He was made Assistant Chief of the Naval Staff in 1939.

== World War II ==
In September 1940 he was appointed Rear-Admiral Commanding 10th Cruiser Squadron. During the Second World War he was awarded the DSO after Operation Archery a raid on the Norwegian islands of Vågsøy and Måløy on 27 December 1941 in which nine enemy ships were sunk by the Navy and Royal Air Force and the garrisons were wiped out by the raiding force. Burrough would serve on the Naval Staff for two years until 1942. In July of that year he was given command of the close escort force for Operation Pedestal, and subsequently placed in command of Allied naval forces in the assault on Algiers during Operation Torch, as well as directing the Northwest Africa landings.

After becoming Flag Officer Commanding Gibraltar and Mediterranean Approaches in September 1943, Burrough succeeded Admiral Sir Bertram Ramsay as Allied Naval Commander-in-Chief, Expeditionary Force (ANXF), following Ramsay's death after an aircraft accident in January 1945. Planning the Allied naval strategy and operations, working closely with U.S. General Dwight D. Eisenhower during the final years of the war, Burrough was one of the signatories to the German Surrender Documents on 7 May 1945 at Rheims, France.

He remained as naval commander occupying post-war Germany, where among his duties he authorised the formation of the German Mine Sweeping Administration. He then became Commander-in-Chief, The Nore in 1946. He retired in 1949, being created Knight Grand Cross of the order of the Bath (GCB) that year. He died on 22 October 1977 from pneumonia at the Moorhouse Nursing Home, Hindhead, Surrey.

== Family ==
Burrough married in 1914, Nellie Wills, daughter of C.W Outhit of Halifax, Nova Scotia, and had two sons and three daughters. His wife died in 1972.

Military offices
Preceded by Sir Frederick Edward-Collins	Flag Officer Commanding Gibraltar and Mediterranean Approaches; 1943–1945	Succeeded by Post disbanded
Preceded by Sir John Tovey	Commander-in-Chief, The Nore; 1946–1948	Succeeded by Sir Henry Moore
