= Flag Officer, Royal Yachts =

Office of the Flag Officer, Royal Yachts
- Ensign of the Royal Navy
- Admiralty, Ministry of Defence
- Reports to: First Sea Lord and Commander-in-Chief, Fleet
- Nominator: Secretary of State for Defence
- Appointer: Prime Minister; Subject to formal approval by the Queen-in-Council
- Term length: Not fixed (typically 1–4 years)
- Inaugural holder: Vice-Admiral Sir John R.T. Fullerton
- Formation: 1884-1997

The Flag Officer, Royal Yachts, (FORY) also styled Flag Officer Commanding Royal Yachts was a senior Royal Navy post that existed from 1884 to 1997.

== History ==
Royal yachts have been a feature of the monarchy since at least 1660, during this period command of the Royal Yacht was usually held by a captain. The office of Flag Officer, Royal Yachts was established by letters patent on 15 October 1884. Royal Yachts was an independent command, administered personally by the Flag Officer, Royal Yachts. It was standard protocol for the (FORY) to be appointed as an extra equerry to the monarch and, as such, was a member of the royal household. The post existed until 1997 when it was abolished as separate command.

== Duties ==
At various times included:

- Acts as the host at official receptions on behalf of the monarch when the royal yacht visits countries when no member of the royal family is embarked.
- Exercises tactical control over Royal Navy, Commonwealth and foreign warships and Royal Fleet Auxiliary forming the Royal Squadron when the monarch or other members of the royal family are embarked.
- Hosts receptions on behalf of the monarch during sea days or commercial seminars held on board in support of British industry. These events bring FORY into direct and frequent contact with Heads of State and Government, and captains of industry.
- Keeps the First Sea Lord and Commander in Chief, Fleet informed of all plans in relation to HM Royal Yachts programme.
- Responsible for HM Royal Yachts safe and efficient operation at all times. and for the detailed planning of its programme.

Note: Royal Squadron should not be confused with Royal Yacht Squadron.

== Flag officer commanding ==
Post holders included:

- Vice-Admiral Sir John R. T. Fullerton: October 1884-April 1901
- Rear-Admiral the Hon. Hedworth Lambton: April 1901-April 1903 (Cdre Royal Yachts from 1901 to 1902)
- Rear-Admiral Sir Archibald Berkeley Milne, Bt.: April 1903-August 1905
- Rear-Admiral Sir Colin R. Keppel: August 1905-August 1909
- Commodore Norman C. Palmer: August 1909-December 1913
- Commodore Douglas R. L. Nicholson: December 1913-August 1914
- Rear-Admiral the Hon. Sir Hubert G. Brand: May 1919-April 1922
- Admiral Sir Henry T. Buller: April 1922-December 1931
- Admiral the Hon. Sir Herbert Meade Fetherstonhaugh: April 1931-December 1934
- Vice-Admiral Sir Dudley B. N. North: December 1934-September 1939
- Vice-Admiral Sir E. M. Conolly Abel Smith: February 1953-January 1958
- Vice-Admiral Sir Peter Dawnay: January 1958-January 1962
- Rear-Admiral Sir Joseph C.C. Henley: January 1962-March 1965
- Rear-Admiral Sir Patrick J. Morgan: March 1965-August 1970
- Rear-Admiral Sir Richard J. Trowbridge: August 1970-September 1975
- Rear-Admiral Sir Hugh P. Janion: September 1975-February 1981
- Rear-Admiral Sir Paul W. Greening: February 1981-September 1985
- Rear-Admiral Sir John Garnier: September 1985-September 1990
- Rear-Admiral Sir Robert N. Woodard: September 1990-April 1995
- Commodore Anthony J.C. Morrow: April 1995-December 1997

Note: Post holders sometimes styled as Admiral, Vice-Admiral, Rear-Admiral or Commodore Commanding Royal Yachts or HM Yachts

== See also ==
- Royal Yacht Squadron
