= Frederick Edward-Collins =

Royal Navy Admiral (1883–1958)

Admiral Sir Frederick Edward-Collins KCB KCVO ADC DL
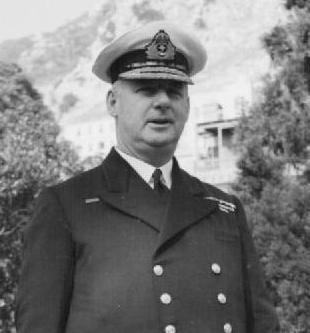
- Edward-Collins as Flag Officer Commanding Gibraltar and Mediterranean Approaches
- Born: George Frederick Basset Edward-Collins; 26 December 1883; Bodmin, Cornwall
- Died: 17 February 1958 (aged 74); Lostwithiel, Cornwall
- Relatives: Major General Charles Edward-Collins (brother)
- Military career
- Allegiance: United Kingdom
- Branch: Royal Navy
- Service years: 1898–1944
- Rank: Admiral
- Commands: 18th Cruiser Squadron; 2nd Cruiser Squadron; HMS Renown; HMS Comus; HMS Carysfort
- Conflicts: Boxer Rebellion; First World War; Second World War
- Awards: Knight Commander of the Order of the Bath; Knight Commander of the Royal Victorian Order; Mentioned in Despatches; Commander of the Legion of Merit (United States); Order of Polonia Restituta, fourth Class (Poland)

Admiral Sir George Frederick Basset Edward-Collins KCB KCVO ADC DL (26 December 1883 – 17 February 1958) was a British senior officer in the Royal Navy during the first half of the twentieth century.

== Early life ==
Edward-Collins was born in Bodmin, Cornwall, the son of Edward Charles Edward-Collins, of Trewardale, Blisland, a local landowner. He was the younger brother of Charles Edward-Collins, who served in both the British and Indian armies and rose to the rank of major general.

== Naval career ==
Edward-Collins enrolled in the navy on 15 January 1898. As a midshipman he was appointed to HMS Goliath on 27 March 1900, on her first commission, to the China station. During the First World War Edward-Collins served on both HMS Superb and HMS Tiger.

Edward-Collins commanded the light cruisers HMS Carysfort from April till September 1925, and HMS Comus from September 1925 till April 1927. He was also captain of the battlecruiser HMS Renown from December 1930 till March 1932, and was appointed Chief of Staff to the Commander-in-Chief of the Mediterranean Fleet on 13 September 1935. From 1938 until 1940 he commanded the 2nd Cruiser Squadron, and later in 1940 he became second in command of the Home Fleet. From June to November 1940 he commanded the 18th Cruiser Squadron. In December 1940 Edward-Collins became Flag Officer Commanding, North Atlantic, at Gibraltar, assuming duties on 1 January 1941. He flew his flag from HMS Cormorant (1877). He was acting Governor of Gibraltar from 08.05.1942 to 19 June 1942. He was promoted to admiral on 21 January 1943, and retired on 7 February 1944.

== Awards and recognition ==
Edward-Collins became Knight Commander of the Royal Victorian Order on 17 June 1939. He was mentioned in dispatches in 1940, and became Knight Commander of the Order of the Bath on 1 January 1941. He was awarded the Order Odrodzenia Polski (4th class) in recognition of services to the Polish Navy on 22 December 1942.

He died on 17 February 1958, at the age of 74.

Military offices
Preceded by Sir Dudley North	Flag Officer Commanding Gibraltar and Mediterranean Approaches; 1940–1943	Succeeded by Sir Harold Burrough
