= Charles Edward-Collins =

British Army general (1881–1967)

Major-General Charles Edward-Collins CB CIE
- Born: Charles Edward Edward-Collins; 28 May 1881; Bodmin, Cornwall, England
- Died: 21 November 1967 (aged 86); Bodmin, Cornwall, England
- Relatives: Admiral Sir Frederick Edward-Collins (brother)
- Military career
- Allegiance: United Kingdom
- Branch: British Army (1900–1909); British Indian Army (1909–1940)
- Service years: 1900–1940
- Rank: Major-General
- Commands: Director of Supplies and Transport, India (1937–1940)
- Conflicts: Second Boer War; Abor Expedition; First World War; Persian Campaign; Second World War
- Awards: Companion of the Order of the Bath; Companion of the Order of the Indian Empire; Mentioned in Despatches (2)
- Other work: High Sheriff of Cornwall (1955)

Major-General Charles Edward Edward-Collins CB CIE (28 May 1881 – 21 November 1967) was a British Indian Army officer.

== Early life and marriage ==
Edward-Collins was born in Bodmin, Cornwall, the son of Edward Charles Edward-Collins, a local landowner, and his wife, Eleanor Mary (née Alms). His younger brother was Frederick Edward-Collins, who became an admiral in the Royal Navy. He was educated at Marlborough College and the Royal Military College, Sandhurst.

In 1907, Edward-Collins married Nora Mabel de la Cour Corbett. They had two sons and three daughters. She died in 1952.

== Career ==
Edward-Collins was commissioned a second lieutenant in the North Staffordshire Regiment in late February 1900, but the appointment was cancelled, and he was instead appointed to the Devonshire Regiment early the following month. He served in the Second Boer War from 1900 to 1902 and was promoted to lieutenant in November 1901. In January 1907, he was seconded to the Indian Army's Supply and Transport Corps (later the Indian Army Service Corps), and transferred permanently in October 1909. He served in the Abor Expedition (against the residents of the Abor Hills) in 1911 to 1912, for which he was mentioned in despatches and promoted to brevet major in June 1912.

He was promoted substantive major in February 1915 and served with the Bushire Field Force in Persia in 1918 to 1919, for which he was again mentioned in despatches and appointed Companion of the Order of the Indian Empire (CIE) in January 1920. In November 1923, he was appointed an assistant director of transport at the Headquarters, Army in India, in which post he served until March 1926. He was promoted brevet lieutenant-colonel in June 1924.

He then served as commandant of the Indian Army Service Corps Training Establishment until May 1930 and in May 1930 was promoted colonel. He served as deputy director of transport at the Headquarters, Army in India until September 1933, when he was appointed deputy director of supplies and transport for the Army in India, serving in the post (with the temporary rank of brigadier) until September 1937. He was appointed Aide-de-Camp (ADC) to the King in September 1935, holding the position until September 1937, and Companion of the Order of the Bath (CB) in the 1937 Coronation Honours of King George VI. He was promoted major-general in September 1937, retired from the Indian Army in September 1940 and returned to his ancestral home at Trewardale, near Blisland. He commanded the North Cornwall Group of the Home Guard from 1942 to 1945 and served as High Sheriff of Cornwall in 1955.

== Bibliography ==
- Smart, Nick (2005). Biographical Dictionary of British Generals of the Second World War. Barnesley: Pen & Sword. ISBN 1844150496.
