= 18th Cruiser Squadron =

Royal Navy military unit

- Active: 1939-1942
- Country: United Kingdom
- Allegiance: British Empire
- Branch: Royal Navy

Commanders
- Notable commanders: Vice-Admiral Geoffrey Layton

The 18th Cruiser Squadron was a formation of cruisers of the Royal Navy from 1939 to 1942. The squadron was formed in September 1939 and was assigned to the Home Fleet until it was disbanded in October 1942. It included HMS Norfolk.

== Commanders ==
Included:

	Rank	Flag	Name	Term	Notes
Commodore/Rear/Vice-Admiral Commanding, 18th Cruiser Squadron
1	Rear-Admiral	Rear-Admiral - Royal Navy	Ronald Hallifax	September – November 1939	
2	Vice-Admiral	Vice-Admiral - Royal Navy	Geoffrey Layton	November 1939 – June 1940	
3	Vice-Admiral	Vice-Admiral - Royal Navy	Sir Frederick Edward-Collins	June – November 1940	
4	Rear-Admiral	Rear-Admiral - Royal Navy	Lancelot Holland	November 1940 – May 1941	VAdm - 01/1941
5	Commodore		Charles M. Blackman	May – June 1941	(temporary)
6	Rear-Admiral	Rear-Admiral - Royal Navy	Edward Syfret	June 1941 – January 1942	
7	Vice-Admiral	Vice-Admiral - Royal Navy	Stuart Bonham Carter	January – October 1942	
