= 13th Destroyer Flotilla =

Thirteen destroyer flotilla

- Active: 1915–1919, 1939–1945
- Country: United Kingdom
- Branch: Royal Navy
- Size: Flotilla

Commanders
- First: Captain James U. Farie

The British 13th Destroyer Flotilla, or Thirteenth Destroyer Flotilla, was a naval formation of the Royal Navy from November 1915 – November 1918 and again from September 1939 to January 1944.

== History ==
=== World War One ===
The flotilla was first formed in November 1915 and was assigned to the Grand Fleet. Between 31 May and 1 June 1916 it was present at the Battle of Jutland as part of the Battle Cruiser Fleet. It remained with the Grand Fleet until November 1918 and was disbanded in March 1919.

=== Second World War ===
In September 1939 the flotilla was re-established and assigned to the North Atlantic Command at Gibraltar. On 29 January 1943 it was operating within the command as part of the Gibraltar Escort Force until 2 July 1943. The flotilla remained in the North Atlantic Command until May 1945 when it was disbanded.

== Operational deployments ==
| Assigned to | Dates | Notes |
|---|---|---|
| Grand Fleet | November 1915 to May 1916 | |
| Battle Cruiser Fleet | May 1916 to June 1916 | |
| Grand Fleet | June 1916 to November 1918 | disbanded |
| North Atlantic Command | September 1939 to May 1945 | Reformed and within Gibraltar Escort Force, convoys till Jul 1943 |

== Administration ==
=== Captains (D) afloat 13th Destroyer Flotilla ===
Incomplete list of post holders included:

| | Rank | Name | Term | Notes |
|---|---|---|---|---|
Captain (D) afloat 13th Destroyer Flotilla
| 1 | Captain | James U. Farie | 25 April 1916 – April, 1917 | later R.Adm. |
| 2 | Captain | Hugh J. Tweedie | April, 1917 – November, 1917 | later Adm. |
| 3 | Captain | Arthur B. S. Dutton | November, 1917 – 8 April 1919 | later V.Adm. |
| 4 | Captain | F. S. de Winton | September 1939 | onboard leader HMS Keppel |

== Sources ==
- Bertke, Donald A.; Smith, Gordon; Kindell, Don (2011). WORLD WAR TWO SEA WAR. Morrisville, NC, USA: Lulu. ISBN 9780578029412.
- Harley, Simon; Lovell, Tony. (2018) "Thirteenth Destroyer Flotilla (Royal Navy) - The Dreadnought Project". www.dreadnoughtproject.org. Harley and Lovell, 29 May 2018. Retrieved 9 July 2018.
- Hewitt, Geoff (2008). Hitler's Armada: The German Invasion Plan, and the Defence of Great Britain by the Royal Navy, April–October 1940. Barnsley, England: Pen & Sword Maritime. ISBN 9781844157853.
- Watson, Dr Graham. (2015) Royal Navy Organisation and Ship Deployments 1900-1914". www.naval-history.net. G. Smith.
- Watson, Dr Graham. (2015) "Royal Navy Organisation and Ship Deployment, Inter-War Years 1919-1938". www.naval-history.net. Gordon Smith.
- Watson, Dr Graham. (2015) "Royal Navy Organisation in World War 2, 1939-1945". www.naval-history.net. Gordon Smith.
