= Royal Squadron (Royal Navy) =

- Country: United Kingdom
- Allegiance: British Empire
- Branch: Royal Navy

Commanders
- Notable commanders: Admiral of the Fleet, George Anson

The Royal Squadron originally known as the Royal Flotilla was an ad hoc naval formation of the British Royal Navy assembled for official visits and travel by sea by the British monarch.

== History ==
The Royal Squadron originally known as the Royal Flotilla was an ad hoc naval squadron formed when the Monarch or other members of the royal family are embarked on any travel by sea for official visits. From 1660 until 1884 the squadron/flotilla when assembled was commanded by officers of various rank from Captain of the Fleet to Admiral of the Fleet. From the end of the nineteenth century until the late twentieth century the Flag Officer, Royal Yachts was responsible for command of the squadron when one is formed. He temporarily exercised tactical control over Royal Navy, Commonwealth and foreign warships and Royal Fleet Auxiliary that formed the Royal Squadron.

== See also ==
- Royal Yacht Squadron
