= Norman Wodehouse =

Royal Navy admiral and rugby union player (1887-1941)

Vice-Admiral Norman Wodehouse CB
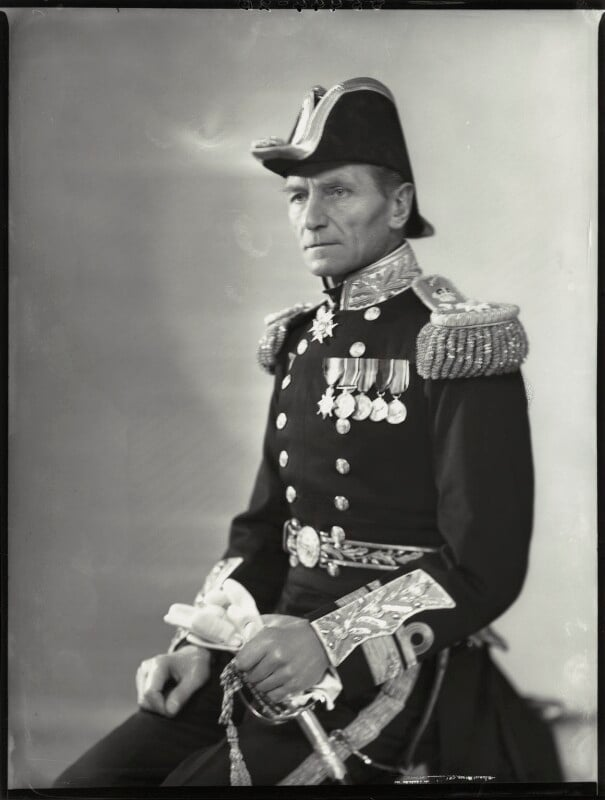
- Wodehouse in 1939
- Born: Norman Atherton Wodehouse; 18 May 1887; Basford, Nottinghamshire, England
- Died: 4 July 1941 (aged 54); Atlantic Ocean, near the Canary Islands
- Military career
- Allegiance: United Kingdom
- Branch: Royal Navy
- Service years: 1904–1941

Rugby union career
- Position: Forward
Senior career
Years	Team	Apps	(Points)
- United Services Rugby Football Club
–	Royal Navy Rugby Union		
International career
Years	Team	Apps	(Points)
1910-1913	England	14	

Vice-Admiral Norman Atherton Wodehouse CB (18 May 1887 – 4 July 1941) was a Royal Navy officer killed in the Second World War. He had gained 14 caps for England at rugby union, including six as captain between 1910 and 1913. Wodehouse was acting as a convoy commodore when his ship was sunk by a German U-boat.

== Naval career ==
Wodehouse joined the Royal Navy in 1902, serving as a midshipman in the Atlantic Fleet in 1904. During the First World War Wodehouse served in the battleship HMS Revenge at the Battle of Jutland as a gunnery officer. After the war he was appointed aide-de-camp to King George VI and appointed a Companion of the Order of the Bath. He commanded Royal Naval College, Dartmouth from 1931 to 1934.

Just before the outbreak of the Second World War Wodehouse became Rear Admiral, Gibraltar, a post he held until November 1939. He was placed on the Retired List in 1940 and in 1941 became a Convoy Commodore in the Royal Naval Reserve. He was killed onboard the merchant vessel Robert L. Holt when it was sunk in the Atlantic Ocean, southwest of the Canary Islands by U-69 on 4 July 1941, after he had ordered the South Africa bound convoy OB 337 he was commanding to scatter due to the attacks by German submarines. U-69 sunk the Robert L. Holt in a gun duel. The U-boat fired 102 high explosive rounds and 34 incendiary rounds from the deck gun, 220 rounds from the 20mm gun and 400 rounds with the MG34. Robert L. Holt was sunk with the loss of all 56 crew including Wodehouse.

== Family ==
He married Mrs Theodosia Frances Swire, née Boyle (1890–1966), daughter of Commander Edward Boyle and Theodosia Ogilvie, and widow of Captain Douglas William Swire (d. 1920), on 22 October 1923.

By his wife Theodosia, he had two sons:

- Rev. Armine Boyle Wodehouse (1924-2017), who has been twice married (once widowed), and has had issue, one son and two daughters.
- Charles Norman Boyle Wodehouse, (1927-2011), who has married, and has issue, one son and two daughters.

== See also ==
- List of England rugby union footballers killed in the World Wars

Military offices
Preceded by New Post	Rear Admiral Gibraltar; May 1939–November 1939	Succeeded by Commander in Chief, North Atlantic
