= HMS Caradoc (D60) =

British C-class light cruiser

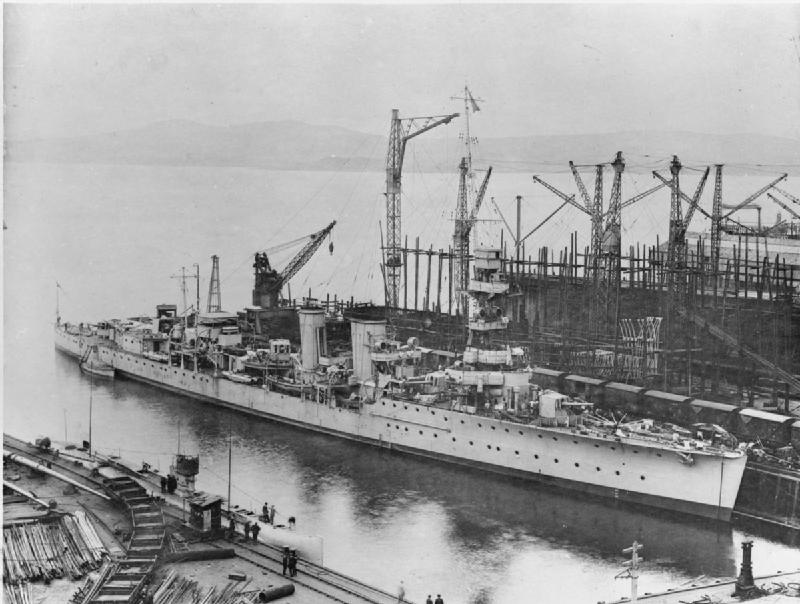
- Caradoc fitting out at Scotts' Greenock Yard. Submarine HMS G14 is in the foreground

History

United Kingdom
- Name: Caradoc
- Namesake: Caradoc
- Builder: Scotts Shipbuilding and Engineering Company, Greenock
- Laid down: 21 February 1916
- Launched: 23 December 1916
- Commissioned: 15 June 1917
- Decommissioned: December 1945
- Reclassified: Became an accommodation ship, April 1944
- Identification: Pennant number: A0 (Jun 17); 28 (Jan 18); 55 (Apr 18); 60 (Nov 19); I.60 (1936); D.60 (1940)
- Fate: Sold for scrap, 5 April 1946

General characteristics (as built)
- Class & type: C-class light cruiser
- Displacement: 4,238 long tons (4,306 t)
- Length: 425 ft (129.5 m) (p/p); 450 ft (137.2 m) (o/a)
- Beam: 42 ft 3 in (12.9 m)
- Draught: 18 ft 9 in (5.72 m) (mean, deep load)
- Installed power: 6 × Yarrow boilers; 40,000 shp (30,000 kW)
- Propulsion: 2 × shafts; 2 × geared steam turbines
- Speed: 29 kn (54 km/h; 33 mph)
- Complement: 438
- Armament: 5 × single 6 in (152 mm) guns; 2 × single QF 3 in (76 mm) 20-cwt (Note: "Cwt" is the abbreviation for hundredweight, 20 cwt referring to the weight of the gun.) AA guns; 4 × twin 21 in (533 mm) torpedo tubes
- Armour: Waterline belt: 1.25–3 in (32–76 mm); Deck: 1 in (25 mm); Conning tower: 3 in

HMS Caradoc was a C-class light cruiser built for the Royal Navy during World War I. She was one of the four ships of the Caledon sub-class. Assigned to the Grand Fleet during the war, the ship participated in the Second Battle of Heligoland Bight in late 1917. Caradoc was briefly deployed to the Baltic in late 1918 supporting anti-Bolshevik forces during the British campaign in the Baltic and then was transferred to the Mediterranean Fleet in early 1919 and spent the next year and a half doing the same thing in the Black Sea during the Russian Civil War. The ship was withdrawn from the Black Sea in mid-1920 to observe the Greco-Turkish War of 1919–22 and the Chanak Crisis of late 1922. Caradoc spent most of the rest of her time between the World Wars overseas or in reserve with deployments to the Far East and the North America and West Indies Station.

Recommissioned before the start of World War II in September 1939, she returned to the North American Station where she helped to intercept two German blockade-runners. The ship was transferred to the Eastern Fleet in early 1942, but saw no action before she was converted into a training ship in mid-1943 in South Africa. Caradoc was sent to Ceylon where she became an accommodation ship in 1944. She briefly became the fleet flagship in August 1945 before returning home later in the year. The ship was placed in reserve at the end of the year and sold for scrap in early 1946.

== Design and description ==
The C-class cruisers were intended to escort the fleet and defend it against enemy destroyers attempting to close within torpedo range. The Caledon sub-class was a slightly larger and improved version of the preceding Centaur sub-class with a more powerful armament. The ships were 450 feet 6 inches (137.3 m) long overall, with a beam of 42 feet 3 inches (12.9 m) and a deep draught of 18 feet 9 inches (5.7 m). Displacement was 4,238 long tons (4,306 t) at normal and 4,911 long tons (4,990 t) at deep load. Caradoc was powered by two geared Parsons steam turbines, each driving one propeller shaft, which produced a total of 40,000 shaft horsepower (30,000 kW). The turbines used steam generated by six Yarrow boilers which gave her a speed of about 29 knots (54 km/h; 33 mph). She carried 935 long tons (950 t) tons of fuel oil. The ship had a crew of about 400 officers and ratings; this increased to 437 when serving as a flagship.

The main armament of the Caledon-class ships consisted of five BL 6-inch (152 mm) Mk XII guns that were mounted on the centreline. One gun was forward of the bridge, two were fore and aft of the two funnels and the last two were in the stern, with one gun superfiring over the rearmost gun. The two QF 3-inch (76 mm) 20-cwt anti-aircraft (AA) guns were positioned abreast the fore funnel. The torpedo armament of the Caledons was four times more powerful than that of the Centaurs, with eight 21 in (533 mm) torpedo tubes in four twin mounts, two on each broadside. The Caledons were protected by a waterline belt: 1.5–3 in (38–76 mm) thick and had a protective deck that was 1 in (25 mm) thick over the steering gear. The walls of the conning tower had a thickness of 3 inches.

== Construction and career ==
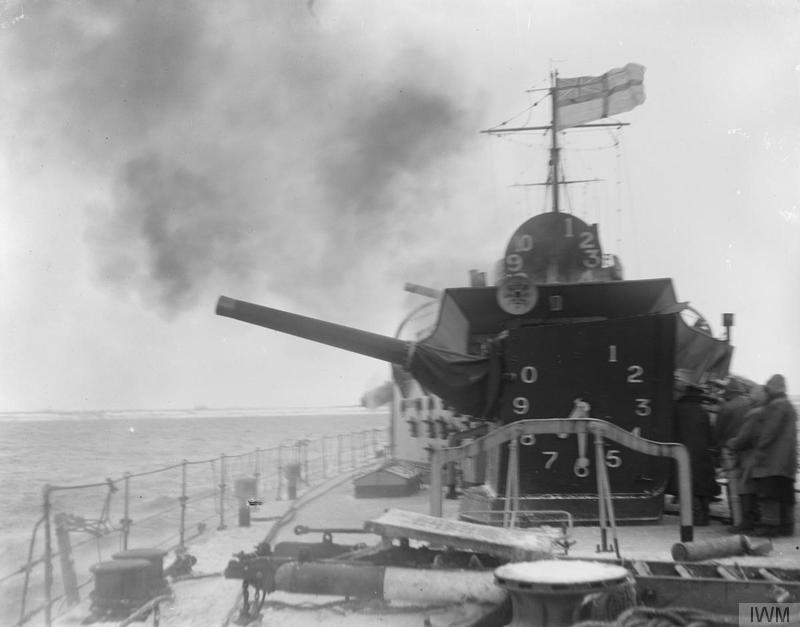
Caradoc bombarding Bolshevik positions on Estonian coast, December 1918

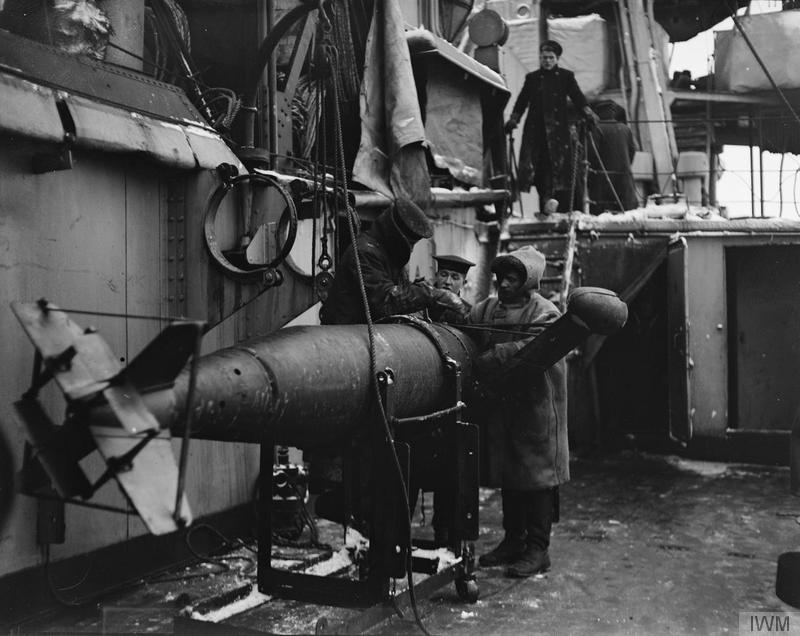
Paravane maintenance

Caradoc, the second ship of her name to serve in the Royal Navy, was ordered in December 1915 as part of the 1915–16 War Programme. The ship was laid down by Scotts Shipbuilding and Engineering Company at their Greenock shipyard on 21 February 1916. She was launched on 23 December 1916 and completed on 15 June 1917. She was assigned to the 6th Light Cruiser Squadron (LCS) of the Grand Fleet together with three other C-class cruisers. With her sister Cassandra (1916), she ran aground on Fair Isle on 15 August, but both ships were successfully refloated.

Caradoc was back in action by 17 November when she participated in the Second Battle of Heligoland Bight. This was a successful attempt by the British to intercept German minesweeping forces that were clearing British minefields in the North Sea. The 6th LCS screened the two light Courageous-class battlecruisers of the 1st Cruiser Squadron during the battle together with the 1st Light Cruiser Squadron. The British lost the German minesweepers in the smoke screen laid by the four German light cruisers and pursued the latter ships for most of the battle, although they inflicted little damage in the poor visibility caused by the German smoke. Caradoc, being the rear ship in her squadron, fired the least. She did not score any hits on her opponents, nor did they damage her.

In 1917–18, her conning tower was replaced by an enlarged bridge and her 9-foot (2.7 m) rangefinders were exchanged for 12-foot (3.7 m) models. In November 1918, the ship was based at Rosyth and escorted the German High Seas Fleet as they sailed to Scapa Flow on 21 November to be interned. A few days later, the 6th LCS was ordered to the Baltic Sea to support the Baltic States as they attempted to secure their independence from Russia. While stopped in Copenhagen, Denmark, en route, Caradoc pulled off the collier, SS Tregarth, after she had run aground. Together with her half-sister Cardiff and five destroyers, the ship bombarded Bolshevik positions with 155 six-inch shells east of Reval (Tallinn), Estonia, on 14 December and brought the Russian offensive to a halt after they destroyed the one bridge connecting them with Petrograd. Almost two weeks later, she helped to capture the Russian destroyer Avtroil near Reval on 27 December, which was later turned over to the Estonians. At the beginning of January 1919, Caradoc and her sister Calypso ferried 500 Finnish volunteers from Helsingfors (Helsinki) to Reval and then bombarded the Bolsheviks in conjunction with an Estonian offensive on 4 January. The 6th LCS was recalled immediately afterwards and arrived back in Rosyth on 10 January.

The ship was transferred to the 3rd Light Cruiser Squadron of the Mediterranean Fleet on 29 February. By 19 April she was stationed in the Crimea in support of the anti-Bolshevik Volunteer Army. On 22 April, aerial reconnaissance reported that the Red Army was massing at Kaffa Bay in the town of Vladislovovka. The Greek battleship Lemnos and Caradoc bombarded the town, forcing the Soviet forces to withdraw. Joined by her half-sister Centaur, and the destroyer Parthian, Caradoc and Lemnos again bombarded Soviet troops two days later, this time in the village of Parpach. On 2 May, Caradoc and the newly arrived battleship Emperor of India helped to break up a Bolshevik attack. Three months later, she was hit by three 3-inch shells as she engaged Bolshevik coastal artillery at Ochakov, but suffered no casualties or damage. Later that month, she supported an amphibious landing by the Volunteer Army near Odessa. In mid-October, the ship supported a Volunteer Army offensive near Yalta.

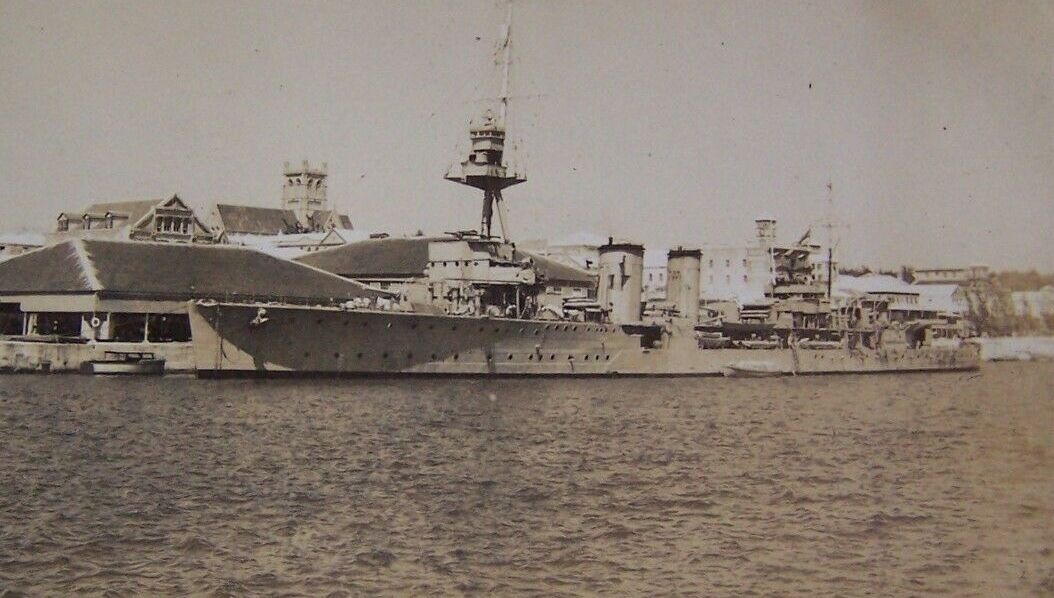
Caradoc in Hamilton, Bermuda, ca. 1928

By April 1920, Caradoc was deployed off the coast of Georgia supporting the Volunteer Army against the Bolsheviks and continued to do so through May. She was withdrawn from Georgia in June in response to the Greek offensives during the Greco-Turkish War and arrived in Istanbul on 18 June. During the Chanak Crisis of September 1922, the ship was deployed to watch the Gulf of Smyrna. Caradoc participated in the withdrawal of ships from Turkish waters in December 1922 as the Treaty of Lausanne that ended the war was being negotiated. The ship remained in the Mediterranean until December 1926 when she was briefly transferred to the China Station. Around 1924–1926, she was fitted with a pair of 2-pounder (40 mm) Mk II "pom-pom" AA guns. After returning home, Caradoc began a lengthy refit from 15 September 1927 to October 1928 when she was assigned to the North America and West Indies Station based at the Royal Naval Dockyard in Bermuda. The ship remained there until February 1930 when she returned to the UK and was briefly placed in reserve. Caradoc was recommissioned in July for service on the China Station with the 5th Cruiser Squadron. She returned home four years later and was again placed in reserve on 17 October 1934.

=== Second World War ===
At the beginning of the war on 3 September 1939, Caradoc was at Portland Harbour and was reassigned to operate off the North American coast shortly afterwards. The following month, she ferried £ two million of gold to Halifax, Nova Scotia. On 23 October the light cruiser Orion (85) and the Canadian destroyer Saguenay spotted the German oil tanker Emmy Friedrich in the Yucatán Channel. When Caradoc stopped the ship, the Germans scuttled her to prevent her capture. On 11 December 1940 the German blockade runner Rhein was intercepted by the Dutch sloop Van Kinsbergen west of the Florida Strait. Rhein was set on fire by her own crew to prevent her capture and the wreck was sunk later that day by Caradoc. The ship was refitted in New York City between 28 October 1941–26 February 1942 where her "pom-pom"s were exchanged for five 20-millimeter (0.8 in) Oerlikon light AA guns on single mounts. In addition Caradoc was fitted with a Type 271 and Type 290 surface-search radars.

The ship was then assigned to the Eastern Fleet where she remained until 1943. She was converted into a gunnery training ship in Durban, South Africa, between 21 June–3 July, and was transferred to Colombo, Ceylon, in 1944. Caradoc became an accommodation ship in April 1944 and then the flagship of the East Indies Fleet, as the Eastern Fleet had been renamed, in August 1945. She was placed in reserve in December 1945 after she returned home. The ship was sold for scrap on 5 April 1946 and subsequently broken up at Briton Ferry, Wales.

== Bibliography ==
- Colledge, J. J.; Warlow, Ben (2006) [1969]. Ships of the Royal Navy: The Complete Record of All Fighting Ships of the Royal Navy from the 15th Century to the Present (3rd Rev ed.). London: Chatham Publishing. ISBN 978-1-86176-281-8. OCLC 67375475.
- Friedman, Norman (2010). British Cruisers: Two World Wars and After. Barnsley, South Yorkshire, UK: Seaforth. ISBN 978-1-59114-078-8.
- Halpern, Paul, ed. (2011). The Mediterranean Fleet 1920–1929. Navy Records Society Publications. Vol. 158. Ashgate. ISBN 978-1-4094-2756-8.
- Head, Michael (2009). "The Baltic Campaign, 1918–1920, Pt. I". Warship International. XLVI (2): 135–50. ISSN 0043-0374.
- McBride, Keith (1990). "The Weird Sisters". In Gardiner, Robert (ed.). Warship. Vol. 1990. Naval Institute Press. pp. 102–117. ISBN 1-55750-903-4.
- Newbolt, Henry (1996) [1931]. Naval Operations. History of the Great War Based on Official Documents. Vol. V. Battery Press. ISBN 0-89839-255-1.
- Raven, Alan & Roberts, John (1980). British Cruisers of World War Two. Naval Institute Press. ISBN 0-87021-922-7.
- Rohwer, Jürgen (2005). Chronology of the War at Sea 1939–1945: The Naval History of World War Two (Third Revised ed.). Naval Institute Press. ISBN 1-59114-119-2.
- "Transcript: HMS CARADOC – November to December 1918, UK out, Baltic". Royal Navy Log Books of the World War 1 Era. Naval-History.net.
- Whitley, M. J. (1995). Cruisers of World War Two: An International Encyclopedia. Cassell. ISBN 1-86019-874-0.
