= Assistant Chief of the Naval Staff (Home) =

British Navy post 1942-1945

- Ensign of the Royal Navy
- Admiralty Department
- Member of: Board of Admiralty
- Reports to: Vice Chief of the Naval Staff
- Nominator: First Lord of the Admiralty
- Appointer: Prime Minister; Subject to formal approval by the Queen-in-Council
- Term length: Not fixed (typically 1–3 years)
- Inaugural holder: Rear-Admiral Arthur Power
- Formation: 1940-1945

The Assistant Chief of the Naval Staff (Home) was a senior British Royal Navy appointment. The post holder was part of the Admiralty Naval Staff and member of the Board of Admiralty from 1942 to 1945.

== History ==
Established as a new position in 1940 as part of the restructuring of the responsibilities of the Assistant Chief of Naval Staff the post holder was a part of the Admiralty Naval Staff and member of the Board of Admiralty. He was responsible for supervising the directors of a number of naval staff divisions namely the Anti-Submarine and Warfare Division, Local Defence Division, Operations Division (Home), Operations Division (Mining) and the Training and Staff Duties Division until 1945.

== Office Holders ==
Included:

- Rear-Admiral Arthur Power, — (May 1940–May 1942)
- Rear-Admiral Patrick Brind, — (May 1942–August 1944)
- Rear-Admiral Desmond McCarthy, — (August 1944–October 1945)
