= Assistant Chief of the Naval Staff (Operations) =

- Ensign of the Royal Navy
- Admiralty Department (1945-1946); Navy Department (Ministry of Defence) (1966-1968)
- Member of: Board of Admiralty
- Reports to: Vice Chief of the Naval Staff
- Nominator: First Lord of the Admiralty
- Appointer: Prime Minister; Subject to formal approval by the Queen-in-Council
- Term length: Not fixed (typically 1–3 years)
- Inaugural holder: Rear-Admiral Desmond McCarthy
- Formation: 1945-1946, 1966-1968

The Assistant Chief of the Naval Staff (Operations) was a senior British Royal Navy appointment. The post holder was part of the Admiralty Naval Staff and member of the Board of Admiralty from 1945 to 1946 and the Admiralty Board from 1966 to 1968,

== History ==
The post was established in October 1945 following re-structuring of responsibilities of the Assistant Chief of Naval Staff of one of his responsibilities. The post holder was a part of the Admiralty Naval Staff and member of the Board of Admiralty. The office holder was responsible for supervising the directors of a number of naval staff divisions originally the Operations Division until December 1946 when the post was abolished. In 1966 the office was revived until 1968 when it was replaced by the Assistant Chief of the Naval Staff (Operations and Air).

== Office holders ==
Included:

- Rear-Admiral Desmond McCarthy: October 1945-December 1946

Post in abeyance

- Rear-Admiral Josef Bartosik: April 1966-July 1968
