= Mercantile Movements Division (Royal Navy) =

Directorate of the British Admiralty, 1917–1920

Agency overview
- Formed: 1917-1920
- Preceding agency: Anti-Submarine Division (A.D.A.S.D) Operations Convoys
- Superseding agency: Tactical Division
- Jurisdiction: United Kingdom
- Headquarters: Admiralty, London
- Agency executive: Director of Mercantile Movements
- Parent agency: Admiralty Naval Staff

The Mercantile Movements Division originally known as the Convoy Section was a former Directorate of the British Admiralty, Naval Staff that coordinated, organised and plotted all Merchant Navy convoys, routing and schedules from 1917 until 1920.

== History ==
Responsibility for the convoy system was administered by the Admiralty as early as 1914. A specific Convoy Section of the Naval Staff was originally established 25 June 1917 as part of the Anti-Submarine Division with the appointment of an Organizing Manager of Convoys the Convoy Section coordinated with the Ministry of Shipping who was responsible for Merchant Shipping and the Naval Intelligence Division to organise all convoy, routings and schedules. Although planning of routes for all convoys including there escorting vessels was usually supervised by the Assistant Chief of the Naval Staff as he was responsible for trade protection and anti-submarine operations.

In September 1917 the Admiralty dually became responsible for the control of the ships of the British Merchant Navy together with the movements of the British Fleet. It established the Mercantile Movements Division under the control of a Director of Mercantile Movements to administer this arrangement. However, in the case of convoys a different system had to be devised, This was owing to the difficulty of transmitting information and the problems it caused unless complete control over any convoy when it was finally at sea had to come under jurisdiction of the Admiralty when this was agreed to the movements of convoys for the majority of there journey would then be directed by the Mercantile Movements Division and convoys were usually “plotted” from day to day.

In order to avert as many problems as possible certain alternative measures were adopted, for example convoys when travelling at night without lights had to be diverted of one another. In order to achieve this use of wireless telegraphy was employed to transmit course changes to convoys, particularly if they came within close 'proximity' of each other. They were also directed to avoid certain areas where it was known German U-boat's were operating. Other measures put in place involved altering agreed destination of some ships as they approached home waters.

As convoys approached from the North East Atlantic and U.K. home waters, usually being the Celtic, Irish, North Sea's and English Channel, they would then be within the strategic responsibility of the Commanders-in-Chief of the Coast of Ireland, Devonport, Portsmouth, and the Commander of the Dover Patrol, at that point they were taken in charge by one or other of them. Port staff would keep a record of all movements of ships passing through or working within in each Command, this enabled area Commander-in-Chief to action operational requirements where they deemed necessary. During the interwar years the division was disbanded as a distinct entity and its previous functions were amalgamated within the Tactical Division. In 1939 at the beginning of World War II the Trade Division assumed overall responsibility for planning, control and protection of all British merchant shipping from the Tactical Division until 1945.

== Directors duties ==
- Control all assembly points of all convoys and vessels.
- Ensure cooperation between the loading and discharging of cargoes and convoy requirements.
- Intercommunicate with the Director of Anti-Submarine Division
- Liaise with the Ministry of Shipping.
- Mediate with the Director of Naval Intelligence Division.
- Synchronize shipping needs with convoy needs.

== Heads of section/division ==
Included:

=== Organising Manager of Convoys ===
- Mr. H. W. Eldon Manisty, 25 June 1917 - 10 September 1917

=== Directors of Mercantile Movements ===
- Captain Frederic A. Whitehead, 10 September 1917 – 19 January 1919
- Captain Bertram H. Smith, 19 January 1919 – 30 September 1919

== Structure of Division ==
As of 1917

- Office of the Director of Mercantile Movements............Office of the Secretary to the Director of Mercantile Movements and Division Staff Paymaster.
  - Casualty Section.....Chart Room.....General Staff Section
  - Routeing Section.....Tug Section.....Home Section
  - Office of the deputy director of Mercantile Movements
    - Convoy Section
      - Convoy 3 (Japan)
      - Convoy 4 (Japan)
      - Convoy 5 (Japan)
      - Convoy 6 (Japan)
      - Convoy 7 (Japan)
      - Convoy 8 (Japan)
      - Convoy 9 (Japan)
      - Convoy 10 (Japan)
      - Convoy 1 (USA)
      - Convoy 13 (USA)
      - Convoy 14 (USA)
      - Convoy 16 (USA)
      - Convoy 17 (USA)
  - Office of the Fleet Pay Master & Organising Manager of Convoy
    - Inbound Ports of Assembly
      - Gibraltar
      - Freetown, Sierra Leone
      - Dakar, Senegal
      - Hampton Roads (U.S.A.)
      - New York, (U.S.A.)
      - Halifax, Nova Scotia
      - Sydney, Cape Breton, Nova Scotia
      - Yokohama, Japan
    - Outbound Ports of Assembly
      - Lamlash, Scotland
      - Milford Haven, England
      - Queenstown, Ireland
      - Falmouth, England
      - Plymouth, England

Note Each inbound port served a certain area of trade, and vessels engaged in that trade met at the port of assembly for convoy to the United Kingdom or to France.

== Timeline ==
- Board of Admiralty, Admiralty Naval Staff, Anti-Submarine Division, (1914-1917). (established convoy section)
- Board of Admiralty, Admiralty Naval Staff, Mercantile Movements Division, (1917-1920).
- Board of Admiralty, Admiralty Naval Staff, Tactical Division, (1921-1939) - (responsible for convoy movements).
- Board of Admiralty, Admiralty Naval Staff, Trade Division, (1939-1945) - (responsible for convoys).

== Sources ==
- Black, Nicholas. "‘The Admiralty War Staff and its influence on the conduct of the naval between 1914 and 1918.’" (PDF). discovery.ucl.ac.uk. University College London, 2006.
- Black, Nicholas (2009). The British Naval Staff in the First World War. Boydell Press. ISBN 9781843834427.
- Hunt, Barry D. (2006). Sailor-Scholar: Admiral Sir Herbert Richmond 1871-1946. Wilfrid Laurier Univ. ISBN 9780889207660.
- Jellicoe, John Rushworth, Admiral of the Fleet (1920). "The crisis of the naval war". London: Cassell and Company, Ltd.
