= Signal Division (Royal Navy) =

Historical division of the British Royal Navy

Division overview
- Formed: 1914
- Preceding Division: Signal Section
- Dissolved: 1964
- Superseding Division: Communications Division
- Jurisdiction: Government of the United Kingdom
- Headquarters: Admiralty Building Whitehall London
- Parent department: Admiralty Naval Staff

The Signal Division was a Directorate of the Admiralty Naval Staff responsible for policy, control and management of all naval communications from 1914 to 1964.

== History ==
In 1906 the Admiralty set up a Signals Committee to initially investigate signaling between Royal Navy vessels and Merchant Navy vessels, in 1914 the Admiralty War Staff had established an expanded Signal Section to deal with all shore to ship communications following the abolition of the war staff function. The Signal Division was established on the 18 August 1917 the divisions primary role was for receiving and sending signals to ships at sea and stations ashore, but also for the coding or cyphering of the signals. In September 1919 the division was renamed the Communications Division until 1927 when it was again re-styled Signal Section still within the Naval Staff until 1941 when it reverted to Signal Division, it continued as a component part of the Naval Staff until 1964 when the Admiralty Department was abolished and replaced by a new Navy Department within the Ministry of Defence.

== Directors of Division ==
Included:

=== First World War ===
==== Director Signal Section ====
- Rear-Admiral Sydney R. Fremantle, September, 1914 – July, 1915.
- Captain Christopher R. Payne, January, 1916 – May, 1917.

==== Director Signal Division ====
- Captain Edward M. Phillpotts, August, 1917 – December 1917.
- Acting Captain Richard L. Nicholson, January, 1918 – November, 1919.

=== Interwar ===
==== Director Communications Division ====
- Captain Rudolf M. Burmester: November 1919-April 1920
- Captain Henry K. Kitson, July, 1921 – February, 1923.
- Captain Raymond Fitzmaurice: February 1923-February 1925
- Captain James F.Somerville: February 1925-February 1927

==== Director Signal Section ====
- Captain Charles E. Kennedy-Purvis: February 1927-March 1930
- Captain James W.S.Dorling: March 1930-April 1932
- Captain Arthur J. L. Murray: April 1932-September 1934
- Captain Guy W.Hallifax: September 1934-October 1935
- Captain W. Tofield Makeig-Jones: October 1935-September 1937
- Captain Philip F. Glover: September 1937 – 1939

=== Second World War ===
==== Director Signal Division ====
- Captain Philip F. Glover: September 1940 – 1941
- Rear-Admiral Cedric S. Holland: March 1942-November 1943
- Rear-Admiral Vaughan Morgan: November 1943-October 1945
- Captain John R.S. Haines: October 1945-April 1947

=== Post War ===
==== Director Signal Division ====
- Captain Gilbert R. Waymouth: April 1947-September 1949
- Captain Ralph G. Swallow: September 1949-December 1951
- Captain Roy S. Foster-Brown: December 1951-February 1954
- Captain Alwyn D. Lenox-Conyngham: February 1954-November 1955
- Captain Robert F. T. Stannard: November 1955-November 1957
- Captain Christopher A. James: November 1957-November 1959
- Captain Edward T.L. Dunsterville: November 1959-March 1960
- Captain W. John Parker: March 1960-November 1961
- Captain John R.G. Trechman: November 1961-January 1965

== Deputy Directors of Division ==
Included:

- Captain Patrick W.B. Brooking: August 1939-July 1941
- Captain Francis J. Wylie: July 1941-March 1943
- Captain Charles L. Firth: July 1941-May 1943
- Captain Sir Philip W. Bowyer-Smith, Bt.: November 1941-October 1943
- Captain J.Peter L. Reid: March 1943-December 1944
- Captain Herbert F.H. Layman: February 1944 – 1945
- Captain Charles L. Firth: December 1944-December 1945
- Captain Laurence G. Durlacher: December 1945-March 1948
- Captain Peter Dawnay: March 1948-March 1950
- Captain Earl Cairns: March 1950-March 1952
- Captain Edward T.L. Dunsterville: March 1952-March 1954
- Captain Charles P. Mills: March 1954-April 1956
- Captain Christopher A. James: April 1956-November 1957
- Captain Robert R.B. Mackenzie: November 1957-December 1959
- Captain Ian F. Sommerville: December 1959-February 1961
- Captain the Hon. David P. Seely: February 1961-August 1963
- Captain Douglas A. Poynter: August 1963-August 1965

== Attribution ==
Primary source for this article is by Harley Simon, Lovell Tony, (2017), Signal Division (Royal Navy), dreadnoughtproject.org, http://www.dreadnoughtproject.org.

== Sources ==
- Archives, The National. "Admiralty Signal Division: History", Vol 2. discovery.nationalarchives.gov.uk. National Archives, 1936 . ADM 116/3404.
- Archives, The National. "Records of Naval Staff Departments". discovery.nationalarchives.gov.uk. National Archives, 1883-1978, ADM Division 10.
- Black, Nicholas (2009). The British Naval Staff in the First World War. Woodbridge: The Boydell Press. ISBN 9781843834427.
- Mackie, Colin, (2010-2014), British Armed Services between 1860 and the present day — Royal Navy - Senior Appointments, http://www.gulabin.com/.
- Rodger. N.A.M., (1979) The Admiralty (offices of state), T. Dalton, Lavenham, ISBN 978-0900963940
- Smith, Gordon (2014), British Admiralty, Part 2 - Changes in Admiralty Departments 1913-1920, Naval-History.Net.
