= Ships of the Royal Navy =

Reference books on the UK navy

- Cover of 2006 edition
- Author: J. J. Colledge; Ben Warlow; Steve Bush
- Language: English
- Genre: Non-fiction
- Publisher: Greenhill Books
- Publication date: 1969-2020
- Publication place: United Kingdom
- ISBN: 978-1-86176-281-8

Ships of the Royal Navy is a naval history reference work by J. J. Colledge (1908–1997); it provides brief alphabetical dictionary-like entries on all recorded ships in commission in the Royal Navy from the 14th century, giving location of construction, date of launch, tonnage, specification and fate. The 2020 edition had over 15,000 entries going back to 1300.

It was originally published in two volumes by Greenhill Books. Volume 1 (1969) covers major ships; Volume 2 (1970) covers Navy-built trawlers, drifters, tugs and requisitioned ships including Armed Merchant Cruisers.

The book is a standard one-or-two volume reference work on ships of the Royal Navy. Colledge's conventions and spellings of names are used by museums, libraries and archives. For more data on ships of the pre-1863 Royal Navy, see British Warships in the Age of Sail.

After the original books fell out of print, Colledge published in 1987 a revised Volume 1, adding the ships of the late 20th century. A similar revision of Volume 2 followed in 1989. Colledge made no more revision, dying in 1997. Ben Warlow, a retired naval officer associated with the Naval Historical Branch, took over the task of publishing a second revision of Volume 1 in 2003, reinstating some of the smaller vessels that the first revision had omitted; no second revision of Volume 2 was done at the time. A third revision of Volume 1 was published in 2006, also by Warlow. In 2010, Warlow followed with an expanded fourth revision, this time incorporating both Volume 1 and 2 containing the smaller and exotic vessels, such as requisitioned ships, e.g. Armed merchant cruisers, Merchant aircraft carriers, as well as small craft, e.g. landing craft and Admiralty-built trawlers. A fifth revision was completed in 2020, again including both volumes, by Warlow along with Steve Bush. It incorporates, for the first time, the ships of the Royal Fleet Auxiliary, a branch separate from the Royal Navy.

== Table ==
Revision	Volume	Year	Title	Reviser
Original	1: Major Ships	1969	Ships of the Royal Navy: An Historical Index	Colledge
Original	2: Navy-built Trawlers, Drifters, Tugs and Requisitioned Ships	1970	Ships of the Royal Navy: An Historical Index	Colledge
1st Rev	1: Major Ships	1987	Ships of the Royal Navy: The Complete Record of All Fighting Ships of the Royal Navy	Colledge
1st Rev	2: Navy-built Trawlers, Drifters, Tugs and Requisitioned Ships	1989	Ships of the Royal Navy: The Complete Record of All Fighting Ships of the Royal Navy	Colledge
2nd Rev	Major Ships	2003	Ships of the Royal Navy: The Complete Record of All Fighting Ships of the Royal Navy	Warlow
3rd Rev	Major Ships	2006	Ships of the Royal Navy: The Complete Record of All Fighting Ships of the Royal Navy from the 15th Century to the Present	Warlow
4th Rev	Combined Vol. 1 & 2	2010	Ships of the Royal Navy: The Complete Record of All Fighting Ships of the Royal Navy	Warlow
5th Rev	Combined Vol. 1 & 2	2020	Ships of the Royal Navy: The Complete Record of all Fighting Ships of the Royal Navy from the 15th Century to the Present	Warlow & Bush
