= Naval Air Organisation and Training Division (Royal Navy) =

British Royal Navy, naval staff

- Active: 1944-1961
- Country: United Kingdom
- Allegiance: British Empire
- Branch: Royal Navy
- Type: Staff Division
- Part of: A.C.N.S. (1944—1961)
- Garrison/HQ: Admiralty; Whitehall; London, Great Britain

The Naval Air Organisation and Training Division was a staff division of the Admiralty Naval Staff established in July 1944 It continued to operate until 1961 when it was deactivated. The staff division was administered by the Director Air Organisation and Training who reported both to the Assistant Chief of the Naval Staff and the Fifth Sea Lord as Chief of Naval Aviation.

== History ==
The division started out as a specialist section with the Naval Air Warfare Division in April 1940 administered by, Acting-Commander R. S. Palairet until July 1944 when the Naval Air Organisation and Training Division established as an independent staff division, command then passed to the incoming Director Naval Air Organisation and Training Captain K. S. Colquhoun. It was in operation as part of the Admiralty Naval Staff until 1961. (Note: The division is not listed under heading "divisions of the naval staff" in the Navy List issue in February 1962 pp.906-908) The division was under the Assistant Chief of the Naval Staff in regards to policy and organisation and Fifth Sea Lord who was responsible for supervising the division until December 1961.
