= Minesweeping Division (Royal Navy) =

- Active: 1917-1918, 1939-1943
- Country: United Kingdom
- Allegiance: British Empire
- Branch: Royal Navy
- Type: Staff Division
- Part of: A.C.N.S. (1917—1918); A. C. N. S. (U boat and Trade) (1939—1943)
- Garrison/HQ: Admiralty; Whitehall; London, Great Britain

The Minesweeping Division was a staff division of the Admiralty Naval Staff first established during World War I (1917-1918) the deactivated. It was re-activated during World War II (1939-1943) before being abolished. It was administered by the Director of Minesweeping Division

== History ==
The division was established during the first world war in May 1917 where it reported to the Assistant Chief of the Naval Staff until 1918. when it was disbanded. (Note: In 1918 the First Sea Lord and Chief of Naval Staff Admiral of the Fleet Sir Rosslyn Wemyss re-organised the Naval Staff accordingly: Deputy Chief of the Naval Staff responsible for Home Waters and under him Air, Operations (Home), Plans and Signal divisions, Assistant Chief of Naval Staff responsible for Trade Protection under him Anti-Submarine, Mercantile Movements, Minsweeping and Trade Divisions, Deputy First Sea Lord responsible for Policy and Overseas under him Operations (Foreign) division) The division was reestablished in 1939 at the beginning of world war two and was in operation until 1943 before it was abolished. The division during the latter period was under the supervision of the Assistant Chief of the Naval Staff (U boat and Trade).
