= Mobilisation Division (Royal Navy) =

Former division of British Navy

Division overview
- Formed: 1912
- Preceding Division: Naval Mobilisation Department
- Dissolved: 1918
- Superseding Division: Naval Mobilisation Department
- Jurisdiction: Government of the United Kingdom
- Headquarters: Admiralty Building Whitehall London
- Parent department: Admiralty Naval Staff

The Mobilisation Division was the former Directorate of the British Admiralty Naval Staff responsible for mobilisation requirements, manning and war preparation planning from 1912–1918.

== History ==
The Mobilisation Division was established on 8 January 1912 it evolved out of the Naval Mobilisation Department of the Admiralty and was part of both the Admiralty War Staff and Admiralty Naval Staff departments. Mobilisation ceased to be a Naval Staff division on 12 January 1918 when it was re-designated an admiralty department that would now report to the Office of the Second Sea Lord until 1932.

== Responsibilities ==
The division was responsible for the mobilisation of active personnel, in addition to securing crews for all commissioned vessels including those in reserve. It also had to plan for and arrange the requisition of merchant vessels for the purpose of auxiliary purposes. It was also responsible for liaising with various mobilisation (naval employment offices) present all ports to process drafted conscripts. Other duties included the planning and projecting all manning requirements and securing available resources to meet those plans. During world war one in addition to its other duties, the Mobilisation Division was also charged with the responsibility for the supplying the fleet with fuel, from the Naval War Staff point of view.

== Directors duties ==
As of 1917:

- All points connected with mobilisation which are dealt with by members of the Board, are in the first instance to be referred to them for their consideration.
- To prepare and keep correct to date, a complete all plans for mobilising the Naval forces of the Empire with the utmost possible rapidity, and with the least strain on the Admiralty.
- To keep Commanders-in-Chief and Commanding Officers supplied, as may be directed, with all such important information as shall be considered by the Board likely to be of use in war.

== Directors ==
Included:

- Rear-Admiral Alexander Ludovic Duff, October 1912-October 1914.
- Captain Hugh F, P. Sinclair, October 1914-June 1916.
- Rear-Admiral Michael Culme-Seymour, June 1916-September 1918.

== Assistant directors ==
Included:

- Captain John W. L. McClintock, January 1912 - April 1914.
- Captain Geoffrey Hopwood, May 1914 - April 1916.

== Attribution ==
Primary source for this article is by Harley Simon, Lovell Tony, (2016), Mobilisation Department (Royal Navy), dreadnoughtproject.org, http://www.dreadnoughtproject.org.

== Sources ==
- CB1515(50) [later OU 6171/31] The Technical History and Index (Part 50): Mobilisation of the Fleet. Demobilisation Records, 1918–19, written by the Mobilisation Department of the Admiralty, January 1921.
- Archives, The National. "Records of Naval Staff Departments", discovery.nationalarchives.gov.uk. National Archives, 1912-1964.
- Black, Nicholas (2009). The British Naval Staff in the First World War. Woodbridge: The Boydell Press. ISBN 9781843834427.
- Hamilton C. I. (2011) The Making of the Modern Admiralty: British Naval Policy-Making, 1805–1927, Cambridge Military Histories, Cambridge University Press, ISBN 978-1139496544.
- Mackie, Colin, (2010-2014), British Armed Services between 1860 and the present day — Royal Navy - Senior Appointments, http://www.gulabin.com/.
- Rodger. N.A.M., (1979) The Admiralty (offices of state), T. Dalton, Lavenham, ISBN 978-0900963940.
