= Assistant Chief of the Naval Staff (Air) =

- Ensign of the Royal Navy
- Admiralty Department
- Member of: Board of Admiralty
- Reports to: Vice Chief of the Naval Staff
- Nominator: First Lord of the Admiralty
- Appointer: Prime Minister; Subject to formal approval by the Queen-in-Council
- Term length: Not fixed (typically 1–3 years)
- Inaugural holder: Rear-Admiral Reginald Portal
- Formation: 1943-1946

The Assistant Chief of the Naval Staff (Air) was a senior British Royal Navy appointment. The post holder was part of the Admiralty Naval Staff and member of the Board of Admiralty from 1941 to 1946.

== History ==
The post was created in January 1943 as a new office to relieve the Assistant Chief of Naval Staff of one of his responsibilities the post holder was a part of the Admiralty Naval Staff and member of the Board of Admiralty. The office holder was responsible for supervising the directors of a number of naval staff divisions originally the Air Warfare and Training Division and later the Naval Air Warfare and Flying Training Division until April 1946 when the post was abolished.

== Office Holders ==
Included:

- Rear-Admiral Reginald Portal, — (January 1943–November 1944)
- Rear-Admiral Lachlan Mackintosh, — (November 1944–August 1945)
- Rear-Admiral Charles Lambe, — (August 1945–December 1946)
