= Plans Division (Q) Royal Navy =

British Royal Navy, naval staff

Plans Division (Q)
- Active: 1943-1966
- Country: United Kingdom
- Allegiance: British Empire
- Branch: Royal Navy
- Type: Staff (division)
- Part of: Admiralty Naval Staff (1943—1964); Navy Department, Naval Staff (1964—1966)
- Garrison/HQ: Admiralty; Whitehall; London, Great Britain

The Plans Division (Q) was a division of the Admiralty Naval Staff established in 1943 it existed until 1952 when its responsibilities were changed and it was renamed the Administrative Planning Department the new department initially came under control of the Fourth Sea Lord. In 1959 its name was changed again to the Administrative Planning Division. Plans (Q) division was administered by the Director of Plans, (Q)., The department and subsequently division was administered by the Director, Administrative Planning.

== History ==
Established in May 1943 the division originally started out as a specialist section within the Plans Division. Its responsibilities were primarily administrative and logistical planning it remained a distinct division of the naval staff until 1952 when its remit was changed and it was renamed the Administrative Planning Department. The new department then became part of the Fourth Sea Lords organisation. In December 1959 the departments name was changed to the Administrative Planning Division. When the Admiralty merged within the new Ministry of Defence in April 1964 and became the Navy Department (Ministry of Defence) this division continued until 1966 when it was replaced by the Directorate of Administrative Planning of the Naval Staff, Navy Department.
