= Admiralty Staff =

Admiralty Staff could refer to:

- Admiralty Naval Staff (1917-1964)
- German Imperial Admiralty Staff (1899-1918)
