= Assistant Chief of the Naval Staff (Foreign) =

- Ensign of the Royal Navy
- Admiralty Department
- Member of: Board of Admiralty
- Reports to: Vice Chief of the Naval Staff
- Nominator: First Lord of the Admiralty
- Appointer: Prime Minister; Subject to formal approval by the Queen-in-Council
- Term length: Not fixed (typically 1–3 years)
- Inaugural holder: Rear-Admiral Sir Henry Harwood
- Formation: 1940-1945

The Assistant Chief of the Naval Staff (Foreign) was a senior British Royal Navy appointment. The post holder was part of the Admiralty Naval Staff and member of the Board of Admiralty from 1940 to 1945.

== History ==
Established in December 1940 as a new position to ease the burden of the responsibilities on the Assistant Chief of Naval Staff. The post holder was a part of the Admiralty Naval Staff and member of the Board of Admiralty. He was chiefly responsible for supervising the directors of naval staff divisions such as the Gunnery Division (Foreign), Operations Division (Foreign) and the Warfare Division till 1945.

== Office holders ==
Included:

- Rear-Admiral Sir Henry Harwood, — (December 1940–April 1942)
- Rear-Admiral Bernard Rawlings, — (April 1942–February 1943)
- Rear-Admiral Reginald Servaes, — (February 1943–March 1945)
- Rear-Admiral Gerald Bellars, — (March–October 1945)
