= Assistant Chief of the Naval Staff (Weapons) =

- Ensign of the Royal Navy
- Admiralty Department
- Member of: Board of Admiralty
- Reports to: Vice Chief of the Naval Staff
- Nominator: First Lord of the Admiralty
- Appointer: Prime Minister; Subject to formal approval by the Queen-in-Council
- Term length: Not fixed (typically 1–3 years)
- Inaugural holder: Rear-Admiral Rhoderick McGrigor
- Formation: 1941-1946

The Assistant Chief of the Naval Staff (Weapons) was a senior British Royal Navy appointment. The post holder was part of the Admiralty Naval Staff and member of the Board of Admiralty from 1941 to 1946.

== History ==
Originally created in September 1941 as a new position due to the re-evaluating of the responsibilities of the Assistant Chief of Naval Staff the post holder was a part of the Admiralty Naval Staff and member of the Board of Admiralty. The post holder was responsible for supervising the directors of a number of naval staff divisions specifically the Gunnery Division and Torpedo Division's until April 1946 when the post was abolished.

== Office Holders ==
Included:

- Rear-Admiral Rhoderick McGrigor, — (September 1941–March 1943)
- Rear-Admiral Wilfrid Patterson, — (March 1943-February 1945)
- Rear-Admiral Robert Don Oliver, — (February 1945–April 1946)
