= Admiralty War Staff =

Operational planning department in the British Admiralty during World War I

Agency overview
- Formed: 8 January 1912
- Preceding agency: Admiralty Navy War Council
- Dissolved: May 1917
- Superseding agency: Admiralty Naval Staff
- Jurisdiction: Government of the United Kingdom
- Headquarters: Admiralty Building; Whitehall; London
- Agency executives: Chief of the War Staff; Assistant Chief of the War Staff; Special Services War Staff
- Parent department: Admiralty

The Admiralty War Staff was the former senior naval staff operational planning organisation within the British Admiralty that existed from 1912 to 1917. It was instituted on 8 January 1912 by Winston Churchill in his capacity as First Lord of the Admiralty and was in effect a war council whose head reported directly to the First Sea Lord. After the First World War ended, the War Staff was replaced by the Admiralty Naval Staff department.

== History and development ==
The department's development can be traced back to 1887. It evolved out of some of the functions within the Naval Intelligence Department (NID), which originally administered two divisions: Foreign Intelligence Division and Mobilisation Division.

In 1900 a Defence Division was created, later called the War Division, to deal with issues of strategy and defence. In 1902 a fourth function was added, the Trade Division, which was created for matters relating to the protection of merchant shipping.

The Trade Division was abolished in October 1909 in the wake of the Committee of Imperial Defence inquiry into the feud between the First Sea Lord, Admiral Sir John Fisher and former Commander-in-Chief Channel Fleet, Admiral Lord Charles Beresford, when it was discovered that the captain heading the Trade Division had been supplying the latter with confidential information during the inquiry.

Following restructuring the NID was relieved of its responsibility for war planning and strategy when the outgoing Fisher created an Admiralty Navy War Council as a stop-gap remedy to criticisms emanating from the Beresford Inquiry that the Navy needed a naval staff, a role the NID had been in fact fulfilling since at least 1900, if not earlier. After this re-organisation, war planning and strategic matters were transferred to the newly created Naval Mobilisation Department (NMD), and the NID reverted to the position it held prior to 1887, an intelligence collection and collation organisation, but its director remained one of the First Sea Lord's principal advisors.

Sir John Fisher had made known his support for the need of a Naval Staff as early as 1902. In creating a staff the Admiralty was certainly lagging behind, particularly when the War Office had a General Staff department as early as 1904, to deal with the aftermath of the Second Boer War and an assessment of the problems they faced the Admiralty. However, at this point it had no Senior Staff department.

In May 1909, the Director of Naval Intelligence, Rear-Admiral Alexander Bethell, submitted a proposal for a Navy War Council composed of the First Sea Lord as President, the Director of Naval Intelligence as Vice-President, an Assistant Director for War, the President and the Captain of the Royal Naval War College, and the Naval Assistant to the First Sea Lord. The head of the Naval Intelligence Department's War Division and the Commander of the Royal Naval War College were to act as Joint Secretaries.

== Establishment ==
In 1911, Winston Churchill, the First Lord of the Admiralty, communicated to the Prime Minister H. H. Asquith that the First Sea Lord Sir Arthur Wilson was opposed to any formation of a new naval staff, and because of this he insisted that he be relieved of his duties by January 1912. Churchill would continue to brief the Prime Minister as the project developed and advised him as to what the composition of the new staff department might initially entail:

- War Education Division
- War Information Division
- War Planning Division
- War Mobilisation Division

These divisions would be headed by a new Chief of the War Staff answerable to the Board of Admiralty and supported by an Assistant Chief of the War Staff. In January 1912, the First Lord released his communique detailing the administrative function of the new department and listed the following new appointments.

- Chief of the War Staff
- Director of the Operations Division
- Director of the Intelligence Division
- Director of the Mobilization Division

From 1912, onward additional divisions were established headed by directors responsible for their particular function.

At its founding, 12 officers were selected to undergo the new course of training for staff officer. Reginald Plunkett was the first officer selected.

== Duties ==
As stated in the Churchill Memorandum on a War Staff for the Royal Navy Point 10: The functions of the War Staff will be advisory. The Chief of the Staff, when decision has been taken upon any proposal, will be jointly responsible with the secretary for the precise form in which the necessary orders to the Fleet are issued, but the Staff will possess no executive authority. It will discharge no administrative duties. Its responsibilities will end with the tendering of advice and with the accuracy of the facts on which that advice is based.

== Disestablishment ==
In early spring 1917 the name "War Staff" was abolished and a replaced by an Admiralty Naval Staff. The First Sea Lord also assumed title of Chief of Naval Staff (CNS) and staff functions were grouped under two new heads, the Deputy Chief of the Naval Staff (DCNS) and the Assistant Chief of the Naval Staff (ACNS).

== Chiefs of the War Staff ==
Chiefs of the War Staff included:

Rank	Name	Image	In office	Notes	Reference
Rear Admiral	Ernest Troubridge		January 1912 – January 1913		
Admiral	Sir Henry Jackson		January 1913 – July 1914		
Vice Admiral	Sir Doveton Sturdee		July 1914 – November 1914		
Admiral	Henry Oliver		November 1914 – May 1917		

== Assistants to the Chief of the War Staff ==
Assistants to the Chiefs of the War Staff included:

Rank	Name	Image	In office	Notes	Reference
Commander	Tufton Beamish		January 1912 – April 1913		
Captain	Arthur Vyvyan		January 1913 – October 1914		
Lieutenant colonel	John Rose, RMLI		September 1914 – October 1914		
Captain	Sydney Fremantle		September 1914 – July 1915		
Lieutenant colonel	Harry Farquharson, RM		October 1914 – March 1915		
Captain	Arthur May		May 1915 – January 1918		
Captain	Henry W. Grant		May 1915 – January 1918		

== Special Service, War Staff ==
Special Service, War Staff included:

Rank	Name	Image	In office	Notes	Reference
Vice Admiral	Sir Edmond Slade		April 1915 – November 1918	retired flag officer	
Vice Admiral	Sir Douglas Gamble		July 1915 – May 1917	retired flag officer	
Vice Admiral	Sir Robert Ommanney		August 1915 - – November 1918	retired flag officer	
Captain	Charles Dormer		July 1915 – November 1918		
Captain	Egerton Scrivener		July 1915 – November 1918		

== Operational divisions ==
As of December 1916, operational divisions included:

- Anti-Submarine Division, formed in 1916
- Naval Intelligence Division, formed in 1912
- Operations Division, formed in 1912
- Mobilisation Division, formed in 1912
- Signals Section (Combined Operations), formed in 1916
- Trade Division, formed in 1914

== Attribution ==
Primary source for this article is by Harley Simon, Lovell Tony, (2017), Admiralty War Staff (Royal Navy), dreadnoughtproject.org, http://www.dreadnoughtproject.org.

== Sources ==
- Black, Nicholas (2009). The British Naval Staff in the First World War. Woodbridge: The Boydell Press. ISBN 9781843834427.
- Harley, Simon and Lovell, Tony (2007).The Admiralty War Staff, dreadnoughtproject.org, Harley and Lovell.
- Naval Staff, Training and Staff Duties Division (1929). The Naval Staff of the Admiralty. Its Work and Development. B.R. 1845 (late C.B. 3013). Copy at The National Archives. ADM 234/434.
- "Proposals by Director of Naval Intelligence for carrying out the Duties of a General Staff and Re-organisation of the Naval Intelligence Department." 15 May 1909. The National Archives. ADM 1/8047.
- Rodger. N.A.M., (1979) The Admiralty (offices of state), T. Dalton, Lavenham, ISBN 978-0900963940.
