= George Hope (Royal Navy officer) =

Royal Navy officer (1869–1959)

Admiral Sir George Hope KCB KCMG
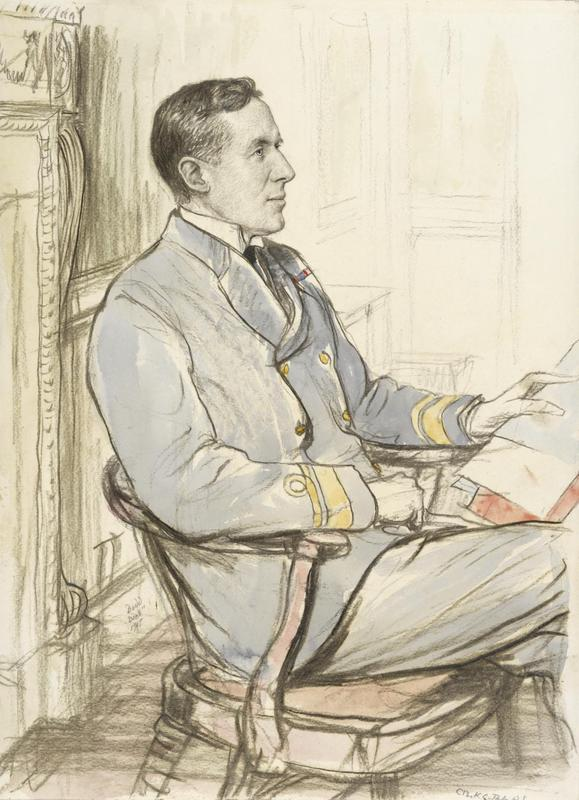
- 1917 portrait of Hope by Francis Dodd
- Born: 11 October 1869
- Died: 11 July 1959 (aged 89)
- Military career
- Allegiance: United Kingdom
- Branch: Royal Navy
- Rank: Admiral
- Commands: HMS Magnificent; HMS Bulwark; HMS Superb; HMS King Alfred; HMS Queen Elizabeth; Royal Naval College, Greenwich
- Conflicts: World War I
- Awards: Knight Commander of the Order of the Bath; Knight Commander of the Order of St Michael and St George

Admiral Sir George Price Webley Hope, KCB, KCMG (11 October 1869 – 11 July 1959) was a Royal Navy officer who served as Deputy First Sea Lord during World War I.

== Naval career ==
Hope joined the Royal Navy. He was specially promoted to lieutenant on 11 October 1889, after one year′s service in the junior grade for obtaining five first-class certificates in his sub-lieutenant′s examination.

He was promoted to commander on 30 June 1900. In July 1902 he was appointed in command of the light cruiser HMS Pioneer, which served in the Mediterranean Fleet. Early the following year Pioneer took part in a three-weeks cruise with other ships of the squadron in the Greek islands around Corfu. While there, she collided with the cruiser HMS Orwell on 30 January 1903, during night exercises near Corfu. Orwell's bow was cut off in the collision with the loss of 15 of her crew. He was subsequently tried by Court Martial on a charge of having negligently or by default hazarded the Pioneer, and was sentenced to be reprimanded and admonished to be more careful in future.

Promoted to captain on 30 June 1905, he was given command of HMS Magnificent in March 1909, HMS Bulwark in March 1910, HMS Superb in April 1913, HMS King Alfred in July 1914 and HMS Queen Elizabeth in October 1914.

Hope served in the First World War. He was appointed Flag Captain to the Commander-in-Chief of the Eastern Mediterranean Squadron, as well as Aide-de-Camp to King George V, in 1915, Director of the Operations Division at the Admiralty in 1916 and Deputy First Sea Lord in 1918.

He was present at the signing of the Armistice with Germany on 11 November 1918. After the War, he was promoted to vice-admiral on 26 November 1920, and became Commander of the 3rd Light Cruiser Squadron. From 1923 he was President of the Royal Naval College, Greenwich. He served as Chairman (1925-1951) of the Society for Nautical Research and its President (1936-1951).

== Family ==
In 1899, he married Arabella Phillippa Sams.

Military offices
Preceded by Sir Herbert Richmond	President, Royal Naval College, Greenwich; 1923–1926	Succeeded by Sir Richard Webb
