= Trade Division (Royal Navy) =

Directorate of the British Admiralty

Agency overview
- Formed: 1914–1928, 1939–1961
- Preceding agency: Naval Intelligence Department
- Superseding agency: Trade and Operations Division
- Jurisdiction: United Kingdom
- Headquarters: Admiralty, London
- Agency executive: Director of Trade Division
- Parent agency: Admiralty Naval Staff

The Trade Division was a Directorate of the British Admiralty, Naval Staff responsible for all matters in relation to U.K. Trade Defence from 1914 until 1928 and then again from 1939 to 1961.

== History ==
Before to 1909 responsibility for Trade Protection lay with the Trade Division that was then part of the Naval Intelligence Department until August 1909 when following restructuring within that department the division was abolished. In February 1913 discussions took place to enquire about the setting up of a Trade Branch as part of the Operations Division of the Admiralty War Staff. Despite recommendations put forward as to its name and remit the First Lord of the Admiralty, Winston Churchill did not agree to its creation until April 1914; he referred to it at this point as the Trade Section In August 1914 the division was formally established as part of the Admiralty War Staff when that department was abolished in May 1917 the division came under the responsibility of the Admiralty Naval Staff. In 1928 the Trade Division was abolished as part of cost savings measures with the Admiralty and its functions were merged with the Plans Division. The Trade Division developed rapidly from very small beginnings to one of the largest organisations within the Naval Staff under its own Assistant Chief of the Naval Staff it first operated until 1928 when it was abolished. However the division was revived again with advent of World War II in May 1939 and continued to operate through the Cold War period until 1961 when it was amalgamated with the Operations Division to form a new Trade and Operations Division (Royal Navy) in 1961.

== Directors duties ==
Included:

- Control all British Merchant Navy movements.
- Direct the execution of arming and equipping of merchant ships during war.
- Liaise with the Assistant Chief of the Naval Staff (Trade Protection).
- Plan and implement defensive measures to protect British Trade.
- Supervise arming and equipping of merchant ships in the event of war.
- Superintend division staff.

== Directors ==
Included:

- Captain Richard Webb: August 1914 – October 1917
- Captain Alan G.Hotham: October 1917 – May 1920
- Captain Charles J, C, Little: May 1920 – May 1922
- Captain David T. Norris May 1922 – April 1924
- Captain Martin Dunbar-Nasmith: April 1924 – January 1926
- Captain Richard A.S. Hill: January 1926 – May 1928

Division suspended from 1928 to 1939

- Captain Maurice J. Mansergh: May 1939 – April 1941
- Captain Brian B. Schofield: April 1941 – January 1943
- Captain Reginald M. Servaes: January–February 1943
- Captain William D. Stephens: July 1943 – July 1945
- Captain Peter Skelton: July 1945 – May 1946
- Captain Thomas L. Bratt: May 1946 – April 1948
- Captain Robert J. O.Otway-Ruthven: April 1948 – May 1950
- Captain Michael B. Laing: May 1950 – June 1952
- Captain George A.F. Norfolk: June 1952 – June 1954
- Captain Robert J. O.Otway-Ruthven: June 1954 – January 1957
- Captain Edmund T. Larken: January 1957 – July 1958
- Captain Charles W. Malins: July 1958 – July 1961

== Deputy directors ==
Included:

- Captain George R.G. Allen: May 1939 – August 1942
- Captain Colin J.L. Bittleston: August 1942 – June 1943
- Captain Francis B. Lloyd: June–December 1943
- Captain Peter Skelton: December 1943 – July 1945

== Timeline ==
- Board of Admiralty, Naval Intelligence Department, Trade Division, (1901–1909).
- Board of Admiralty, Admiralty War Staff, Trade Division, (1914–1917).
- Board of Admiralty, Admiralty Naval Staff, Trade Division, (1917–1928)
- Board of Admiralty, Admiralty Naval Staff, Plans Division, Trade Section, (1928–1939)
- Board of Admiralty, Admiralty Naval Staff, Trade Division, (1939–1961).

== Sources ==
- Black, Nicholas (2009). The British Naval Staff in the First World War. Boydell Press. ISBN 9781843834427.
- Friedman, Norman (2014). Naval Anti-Aircraft Guns and Gunnery. Seaforth Publishing. ISBN 9781473853089.
- Mackie, Colin. (2011). "Royal Navy Senior Appointments from 1865". gulabin.com. Colin Mackie.
- Seligmann, Matthew S. (2012). The Royal Navy and the German Threat 1901-1914: Admiralty Plans to Protect British Trade in a War Against Germany. OUP Oxford. ISBN 9780199574032.
