= Local Defence Division (Royal Navy) =

- Active: 1919-1944
- Country: United Kingdom
- Allegiance: British Empire
- Branch: Royal Navy
- Type: Staff (division)
- Part of: D. C. N. S. (1919—1920); A. C. N. S. (1921—1923); A.C.N.S. (U boat and Trade) (1939—1944)
- Garrison/HQ: Admiralty; Whitehall; London, Great Britain

The Local Defence Division was a division of the British Admiralty Naval Staff. Established in 1919, it continued to operate during the early interwar period until 1923 when it was deactivated. It was reestablished at the beginning of World War Two in 1939 until 1944 when it was abolished. The staff division was administered by the Director Local Defence who reported to the Assistant Chief of the Naval Staff (U boat and Trade) during World War Two.

== History ==
The division was established in 1919 to assess the defence capabilities of naval bases and commercial ports and then prioritising them in order to recommend essential improvements so that necessary work could be carried out. It was in operation until 1923 when it was deactivated. At the beginning of the Second World War it was reactivated and remained in operation until 1944. It was commanded by the Director Local Defence The division was under the Deputy Chief of the Naval Staff from 1919 to 1920, the Assistant Chief of the Naval Staff until 1923. It was then reporting to Assistant Chief of the Naval Staff (U boats and Trade) during World War Two.
