= Laurence Durlacher =

Royal Navy Admiral (1904-1986)

Admiral Sir Laurence Durlacher KCB OBE DSC
- Born: 24 July 1904; Marylebone, London
- Died: 16 January 1986 (aged 81)
- Military career
- Allegiance: United Kingdom
- Branch: Royal Navy
- Rank: Admiral
- Commands: HMS Volage; Signal Division; 3rd Destroyer Flotilla; Commander, Signals and Radar Establishment; Chief of Staff, Eastern Fleet; Deputy Chief of Naval Personnel; 5th Cruiser Squadron; Flag Officer Second in Command Far East Fleet; Deputy Chief of the Naval Staff; Fifth Sea Lord
- Conflicts: World War II
- Awards: Knight Commander of the Order of the Bath; Officer of the Order of the British Empire; Distinguished Service Cross

Admiral Sir Laurence George Durlacher KCB OBE DSC (24 July 1904 – 16 January 1986) was a Royal Navy officer who went on to be Fifth Sea Lord.

== Naval career ==
Durlacher joined the Royal Navy and chose to specialise in signals. He served in World War II initially as Commander of HM Signal School at the Admiralty and then as Fleet Signals Officer on the staff of Admiral Andrew Cunningham during the campaigns in North Africa, Sicily and Italy. He was awarded the Legion of Merit by the US Government for his services in these campaigns and given command of HMS Volage in the Eastern Fleet in 1944.

After the War, having been promoted to captain in 1945, he became deputy director of the Signal Division of the Naval Staff, and in 1949 was appointed Commander of the 3rd Destroyer Flotilla in the Mediterranean Fleet. He went on to be Commander of the Admiralty Signals and Radar Establishment at Haslemere in 1950 and Chief of Staff to the Commander-in-Chief, Eastern Fleet in 1952 before becoming Deputy Chief of Naval Personnel (Personal Services) at the Admiralty in 1955. He was made Flag Officer commanding 5th Cruiser Squadron and Flag Officer Second in Command Far East Fleet in 1957 and then Deputy Chief of the Naval Staff and Fifth Sea Lord in 1959; he retired in 1962.

== Family ==
In 1934 he married Rimma who went on to become a pillar of the British community on the Riviera.

Military offices
Preceded by Sir Manley Power	Fifth Sea Lord; 1959–1962	Succeeded by Sir Peter Gretton
