= Plans Division (Royal Navy) =

Strategic planning arm in British Navy

Division overview
- Formed: 1917
- Preceding Division: Plans Section
- Dissolved: 1964
- Superseding Division: Plans and Resources Division
- Jurisdiction: Government of the United Kingdom
- Headquarters: Admiralty Building Whitehall London
- Division executive: Director Plans; Deputy Director of Plans
- Parent Division: Admiralty War Staff, Admiralty Naval Staff

The Plans Division was the former war preparation and wartime strategic planning arm of the Admiralty Department from 1917 to 1964, The division originally became the main policy advisory and formulating body to the Chief of the Naval Staff. It later came under the supervision of the Assistant-Chief of the Naval staff (Policy).

When it transferred to the Navy Department (Ministry of Defence) it was renamed the Plans and Resources Division until 1971 it then became the Directorate of Naval Plans.

== History ==
The Plans Division was established on 28 September 1917 it evolved out of the earlier Plans Section (Section 16) of the Operations Division of the Naval Staff. Admiral Sir John Jellicoe, First Sea Lord and Chief of Naval Staff whose view was that plans and operations as functions should be separate and distinct. The division existed until 1964 when the Admiralty department was abolished and its functions merged within a new Ministry of Defence and re-emerged as the Plans and Resources Division that was headed by the Director of Plans and Resources.

Responsibilities

The Plans Division would cover a far wider remit than devising the making of operational plans. Long-term policy in regards to the composition of all commands, fleets and squadrons were within its responsibility, continual projecting of naval construction programs were also another duty, however the procedures for planning was always in a constant state of modification due to the significance of changes from one aspect of the war at sea to another.

The business of the plans division was also closely coordinated with that of the Intelligence Division as vital information about the enemy's perceived intentions or actions adversely affected both the preparation of and execution of all plans. This usually consisted of the day-to-day, even hour-to-hour communiques, reports and assessments regarding the actions and movements of every one of the enemy's assets. The scale and complexity was enormous in that it had to cover all the oceans and seas of the world, and that it might affect every British and Allied warships and merchantmen at sea this information in turn passed to the division who had to anticipate and plan contingencies for these types of changes.

Although the division prepared all naval plans the director was also a member of the (Joint Planning Committee) that included the directors of plans from the Army and Air force, they collectively advised the Chiefs of Staff on all inter-Service planning problems. Only a low percentage of plans created received, for one reason or another, the Board of Admiralty's and First Sea Lord's approval; however strategic planning to anticipate every conceivable outcome had to be conducted, because a sudden requirement for an emergency plan might arise, this was particularly the case during both world wars.

== Directors duties ==
As of 1917:

- Preparation of naval plans at home and abroad.
- Consideration of and proposals for the use of new weapons and material.
- Building programmes to cut out approved policy
- Liaise with Director Operations Division before submission of proposals to (C.N.S.) and (D.C.N.S.).

== Directors of Plans ==
Included:

- Rear-Admiral Roger J. B. Keyes, September 1917-January 1918
- Captain Cyril Fuller, January 1918-May 1920
- Captain Barry E. Domvile, May 1920-May 1922
- Captain Arthur Dudley P. R. Pound, May 1922-March 1925
- Captain Wilfrid A. Egerton, March 1925-January 1928
- Captain Roger M. Bellairs, January 1928-December 1930
- Captain John H. D. Cunningham, December 1930-December 1932
- Captain Henry R. Moore, December 1932-November 1933
- Captain Edward L. S. King, November 1933-August 1935
- Captain Tom S. V. Phillips, August 1935-April 1938
- Captain Victor Danckwerts, April 1938–March 1940
- Captain Charles S. Daniel, March 1940-July 1941
- Captain E. Gerald H. Bellars, July 1941-March 1942
- Captain Charles E. Lambe, March 1942-April 1944
- Captain Guy Grantham, April 1944-January 1946
- Captain John F. Stevens, January 1946-January 1948
- Captain Thomas M. Brownrigg, January 1948-January 1950
- Captain R. Dymock Watson, January 1950-April 1952
- Captain Deric Holland-Martin, April 1952-November 1953
- Captain Hector C.D. MacLean, November 1953-January 1956
- Captain E. Duncan G. Lewin, January 1956-December 1957
- Captain Richard M. Smeeton, December 1957-April 1959
- Captain John F. D. Bush, April 1959-November 1960
- Captain Edward B. Ashmore, November 1960-December 1961
- Captain Andrew M. Lewis, December 1961-September 1963
- Captain Peter W. B. Ashmore, September 1963-January 1966

== Deputy Directors of Plans ==
Included:

- Captain Barry E. Domvile, August 1919-May 1920
- Captain Gerald L.C. Dickens, May 1920-June 1922
- Captain John C. Hamilton, June 1922-May 1924
- Captain Wilfrid A. Egerton, May 1924-March 1925
- Captain T. Hugh Binney, April 1925-August 1927
- Captain Stephen D. Tillard, August 1927-May 1928
- Captain G. Frederick B. Edward-Collins, May 1928-December 1929
- Captain John H.D. Cunningham, December 1929-December 1930
- Captain Henry R. Moore, December 1930-December 1932
- Captain Edward L. S. King, December 1932-December 1933
- Captain John H. Godfrey, November 1933-December 1935
- Captain Edward Neville Syfret, December 1935-December 1937
- Captain John H. Edelsten, December 1937-March 1940
- Captain E. Gerald H. Bellars, March 1940-July 1941
- Captain Charles E. Lambe, July 1941-January 1942
- Captain Douglas H. Everett, January 1942-January 1943
- Captain Robert K. Dickson, January 1943-November 1944
- Captain Godfrey A. French, December 1944-July 1946
- Captain Manley L. Power, February–July 1946
- Captain Harold G. Dickinson, June 1946-December 1948
- Captain Peter G. L. Cazalet, July 1946 – 1947
- Captain J. David Luce, December 1948-February 1951
- Captain Arthur R. Pedder, January 1949-February 1950
- Captain Harold S. Hopkins, September 1951-February 1953
- Captain Thomas D. Ross, February 1953-January 1954
- Captain Robert P.S. Grant, January–December 1954
- Captain Charles P. Coke, December 1954-December 1956
- Captain Edward T. Graham, December 1956-December 1958
- Captain Raymond Hart, December 1958-June 1960
- Captain Edward B. Ashmore, June–November 1960
- Captain Anthony T. F. G. Griffin, November 1960-December 1962
- Captain Peter W. B. Ashmore, December 1962-July 1963

== Assistant Directors of Plans ==
Notes:Incomplete list, the division always had two assistant directors this is indicated where appointment dates overlap below they included:

- Captain Kenneth G. B. Dewar, 1917
- Captain Cyril T. M. Fuller, October, 1917 – 1 January 1918
- Captain A. Dudley P. R. Pound, October, 1917 – 10 January 1918
- Captain Alfred F. B. Carpenter, 26 April 1918 – 17 January 1919
- Captain Gerald C. Dickens, 15 March 1920 – 1 May 1920
- Captain George H. D'Oyly Lyon, 29 August 1923 – 27 April 1925
- Captain Francis H. Sandford, 27 April 1925 – 15 February 1926 (died during appointment)
- Captain G. Frederick B. Edward-Collins, 29 August 1927 – 1 May 1928
- Captain Victor Hilary Danckwerts, 14 September 1932 - January 1934
- Captain Charles S. Daniel, 16 March 1936 - January 1938
- Captain George E. Creasy, 30 June 1936 - February 1938
- Captain John W. Cuthbert, 15 June 1942 - June 1944
- Captain Arthur Philip Culmer, 9 May 1955 - January 1957 (Section A)
- Captain John Cecil Cartwright, 9 September 1956 – 1 January 1957 (Section B)

== Subordinate staff sections ==
A more detailed breakdown of the distribution of work allocated within the division to the various staff sections can be seen below.

As of 1917:

Section	Admiralty Room	Responsibility
(A)	(A.D.P.D)	Devise and prepare (all plans of operation both defensive and offensive)
(B)	(A.D.P.D)	Determine (quantity and arrange for the provision of material to carry out plans.)

== Sources ==
- Archives, The National. "Records of Naval Staff Departments", discovery.nationalarchives.gov.uk. National Archives, 1912-1964.
- Black, Nicholas (2009). The British Naval Staff in the First World War. Woodbridge: The Boydell Press. ISBN 9781843834427.
- Houterman, Hans; Koppes, Jeroen. "World War II unit histories & officers, Royal Navy". www.unithistories.com. Houterman and Koppes, 2016.
- Naval Staff, Training and Staff Duties Division (1929). The Naval Staff of the Admiralty. Its Work and Development. B.R. 1845 (late C.B. 3013). Copy at The National Archives. ADM 234/434
- Mackie, Colin, (2010-2014), British Armed Services between 1860 and the present day — Royal Navy - Senior Appointments, http://www.gulabin.com/.
