= Assistant Chief of the Naval Staff (U boat and Trade) =

- Ensign of the Royal Navy
- Admiralty Department
- Member of: Board of Admiralty
- Reports to: Vice Chief of the Naval Staff
- Nominator: First Lord of the Admiralty
- Appointer: Prime Minister; Subject to formal approval by the Queen-in-Council
- Term length: Not fixed (typically 1–3 years)
- Inaugural holder: Rear-Admiral Arthur Power
- Formation: 1940-1945

The Assistant Chief of the Naval Staff (U boat and Trade) was a senior British Royal Navy appointment. The post holder was part of the Admiralty Naval Staff and member of the Board of Admiralty from 1940 to 1945.

== History ==
First created in July 1940 as a new post as part of the redefining of responsibilities of the Assistant Chief of Naval Staff the post holder was a part of the Admiralty Naval Staff and member of the Board of Admiralty. The post holder was responsible for supervising the directors of a number of naval staff divisions specifically the Minesweeping Division and the Trade Division until 1945.

== Office Holders ==
Included:

- Vice-Admiral Henry Ruthven Moore, — (July 1940–October 1941)
- Vice-Admiral Edward King, — (October 1941–December 1942)
- Rear-Admiral John Edelsten, — (December 1942–October 1944)
- Rear-Admiral John Dundas, — (October 1944–March 1945)
- Rear-Admiral John Mansfield, — (March–? 1945)
