= Clement Moody (Royal Navy officer) =

Royal Navy Admiral (1891–1960)

Admiral Sir Clement Moody KCB
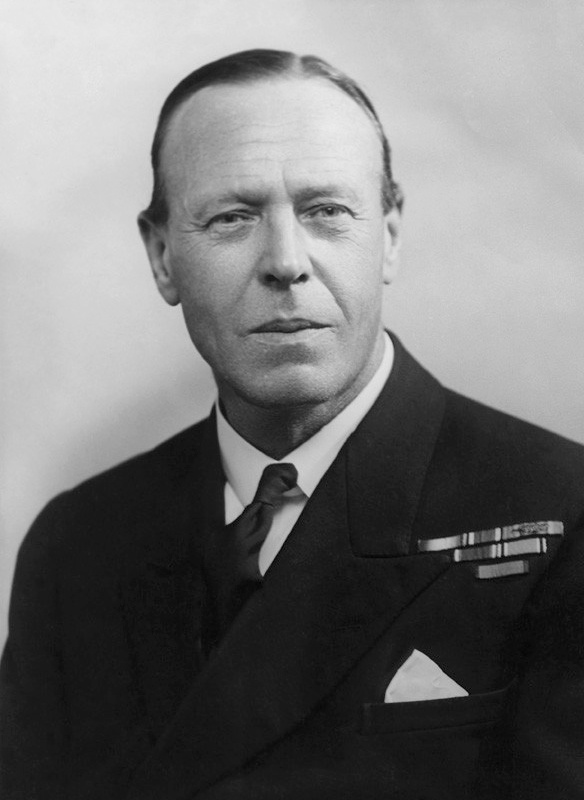
- Rear Admiral Clement Moody in 1941
- Born: 31 May 1891; Frensham, Surrey, England
- Died: 6 July 1960 (aged 69); Fleet, Hampshire, England
- Military career
- Allegiance: United Kingdom
- Branch: Royal Navy
- Service years: 1904–1948
- Rank: Admiral
- Commands: South Atlantic (1946–48); East Indies Fleet (1945–46); Eastern Fleet Aircraft Carriers (1943–44); Home Fleet Aircraft Carriers (1943); Rear Admiral, Naval Air Stations (1941–43); HMS Eagle (1937–39); HMS Curacoa (1934–35)
- Conflicts: First World War; Second World War
- Awards: Knight Commander of the Order of the Bath; Mentioned in Despatches (3)

Admiral Sir Clement Moody, KCB (31 May 1891 – 6 July 1960) was a senior Royal Navy officer who served as Commander-in-Chief, East Indies Fleet, from 1945 to 1946 and Commander-in-Chief, South Atlantic, from 1946 to 1948.

== Family ==
Clement C. Moody was the son of The Rev. William Herbert Moody (d. 5 May 1916), who was vicar of Frensham, Surrey, from 1888 to 1908, and of Bentley, Hampshire, from 1908 until his death in 1916.

He was the brother of Captain Ambrose Moody (30 January 1893 – 21 August 1915), of the 5th Battalion The Dorset Regiment, who was lost missing in action at the Dardanelles.

He was the father of Fleet Air Arm officer and Quaker peace activist Richard Moody.

== Naval career ==
Moody was appointed a sub-lieutenant in the Royal Navy in 1911. He served in the First World War and, in 1935, was given command of HMS Curacoa. He commanded the aircraft carrier HMS Eagle from 1937.

Moody served in the Second World War as Director of the Naval Air Division and then as second-in-command of Naval Air Stations in 1941. He was made second-in-command of Aircraft Carriers in Home Waters in 1943; in April 1944 he took part in Operation Cockpit, a bombing raid on Japanese port and oil facilities on Sabang Island (off the northern tip of Sumatra).

Moody went on to be Commander-in-Chief, East Indies Fleet, from 15 December 1945 to 8 March 1946. His last appointment was as Commander-in-Chief, South Atlantic in 1946, as which he served until his retirement in 1948.

Military offices
Preceded by Sir Arthur Power	Commander-in-Chief, East Indies Fleet; 1945–1946	Succeeded by Sir Denis Boyd
Preceded by Sir Robert Burnett	Commander-in-Chief, South Atlantic; 1946–1948	Succeeded by Sir Desmond McCarthy
