= Naval Historical Branch =

Branch of the UK Royal Navy

Agency overview
- Formed: 1912-current
- Preceding agency: Admiralty Library
- Jurisdiction: Government of the United Kingdom
- Headquarters: HMNB Portsmouth
- Agency executive: Head of Naval Historical Branch and Naval Historical Library
- Parent agency: Office of the Assistant-Chief of the Naval Staff (Policy)

The Naval Historical Branch originally known as the Historical Section is the branch responsible for managing the Royal Navy's historical archives, it was established in 1912 and exists today. It is currently superintended by the Head of Naval Historical Branch and Naval Historical Library he reports to the Assistant-Chief of the Naval Staff (Policy).

== History ==
The Historical Section was established after the First World War as part of the Training and Staff Duties Division of the Admiralty Naval Staff. Between 1919 and 1939 it produced a number of confidential historical monographs on the naval war and a history of the Naval Staff itself. During the Second World War it produced hundreds of reports, including immediate Battle Summaries, which allowed rapid improvements in the Royal Navy's effectiveness. After the war, these were developed into authoritative histories which incorporated captured German materials and are used extensively with the defence community.

The Naval Historical Branch, as it is now named, continues to provide information and advice across defence in order to improve policy decisions. It does so by supplying a historical perspective and by countering any misconceptions that may have arisen without evidence. Recent work includes papers concerning the debate on effects based warfare and the maritime contribution to dealing with terrorists. This work is complemented by the longer-term analysis of new classified staff histories. Histories in progress include an innovative Four-Nation study of maritime co-operation since the 1990-1991 Gulf War, initiated by the chiefs of Naval Staff in Britain, the United States, Canada and Australia. The Branch also works with the fleet headquarters providing war diarist support and historically based training for naval and joint units. Recent examples include the naval war diaries for Operation Telic and a study of the Normandy landings for the Royal Navy's Fleet Battle Staff. The Naval Historical Branch works in partnership with Fleet Headquarters in order to ensure records of the Royal Navy's wide range of activities are produced, preserved and organized, so that their content is permanently accessible. This is vital for the Branch's main business but is also central to legal and compensation issues. These are an increasing aspect of the Branch's work and have considerable financial implications. While the Branch does not adjudicate any cases, it does provide an expert input, which both assists the early resolution of legitimate claims and helps challenge any which may be more doubtful. As a former First Sea Lord, Admiral Lord West, put it: "To those who are sceptical about the cost of this historical input, the loss of just one legal case because of lack of written documents would pay for the Branch …"

== Heads of Naval Historical Branch and Naval Historical Library ==
Incomplete list:

- Rear-Admiral Peter Noel Buckley: CB. DSO.(retd), 1968-1975

== Attribution ==
This article contains text from this source https://www.gov.uk/government/Chronology of the historical branches of the 3 services, which is available under the Open Government Licence v3.0. © Crown copyright.

== Sources ==
- United Kingdom Government, Ministry of Defence, Army Secretariat, Army Headquarters (2012), "A chronology of the historical branches of the 3 services" Naval Historical Branch, pp. 2–3, //www.gov.uk/government/uploads/system/uploads/attachment_data/file/389352/20141216-FOI07994_Historical_Branches_ArmySec_Redacted.pdf.
