= Arthur Seymour Bolt =

Royal Navy Rear Admiral (1907–1994)

Rear Admiral Arthur Seymour Bolt CB DSO DSC & Bar
- Born: 1907
- Died: 1994 (aged 86–87)
- Military career
- Allegiance: United Kingdom
- Branch: Royal Navy
- Service years: 1923–1960
- Rank: Rear Admiral
- Nickname: Ben Bolt
- Commands: HMS Theseus; RNAS St Merryn; 812 Naval Air Squadron
- Conflicts: Second World War; Korean War
- Awards: Companion of the Order of the Bath; Distinguished Service Order; Distinguished Service Cross and Bar

Rear Admiral Arthur Seymour Bolt, CB DSO DSC & Bar (1907–1994), kown as Ben Bolt, was a Royal Navy officer whose career included service in the Fleet Air Arm, work on airborne magnetic-mine detection during the Second World War and command of the aircraft carrier HMS Theseus during the Korean War. He later held senior appointments in the Admiralty and the Ministry of Supply, including Director of Naval Air Warfare and Deputy Controller of Military Aircraft.

== Early life and naval career ==
Bolt was born in 1907. He was educated at the Nautical College, Pangbourne, Berkshire and the Royal Naval College, Dartmouth, Devon, and joined the Royal Navy in 1923. He was promoted to lieutenant in 1929 and qualified as an aircrew observer in 1931. During the 1930s he served aboard the aircraft carriers HMS Glorious and HMS Furious.

=== Second World War ===
In June 1939 Bolt was appointed to command 812 Naval Air Squadron. The squadron operated Fairey Swordfish torpedo bombers and was embarked in HMS Glorious, in the Mediterranean. After the aircraft carrier returned to the United Kingdom in 1940, the squadron transferred to No. 16 Group of RAF Coastal Command and undertook minelaying and bombing operations in coastal areas of the Netherlands, Belgium and France.

=== Airborne magnetic-mine detection ===
During the early part of the war Bolt became involved in the development and operational testing of an airborne method of detecting magnetic mines. The system, known as Directional Wireless Installation (DWI), used an electrically energised coil carried by an aircraft to detonate mines through the magnetic field it generated. The equipment was originally intended for Fleet Air Arm aircraft but was eventually fitted to Vickers Wellington aircraft of RAF Coastal Command. Fleet Air Arm observers navigated the aircraft during the experimental phase.

Bolt advocated the use of aircraft for this purpose and took part in the early trials. On 8 January 1940 he was the navigator aboard Wellington P2518 during the first successful operational DWI trial. The crew included the test pilot, known as “Bruin” Purvis, and Squadron Leader John Chaplin, who operated the equipment. Notably it was the first mine was destroyed by a DWI aircraft.

Bolt subsequently served with No. 1 General Reconnaissance Unit, an RAF formation which operated DWI-equipped Wellington aircraft. The unit was formed at RAF Manston, Kent, in December 1939 and moved to Egypt in May 1940.

=== Mediterranean service ===
By October 1940 Bolt was serving aboard the battleship HMS Warspite as staff observer to the Commander-in-Chief Mediterranean, now a Lieutenant-Commander.

At the Battle of Cape Matapan on 28 March 1941, the ship's catapult aircraft, with Bolt aboard, was recovered after an initial flight and relaunched later in the day. In his despatch on the battle, Admiral Sir Andrew Cunningham praised Bolt's report for providing an accurate picture of the Italian fleet and described it as being of the utmost value.

Bolt received the Distinguished Service Cross in March 1940 for gallantry and devotion to duty in a hazardous air operation. He was awarded a Bar to the decoration in July 1941 for his service at the Battle of Cape Matapan.

=== Admiralty appointments ===
Bolt served in the Naval Air Department at the Admiralty from 1942 to 1945. In October 1944 he became Deputy Director of Naval Air Radio, serving at the Admiralty establishment HMS President and through to 1945 this role was in support of Captain B.R. Willett, Director of Naval Air Radio.

=== Post-war service ===
In 1946 Bolt became second-in-command of the Town-class light cruiser HMS Belfast, serving in the Far East. HMS Belfast returned to Portsmouth on 15 October 1947. Bolt was promoted to captain in 1947.

From 1947 to 1949 Bolt commanded the Royal Naval Air Station at St Merryn in Cornwall. RNAS St Merryn was the home of the School of Naval Air Warfare. The school taught tactical methods to experienced Fleet Air Arm pilots, with instruction divided into fighter combat, ground attack and airstrike training.

=== Korean War ===
In 1949 Bolt took command of the Colossus-class light fleet aircraft carrier HMS Theseus. The ship deployed to the Korean War in 1950 with the 17th Carrier Air Group. HMS Theseus arrived at Sasebo on 5 October 1950 carrying 807 Naval Air Squadron, equipped with 21 Hawker Sea Furies, and 810 Naval Air Squadron, equipped with 12 Fairey Fireflies.

During April 1951, HMS Theseus operated alongside the United States Navy's aircraft light aircraft carrier USS Bataan. In his report on the joint operations, Bolt drew attention to the vulnerability of carriers when replenishing at sea while maintaining a steady course and speed. The official naval history also records his description of the effect of helicopter rescues on aircrew morale as "outstanding".

Between 8 October 1950 and 19 April 1951, aircraft operating from HMS Theseus flew 3,446 sorties over 86 operating days. The figure was reported to Parliament in May 1951 and recorded in the official naval history.

Bolt delivered a lecture to the Royal United Services Institute (RUSI) in October 1951 on HMS Theseus in the Korean War and the wider problems of naval aviation in that theatre. The lecture was subsequently published in the Journal of the Royal United Service Institution. In his discussion of carrier operations, Bolt argued that a carrier operating alone had to maintain a high operational intensity or risk devoting its effort to self-protection.

Bolt was appointed a Companion of the Distinguished Service Order in June 1951 for distinguished service in operations in Korean waters.

=== Senior appointments ===
In June 1951 Bolt became Director of Naval Air Warfare at the Admiralty, a post he held until 1953. During this appointment, his recorded policy minutes addressed the priority given to Royal Air Force aircraft requirements over naval aviation and the Royal Navy's shortage of naval air strength. In a November 1951 minute he argued that naval aircraft requirements were liable to be subordinated to those of the RAF; in September 1952 he stated that the Royal Navy lacked sufficient naval air strength to meet even vital commitments and would have to rely on the United States Navy.

In 1954 Bolt became Chief of Staff to the Flag Officer Air (Home), based at RNAS Lee-on-Solent, (HMS Daedalus), Hampshire. He was promoted to rear-admiral in 1956 and was a member of the Maritime Air Committee that year.

In 1957 Bolt became Deputy Controller of Military Aircraft at the Ministry of Supply, the organisation responsible for coordinating naval aircraft development. The Director of Royal Naval Aircraft Research and Development reported to the Deputy Controller for Military Aircraft. The department's role was to ensure that aircraft developed by manufacturers met Admiralty requirements.

Bolt was appointed a Companion of the Order of the Bath in the 1958 Birthday Honours. He retired from the Royal Navy in 1960.
