= Admiralty Naval Staff =

Department in the British Admiralty

Department overview
- Formed: 1917
- Preceding Department: Admiralty War Staff
- Dissolved: 1964
- Superseding Department: Ministry of Defence (Naval Staff)
- Jurisdiction: Government of the United Kingdom
- Headquarters: Admiralty Building; Whitehall; London
- Department executives: First Sea Lord and Chief of the Naval Staff; Deputy First Sea Lord; Deputy Chief of the Naval Staff; Vice Chief of the Naval Staff; Assistant Chief of the Naval Staff
- Parent department: Admiralty
- Child Department: Air Division Anti-Submarine Division Gunnery and Torpedo Division Historical Section Mercantile Movements Division Mobilisation Division Naval Intelligence Division Operations Division Plans Division Signal Division Trade Division

The Admiralty Naval Staff was the former senior command, operational planning, policy and strategy department within the British Admiralty. It was established in 1917 and existed until 1964 when the department of the Admiralty was abolished. It was replaced by the Ministry of Defence (Naval Staff) as part of the Ministry of Defence Navy Department.

== History and development ==
In December 1916, Admiral Sir John Jellicoe was appointed Admiral of the Fleet and First Sea Lord he would oversee the expansion of the Naval Staff at the Admiralty and the introduction of convoys. In April 1917, the Admiralty War Staff function was abolished and replaced by a new Admiralty Naval Staff department and Jellicoe was also given the additional title of Chief of the Naval Staff. He was assisted initially by two deputies, the Deputy Chief of the Naval Staff and the Assistant Chief of the Naval Staff, these would be joined later by the Deputy First Sea Lord and Vice Chief of the Naval Staff, Jellicoe was relieved at the end of 1917. Changes in the structure of the Staff were implemented from 1918 onward during the interwar period some of the divisions were wound down in peace time but would be re-established with the advent of the Second World War. After the war the divisions were once again downsized.

== Duties ==
The term 'Naval Staff' does not mean all Naval Officers serving in the former Admiralty Department, it means the divisions that are responsible under the Office of the Chief of Naval Staff and including his deputy, vice and assistant chiefs of the staff for the formulation of naval strategy including strategic planning, conduct of operations, implementation of naval policy, application of tactical doctrines, the collection and dissemination of intelligence and for stating the broad naval requirements, including the quantities and specification of ships, naval aircraft, armament and equipment the Naval Staff also included some civilian members.

== Admiralty departments ==
The admiralty divisions should be not confused with its departments which were distinct and separate from the function of the naval staff in that they were superintended by the offices of the various Sea Lords responsible for them and were primarily administrative and logistical support bodies.

== Members of the naval staff ==
Board of Admiralty member (*)

- First Sea Lord and Chief of the Naval Staff *
- Deputy First Sea Lord *
- Deputy Chief of the Naval Staff *
- Vice Chief of the Naval Staff *
- Assistant Chief of the Naval Staff *
- Assistant Chief of the Naval Staff (Air)
- Assistant Chief of the Naval Staff (Foreign)
- Assistant Chief of the Naval Staff (Home)
- Assistant Chief of the Naval Staff (Operations)
- Assistant Chief of the Naval Staff (Policy)
- Assistant Chief of Naval Staff (Submarines)
- Assistant Chief of the Naval Staff
- Assistant Chief of the Naval Staff (Warfare)
- Assistant Chief of the Naval Staff (U boat and Trade)
- Assistant Chief of the Naval Staff (Weapons)

== Structure of the naval staff ==
=== May 1917 ===
The Naval Staff was organised by Admiral of the Fleet Sir John Jellicoe as follows:

- (United Kingdom) First Sea Lord and Chief of Naval Staff
  - (United Kingdom) Deputy Chief of the Naval Staff
    - Intelligence Division
    - Mobilisation Division
    - Operations Division
    - Signal Division
  - (United Kingdom) Assistant Chief of the Naval Staff
    - Anti-Submarine Division
    - Convoy Section
    - Minesweeping Division
    - Trade Division

=== June 1917 ===
The Naval Staff was organised as follows:

- (United Kingdom) First Sea Lord and Chief of Naval Staff
  - (United Kingdom) Deputy Chief of the Naval Staff
    - Intelligence Division
    - Mobilisation Division
    - Operations Division
    - Signal Division
  - (United Kingdom) Assistant Chief of the Naval Staff
    - Anti-Submarine Division
    - Minesweeping Division
    - Trade Division

=== December 1917 ===
The Naval Staff was organised as follows:

- (United Kingdom) First Sea Lord and Chief of Naval Staff
  - (United Kingdom) Deputy Chief of the Naval Staff
    - Operations Division
    - Plans Division
    - Signal Division
  - (United Kingdom) Assistant Chief of the Naval Staff
    - Anti-Submarine Division
    - Mercantile Movements Division
    - Minesweeping Division
    - Mobilisation Division
    - Trade Division
  - (United Kingdom) Deputy First Sea Lord
    - Training Division

=== 1918 to 1919 ===
The Naval Staff was re-organised under Admiral of the Fleet Sir Rosslyn Wemyss as follows:

- (United Kingdom) First Sea Lord and Chief of Naval Staff
    - Intelligence Division
    - Gunnery and Torpedo Division
    - Training and Staff Duties Division
  - (United Kingdom) Deputy Chief of the Naval Staff (Home Waters Operations)
    - Air Division
    - Operations Division (Home)
    - Plans Division
    - Signal Division
  - (United Kingdom) Assistant Chief of the Naval Staff (Trade Protection Operations)
    - Anti-Submarine Division
    - Mercantile Movements Division
    - Minesweeping Division
    - Trade Division
  - (United Kingdom) Deputy First Sea Lord (Policy and Overseas Operations)
    - Operations Division (Foreign)

=== 1920 ===
The Naval Staff was re-organised under Admiral of the Fleet Sir David Beatty, as follows:

- (United Kingdom) First Sea Lord and Chief of Naval Staff
  - Intelligence Division
  - Gunnery and Torpedo Division
  - Training and Staff Duties Division
  - (United Kingdom) Deputy Chief of the Naval Staff (Home Waters)
    - Air Division
    - Operations Division (Home)
    - Plans Division
    - Local Defence Division
  - (United Kingdom) Assistant Chief of the Naval Staff (Trade Protection)
    - Anti-Submarine Division
    - Mercantile Movements Division
    - Minesweeping Division
    - Trade Division
  - (United Kingdom) Deputy First Sea Lord (Policy and Overseas)
    - Operations Division (Foreign)

=== 1921 to 1926 ===
The Naval Staff was re-organised during the early inter-war years, and the post Deputy First Sea Lord was abolished:

- (United Kingdom) First Sea Lord and Chief of Naval Staff
  - Intelligence Division
  - Gunnery Division
  - Torpedo Division
  - Training and Staff Duties Division
  - (United Kingdom) Deputy Chief of the Naval Staff
    - Communications Division
    - Operations Division
    - Plans Division
  - (United Kingdom) Assistant Chief of the Naval Staff
    - Air Division
    - Trade Division
    - Local Defence Division

=== 1927 to 1929 ===
Admiral of the Fleet Sir Charles Madden, 1st Baronet re-structured the Naval Staff as follows:

- (United Kingdom) First Sea Lord and Chief of Naval Staff
  - (United Kingdom) Deputy Chief of the Naval Staff
    - Intelligence Division
    - Operations Division
    - Plans Division (including local defence)
    - Trade Division
  - (United Kingdom) Assistant Chief of the Naval Staff
    - Air Division
    - Gunnery Division
    - Tactical Division
    - Torpedo Division
    - Training and Staff Duties Division

=== 1932 ===
Admiral of the Fleet Sir Frederick Field organised the Naval Staff as follows:

- (United Kingdom) First Sea Lord and Chief of Naval Staff
  - (United Kingdom) Deputy Chief of the Naval Staff (Policy)
    - Air Division
    - Intelligence Division
    - Operations Division
    - Plans Division
    - Tactical Division
    - Trade Division
    - Training and Staff Duties Division

=== 1935 ===
Admiral of the Fleet Sir Ernle Chatfield kept the Naval Staff as follows:

- (United Kingdom) First Sea Lord and Chief of Naval Staff
  - (United Kingdom) Deputy Chief of the Naval Staff (Policy)
    - Assistant Chief of the Naval Staff
      - Air Division
      - Intelligence Division
      - Operations Division
      - Plans Division
      - Tactical Division
      - Trade Division
      - Training and Staff Duties Division

=== 1941 ===
Admiral of the Fleet Sir Dudley Pound re-organised, the Naval Staff as follows:

- (United Kingdom) First Sea Lord and Chief of Naval Staff
  - (United Kingdom) Vice Chief of the Naval Staff
    - Intelligence Division
    - Plans Division
    - Signals Division
    - (United Kingdom) Assistant Chief of the Naval Staff (Home)
      - Anti-Submarine and Warfare Division
      - Local Defence Division
      - Operations Division (Home)
      - Operations Division (Mining)
      - Training and Staff Duties Division
    - (United Kingdom) Assistant Chief of the Naval Staff (Foreign)
      - Gunnery Division (Foreign)
      - Operations Division (Foreign)
      - Economic Warfare Division
    - (United Kingdom) Assistant Chief of the Naval Staff (U boat and Trade)
      - Minesweeping Division
      - Trade Division

=== 1945 ===
Admiral of the Fleet Sir Andrew Cunningham re-organised the Naval Staff, as follows:

- (United Kingdom) First Sea Lord and Chief of Naval Staff
  - Deputy First Sea Lord (Policy)
    - (United Kingdom) Vice Chief of the Naval Staff
      - Intelligence Division
      - Plans Division
      - Plans Division (Q)
      - Signals Division
      - (United Kingdom) Assistant Chief of the Naval Staff (Home)
        - Anti-U Boat Division
        - Local Defence Division
        - Operations Division (Home)
        - Operations Division (Mining)
        - Training and Staff Duties Division
      - (United Kingdom) Assistant Chief of the Naval Staff (Foreign)
        - Operations Division (Foreign)
        - Economic Warfare Division
      - (United Kingdom) Assistant Chief of the Naval Staff (Weapons)
        - Gunnery Division
      - (United Kingdom) Assistant Chief of the Naval Staff (U Boat and Trade)
        - Minesweeping Division
        - Trade Division

=== 1951 ===
Admiral of the Fleet Sir Bruce Fraser re-organised the Naval Staff, as follows:

- (United Kingdom) First Sea Lord and Chief of Naval Staff
  - (United Kingdom) Vice Chief of the Naval Staff
    - (United Kingdom) Deputy Chief of the Naval Staff
      - Assistant Chief of the Naval Staff
        - Naval Air Organisation and Training Division
        - Intelligence Division
        - Operations Division
        - Plans Division
        - Plans Division (Q)
        - Standardisation Division
        - Tactical and Staff Duties Division
        - Trade Division
      - Assistant Chief of the Naval Staff, Warfare
        - Gunnery and Anti-Aircraft Warfare Division
        - Naval Air Warfare Division
        - Torpedo, Anti-Submarine and Minewarfare Division

=== 1956 ===
Admiral of the Fleet Louis Mountbatten, 1st Earl Mountbatten of Burma, re-organised the Naval Staff, as follows:

- (United Kingdom) First Sea Lord and Chief of Naval Staff
  - (United Kingdom) Vice Chief of the Naval Staff
    - (United Kingdom) Deputy Chief of the Naval Staff
      - Assistant Chief of the Naval Staff
        - Administrative Planning Department
        - Naval Air Organisation and Training Division
        - Naval Intelligence Division
        - Operations Division
        - Plans Division
      - Assistant Chief of the Naval Staff, Warfare
        - Gunnery Division
        - Naval Air Warfare Division
        - Signal Division
        - Tactical Ship Requirements and Staff Duties Division
        - Trade Division
        - Under-surface Warfare Division

=== 1958 ===
Admiral of the Fleet Louis Mountbatten, 1st Earl Mountbatten of Burma, re-organised the Naval Staff, as follows:

- (United Kingdom) First Sea Lord and Chief of Naval Staff
  - (United Kingdom) Vice Chief of the Naval Staff
    - (United Kingdom) Deputy Chief of the Naval Staff
      - Assistant Chief of the Naval Staff
        - Administrative Planning Department
        - Naval Air Organisation and Training Division
        - Naval Intelligence Division
        - Operations Division
        - Plans Division
      - Assistant Chief of the Naval Staff, Warfare
        - Navigation and Direction Division
        - Signal Division
        - Tactical Ship Requirements and Staff Duties Division
        - Trade Division
        - Under-surface Warfare Division

=== 1962 ===
Admiral of the Fleet Sir Caspar John, First Sea Lord and Chief of Naval Staff re-organised the Naval Staff, as follows:

- (United Kingdom) First Sea Lord and Chief of Naval Staff
  - (United Kingdom) Vice Chief of the Naval Staff
    - (United Kingdom) Deputy Chief of the Naval Staff
      - Assistant Chief of the Naval Staff
        - Administrative Planning Division
        - Naval Intelligence Division
        - Plans Division
        - Tactical and Weapons Policy Division
      - Assistant Chief of the Naval Staff, Warfare
        - Gunnery Division
        - Naval Air Division
        - Navigation and Direction Division
        - Signal Division
        - Trade and Operations Division
        - Under-surface Warfare Division

=== 1964 ===
Admiral Sir David Luce as First Sea Lord and Chief of Naval Staff organised the Naval Staff in July 1964 as follows:

- (United Kingdom) First Sea Lord and Chief of Naval Staff
  - (United Kingdom) Deputy Chief of the Naval Staff
    - (United Kingdom) Assistant Chief of the Naval Staff
        - Gunnery Division
        - Naval Air Division
        - Navigation and Direction Division
        - Plans Division
        - Signal Division
        - Tactical and Weapons Policy Division
        - Trade and Operations Division
        - Under-surface Warfare Division

== Post 1964 ==
Following the merger within the Ministry of Defence until 1971 former naval staff divisions were renamed as directorates as well as new ones being established for specific purposes some other notable changes during this period included the commandant general, and the hydrographer of the navy now as part of the naval staff as follows:

1. Defence Intelligence – (former naval intelligence division)
2. Directorate of Naval Plans – (former plans division)
3. Directorate of Defence Plans (Navy) – (new directorate as part of MOD)
4. Directorate of Naval Administrative Planning – (former administrative planning division)
5. Directorate of Naval Air Warfare – (former naval air division)
6. Directorate of Naval Operations and Trade – (former operations and trade division)
7. Directorate of Naval Signals – (former signals division)
8. Directorate of Naval Tactical and Weapons Policy – (former tactical and weapons policy division)
9. Directorate of Operational Analysis (RN) – (new directorate)
10. Directorate of Surface Warfare (Naval) – (new directorate)
11. Directorate of Under Sea Warfare (Naval) – (former under sea warfare division)
12. Directorate of Navigation and Tactical Control (Naval) – (former navigation and direction division)

== See also ==
- Staff (military)

== Attribution ==
Primary source for this article is by Harley Simon, Lovell Tony, (2014), Naval Staff (Royal Navy), dreadnoughtproject.org, http://www.dreadnoughtproject.org.

== Sources ==
- Black, Nicholas (2009). The British Naval Staff in the First World War. Woodbridge: The Boydell Press. ISBN 9781843834427.
- "Proposals by Director of Naval Intelligence for carrying out the Duties of a General Staff and Re-organisation of the Naval Intelligence Department." 15 May 1909. The National Archives. ADM 1/8047.
- Naval Staff, Training and Staff Duties Division (1929). The Naval Staff of the Admiralty. Its Work and Development. B.R. 1845 (late C.B. 3013). Copy at The National Archives. ADM 234/434
- Rodger. N.A.M., (1979) The Admiralty (offices of state), T. Dalton, Lavenham, ISBN 978-0900963940.
- Smith, Gordon (2014), British Admiralty, Part 2 - Changes in Admiralty Departments 1913-1920, Naval-History.Net.
- Stationery Office, H.M. (1935). The Navy List. Sprink and Sons Ltd, London, England. pp. 414–415.
- Stationery Office, H.M. (1951). The Navy List. Spink and Son Ltd, London, England. pp. 326–327.
- Stationery Office, H.M. (1956). The Navy List. Spink and Son Ltd, London, England. pp. 1239–1241.
- Stationery Office, H.M. (1958). The Navy List. Spink and Son Ltd, London, England. pp. 1227–1229.
- Stationery Office, H.M. (1962). The Navy List. Spink and Son Ltd, London, England. pp. 906–908.
