= Directorate of Navigation and Tactical Control (Naval) =

British Royal Navy, naval staff

- Active: 1912-1968
- Country: United Kingdom
- Allegiance: British Empire
- Branch: Royal Navy
- Type: Naval station
- Part of: Admiralty Naval Staff (1912—1964); Navy Department (Ministry of Defence) (1964—1968)
- Garrison/HQ: Admiralty, then MOD Whitehall London Great Britain

The Directorate of Navigation and Tactical Control (Naval) was a directorate of the Navy Department, Naval Staff first established in 1912, as the Navigation Department of Hydrographic Department of the Admiralty. In 1945, it was renamed the Navigation Division and assigned to the Admiralty Naval Staff. In 1946, it was redesignated Navigation and Direction Division until 1966, and now part of the Navy Department Naval Staff it was renamed the Directorate of Navigation and Tactical Control (Naval). The staff directorate was administered by the Director Navigation Tactical Control (Naval) who reported to the Assistant Chief of the Naval Staff (Warfare) it existed until 1968.

== History ==
The directorate was originally established in December 1912, as the Navigation Department of the Admiralty, then part of the department of the Hydrographer of the Navy. Following changes in the command structure of the Admiralty Naval Staff (1917–1919) the department and thus Director of Navigation came under direct control of the First Sea Lord until 1945. In July the Navigation Department was renamed the Navigation Division and now as part of the Naval Staff. In 1946, it was renamed the Navigation and Direction Division. The division existed as part of the Admiralty Naval Staff until April 1964, when the Admiralty was combined to created single new Ministry of Defence it continued following the merger as part of the Naval Staff, Navy Department until 1966, when it was renamed the Directorate of Navigation and Tactical Control (Naval) In June 1968, the Directorate was abolished.

== Head of department/division/directorate ==
=== Director of Navigation Department ===
Included:

1. Captain Philip Nelson-Ward: December 1912–August 1916
2. Captain John A. Webster: August 1916–August 1919
3. Captain John E.T.Harper: August 1919–November 1921
4. Captain Frederick P.Loder Symonds: November 1921–November 1923
5. Captain the Hon.Arthur C.Strutt: November 1923–November 1925
6. Captain Alfred H.Norman: November 1925–November 1927
7. Captain Oswald H. Dawson: November 1927–January 1930
8. Captain Kenelm E. L. Creighton: January 1930–December 1931
9. Captain James D. Campbell: December 1931–September 1933
10. Captain John W.Clayton: September 1933–September 1935
11. Captain William G. Benn: September 1935–June 1938
12. Captain Charles E. Morgan: June 1938–October 1940
13. Captain Ronald G. Bowes-Lyon: October 1940–June 1942
14. Rear-Admiral William G. Benn: June 1942 – 1944 (continued till December 1945 as Head of Navigation Division)

=== Director of Navigation Division ===
Included:

1. Rear-Admiral William G. Benn: 1944–December 1945
2. Captain Richard W. Ravenhill: December 1945–December 1947

=== Director of Navigation and Direction Division ===
Included:

1. Captain Richard W. Ravenhill: 1946–December 1947
2. Captain Francis B. Lloyd: December 1947–December 1949
3. Captain Wilfred G. Brittain: December 1949–December 1951
4. Captain Earle H. Thomas: December 1951–January 1954
5. Captain Maurice E. Butler-Bowden: January 1954–December 1956
6. Captain John E. Jowitt: December 1956–October 1958
7. Captain Donald McEwen: October 1958–January 1961
8. Captain Colin D. Madden: January 1961–March 1962
9. Captain John W.H. Bennett: March 1962–June 1964
10. Captain David N. Forbes: June 1964–December 1965
11. Captain John S. Le Blanc Smith: December 1965 – 1966

=== Director of Navigation and Tactical Control (Naval) ===
Included:

1. Captain John S. Le-Blanc Smith: 1966–1968
