= Economic Warfare Division (Royal Navy) =

- Active: 1939-1945
- Country: United Kingdom
- Allegiance: British Empire
- Branch: Royal Navy
- Type: Staff (division)
- Part of: Admiralty Naval Staff (1939—1945)
- Garrison/HQ: Admiralty; Whitehall; London, Great Britain

The Economic Warfare Division (E.W.D.) was a division of the Admiralty Naval Staff established during World War II. It was in operation from September 1939 to July 1945. The staff division was administered by the Director of Economic Warfare Division.

== History ==
The division was first established in 1939 its responsibilities involved formulating strategies in relation to Economic Warfare and devising plans in order to implement effective economic blockading of Germany. The division worked in liaison with the Ministry of Economic Warfare. It was in operation throughout the second world war and by 1946 it was abolished. The division was administered by the Director Economic Warfare.

== Directors of Economic Warfare Division ==
Included:

- Captain O. E. Halifax, 1 September 1939 - October 1944.
