= Alexander Duff (Royal Navy officer) =

Royal Navy Admiral (1862–1933)

Admiral Sir Alexander Duff GCB GBE KCVO
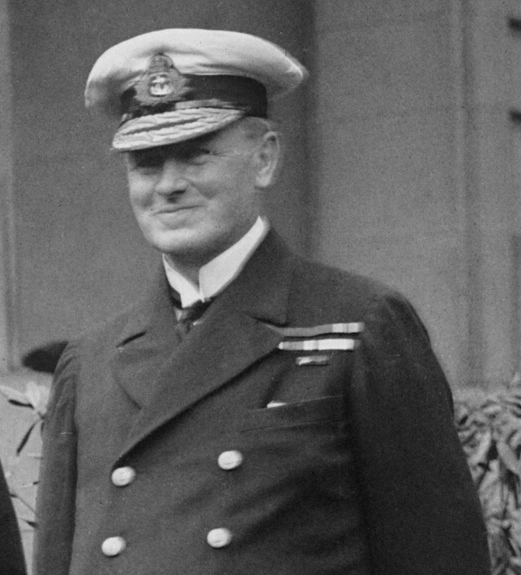
- Born: 20 February 1862; Knockleith, Aberdeenshire
- Died: 22 November 1933 (aged 71); London, United Kingdom
- Military career
- Allegiance: United Kingdom
- Branch: Royal Navy
- Service years: 1875–1925
- Rank: Admiral
- Commands: China Station
- Conflicts: World War I
- Awards: Knight Grand Cross of the Order of the Bath; Knight Grand Cross of the Order of the British Empire Knight Commander of the Royal Victorian Order; Legion of Honour, Commander; Distinguished Service Medal (United States)

Admiral Sir Alexander Ludovic Duff (20 February 1862 – 22 November 1933) was a Royal Navy officer who served as Commander-in-Chief, China Station.

== Naval career ==
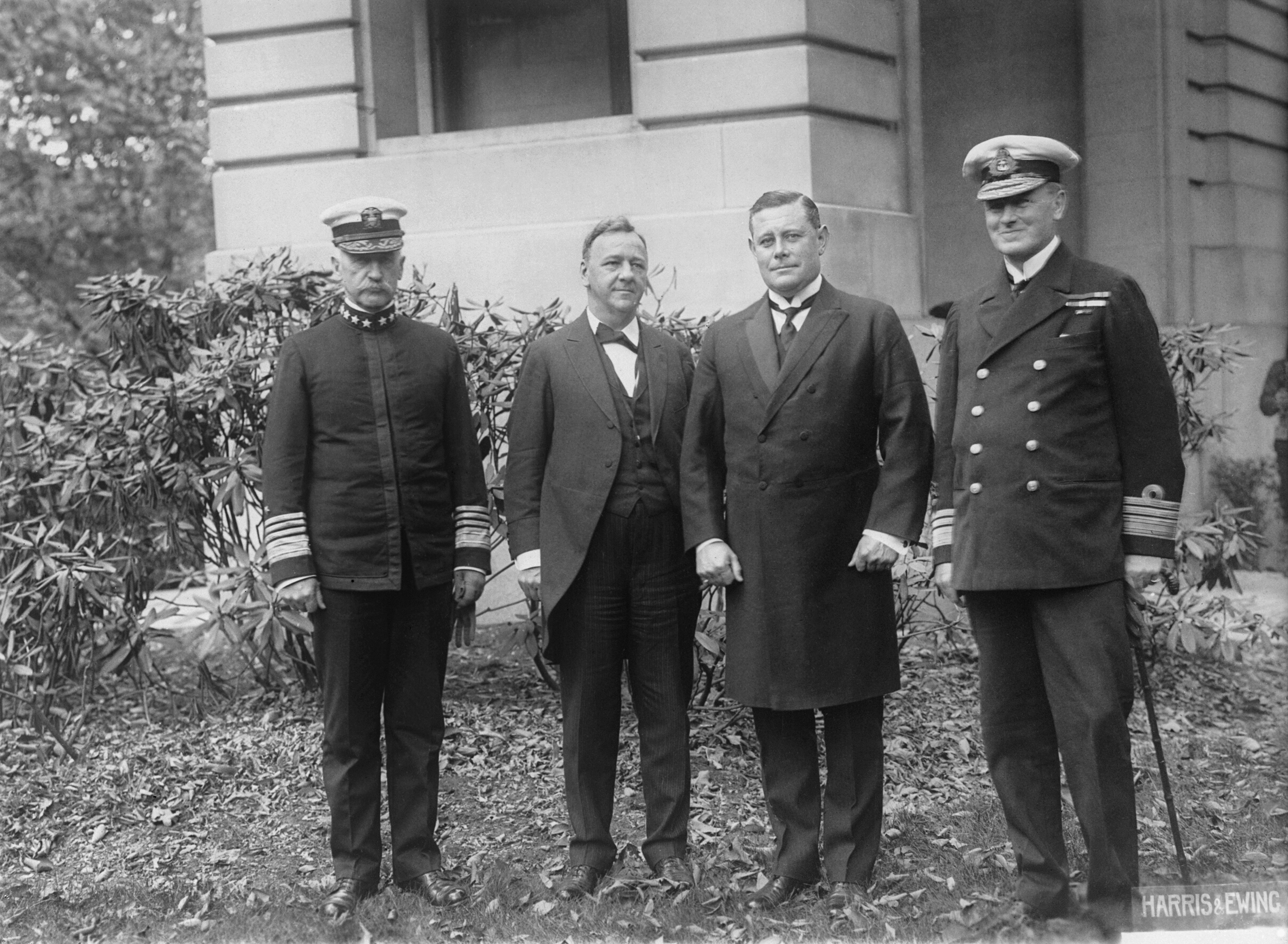
The Royal Navy in the Home Waters, 1914-1918 Q19398

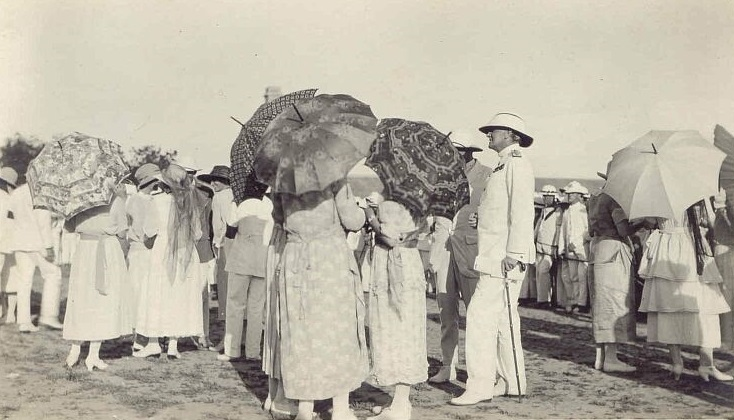
Admiral Duff at Weihaiwei in 1920

Duff joined the Royal Navy as a naval cadet in 1875. He was promoted Commander in 1897, and served in command of the destroyer HMS Bat in home waters from January 1898 to January 1900. In March that year, he was posted to HMS Excellent for senior officers' gunnery course at the gunnery school based there. He was promoted to captain on 31 December 1902, and to rear-admiral in 1913. In 1905 he was appointed Naval Assistant to the Controller of the Navy. In 1909, he was given command of HMS Temeraire. He was Director of the Mobilisation Division at the Admiralty from 1912 through the start of the war. He served in World War I as Rear-Admiral (Second-in-Command) of the 4th Battle Squadron from 1914 to 1916, taking part in the Battle of Jutland in 1916, where he flew his flag in HMS Superb. He was transferred to the Fourth Battle Squadron after Jutland.

He then became Director of the new Anti-Submarine Division at the end of 1916. Like the First Sea Lord, Admiral Jellicoe, Duff initially opposed the use of convoys. However, his efforts greatly reduced the destruction caused by the "underwater menace". In 1917 he became Assistant Chief of Naval Staff and then, from 1919, Commander-in-Chief, China Station. He retired in 1925.

== Honours ==
Duff was appointed a Companion of the Order of the Bath (CB) (civil division) in 1912, and a Companion of the military division of that Order in 1916 in recognition of service in the Battle of Jutland. He was promoted to Knight Commander of the Order (KCB) in the 1918 New Year Honours, He was appointed a Knight Commander of the Royal Victorian Order (KCVO) in 1922, and a Knight Grand Cross of the Order of the British Empire (GBE) in the 1924 Birthday Honours His final promotion was to Knight Grand Cross of the Order of the Bath (GCB) in the 1926 New Year Honours.

== Family ==
In 1886, he married his first cousin Janet Douglas Duff; they had two daughters. In 1924 he married Alice Marjorie Hill-Whitson; they had no children.

== Books ==
- Grigg, John. Lloyd George: War Leader, 1916–1918 Allen Lane, London 2002 ISBN 0-713-99343-X

Military offices
Preceded by Sir Frederick Tudor	Commander-in-Chief, China Station; 1919–1922	Succeeded by Sir Arthur Leveson
