= Charles Kennedy-Purvis =

Royal Navy Admiral (1884–1946)

Admiral Sir Charles Kennedy-Purvis GBE KCB
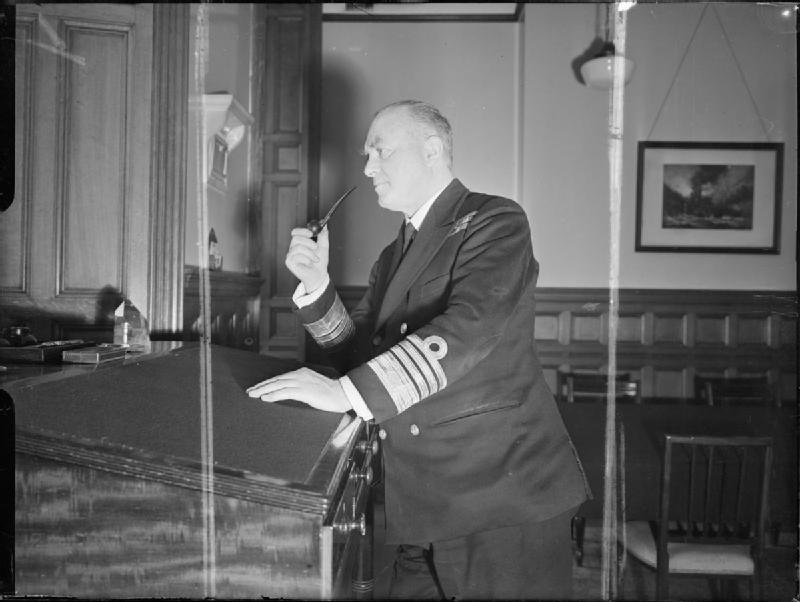
- Admiral Kennedy-Purvis as Deputy First Sea Lord during World War II
- Nickname: K-P
- Born: 2 May 1884
- Died: 26 May 1946 (aged 62)
- Allegiance: United Kingdom
- Branch: Royal Navy
- Service years: 1899–1946
- Rank: Admiral
- Commands: HMS Diomede; HMS Concord; HMS Glorious; 1st Cruiser Squadron; Royal Naval College, Greenwich; C-in-C, America & West Indies Station; Deputy First Sea Lord
- Conflicts: World War I World War II
- Awards: Knight Grand Cross of the Order of the British Empire; Knight Commander of the Order of the Bath; Commander of the Legion of Merit (USA)

Admiral Sir Charles Edward Kennedy-Purvis GBE KCB (2 May 1884 – 26 May 1946) was a Royal Navy officer who went on to be Deputy First Sea Lord.

== Naval career ==
He was the son of Captain Charles Kennedy-Purvis, who lost a leg during the Egypt campaign. Kennedy-Purvis entered the navy as a cadet in January 1899 aboard the training ship Britannia at Dartmouth. He became a midshipman on 15 May 1900, and was promoted to acting-sub-lieutenant on 15 July 1903, being confirmed in that rank on 11 January 1905. He was soon promoted again, to lieutenant on 1 July 1905, backdated to 15 January 1904.

Kennedy-Purvis became one of the Navy's early wireless telegraphy specialists, and after promotion to commander in June 1915 was appointed an instructor at the newly formed RN Signal School. He served as the executive officer of the cruiser Southampton in 1918–1919, and of the battleship Ajax in 1919–1920, then returned to the Signal School as its commander, having been promoted to captain in December 1921. He later served in the Admiralty's Signal Division, and commanded the cruiser Diomede in 1925, and the cruiser Concord in 1925–1926, before being appointed Director of the Signal Division in 1927.

From March 1931 Kennedy-Purvis commanded Glorious, soon after her conversion into an aircraft carrier, as part of the Mediterranean Fleet. He served as a Naval Aide-de-camp to the King from January 1933, was made a CB in April 1933, and promoted to rear admiral on 30 September 1933. In June 1935 he was appointed to the Board of Admiralty as an Assistant Chief of the Naval Staff with special responsibility for Fleet Air Arm affairs.

Between 1936 and 1938 he commanded the 1st Cruiser Squadron in the Mediterranean, receiving promotion to vice admiral on 28 June 1937. In 1939 he became the President of the Royal Naval College, Greenwich and Vice-Admiral Commanding the War College, and was awarded the KCB.

In March 1940 he was appointed Commander-in-Chief of the America and West Indies Station, with its base at the Royal Naval Dockyard in the Imperial fortress colony of Bermuda, with Admiralty House located across the Great Sound from the dockyard.

The British and United States Governments hurried an agreement in secrecy before Britain's 1939 declaration of war on Germany whereby the United States Navy would again be permitted a small base in Bermuda during the anticipated new war. This agreement would be expanded over the next two years to include a Naval Operating Base (containing a naval air station within it) on the Great Sound, near the already existing Royal Naval Dockyard, Royal Naval Air Station Bermuda, and Royal Air Force station on Darrell's Island, and an airfield, Kindley Field, which was to be used jointly by the Royal Air Force and Royal Navy. Satellite facilities, including a United States Navy submarine station on the former Royal Army Ordnance Corps depot of Ordnance Island, were also established, and the United States Army Coast Artillery Corps emplaced new coastal artillery around the colony, with the United States forces taking over much of the defence of Bermuda as an Allied base under the Bermuda Base Command.

On 15 February 1942 Kennedy-Purvis was promoted to admiral. In the West Indies, he successfully surmounted any difficulties and within a very short time was working in closest co-operation with his American counterpart. On 5 November, 1941, in front of a Guard of Honour provided by the Royal Marines detachment of Despatch, Kennedy-Purvis unveiled a monument to the crew of HMS Jervis Bay at Albouy's Point, in Hamilton, Bermuda, from where Jervis Bay had departed on her final mission (Bermuda was a formation point for trans-Atlantic convoys in both World Wars. During the Second World War, convoys formed at Bermuda and coded BHX merged at sea with those formed at Halifax, which were coded HX).

The American bases in Bermuda were subsequently grouped with those granted under the Destroyers for Bases Agreement in which fifty elderly destroyers were transferred from the United States to the UK in return for the right of the U.S. Navy and Air Forces to establish bases in British territories. No war material was received by Britain, however, in exchange for the bases in Bermuda or Newfoundland. The Commander-in-Chief, America and West Indies title was replaced with Senior British Naval Officer, Western Atlantic and Kennedy-Purvis was replaced by Vice-Admiral Sir Alban Curteis in this role in 1942.

In late 1942 he was recalled to England to become the Deputy First Sea Lord, an appointment created to relieve the First Sea Lord Admiral of the Fleet Sir Dudley Pound of the burden of his administrative duties, allowing him to concentrate on his role as Chief of the Naval Staff and a member of the Chiefs of Staff Committee.

After the war, Kennedy-Purvis was awarded the GBE, and was made a Commander of the Legion of Merit by the United States. Ill-health compelled him to retire in March 1946, and he died of a heart attack at his home on 26 May 1946. His funeral service was held at the Royal Naval College Chapel in Greenwich, followed by cremation at Woking Crematorium.

== Personal life ==
He married May Conquest in 1910, but had no children. Lady Kennedy-Purvis died in 1971.

Military offices
Preceded by Sir Sidney Bailey	President, Royal Naval College, Greenwich; 1938–1940	Succeeded by Vacant (next held by Augustus Agar)
Preceded by Sir Sidney Meyrick	Commander-in-Chief, America and West Indies Station; 1940–1942	Succeeded by Sir Alban Curteis
