= Desmond McCarthy =

Royal Navy admiral (1893–1966)

Admiral Sir Desmond McCarthy KCB DSO & Bar
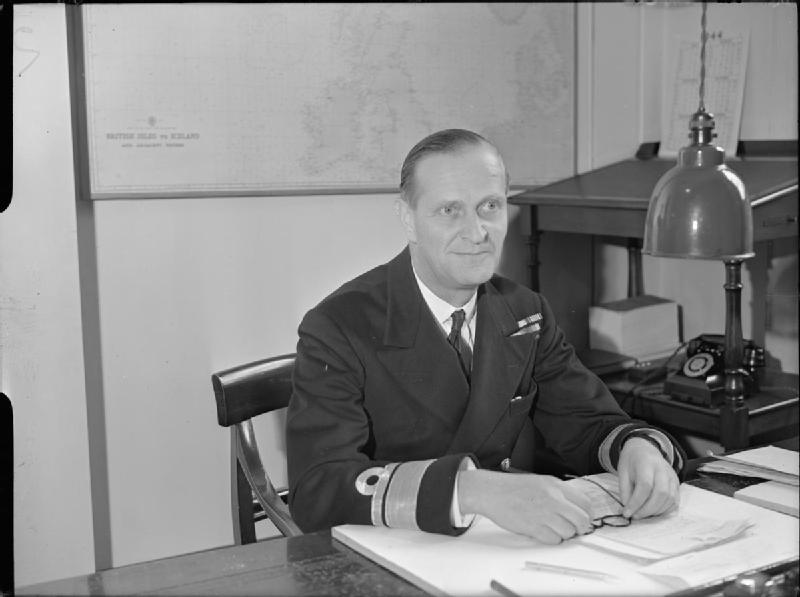
- Rear Admiral McCarthy at his desk at the Admiralty
- Born: 15 November 1893; Hampstead, London, England
- Died: 8 June 1966 (aged 72); Poole, Dorset, England
- Military career
- Allegiance: United Kingdom
- Branch: Royal Navy
- Service years: 1906–1950
- Rank: Admiral
- Commands: South Atlantic Station (1948–50); HMS Anson (1943–44); HMS Ajax (1940–41)
- Conflicts: First World War; Second World War; Battle of the Mediterranean; Battle of Cape Passero; Battle of Cape Matapan; Battle of Greece; Operation Tungsten
- Awards: Knight Commander of the Order of the Bath; Distinguished Service Order & Bar; Mentioned in Despatches (2)

Admiral Sir Edward Desmond Bewley McCarthy, KCB, DSO & Bar (15 November 1893 – 8 June 1966) was a Royal Navy officer who went on to be Commander-in-Chief, South Atlantic Station.

== Naval career ==
Promoted to captain in 1935, McCarthy was the highest ranking British officer at the Battle of Cape Passero in 1940, and he commanded HMS Ajax from 1940 and HMS Anson from 1943, taking part in Operation Tungsten against the German battleship Tirpitz in April 1944, and then becoming Assistant Chief of the Naval Staff in 1944. After the war he was appointed Rear Admiral, Destroyers in the Mediterranean Fleet and then Commander-in-Chief, South Atlantic Station from 1948. He retired in 1950.

== Personal life ==
Despite having an Irish (the MacCarthy dynasty were the Kings of Munster before the Norman invasion) surname he considered himself an Englishman, and always "referred to himself as an Englishman." He spoke fluent Latin and Italian, and thought of Italy as his favorite foreign country. He found Mussolini "horrifying" and hoped Mussolini would not damage what he felt was Italy's positive reputation. He was particularly disturbed by the lurid details he heard about Cesar More's occupation of Sicily. Many of his Italian friends in London were educators and pro-democracy activists who had to flee Italy due to the fascist regime. In 1925, McCarthy married Agatha Kentish, daughter of Brigadier General Horace John James Kentish. They had two sons.

Military offices
Preceded by Sir Clement Moody	Commander-in-Chief, South Atlantic Station; 1948–1950	Succeeded by Sir Herbert Packer
