= Naval Air Division (Royal Navy) =

1924–1964 organization in the British Royal Navy

Division overview
- Formed: 1924
- Preceding Division: Air Department
- Dissolved: 1964
- Superseding Division: Directorate of Naval Air Warfare
- Jurisdiction: Government of the United Kingdom
- Headquarters: Admiralty Building Whitehall London
- Parent department: Admiralty Naval Staff; Navy Department (Ministry of Defence)

The Air Division originally known as the Air Section and later known as the Naval Air Division was first established in 1924 and it was a Directorate of the Admiralty Naval Staff, that was initially responsible for operational control of aircraft supplied to the Royal Navy by the Air Ministry. In 1939, it gained full control over all matters relating to administration, control, policy and organisation of the Fleet Air Arm. It underwent various name changes until it was absorbed as part of the merger of the Admiralty into the new Ministry of Defence in April 1964 as part of the Navy Department where it continued until May 1966 when its remit was changed, becoming the Directorate of Naval Warfare.

== History ==
In June 1920 the Air Department was abolished and a new Air Section was established in July 1920, mainly in response to the fact that there was not a single unified authority responsible for co-coordinating all of the other specialist air agencies that included for example aircraft product, this was particularly the case during the interwar years as the problem was further exacerbated because operational command control of aircraft from warships was the responsibility of the Admiralty and the Royal Air Force was responsible for administration and training under the Air Ministry, this situation would not be rectified until two years before second world war. In 1924 saw the creation of a specific Fleet Air Arm. The air section now was put under the control of the Assistant Chief of the Naval Staff of the Admiralty Naval Staff where it was renamed Air Division until 1928 when it was renamed the Naval Air Division. The administration of the Fleet Air Arm and all its functions on land still remained in the hands Air Ministry despite on-going Admiralty opposition till July 1937 when both departments of state settled the dispute by returning the Fleet Air Arm to the Admiralty. At first only carrier-aircraft were involved, by May 1939 full administrative and operational control in regard to naval air warfare was passed to the Admiralty In April 1941 operational control of the land-based Coastal Command finally passed to the Admiralty. The staff division underwent a number of name changes following Naval Staff re-structuring and new functions were assigned to it, including the Air Warfare and Training Division, (1941–1943), the Naval Air Warfare & Flying Training Division, (1943–1950) and the Naval Air Warfare Division, (1951–1962), the Naval Air Division, (1963–1964) Post the merger of the Admiralty into the new Ministry of Defence in April 1964 this division it continued in its own name until May 1966 when its remit was amended and it became the Directorate of Naval Air Warfare.

== Directors ==
=== Director Air Division ===
Included:

- Captain Thomas F. P.Calvert: February 1924–September 1926
- Captain Cecil P. Talbot: September 1926–December 1928

=== Director Naval Air Division ===
- Captain Isham W. Gibson: December 1928–March 1930
- Captain Charles E. Turle: March 1930–March 1932
- Captain Henry C. Rawlings: March 1932–July 1934
- Captain Charles F. Harris: July 1934–January 1937
- Captain Cosmo M. Graham: January 1937–February 1939
- Captain Charles A. A. Larcom: February–November 1939
- Captain Clement Moody: November 1939–September 1941

=== Director Air Warfare and Training Division ===
- Captain A. Robin M. Bridge: September 1941–February 1943

=== Director Naval Air Warfare and Flying Training Division ===
- Captain John P. Wright: February 1943–January 1945
- Captain Guy Willoughby: January 1945–December 1946
- Captain Ernest H. Shattock: December 1946–April 1950

=== Director Naval Air Warfare Division ===
- Captain Charles L. G. Evans: April 1950–June 1951
- Captain Arthur S. Bolt: June 1951–October 1953
- Captain E. Duncan G. Lewin: October 1953–December 1954
- Captain Frank H. E. Hopkins: December 1954–September 1956
- Captain Dennis Cambell: September 1956–October 1957
- Captain Richard E. N. Kearney: October 1957–December 1958
- Captain Oswald N. Bailey: December 1958–October 1960
- Captain Desmond Vincent-Jones: October 1960 – 1962

=== Director Naval Air Division ===
- Captain Desmond Vincent-Jones: 1962–January 1964
- Captain George C. Baldwin: January 1964–May 1966 (as Director Naval Air Division -Admiralty Naval Staff to 1964 then Navy Department Naval Staff to 1966)

== Deputy Directors ==
Included:

- Captain Cosmo M. Graham: July 1936–January 1937
- Captain Reginald H. Portal: January 1937–February 1938
- Captain Gerald M.B. Langley: February 1938–November 1939
- Captain Robert M. Ellis: November 1939–February 1941
- Captain Edmund W. Anstice: February 1941–?1942
- Captain Barrington L. Moore: ?1942–February 1943
- Captain Arthur David Torlesse: February 1943–July 1944
- Captain Philip C.L. Yorke: July 1944–February 1946
- Captain Alexander N.C. Bingley: February 1946–August 1948
- Captain Edward O.F. Price: April 1948–April 1950
- Captain George H. Beale: August 1948–August 1950
- Captain Richard M. Smeeton: April 1950–August 1952
- Captain Brian E.W. Logan: August 1950–October 1952
- Captain F. Michael A. Torrens-Spence: August 1952–July 1954
- Captain Arthur J. T. Roe: October 1952–May 1955
- Captain John A. Ievers: July 1954–April 1957
- Captain Alan S. Webb: May 1955–December 1956
- Captain Richard E. N. Kearney: December 1956–April 1957
- Captain T. W. Harrington: April 1957–May 1958
- Captain John W. Collett: September 1957 – 1960
- Captain Donald C. E. F. Gibson: May 1958 – 1960
- Captain B. C. Godfrey Place: April 1960-February 1962
- Captain Douglas G. Parker: June 1960 – 1961
- Captain Eric M. Brown: February 1962–May 1964

== Sources ==
- Archives, The National. "Records of Naval Staff Departments". discovery.nationalarchives.gov.uk. National Archives, 1883–1978, ADM Division 10.
- Archives, The National. "Records of Air Department, Fleet Air Arm, Royal Naval Air Service and Department of Aircraft Equipment". discovery.nationalarchives.gov.uk. National Archives, 1914–1971 . ADM Division 11.
- Mackie, Colin, (2010–2014), British Armed Services between 1860 and the present day — Royal Navy - Senior Appointments, http://www.gulabin.com/.
- Roskill, Stephen Wentworth (1969), Documents Relating to the Naval Air Service: 1908–1918, vol. I, London: Navy Records Society
