= Anti-Submarine Division (Royal Navy) =

Former division of the Admiralty Department

Anti Submarine Division

Division overview
- Formed: 1916
- Preceding Division: Anti-Submarine Committee
- Dissolved: 1963
- Superseding Division: Undersurface Warfare Division
- Jurisdiction: Government of the United Kingdom
- Headquarters: Admiralty Building; Whitehall; London
- Parent department: Admiralty Naval Staff

The Anti-Submarine Division its original name, was the former anti-submarine warfare, planning and prevention directorate of the Admiralty Department from 1912 to 1963.

== History ==
The division evolved out the earlier Anti-Submarine Committee set up in 1910, that coordinated the Admiralty's earliest anti-submarine warfare proposals sent for consideration by the Board of Admiralty. Further systematic assessments and experimentation would take place from 1911 until 1915 when the Board of Invention and Research was established.

Efforts were made throughout the First World War to search for a system of countering submarine attacks. Offensive and defensive measures were assessed and sometimes implemented, with different degrees of achievement. However the losses caused by the U-boats in their campaign of unrestricted warfare did have a demoralising effect on national morale leaving the government with no other choice but to be prepared to consider almost every proposal to find, monitor, eliminate, and neutralise, all undersea threats. In December 1916 the division was created following a merger between the Intelligence Operations Division the Anti-Submarine Committee. The division would also take over the previous anti-submarine and minesweeping operations duties, conducted by the Operations Division.

By 1920 the navy established an Admiralty Research Laboratory specifically to test and evaluate new anti-submarine technologies. During the interwar-years the division was scaled down however by the advent of a second world war it would be expanded again. The division would go through a number of name changes during its existence such as the Anti-Submarine and Warfare Division (1939–43), Anti-U Boat Division (1943–45), Torpedo, Anti-Submarine and Minewarfare Division, (1945–50) and finally Undersurface Warfare Division, (1950–64). Post the abolishing of the Admiralty, the Ministry of Defence would continue anti-submarine operations.

== Responsibilities ==
When the division's was created, most weapons available to navy to counter submarine warfare had been put in place, but were often ineffective. Initially the majority of anti-submarine work was being conducted by the Auxiliary Patrol who was also engaged in operational seek and destroy tasks.

The Anti-Submarine Warfare Division synced its activities with that of the Minesweeping Division since it also dealt with the other under-water threat that of mining conducted by the enemy. This required large numbers of small anti-submarine vessels similar in some aspects to those employed on minesweeping.

Many of these small type of vessels were built and were equipped for both types of duty (AS) and (MS). At the start of world war one many trawlers were requisitioned, then were converted for these types of tasks, each civilian port, and naval base had its own allocation of ships for local coastal defence work.

When major attacks had occurred they were reported back to an assessment center who would then study the results very carefully, the centre would be chaired by the Director of Anti- Submarine Warfare, in order that the conclusions reached may be as accurate as possible. The assessment centre would then try to predict possible trends, but this was dependent on the success of countermeasures deployed to achieve the destruction of enemy's U-boats. The reports produced by the division became extremely important planning documents.

The division was also responsible for evaluating suggestions, from any source in relation to new methodologies and devices that might warrant further development or deployment afloat any opinions that were mainly scientific would be sent to the Board of Invention and Research for further investigation.

== Director's duties ==
He works under the superintendence of the Assistant Chief of the Naval Staff he is responsible for advising on:

- Monitoring and reporting back on the influence of torpedo development on strategy and tactics
- Consideration of all torpedo aspects in relation to the planning of operations
- Devising and implementing all possible forms of Anti-submarine tactical countermeasures against all forms of torpedo attack
- Staff requirements for torpedo armament of ships

== Directors ==
=== Director, Anti-Submarine Division ===
Included:

- Rear-Admiral Alexander L. Duff: December 1916-May 1917
- Captain William W. Fisher: May 1917-January 1919
- Captain Forster D. Arnold-Forster: January–April 1919
- Captain Gilbert O. Stephenson: April 1919-April 1920

=== Director, Anti-Submarine Warfare Division ===
- Captain Arthur G. Talbot: November 1939-September 1940
- Captain George E. Creasy: September 1940-August 1942
- Captain C. Philip Clarke: August 1942-September 1943

=== Director, Anti-U Boat Division ===
- Captain Clarence D. Howard-Johnston: September 1943-? 1945

=== Director, Torpedo, Anti-Submarine and Minewarfare Division ===
- Captain Lord Ashbourne: September 1945-April 1947
- Captain Robert S. Warne: April 1947-December 1948
- Captain Wilfrid J.W. Woods: December 1948-November 1950

=== Director, Undersurface Warfare Division ===
- Captain Terence A.K. Maunsell: November 1950-January 1952
- Captain Vernon D’A. Donaldson: January 1952-April 1954
- Captain Edward C. Bayldon: April 1954-May 1957
- Captain Bertram S. Pemberton: May 1957-September 1959
- Captain Ian L.M. McGeoch: September 1959-July 1960
- Captain George O. Symonds: July 1960-July 1962
- Captain Edmund N. Poland: July 1962-May 1965

== Deputy directors ==
Deputy Director of Anti-Submarine Warfare Division (D.D.A.S.W.D.)

- Captain C. Aubrey L. Mansergh: January 1940-November 1941
- Captain C. Philip Clarke: November 1941-March 1942
- Captain Neville A. Prichard: March 1942-July 1943

Deputy Director of Torpedo, Anti-Submarine and Minewarfare Division

- Captain Nicholas A. Copeman: December 1947-February 1950
- Captain Terence A.K. Maunsell: February–November 1950

Deputy Director of Undersurface Warfare Division

- Captain John Grant: November 1950-September 1951
- Captain Arthur R. Hezlet: September 1951-October 1952
- Captain Robert L. Alexander: October 1952-October 1954
- Captain Patrick J. Cowell: October 1954-October 1956
- Captain C. Patrick Norman: October 1956-September 1958
- Captain Ian L.M. McGeoch: September 1958-September 1959
- Captain George O. Symonds: September 1959-July 1960
- Captain Derrick G. Kent: July 1960-September 1962
- Captain Iwan G. Raikes: September 1962-November 1964
- Captain David Hepworth: November 1964-January 1967

== Assistant directors ==
Assistant Director of Anti-Submarine Division (A.D.A.S.D):

- Captain Frederic C. Dreyer, 18 December 1916 – 1 March 1917
- Captain Humphrey T. Walwyn, 1 March 1917 – January, 1918

== Subordinate staff sections ==
A more detailed breakdown of the distribution of work allocated within the division to the various staff sections can be seen below.

Early Anti-Submarine measures as of 1916:
Devise new strategy of grouping destroyers into Hunting Patrols.
Building "P" and "PC" class patrol boats.
Establish of coastal air patrols
Deploy friendly submarines on anti-submarine patrols
Deploy more decoy ships
Increase the supply of depth charges and high-speed sweeps
Increase the supply of later-model hydrophones

As of 1917:
Section	Admiralty Room	Responsibility
(A.D.A.S.D)	(A.D.A.S.D)	Auxiliary Patrol
(A.D.A.S.D) 2	(A.D.A.S.D)	Organisation and operation (except hunting flotillas, motor launches, and coastal motor boats.) Fishery questions.
(A.D.A.S.D)	(A.D.A.S.D)	Special Service Ships, motor launches, coastal motor boats, and hydrophone hunting flotillas.
(A.D.A.S.D) 4	(A.D.A.S.D)	Hydrophones, torpedo questions, single-towed charges, E.C. mines, patents, connected floating mines, H.S. minesweep, wireless telegraphy. Hydrophones - invention and design. Assistant to Captain. Hydrophones - inspection of bases. Assistant to Commander.
(A.D.A.S.D) 3	(A.D.A.S.D)	Hydrophones - charge of manufacture, fitting out and distribution. Hydrophones - distribution. Hydrophones - Assistant to Lieutenant-Commander. Hydrophones - Fitting out. Hydrophones - Manufacture.

As of 1917:
Section	Admiralty Room	Responsibility
Auxiliary Patrol	(A.D.A.S.D)	(Location of Auxiliary Patrol vessels. All questions in connection with (A.P.) vessels), (Gunnery fittings and gunnery efficiency o f all A.P. vessels. Howitzers - Depth Charge throwers. Allocation o f guns to (A.P) vessels and D.A.M.S.), (Indicator Nets. Mined Nets. Provision and use. Organisation o f Net Flotillas. Smoke Apparatus.
Apparatus	(A.D.A.S.D)	(Experimental & Patents- Hydrophone shore stations, Indicator Loop stations, Sound Ranging stations, Torpedo questions, BI Hawkcraig & Weymouth liaison, Watch all foreign progress, P.V. & W/T equipment of all (A.P.) vessels), (Distribution and Use-Distribution and use of all detecting apparatus, before it becomes standardised.
Charting	(A.D.A.S.D)	(a) Continual watch kept. All S/Ms charted, Serves DMM as well as DASD; (b) Examination service at all ports; (c) Traffic regulations (see also A.D.O.D.l and Section 4).
Operations	(A.D.A.S.D)	(Operations against enemy s/ms outside North Sea, Tactics of s/m v s/m, Disposition -formation of Convoy Escorts, Tactics of Merchantmen, Hunting Flotillas in Mediterranean, Statistics-Preparation of weekly reports for ASD).

== Attribution ==
Primary source for this article is by Harley Simon, Lovell Tony, (2017), Anti-Submarine Division (Royal Navy), dreadnoughtproject.org, http://www.dreadnoughtproject.org.

== Sources ==
- Admiralty, Technical History Section (1919). The Technical History and Index: The Anti-Submarine Division of the Naval Staff. Vol. 1, Part 7. C.B. 1515 (7), O.U. 6171/7. National Archives. ADM 275/19.
- Archives, The National. "Records of Naval Staff Departments", discovery.nationalarchives.gov.uk. National Archives, 1912-1964.
- Black, Nicholas (2009). The British Naval Staff in the First World War. Woodbridge: The Boydell Press. ISBN 9781843834427.
- Naval Staff, Training and Staff Duties Division (1929). The Naval Staff of the Admiralty. Its Work and Development. B.R. 1845 (late C.B. 3013). Copy at The National Archives. ADM 234/434
- Mackie, Colin, (2010-2014), British Armed Services between 1860 and the present day — Royal Navy - Senior Appointments, https://www.gulabin.com/.
