= Training and Staff Duties Division (Royal Navy) =

British Royal Navy, naval staff

Agency overview
- Formed: 1917-1958
- Preceding agency: Gunnery and Torpedo Division
- Jurisdiction: United Kingdom
- Headquarters: Admiralty, London
- Agency executive: Director Training and Staff Duties Director Tactical and Staff Duties
- Parent agency: Admiralty Naval Staff

The Training and Staff Duties Division, later known as the Tactical and Staff Duties Division, was a directorate of the Admiralty Naval Staff of the Royal Navy responsible for the tactical use of naval weapons and the training of naval personnel in relation to operational requirements from 1917 to 1958.

== History ==
The Training and Staff Duties Division was established as part of the reorganisation of the Admiralty in 1917 under the command of Rear-Admiral James C. Ley. The DTSD, or Director of Training and Staff Duties, was a naval officer (usually a captain) employed within the Admiralty and was mainly responsible for the administration of officers' education. He was expected to comment on all questions of officer education and suggest answers to problems, but was rarely required to sit on committees and did not have an active role in formatting syllabi. In June 1945 the directorate was renamed Tactical and Staff Duties Division and existed until 1958.

== Office of the Directors of Division ==
=== Directors Training and Staff Duties Division ===
Post holders included:

- Rear-Admiral James C. Ley: December 1917-April 1918
- Captain Herbert W. Richmond: April 1918-January 1919
- Captain Walter M. Ellerton: January 1919-December 1921
- Captain Vernon H.S.Haggard: December 1921-September 1923
- Captain Hugh J.Tweedie: September 1923-January 1926
- Captain Arthur L. Snagge: January–July 1926 (later vice-admiral)
- Captain Sidney J.Meyrick: July 1926-July 1927
- Captain Noel F. Laurence: July 1927-April 1928
- Captain Isham W. Gibson: April–December 1928 (later rear-admiral)
- Captain Bernard W.M. Fairbairn: December 1928-April 1929 (later vice-admiral)
- Captain Edward O. Cochrane: April 1929-August 1931 (later rear-admiral)
- Captain James S. M. Ritchie: August 1931-June 1933 (later rear-admiral)
- Captain Geoffrey S. Arbuthnot: June 1933-March 1934
- Captain Frederick A. Buckley: March 1934-May 1936 (later rear-admiral)
- Captain A. Lumley St. G. Lyster: May 1936-September 1937
- Captain William L.Jackson: September 1937-April 1940
- Captain James W. Rivett-Carnac: April 1940-July 1941
- Captain Richard V. Symonds-Tayler: July 1941-July 1942
- Captain Harry P. K. Oram: July 1942-June 1945

=== Directors Tactical and Staff Duties Division ===
Post Holders included:

- Captain Charles L. Robertson: June 1945-May 1947
- Captain Royer M. Dick: May 1947-November 1948 (later rear-admiral)
- Captain Richard G. Onslow: November 1948-April 1951
- Captain W.Kaye Edden: April 1951-October 1953
- Captain Walter A. Adair: October 1953-November 1955
- Captain Guy W. Hawkins: November 1955-January 1958

== Deputy Directors of the Training and Staff Duties Division ==
Post holders included:

- Captain Guy P. Bigg-Wither, 15 January 1919 – 1 February 1919
- Captain Edward A. Astley-Rushton, 1 February 1919 – 8 February 1921[24]
- Captain Noel F. Laurence, 1 July 1926 – 1 July 1927
- Captain Isham W. Gibson, 1 July 1927 – 10 April 1928
- Captain Hubert Ardill, 17 March 1930 – 7 December 1931
- Captain Geoffrey S. Arbuthnot, 14 March 1932 – 18 June 1933
- Captain Frederick A. Buckley, 16 October 1933 – 14 March 1934

== Timeline ==
- Board of Admiralty, Admiralty Naval Staff, Training and Staff Duties Division (1917-1945).
- Board of Admiralty, Admiralty Naval Staff, Tactical and Staff Duties Division (1945-1958)
