= Deputy First Sea Lord =

Office of the Deputy First Sea Lord
- Ensign of the Royal Navy
- Department of the Admiralty
- Member of: Board of Admiralty
- Reports to: First Sea Lord
- Nominator: First Lord of the Admiralty
- Appointer: Prime Minister; Subject to formal approval by the King-in-Council
- Term length: 1-4 years
- Inaugural holder: Rosslyn E. Wemyss
- Formation: 1917-1919, 1942-1946

The Deputy First Sea Lord (D.F.S.L.) was a senior Royal Navy flag officer on the Board of Admiralty of the Royal Navy.

== History ==
Vice-Admiral Sir Rosslyn Wemyss was appointed a Lord Commissioner of the Admiralty as Second Sea Lord on 6 September 1917. before being relieved on 27 September by Vice-Admiral Herbert Heath. In his memoirs, he described the circumstances of his appointment:

The First Lord's [Geddes] original idea had been that I should be Second Sea Lord, but that the traditional duties of that office should be somewhat modified, so as to allow me to take up Staff Duties. The reason for this was that until now, should the First Sea Lord for any reason be absent from the Admiralty, the whole of the burden and responsibility of the war devolved automatically on the Second Sea Lord, whose duties in connection with the personnel did not allow him sufficient time to study Staff matters. Consequently he (Second Sea Lord) might find himself called upon at any moment to give decisions on matters with which he could not possibly be familiar. On considering the situation I advised the First Lord that it would be better not to interfere with the duties of Second Sea Lord, which were so well understood on all sides, and which required the full attention of one man, but appoint me as additional with my duties entirely confined to Staff work, and that an officer should be appointed as Second Sea Lord who would be junior to me. By this means the conduct of the war would, in the absence of the First Sea Lord, automatically fall into my hands.

In 1919, John Jellicoe wrote that, "This appointment was frankly made more as a matter of expediency than because any real need had been shown for the creation of such an office." He later claimed in his autobiographical notes that, "The introduction of a Deputy First Sea Lord was only agreed to by me as the result of my conversations with Beatty and Madden. The idea emanated from Sir Eric Geddes who saw in the appointment a way of overcoming the Prime Minister's objections to Sir Henry Oliver, [D.C.N.S.] remaining at the Admiralty. . . . The intention was that in my absence Admiral Wemyss could represent me at the War Council instead of Sir H. Oliver."

In August, 1919, when Rear-Admiral George Hope was appointed to command the Third Light Cruiser Squadron, the position of Deputy First Sea Lord was not filled.

== Duties ==
As of 1917:

- General questions of Naval Policy, other than questions connected with operations in Home Waters.
- Questions relating to Foreign Stations and Overseas operations. Letters of Proceedings from Commanders-in-Chief abroad.
- Questions affecting Shore Defences and co-operation with Military (in consultation with D.C.N.S. when necessary).
- General questions as to Blockade and Trade.
- Refits of Ships not affecting D.C.N.S. or A.C.N.S.
- Superintendence of Operations Division (F) of Naval Staff
- Superintendence of Hydrographic Department.

== Assessment ==
According to authors Harley and Lovell "There can be no doubt that the appointment of Wemyss as Deputy First Sea Lord was to insert an officer amenable to Geddes into a senior position on the Board of Admiralty. The position was completely superfluous to the structure which had evolved at the end of May, 1917. It is no wonder, therefore, that all Wemyss had to do, in his own words" It was give Jellicoe", "an extra opinion on dockets which could well be dispensed with." It is indicative that when Wemyss succeeded Jellicoe as First Sea Lord and Chief of the Naval Staff in December, 1917, the position of Deputy First Sea Lord was filled by a junior Rear-Admiral with responsibility for "Policy and Foreign" matters. Only the D.O.D. (F) and the Director of Training and Staff Duties reported to him. "As before, the duties of the professional head of the Royal Navy if absent fell upon the shoulders of the Second Sea Lord. After Rear-Admiral Hope was appointed to a sea-going command in August, 1919, the position was allowed to lapse".

In 1942, the post was revived again to alleviate the workload of the First Sea Lord during World War II and was held by Admiral Sir Charles Kennedy-Purvis until 1946.

== Deputy First Sea Lords ==
DFSL
Rank	Name	Image	In office	Notes	Reference
Vice Admiral	Sir Rosslyn Wemyss		6 – 26 September 1917		
Vice Admiral	Sir Herbert Heath		27 September–December 1917		
Rear Admiral	George Hope		10 January 1918– 5 August 1919		
Admiral	Sir Charles Kennedy-Purvis		29 July 1942–May 1946		
