= Operations Division (Royal Navy) =

Directorate of the Admiralty Naval Staff

Division overview
- Formed: 1912
- Dissolved: 1961
- Superseding Division: Trade Division and Operations Division
- Jurisdiction: Government of the United Kingdom
- Headquarters: Admiralty Building; Whitehall; London
- Parent department: Admiralty Naval Staff

The Operations Division was a former directorate of the Admiralty Naval Staff responsible for the creation and implementation of long-term policy in regards to the composition of all Royal Navy fleets, squadrons and commands and including operational planning and monitoring from 1912 to 1961.

== History ==
The Operations division was established in January 1912 initially as a component part of the new Admiralty War Staff created by the First Lord of the Admiralty Winston Churchill and later the naval staff. It worked closely with the Naval Intelligence Division throughout most of existence and remained until 1961 when it was amalgamated with the Trade Division to create a new Trade and Operations Division. In 1964 the Admiralty Department was abolished, however trade and operations functions continued under the new Naval Staff function within the Navy Department of the Ministry of Defence as the Directorate of Naval Operations and Trade.

== Responsibilities ==
The division was chiefly responsible for coordinating the distribution of the British fleet globally and for the general day-to-day, movements of each of the Royal Navy's units as ordered by the Board of Admiralty, and acted-upon initially by the Chief of the War Staff later Chief of the Naval Staff. However each of the individual Commander-in-Chief's regulated the movements of fleets, flotilla's or squadrons and ships that was under their respective commands.

The division had to ensure that accurate information was constantly available at all times, this included the positions and conditions of all the most important ships. This was done by devising an operational plotting system that enabled the Admiralty to track of all ship movements, all scheduling of re-fits, monitoring fuel levels, and monitoring ammunition storage levels worldwide .

The division would coordinate closely with the Operational Intelligence Center within the Naval Intelligence Division. The Operations Division received intelligence communiques, reviewed the importance of them, then would recommend any necessary remedying actions to be taken. When orders were approved by the Naval Staff they were communicated to all commanding flag officers who would action them.

== Directors duties ==
As of 1918:

- Director: Matters relating to operations, distribution of the Fleet, minelaying, submarines, co-operation of Allied ships, hospital ships and air operations.
- Deputy Director: Matters relating to transports and trade, sailing orders, trials, commissioning orders, all systems of communications, navigation, Board of Trade reports, fisheries.
- Assistant Director (1): Matters relating to foreign stations (except such as are dealt with by D.D.O.D.), entry into defended ports at home and abroad, swept channels at defended ports, traffic regulations, courts martial and courts of enquiry, administration of the Operations Division.
- Assistant Director (2): Matters relating to shore defences and the defence of vulnerable points on shore, at home and abroad. Distribution of Seamen and Marines.Checks all promotions.

== Directors of Division ==
=== Pre-World War One period ===
==== Director of Operations Division ====
included:

- Captain George A. Ballard, 8 January 1912 – 1 May 1914

=== World War One period ===
==== Director of Operations Division ====
- Rear-Admiral Arthur Leveson, 1 May 1914 – 16 January 1915
- Rear-Admiral Thomas Jackson, 17 January 1915 – 11 June 1917
- Rear-Admiral George Hope, 11 June 1917 – 9 January 1918

=== Inter-war period ===
==== Director of Operations Division (Home) ====
Included:

- Captain Dudley Pound, 12 January 1918 – 15 July 1919
- Captain John D. Kelly, 15 July 1919 – 1 April 1920

==== Director of Operations Division (Foreign) ====
Included:

- Captain Charles P. R. Coode, 18 January 1918 – 31 March 1920

==== Director of Operations Division ====
Included:

- Rear-Admiral John D. Kelly, 1 April 1920 – 15 February 1922
- Captain Henry W. Parker, 1 February 1922
- Captain Wilfred Tomkinson, 21 November 1923–April 1926
- Captain Frank F. Rose, April 1926,–March 1928
- Captain Percy Noble, March, 1928–January 1930
- Captain Dudley Burton Napier North, January, 1930–July 1932
- Captain Charles G. Brodie, July–December 1932
- Captain Francis H. W. Goolden, December, 1932–December 1933
- Captain Henry Pridham-Wippell, December, 1933–December 1935
- Captain Charles H. Knox-Little, December, 1935–July 1938
- Captain Charles M. Blackman, July, 1938–December 1939

=== World War Two period ===
==== Director of Operations Division (Home) ====
- Captain Cecil H. J. Harcourt, September 1939-February 1941
- Captain Ralph Edwards (Royal Navy officer), February–December 1941
- Captain John Eccles (Royal Navy officer), December 1941-October 1943
- Captain C. T. Mark Pizey, December 1943-? 1945

==== Director of Operations Division (Foreign) ====
- Captain Robert H.Bevan: September 1939-September 1940
- Captain Gerald H. Warner: September 1940-March 1941
- Captain John Terry: March 1941-August 1942
- Captain Angus D. Nicholl: August 1942-August 1944
- Captain Frederick R. Parham: August 1944-January 1947

=== Post War period ===
==== Director of Operations Division ====
- Captain Charles H. Duffett: January 1947-January 1949
- Captain George B.H. Fawkes: January 1949-July 1951
- Captain Patrick W. Brock: July 1951-October 1953
- Captain John S.S. Litchfield: October 1953-December 1954
- Captain Peter D.H.R. Pelly: December 1954-June 1956
- Captain Walter Evershed: June 1956-June 1957
- Captain Bryan C. Durant: June 1957-January 1959
- Captain Eric V. St.J. Morgan: January 1959-May 1960
- Captain Michael G. Haworth: May 1960-July 1961

== Deputy Directors ==
=== Deputy Director of Operations ===
Included:

- Captain Henry W. Grant: July 1917-January 1918
- Captain Bernard St.G. Collard, January 1918-February 1920
- Captain Arthur de K. L. May, January–September 1919
- Captain Hubert H. Holland, September 1919-January 1920
- Captain Sidney R. Bailey, February 1920-March 1921
- Captain Henry G.E. Lane, April 1920-September 1921
- Captain Charles D. Burke, March 1921-April 1922
- Captain Alister F. Beal, September 1921-July 1923
- Captain Wilfred Tomkinson, July–November 1923
- Captain Ambrose M. Peck, November 1923-October 1925
- Captain Frank F. Rose, October 1925-April 1926
- Captain Francis M. Austin, April 1926-August 1927
- Captain Geoffrey Layton, August 1927-August 1929
- Captain Robert R. Turner, August 1929-August 1931
- Captain Francis H.W. Goolden, August 1931-December 1932
- Captain Ernest J. Spooner, December 1932-July 1934
- Captain Ronald W. Blacklock, July 1934-July 1936
- Captain Irving M. Palmer, July 1936-September 1938
- Captain Cecil H.J. Harcourt, September 1938-September 1939

=== Deputy Director of Operations (Home) ===
- Captain Ralph A. B. Edwards, October 1939-February 1941
- Captain John F. Stevens, February 1941-August 1942
- Captain Wilfred J.C. Robertson, August 1942-December 1943
- Captain Francis B. Lloyd: December 1943-March 1945
- Captain Christopher T. Jellicoe: March 1945 – 1947

=== Deputy Director of Operations (Foreign) ===
Included:

- Captain Gerald H. Warner, February–September 1940
- Captain John Terry, September 1940-March 1941
- Captain William W. Davis, March 1941-January 1942
- Captain Hugh Dalrymple-Smith, January 1942-November 1943
- Captain Ronald G. Mackay, November 1943-March 1946
- Captain Terence A.K. Maunsell, March 1946-March 1948
- Captain William H. Selby, March 1948-April 1950
- Captain Ralph C. Medley, April 1950-April 1952
- Captain John S.M. Richardson, April 1952-January 1954
- Captain Peter Phipps, January 1954-March 1955
- Captain John Plunkett-Cole: March 1955-January 1957
- Captain N.F. Carrington, January 1957-February 1958
- Captain Josef C. Bartosik, February 1958-April 1959
- Captain Richard I. Peek, April 1959-December 1960

=== Deputy Director of Operations (Foreign and Trade) ===
- Captain J.A. Murray, December 1960-September 1961
- Captain Roland F. Plugge, September 1961-November 1963

== Assistant Directors of Operations ==
Assistant Director of Operation Division (A.D.O.D.):

- Captain Charles P. R. Coode, 11 June 1917 – 18 January 1918

== Second Assistant Directors ==
- Captain George P. W. Hope, 15 December 1916

== Operations division sub staff sections ==
A more detailed breakdown of the distribution of work allocated within the division to the various staff sections can be seen below as of 1917:

| Section | Admiralty Room | Distribution of Work |
|---|---|---|
| One | 38 (OB) | Distribution of fleet (battleships, battle cruisers and light cruisers) all questions relating to (see also section 9). Sailing orders for H.M. ships (referred by M. Branch).Refits, docking, repairs etc. of H.M. ships. New ships - programme of trials and commissioning orders. British portion of Monthly Return of War vessels.Reports of Courts-martial and Courts of Enquiry. Visual signals.Is responsible for seeing that other departments concerned are informed of movements of ships. |
| Two | 38 (OB) | Systems of communication generally, including questions of policy regarding to wireless telegraphy (British and Foreign), laying and repair of cables, movements and work of cableships, land-line telegraphs and telephones, communications between H. M. Ships and merchant vessels at home and abroad. |
| Three | 38 (OB) | Harbour and coast defence of the United Kingdom, British Dominions and Colonies and India, including:- (a) Disposition of guns, lights, mines, booms, etc., and personnel necessary for these; (b) Examination service at all ports; (c) Traffic regulations (see also A.D.O.D.l and Section 4). |
| Four | B. (AH) | Instructions for Entry of H.M. ships into Defended Ports at home and abroad. Swept Channels, booms, etc., at defended ports. Confidential and public traffic regulations (see also A.D.O.D. 1 and Section 3). Fishing and fishing areas round the North Sea and Atlantic. |
| Five | 38 (OB) | Movements of all H.M. Ships employed abroad and letters of proceedings from Commanders in Chief on foreign stations. (See also Section 10). Corrects “Pink List” (secret telegrams), as regards H.M. Ships abroad. Keeps wall charts in Chart Room corrected as regards vessels on foreign service. |
| Six | A. (AH) | Controlled sailings in connection with French Coal Trade and ore trade from North coast of Spain. Board of Trade reports. Reports dealing with enemy submarines (see also section 8). Courts of Enquiry relating to reports of sinkings of merchant ships |
| Seven | 38 (OB) | Movements and letters if proceedings of 10th Cruiser Squadron, Grand Fleet destroyer flotillas, H.M. ships (not belonging to the Grand Fleet) at Home ports, H.M. ships stationed at bases, minelayers and mine-carriers in Home waters. Corrects “Pink List” as regards the foregoing vessels. |
| Eight | 66 (OB) | All matters relating to distribution and employment of destroyers, patrol flotillas, submarines, sloops, special service vessels, auxiliary patrols, escorts by auxiliary patrols. Prepares daily statement of destroyer flotillas. Telegrams and reports dealing with enemy submarines (see also Section 6). |
| Nine | B. (AH) | Movements of ships of the Grand Fleet when detached from repairs, and armed boarding vessels, minesweepers and supply vessels attached to Grand Fleet. White Sea - Trade and defence. Movements and refit of vessels stationed in White Matters relating to Hospital ships. Assists in Chart Room and takes duty there when required. |
| Ten | B. (AH) | Overseas operations. Naval Flotilla on Lakes Tanganyika and Victoria. Questions concerning Persia and Abyssinia. Letters of proceedings from Mediterranean, East Indies and China. |
| Eleven | 38 (OB) | Air Operations. Anti-aircraft defences. W/T and other communications with aircraft. |
| Twelve | 66 (OB) | (Commander, RN.) |
| Twelve (a) | 66 (OB) | Movements of troop and store transports, wheat, sugar and nitrate transports, mercantile fleet auxiliaries (colliers, oilers, store vessels, hospital ships, munition ships, tugs) and merchant vessels carrying valuable Government cargoes. Sailing orders and route instructions for the above. Board of Trade reports. Merchant ship casualties. Minesweeping reports. Matters relating to navigation. |
| Thirteen | B. (AH) | Mining operations and records. Matters relating to torpedoes. |
| Fourteen | Chart Room | Records of all telegrams referring to mines, wrecks, lights, buoys, swept channels, dangerous areas, etc., and plots positions of mines reported, suspicious vessels and objects, and dangerous and prohibited areas. Superintends correction of reference charts by cartographer from Hydrographic office. |
| Fifteen | Chart Room | (Assistant to D.O.D.) |
| Sixteen | Planning Room | Formulation and preparation of all plans |
| Twenty | 39 (OB) | (Acting Staff Clerk in charge of clerical staff). |
| Twenty (a) | 39 (OB) | (Acting Staff Clerk) |

== Attribution ==
Primary source for this article is by Harley Simon, Lovell Tony, (2017), Operations Division (Royal Navy), dreadnoughtproject.org, http://www.dreadnoughtproject.org.

== Sources ==
- Archives, The National. "Records of Naval Staff Departments", discovery.nationalarchives.gov.uk. National Archives, 1912–1964.
- Black, Nicholas (2009). The British Naval Staff in the First World War. Woodbridge: The Boydell Press. ISBN 9781843834427.
- Naval Staff, Training and Staff Duties Division (1929). The Naval Staff of the Admiralty. Its Work and Development. B.R. 1845 (late C.B. 3013). Copy at The National Archives. ADM 234/434
- Mackie, Colin, (2010–2014), British Armed Services between 1860 and the present day — Royal Navy - Senior Appointments, http://www.gulabin.com/.
- Rodger. N.A.M., (1979) The Admiralty (offices of state), T. Dalton, Lavenham, ISBN 978-0900963940.
- Smith, Gordon (2014), British Admiralty, Part 2 - Changes in Admiralty Departments 1913-1920, Naval-History.Net.
