= Admiral Commanding, Reserves =

Senior Royal Navy post

Office of the Admiral Commanding, Reserves
- Ensign of the Royal Navy
- Admiralty, Ministry of Defence
- Reports to: First Sea Lord, then Second Sea Lord
- Nominator: Secretary of State for Defence
- Appointer: Prime Minister; Subject to formal approval by the King-in-Council
- Term length: Not fixed (typically 1–4 years)
- Inaugural holder: Vice-Admiral Sir John W. Tarleton
- Formation: 1875-1976

The Admiral Commanding, Reserves, was a senior Royal Navy post that existed from 1875 to 1976.

== History ==
Before 1857 the HM Coast Guard was attached to the Customs Service for revenue duties, and was a Controller-General of the Coastguard. In January, 1869, Captain Willes was called to the Admiralty to assist the First Naval Lord in conducting the duties of the Coastguard and the Royal Naval Reserve, as well as to give general assistance in other matters, and, in October, 1870, was confirmed in office with the title of Chief of the Staff, Naval Reserves. The office of Chief of the Staff was continued but for a brief term, and, following an Order in Council of December 12, 1874, an Admiral Superintendent of Naval Reserves was appointed to take charge of the Naval Reserve afloat. He was also given charge of Coastguard stations ashore, the Royal Naval Reserve, the Royal Naval Artillery Volunteers, and the Seamen Pensioners' Reserve.

In 1903 responsibility for the HM Coast Guard passed to the Admiralty. On 21 May 1903 the office of Admiral Commanding Coastguard and Reserves was established, the first incumbent being Admiral Sir Ernest Rice.

After 1903 the Admiral's duties included:

- Co-operate with the Commissioners of Customs.
- Co-operate with the Board of Trade.
- Keep the district ships ready and efficient for mobilization and make arrangements for making up their sea-going complements.
- Manage and supervise the Royal Naval Reserve.
- Manage and supervise the Royal Naval Volunteers.
- Manage and supervise the Seamen and Marine Pensioners' Reserve.
- Organise official inspection visits to coast stations of the Coastguard, drill-ships and batteries of the Naval Reserve.
- Promote below the rank of Chief Officer
- Submit to the Board of Admiralty promotions to the rank of Chief Officer
- Superintend Her Majesty's Coastguard.
- Visit mercantile training ships and arrange training if needed.

In March 1923 responsibility for the majority of the functions of the Coast Guard was passed to the Board of Customs and Excise and the Board of Trade. In July 1923 the office was then re-styled Admiral Commanding, Reserves, which remained the title until the post was abolished in 1976. Successive Admirals Commanding were supported in their duties by an assistant until 1902 and then a chief of staff until 1976.

Responsibility for administering reserves then came under the Commander-in-Chief, Naval Home Command, as a dual role until 1994. From 1994-1996 the Second Sea Lord became responsible for managing reserves.

== Admirals commanding ==
Post holders included:

=== Admiral Superintendent of Naval Reserves ===
- Vice-Admiral Sir John W. Tarleton: January 1875–November 1876
- Vice-Admiral Augustus Phillimore: November 1876–December 1879
- Rear-Admiral Prince Alfred, Duke of Edinburgh: November 1879–November 1882
- Rear-Admiral Sir Anthony H. Hoskins: November 1882–September 1885
- Vice-Admiral John K. E. Baird: September 1885–April 1888
- Vice-Admiral Sir George Tryon: April 1888–April 1891
- Vice-Admiral Robert O'Brien FitzRoy: April 1891–April 1894
- Vice-Admiral Sir Edward H.Seymour: April 1894–May 1897
- Vice-Admiral Sir Compton E. Domvile: May 1897–May 1900
- Vice-Admiral Sir Gerard H. U. Noel: May 1900–May 1903

=== Admiral Commanding, Coastguard and Reserves ===
- Admiral Ernest Rice: May 1903–February 1905
- Admiral Sir Reginald F. H. Henderson: February 1905–December 1909
- Admiral Sir Frederick S. Inglefield: December 1909–January 1913
- Admiral Sir Arthur M. Farquhar: January 1913–June 1915
- Vice-Admiral the Hon. Sir Alexander E. Bethell: June 1915–November 1916
- Vice-Admiral the Hon. Sir Somerset A. Gough-Calthorpe: November 1916–July 1917
- Vice-Admiral Sir Cecil F. Thursby: July 1917–July 1918
- Admiral Sir Dudley R. S. de Chair: July 1918–July 1921
- Vice-Admiral Sir Morgan Singer: July 1921–July 1923

=== Admiral Commanding Reserves ===
From 1968 until 1976 this post holder co-held the title, Director-General Naval Recruiting.

- Admiral Sir Hugh H. D. Tothill: July 1923–July 1925
- Admiral Sir Lewis Clinton-Baker: July 1925–August 1927
- Vice-Admiral Sir Arthur A. M. Duff: August 1927–August 1929
- Admiral Sir John D. Kelly: August 1929–August 1931
- Vice-Admiral Henry W. Parker: August 1931–October 1933
- Admiral Sir George K. Chetwode: October 1933–January 1936
- Vice-Admiral Sir H. J. Studholme Brownrigg: January 1936–November 1938
- Admiral Sir Noel F. Laurence: November 1938–January 1941
- Rear-Admiral Vernon S. Butler, 13 January 1941–March 1941 (temporary)
- Vice-Admiral John G. P. Vivian: March 1941–October 1945
- Vice-Admiral Sir Charles E. Morgan: October 1945–October 1947
- Admiral Sir Wilfrid R. Patterson: October 1947–October 1949
- Vice-Admiral the Hon. Sir Guy H.E.Russell: October 1949–October 1950
- Vice-Admiral Sir William R. Slayter: October 1950–June 1952
- Vice-Admiral John A. S. Eccles: June 1952–January 1953
- Vice-Admiral Alan Scott-Moncrieff: April 1953–April 1955
- Vice-Admiral John W. Cuthbert: April 1955–January 1956
- Vice-Admiral Geoffrey Thistleton-Smith: January 1956–April 1958
- Vice-Admiral Sir William Kaye Edden: April 1958–April 1960
- Vice-Admiral Sir R. Alastair Ewing: April 1960–August 1962
- Rear-Admiral Hugh C. Martell: August 1962–April 1965
- Rear-Admiral Geoffrey H. Carew-Hunt: April 1965–April 1968
- Rear-Admiral B. C. Godfrey Place: April 1968–May 1970
- Rear-Admiral Ian D. McLaughlan: May 1970–July 1972
- Rear-Admiral Ian G. W. Robertson: July 1972–August 1974
- Rear-Admiral Hubert W.E. Hollins: August 1974–December 1976

== Assistants/Chiefs of Staff, Reserves ==
Post holders included:

Assistant, Reserves:

- Captain William H. Whyte: November 1879-January 1881
- Captain R. Gordon Douglas: January 1881-January 1883
- Captain Lindesay Brine: January 1883-March 1886
- Captain Charles F. Hotham: March 1886-December 1887
- Captain Edward H. Seymour: December 1887-July 1889
- Captain Francis Durrant: July 1889-January 1891
- Captain Edmund C. Drummond: February 1891-April 1892
- Captain Arthur H. Alington: April 1892-May 1894
- Captain Arthur D. Fanshawe: May 1894-February 1897
- Captain Robert W. Stopford: February 1897-August 1899
- Captain Charles J. Norcock: August 1899-October 1902
- Captain George F. King-Hall: October 1902-July 1903

Chiefs of Staff, Reserves

- Captain George F. King-Hall: July 1903-October 1904
- Captain John E. Bearcroft: October 1904-April 1906
- Captain Thomas P. Walker: April 1906-March 1908
- Captain Frederick A. Warden: March 1908-March 1909
- Captain Richard P.F.Purefoy: March 1909-March 1911
- Captain Mark E.F. Kerr: March 1911-November 1912
- Captain Cresswell J. Eyres; November 1912-April 1913
- Captain Hugh H.D. Tothill: April 1913-December 1914
- Rear-Admiral William H. Baker-Baker: December 1914-January 1916
- Captain Philip H. Colomb: January 1916-February 1917
- Captain Edward L. Booty: February 1917-December 1919
- Captain Vincent B. Molteno: December 1919 – 1921
- Captain George Trewby: February 1920-February 1922
- Captain Edward C. Kennedy: February 1922-March 1923
- Captain Cecil M. Staveley: March 1923-September 1924
- Captain Basil G. Washington: September 1924-September 1926
- Captain Horace W. Longden: September 1926-August 1927
- Captain Ronald Howard: August 1927-August 1929
- Captain Charles G. Ramsey: August 1929-September 1931
- Captain Herbert A. Forster: September 1931-September 1932
- Captain Vernon S. Butler: September 1932-September 1934
- Captain Frederic C. Bradley: September 1934-June 1935
- Captain Kenneth H.L. Mackenzie: September 1935-December 1936
- Captain Leslie H. Ashmore: December 1936-March 1938
- Captain Humphrey B. Jacomb: March 1938-November 1939
- Captain Vernon S. Butler: November 1939-December 1941
- Captain Frederic N. Attwood: December 1941-June 1942
- Commodore John M. Dick: June 1942 – 1946
- Commodore D.A. Carey: July 1943 – 1945
- Commodore Hugh C.C. Forsyth: 1945-1946
- Captain Richard T. White: October 1945-January 1948
- Captain Ian M.R. Campbell: January–December 1948
- Captain William L.G. Adams: December 1948-November 1950
- Captain Alan D.H. Jay: November 1950-March 1952
- Captain Edmund N.V. Currey: March 1952-September 1954
- Captain Archibald J.F. Milne-Home: September 1954-March 1956
- Captain W. Frank N. Gregory-Smith: March 1956-July 1958
- Captain Ronald de L. Brooke: July 1958-June 1960
- Captain Herbert T. Harrel: June 1960-May 1962
- Captain Richard E. Roe: May 1962-May 1964
- Captain Ronald W. Forrest: May 1964-May 1966
- Captain Michael L. Stacey: May 1966-May 1968
- Captain Michael W.G. Fawcett: May 1968-April 1970
- Captain Arthur Checksfield: April 1972-June 1974
- Captain Colin N. MacEacharn: June 1974-March 1976

== Offices under the Admiral Commanding Reserves ==
=== Fleet Reserve ===
Included:

- Captain, Fleet Reserve, Portsmouth (from 1891 until 1905):
- Captain, Fleet Reserve, Devonport (from 1891 until 1905)
- Captain, Fleet Reserve, Medway (from 1891 until 1905)

=== Coast Guard Districts ===
Included:

- Captain, Scottish Coast Guard District (from 1903 until 1920 and from 1922 until 1923)
- Captain, Eastern Coast Guard District (from 1903 until 1920)
- Captain, Southern Coast Guard District (from 1903 until 1920
- Captain, Western Coast Guard District (from 1903 until 1920)
- Captain, North of Ireland Coast Guard District (from 1903 until 1920 and from 1922 until 1923)
- Captain, South of Ireland Coast Guard District (from 1903 until 1920)
- Captain, North of Scotland Coast Guard District (from 1920 until 1922)
- Captain, Rosyth Coast Guard District (from 1920 until 1923)
- Captain, Humber Coast Guard District (from 1920 until 1922)
- Captain, Nore Coast Guard District (from 1920 until 1923)
- Captain, Portsmouth Coast Guard District (from 1920 until 1923)
- Captain, Plymouth Coast Guard District (from 1920 until 1923)
- Captain, Irish Sea Coast Guard District (from 1920 until 1922)
- Captain, Kingstown Coast Guard District (from 1920 until 1922)
- Captain, Queenstown Coast Guard District (from 1920 until 1922)
- Captain Buncrana Coast Guard District (from 1920 until 1922)

== See also ==
- Commander-in-Chief Fleet
- Commander-in-Chief, Portsmouth
- Commander-in-Chief, Plymouth
