= 3rd Cruiser Squadron =

- Active: 1902–1909, 1911–1916, 1922–1941
- Country: United Kingdom
- Allegiance: British Empire
- Branch: Royal Navy

Commanders
- Notable commanders: Rear-Admiral. the Hon. Sir Hedworth Lambton

The 3rd Cruiser Squadron was a formation of cruisers of the British Royal Navy from 1902 to 1909 and 1911 to 1916 and then again from 1922 to 1941.

== History ==
=== First formation ===
The squadron was first formed in June 1902 and disbanded in March 1909

==== Rear-Admiral Commanding ====
Included:

	Rank	Flag	Name	Term	Notes
Rear-Admiral Commanding, 3rd Cruiser Squadron
1	Rear-Admiral	Rear-Admiral - Royal Navy	Sir Baldwin Wake Walker, Bt.	June, 1902 – November, 1904	
2	Rear-Admiral	Rear-Admiral - Royal Navy	the Hon. Sir Hedworth Lambton	November, 1904 – November, 1906	
3	Rear-Admiral	Rear-Admiral - Royal Navy	Sir Henry D. Barry	November, 1906 – October, 1908	
4	Rear-Admiral	Rear-Admiral - Royal Navy	Sir Henry B. Jackson	October, 1908 – March, 1909	
squadron disbanded 04/1909 – 11/1911

=== Second formation ===
The squadron was reformed in December 1911 and disbanded in September 1916.

==== Rear-Admiral Commanding ====
Included:

	Rank	Flag	Name	Term	Notes
Rear-Admiral Commanding, 3rd Cruiser Squadron
1	Rear-Admiral	Rear-Admiral - Royal Navy	F.C. Doveton Sturdee	December, 1911 – December, 1912	
2	Rear-Admiral	Rear-Admiral - Royal Navy	Charles E. Madden	December, 1912 – December, 1913	
3	Rear-Admiral	Rear-Admiral - Royal Navy	William C. Pakenham	December, 1913 – March, 1915	
4	Rear-Admiral	Rear-Admiral - Royal Navy	W.Lowther Grant	March, – July, 1915	
5	Rear-Admiral	Rear-Admiral - Royal Navy	Montague E. Browning	July 1915 – September, 1916	
squadron disbanded 09/1916 – 11/1922

=== Third formation ===
The squadron reformed in December 1922 during the interwar years. It was in operation during World War II and was disbanded in March 1941.

==== Rear-Admiral/Vice-Admiral Commanding ====
Included:

	Rank	Flag	Name	Term	Notes
Rear-Admiral/Vice-Admiral Commanding, 3rd Cruiser Squadron
1	Rear-Admiral	Rear-Admiral - Royal Navy	Sir A. Ernle M. Chatfield	December, 1922 – December. 1924	
2	Rear-Admiral	Rear-Admiral - Royal Navy	John W. L. McClintock	December, 1924 – January, 1927	
3	Rear-Admiral	Rear-Admiral - Royal Navy	Lionel G. Preston	January, 1927 – February, 1929	
4	Rear-Admiral	Rear-Admiral - Royal Navy	Arthur J. Davies	February, 1929 – January, 1931	
5	Vice-Admiral	Vice-Admiral - Royal Navy	Barry E. Domvile	January, 1931 – January, 1932	
6	Rear-Admiral	Rear-Admiral - Royal Navy	Francis L. Tottenham	January, 1932 – April, 1933	
7	Rear-Admiral	Rear-Admiral - Royal Navy	H.J.Studholme Brownrigg	April, 1933 – April, 1935	
8	Rear-Admiral	Rear-Admiral - Royal Navy	George H. D’Oyly Lyon	April, 1935 – March, 1937	
9	Rear-Admiral	Rear-Admiral - Royal Navy	Lionel V. Wells	March, 1937 – March, 1939	
10	Rear-Admiral	Rear-Admiral - Royal Navy	Henry R. Moore	March, 1939 – July, 1940	
11	Rear-Admiral	Rear-Admiral - Royal Navy	Edward de F. Renouf	July, 1940 – May, 1941	
squadron disbanded 05/1941
