= George Hamilton D'Oyly Lyon =

Royal Navy admiral and sportsman (1883–1947)

Admiral Sir George Hamilton D'Oyly Lyon KCB
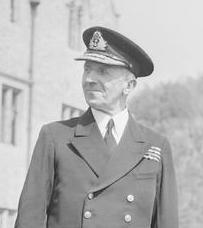
- Lyon in 1943
- Born: 3 October 1883; Bankipore, Bengal Presidency, British India
- Died: 19 August 1947 (aged 63); Midhurst, Sussex, England
- Military career
- Allegiance: United Kingdom
- Branch: Royal Navy
- Service years: 1899–1943
- Rank: Admiral
- Commands: 2nd Destroyer Flotilla; 3rd Cruiser Squadron; Africa Station; Nore Command
- Conflicts: First World War; Battle of Jutland; Second World War
- Awards: Order of the Bath; Order of the Redeemer; Order of Aviz
- Cricket career

Cricket information
- Batting: Right-handed
- Bowling: Right-arm medium

Domestic team information
- Years: Team
- 1907: Hampshire

Career statistics
Competition	First-class
Matches	4
Runs scored	185
Batting average	31.40
100s/50s	0/1
Top score	90
Balls bowled	240
Wickets	7
Bowling average	20.00
5 wickets in innings	0
10 wickets in match	0
Best bowling	4/51
Catches/stumpings	4/–
- Source: George Lyon at Cricinfo

Rugby union career
- Position: Fullback
Senior career
Years	Team	Apps	(Points)
–	United Services Portsmouth		
–	Royal Navy		
International career
Years	Team	Apps	(Points)
1908–1909	England	2	(0)

Admiral Sir George Hamilton D'Oyly Lyon KCB (3 October 1883 — 19 August 1947) was a distinguished Royal Navy officer as well as an English sportsman who played cricket at first-class level and played rugby union at international level for England, captaining the side in 1909. Beginning his career in the Royal Navy in 1899, Lyon saw action during the First World War and following the conclusion of the war, he moved through the senior ranks of the navy, holding various commands, both at the Admiralty and at sea. He would eventually reach the rank of admiral during the Second World War.

== Early life and education ==
The son of George Kenneth Lyon, of the Bengal Civil Service, and his wife, Ellen (daughter of Sir Warren Hastings) he was born in British India at Bankipore in October 1883. He was educated in England at King's School in Bruton, where his uncle was about to become school governor. At King's, he partook in singing and acting, and was active in sports. At the age of 12, he was considered the most promising batsman in the school cricket team, while also playing as a forward for the school football team.

== Naval career ==
Having decided on a career in the Royal Navy, he proceeded to the Royal Naval College, Dartmouth. The year after entering Britannia, he went to sea as a midshipman aboard HMS Crescent. Having been an acting sub-lieutenant, he was confirmed in the rank of sub-lieutenant in October 1902, before being promoted to lieutenant in October 1904 while serving aboard HMS Caesar. In 1906, he was selected to specialise in gunnery. He subsequently served as a gunnery officer aboard HMS Dido, HMS Duke of Edinburgh, and HMS Grafton.

Lyon served throughout the First World War as gunnery officer on board HMS Monarch, during which he was present at the Battle of Jutland. In the closing months of the war, he was promoted to the rank of commander in June 1918. Following the end of the war, he was appointed to the Naval Ordnance Department at the Admiralty in February 1919, before being appointed commander of Portsmouth Barracks in 1921. Lyon was promoted to captain in December 1922, and from 1923 to 1925, he was an assistant director of plans at the Admiralty. From there, he spent two years commanding the 2nd Destroyer Flotilla in the Mediterranean. He returned to the Admiralty as director of physical training and sport in 1927, where he spent two years. From there, he was sent to Greece in 1929 as head of the British Naval Mission to the Hellenic Republic; following the conclusion of his appointment, Lyon was made a Commander of the Order of the Redeemer by the Hellenic Republic.

Lyon attended various senior officers' courses during the early 1930s and was promoted to commodore in July 1932, at which point he was appointed commodore commanding Home Fleet destroyers aboard HMS Centaur. He was promoted to rear admiral in November 1934, and in 1935 he was placed in command of the 3rd Cruiser Squadron until 1937. He was made a Companion to the Order of the Bath in the 1936 New Year Honours. He was decorated by Portugal with the Military Order of Aviz (Grand Cross) in 1938. He was appointed Commander-in-Chief, Africa in April 1938 (one year prior to its reorganisation into the South Atlantic Station), holding this appointment during the opening years of the Second World War. In October 1940, he was appointed a Knight Commander of the Order of the Bath. In 1941, he was appointed Commander-in-Chief, The Nore, and was promoted to admiral in June 1942. He held the post of Commander-in-Chief, The Nore until July 1943 and retired the following month, having been declared medically unfit for service.

== Sporting career ==
=== Cricket ===
Lyon made his debut in first-class cricket for Hampshire against Sussex at Portsmouth in the 1907 County Championship, with him making a second appearance for Hampshire in the same competition against Worcestershire, also at Portsmouth. He would later make two further appearances in first-class cricket, either side of the First World War. The first, in 1911, came for a combined Army and Navy cricket team against a combined Oxford and Cambridge Universities team at Portsmouth, followed in 1922 with an appearance for the Royal Navy against the British Army cricket team at Lord's. His 1911 appearance was his most successful in first-class cricket, with Lyon top-scoring in the Army and Navy first innings with 90, before taking 4 for 51 with his medium pace bowling in the Oxford and Cambridge second innings, which contributed toward a six wickets victory for the Army and Navy. In four first-class matches, he scored 185 runs at an average of 26.42, while with the ball he took 7 wickets at a bowling average of exactly 20.

=== Rugby union ===
Lyon played his domestic rugby union for the Royal Navy and United Services, He was capped twice at international level for England as a full-back. His first Test cap came in a loss to Scotland at Inverleith in the 1908 Home Nations Championship. His second Test cap came the following year as captain against Australia at Blackheath, which ended in another defeat for England.

== Family life and death ==
Lyon was married in 1912 to Helenora Mary Pierson, with the couple having three sons; one of their sons, Patrick Maxwell Lyon, a second lieutenant in the Middlesex Regiment, was killed in action during the Belgian campaign of May 1940. He was diagnosed with pulmonary tuberculosis and multiple sclerosis in 1946, with Lyon dying in August 1947 at the King Edward VII Hospital near Midhurst in Sussex. Following his death, a memorial service was held for him at Chatham Dockyard, which was attended by Admiral Sir Harold Burrough and Air Commodore Alfred Warrington-Morris, amongst others.

Military offices
Preceded by Sir Francis Tottenham	Commander-in-Chief, Africa Station; 1938–1939	Succeeded by Post Disbanded (followed by the South Atlantic Station)
Preceded by New Post (formerly the Africa Station)	Commander-in-Chief, South Atlantic Station; 1939–1940	Succeeded by Sir Robert Raikes
Preceded by Sir Studholme Brownrigg	Commander-in-Chief, The Nore; 1941–1943	Succeeded by Sir John Tovey
Sporting positions
Preceded by Lancelot Slocock	England national rugby union team captain January 1909	Succeeded by Robert Dibble
