= Gunnery Division (Royal Navy) =

UK Navy division (1920–1964)

Agency overview
- Formed: 1920-1964
- Preceding agency: Gunnery and Torpedo Division
- Jurisdiction: United Kingdom
- Headquarters: Admiralty, London
- Agency executive: Director of Gunnery Division Director of Gunnery and Anti-Aircraft Warfare Division
- Parent agency: Admiralty Naval Staff

The Gunnery Division was a Directorate of the Admiralty Naval Staff of the Royal Navy responsible for the tactical use of naval weapons and the training of naval personnel in relation to operational requirements. It was established in 1920 when the Gunnery and Torpedo Division was separated into an independent Gunnery Division and Torpedo Division. It existed until 1964 when the Department of Admiralty was abolished and replaced by a new Ministry of Defence.

== History ==
Prior to 1918 responsibility for naval ordnance and gunnery training lay with Naval Ordnance Department. In 1918 the Naval Artillery and Torpedoes Division was established; in June 1920 it was split up into the Gunnery Division and the Torpedo division. It was created as new directorate of the Admiralty Naval Staff in primarily to deal with questions of the tactical use of these weapons and the training of personnel and to facilitate the clear connection between the use of the weapon and operations. The training and the tactical aspects of weapons constitute a sphere common to the naval staff, the Admiralty technical departments and the fleet. Following on from the lessons learnt during World War I on 19 April 1920 the Gunnery and Torpedo Division was split up and according to author Norman Friedman responsibility for Gunnery initially concerned with fire control was specifically created for a new Director of the Gunnery Division, Naval Staff, Captain Frederic C. Dreyer who was Admiral Jellicoe's chief fleet gunnery officer. In 1928 the Gunnery Division was disbanded from the Naval Staff until the advent of World War II when in 1941 it was re-established as the Gunnery and Anti-Aircraft Division it remained a naval staff division until 1964.

== Directors duties ==
Instructions issued for the Gunnery Division as part of the Naval Staff re-organisation as of 1921 and held by the National Archives (U.K.) included:

A) The Director of the Gunnery Division (D. of. G.D.) will advise on the following:

- Practical gunnery and gunnery exercises.
  - The use of gas and smoke in warfare and counter-measures.
  - The methods of instruction in the Training establishments for carrying out training in the use of:
    - Gunnery weapons,
    - Smoke, gas, anti-gas apparatus.

He is responsible for keeping the Naval Staff in touch with progress and general development of the Fleet in gunnery and chemical warfare and with the method of conducting gunnery and chemical warfare at sea.

B) He will advise on:

- Gunnery policy, both offensive & defensive as affecting design.
- Quantity and distribution of gunnery material so far as tactical requirements are concerned.
- Effect on gunnery policy of technical development and scientific research and progress.
- Air co-operation in gunnery matters.

Note.—Technical advice on the design of gunnery material, chemical warfare material, and material for counter measures is the function of the D.N.O.

C) He is responsible for scrutinising all reports of gunnery practices submitted to the Admiralty for review by Senior Officers and Cs.-in-C., and will advise as to the action necessary:—

- To control the lines on which the various commands are working, and to co-ordinate their work.
- To keep each command in touch with the progress made by others.
- To standardise methods.

D) In matters of material arising from reports of practices, he is responsible for co-ordinating suggestions from various commands and for advising on them from the point of view of practical use and Training, before they are dealt with by the appropriate Department under the Controller.

E) He is responsible for the compilation of records and summaries of Fleet gunnery practices, and for the preparation and periodical revision of the Firing Manual and any other handbook relating to his duties. He is responsible that these embody all general orders for carrying out practices necessary for the acquisition and maintenance of efficiency, and all lessons learnt from action experience and peace practices.

Notes: The responsibility for progress and development in gunnery matters in the Fleets under their command rests entirely with the various Commanders-in-Chief.

F) In conjunction with the Director of Training and Staff Duties, who is responsible for advice on policy and principles of training, he is responsible to the A.C.N.S. for the formulation of requirements of technical gunnery training.

G) He is responsible to the A.C.N.S. for advice on training in the use of gunnery weapons, smoke, gas and counter measures carried out at the Training establishments.

H) With regard to paragraphs 6 and 7, he will keep in close touch with the D.N.O, who is responsible to the Second Sea Lord for advice on complements and Quarter Bills, training in so far as it affects safe working and maintenance of material, and training in diving, and who is responsible to the Controller for advice on material.

Note.—The D. of G.D. is concerned with the use of weapons whilst the D.N.O. is concerned with their preparation for use. These respective spheres of activity meet in the drill which is required to finally prepare the weapon for use. Drill, having the double purpose of producing the best result from the weapon and also of preventing damage or accident due to improper handling of material, is common ground to both D. of G.D. and D.N.O., to whom it is therefore a joint responsibility. Whilst therefore close co-operation between the D. of G.D. and D.N.O,. is always necessary, it is especially so in the domain of drill.

I) He will be responsible for recommending the type and allocation of targets to meet the requirements of the Fleet.

Note.—Designs, repairs, and provision of targets are administered by the Controller's Department.

J). He will at all times maintain close touch with the Director of Torpedo Division respecting suggestions for the employment of new weapons, and with Director of Plans respecting the strategical aspect of all questions referred to him.

K). He will be at liberty to communicate directly with the Commanding Officers of the Gunnery schools on all questions of Training in the use of weapons lying in his sphere as defined by these instructions.

L). He will conform with paragraph 3 of the Instructions for Plans Division.

== Directors of the Division ==
=== Directors Gunnery Division ===
Post holders included:

- Captain Frederic C. Dreyer, 19 April 1920
- Captain Bernard St. G. Collard, 18 April 1922 – 25 April 1924
- Captain Humphrey T. Walwyn, 5 April 1924 – 1 March 1926
- Captain Henry J. S. Brownrigg, 1 March 1926 – 2 April 1927
- Captain Bernard W. M. Fairbairn: April 1927 – December 1928

Note: Division is disbanded from 1929 to 1941

=== Directors Gunnery and Anti-Aircraft Warfare Division ===
Post holders included:

- Captain Gerald M. B. Langley: July 1941 – September 1943
- Captain Edward M. Evans-Lombe: December 1943 – July 1944
- Captain Alex C. Chapman: July 1944 – July 1946
- Captain Robert F. Elkins: July 1946 – July 1948
- Captain George H. Oswald: July 1948 – July 1950
- Captain Edward K. Le Mesurier: July 1950 – August 1952
- Captain John Y. Thompson: August 1952 – November 1954
- Captain Herbert G. T. Padfield: November 1954 – November 1956
- Captain Ian F. M. Newnham: November 1956 – November 1958
- Captain John M. D. Gray: November 1958 – September 1960
- Captain Andrew M. Lewis: September 1960 – September 1961
- Captain Edward W. Briggs: September 1961 – September 1963
- Captain Harry D. Ellis: September 1963 – December 1965

== Deputy Directors of the Division ==
Deputy Directors of the Gunnery Division included:

- Captain Henry J. S. Brownrigg, April 1920 – 10 January 1921
- Captain Henry J. S. Brownrigg, 15 May 1925 – 1 March 1926
- Captain Cyril G. Sedgwick, 1 March 1926 – 25 June 1928
- Captain Harold M. Burrough: July–December 1928

Note: Division is disbanded from 1929 to 1941

Deputy Directors of the Gunnery and Anti-Aircraft Division

- Captain Lennox A. K. Boswell: July 1941 – 1943
- Captain Eric W. Longley-Cook: July 1941 – March 1942 (Gunnery)
- Captain Henry A. King: March 1942 – March 1944 (Gunnery)
- Captain Sir Charles E. Madden, 1943 – November 1944 (Anti Aircraft)
- Captain Stephen H. Carlill: March 1944 – March 1946 (Gunnery)
- Captain W. Kaye Edden: November 1944 – 1946 (Anti-Aircraft)
- Captain Robert A. Currie: March 1946 – May 1948 (Gunnery)
- Captain Michael G. Goodenough: May 1948 – 1949
- Captain George R. Villar: March 1963 – 1965

== Structure of division ==
Included:

- Director of the Gunnery Division-------------Deputy Director of the Gunnery Division
  - Gunnery Division
    - Admiralty Experimental Establishment (AEE), Welwyn (1947–1951)
    - Admiralty Surface Weapons Establishment (ASWE), Portsdown, Portsmouth (1959–1984)
    - Admiralty Gunnery Establishment (AGE), Teddington (1943–1959)
    - Admiralty Research Laboratory-Fire Control Group (1921–1943)
    - Department of Miscellaneous Weapons Development (1941–1945)
    - Inspectorate of Anti-Aircraft Weapons and Devices (1940)
    - Weapons Department (1962–1964)
    - Royal Navy Gunnery Training Schools
      - HM Gunnery School, Devonport.
      - HM Gunnery School, Portsmouth.
      - HM Gunnery School, Sheerness.
    - Royal Navy Gunnery Ranges
      - HM Gunnery Range, Eastney.
      - HM Gunnery Range, Wembury.
    - Royal Navy Gunnery and Anti-Aircraft Training Ships
      - HMS Caroline: Gunnery Training, Belfast.
      - HMS Carrick: Gunnery Training, Greenock.
      - HMS Chrysanthemum II: Gunnery Training ship, moored on the Thames, in London.
      - HMS Claverhouse: Gunnery Training, Leith
      - HMS Eaglet: Gunnery Training, Liverpool.
      - HMS President: Gunnery Training, Thames Area, London.

== Timeline ==
- Board of Admiralty, Naval Ordnance Department (1866–1917)
- Board of Admiralty, Admiralty Naval Staff, Gunnery and Torpedo Division (1918–1920).
- Board of Admiralty, Admiralty War Staff, Gunnery Division (1920–1941).
- Board of Admiralty, Admiralty Naval Staff, Gunnery and Anti-Aircraft Warfare Division (1941–1964)

== Attribution ==
The primary source for this article is by Harley. Simon and Lovell Tony http://www.dreadnoughtproject.org/ Gunnery Division Royal Navy and http://www.dreadnoughtproject.org/tfs/index.php/Instructions for the Director of Naval Artillery and Torpedoes

== Sources ==
- Black, Nicholas (2009). The British Naval Staff in the First World War. Boydell Press. ISBN 9781843834427.
- Friedman, Norman (2014). Naval Anti-Aircraft Guns and Gunnery. Seaforth Publishing. ISBN 9781473853089.
- Mackie, Colin. (2011). "Royal Navy Senior Appointments from 1865". http://www.gulabin.com.
- Rodger N. A. M. (1979), The Admiralty, Offices of State, Terrance Dalton Ltd, Lavenham, England. ISBN 0900963948
