= Hugh Martell =

Royal Navy Vice Admiral (1912–1998)

Vice-Admiral Sir Hugh Martell KBE CB
- Born: 6 May 1912; Penzance, Cornwall, England
- Died: 25 December 1998 (aged 86); Cheltenham, Gloucestershire, England
- Military career
- Allegiance: United Kingdom
- Branch: Royal Navy
- Service years: 1926–1967
- Rank: Vice-Admiral
- Commands: HMS Sluys; HMS Bigbury Bay; 7th Frigate Squadron; Task Force 308; HMS Excellent
- Conflicts: Second World War: Dunkirk evacuation; Arctic convoys; Battle of Okinawa
- Awards: Knight Commander of the Order of the British Empire; Commander of the Order of the Bath; Commander of the Order of the British Empire; Mentioned in Despatches

Vice-Admiral Sir Hugh Martell, KBE, CB (6 May 1912 – 25 December 1998) was a Royal Navy officer who served as Admiral Commanding, Reserves. He is best known for his part as commander of Task Force 308 in Operation Mosaic, the series of British nuclear tests in the Monte Bello Islands in Western Australia in 1956.

== Biography ==
Hugh Colenso Martell was born in Penzance, Cornwall, England, on 6 May 1912, the son of Albert Arthur Green Martell, an engineer officer in the Royal Navy who reached the rank of captain. He had a brother, Colin Colenso Martell, who also became a Royal Navy officer. He was educated at Edinburgh Academy, and entered the Royal Naval College, Dartmouth in 1926.

Martell became an officer cadet on 1 September 1929, and was commissioned as a midshipman on 1 May 1930. He became an acting sub lieutenant on 20 December 1933, with seniority backdated to 1 March 1933, and was promoted to lieutenant on 1 October 1934. As a junior officer, he served on the cruiser HMS Danae, the battleship HMS Warspite, the minesweeper HMS Dundalk and the cruiser HMS Norfolk. In 1937, he posted to HMS Excellent, on Whale Island near Portsmouth, where he qualified as a gunnery officer. On graduation in 1939 he joined the crew of the battleship HMS Nelson as an assistant, where he was serving as an assistant gunnery officer when the Second World War broke out in September.

After Nelson was disabled by a magnetic mine in December 1939, he returned to HMS Excellent. He participated in the Dunkirk evacuation and then joined the cruiser HMS Berwick, on which he served in the Arctic convoys. He married Marguérite Isabelle White, the daughter of Sir Rudolph Dymoke White, 2nd Baronet, on 11 January 1941. They had six children: five sons and a daughter. He returned to HMS Excellent for a refresher course in July 1942, and was promoted to lieutenant commander on 1 October 1942. He joined the crew of the aircraft carrier HMS Illustrious in October 1943, and served with the East Indies Fleet and the British Pacific Fleet. He was promoted to commander on 30 June 1945. He was mentioned in despatches for his service in the Battle of Okinawa.

After the war he became an assistant to the Director of Naval Ordnance, based at HMS President. He received his first command in 1947, of the destroyer HMS Sluys. He served as Commander (G) in the Royal Naval Barracks, Devonport, on the staff of Commander-in-Chief Mediterranean, and as a naval adviser in the Ministry of Supply. He was promoted to captain on 30 June 1952, commanded HMS Bigbury Bay and the 7th Frigate Squadron. In 1956 he was appointed to command Task Force 308, which conducted the Operation Mosaic series of British nuclear tests in the Monte Bello Islands in Western Australia, with the temporary rank of commodore, flying his pennant on the Landing Ship, Tank, HMS Narvik. He was made a Commander of the Order of the British Empire in the 1957 New Year Honours.

Martell attended the Imperial Defence College at Seaford House, Belgrave Square, and returned to HMS Excellent, this time as its commander. He became the Director of Tactical and Weapons Policy in 1959, and as a naval aide-de-camp to Queen Elizabeth II on 7 January 1961. He was promoted to rear admiral on 8 January 1962, and was appointed Admiral Commanding, Reserves, a post hitherto occupied by a vice-admiral. He had to handle the merger of the Royal Naval Reserve (RNR) with the Royal Naval Volunteer Reserve (RNVR). He hoisted his flag on the retiring cruiser HMS Belfast, manned it with a mixed crew of former RNR and RNVR, and sailed it and a small force of coastal minesweepers to Gibraltar for two weeks' intensive training. This was so successful that it became an annual event for many years. He was made a Companion of the Order of the Bath in the 1963 Birthday Honours, and a Knight Commander of the Order of the British Empire in the 1966 Birthday Honours. He was promoted to vice admiral on 16 July 1965. His final posting was as the Chief of Allied Staff, Mediterranean, Aegean and Black Sea. He retired from the navy on 14 December 1967.

In retirement, he worked for the defence electronics firm Racal, and headed the European operations of Penthouse. His first marriage ended in divorce in 1983. He then married Margaret Glover, with whom he had two sons and six daughters. He appeared before the Australian Royal Commission into British nuclear tests in Australia in 1985. He died in Cheltenham, Gloucestershire, on 25 December 1998, on the Christmas Day.
