= Naval Artillery and Torpedoes Division (Royal Navy) =

Former Directorate of the British Admiralty Naval Staff

Agency overview
- Formed: 1918-1920
- Superseding agency: Gunnery Division and the Torpedo Division
- Jurisdiction: United Kingdom
- Headquarters: Admiralty, London
- Agency executive: Director of Naval Artillery and Torpedoes Division
- Parent agency: Admiralty Naval Staff

The Naval Artillery and Torpedoes Division was a Directorate of the British Admiralty, Naval Staff that was created in June 1918 to decide weapons employment policy and also to develop weapon requirements. This division was also responsible for requirements for ship protection against weapons. It existed until 1920 when its responsibilities were divided into two new directorates, the Gunnery Division and the Torpedo Division.

== History ==
In June 1918 the new Naval Artillery and Torpedoes Division was established in-order to decide weapons employment policy and to develop weapon requirements for the Royal Navy. The division was additionally responsible for requirements for ship protection against weapons. In 1920 the division was split up into new departments the Gunnery Division and the Torpedo Division.

== Directors ==
Post holders included:

- Captain Frederic C. Dreyer: June 1918-February 1919
- Captain John W. L. McClintock: February 1919-April 1920
