= 1st Battle Squadron =

Former battleship formation of the Royal Navy

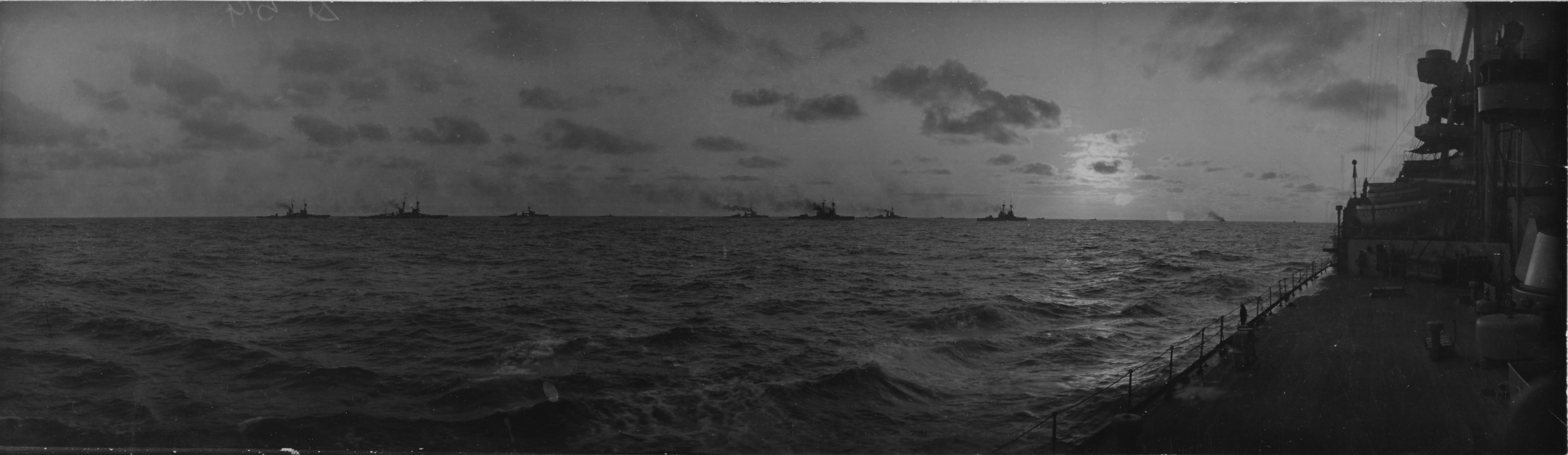
- The 1st Battle Squadron at sea, April 1915
- Active: 1912–1945
- Country: United Kingdom
- Branch: Royal Navy
- Type: Squadron
- Size: 8 x Battleships
- Part of: Grand Fleet

The 1st Battle Squadron was a naval squadron of the British Royal Navy consisting of battleships. The 1st Battle Squadron formed part of the Royal Navy's Grand Fleet during World War I. After the war the squadron became part of the Atlantic Fleet. The squadron changed composition often as ships were damaged, retired or transferred.

== History ==
=== First World War ===
As an element in the Grand Fleet, the Squadron participated in the Battle of Jutland.

==== August 1914 ====
On 5 August 1914, the squadron was constituted as follows:

- HMS Marlborough
- HMS Collingwood
- HMS Colossus
- HMS Hercules
- HMS Neptune
- HMS St. Vincent
- HMS Superb
- HMS Vanguard

==== Battle of Jutland, June 1916 ====
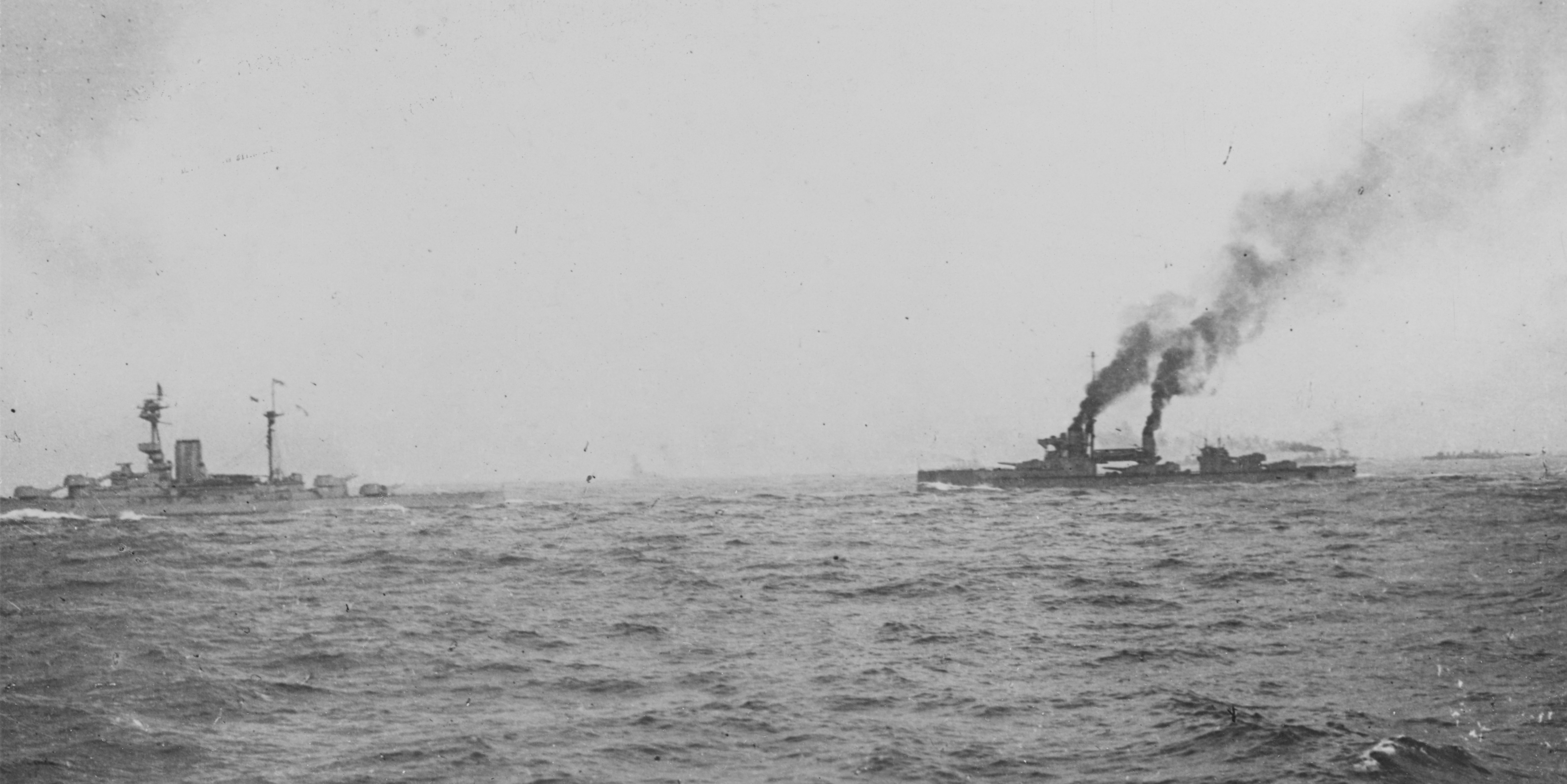
Revenge and Hercules en route to Jutland with the sixth division.

During the Battle of Jutland, the composition of the 1st Battle Squadron was as follows:

- Sixth Division
- HMS Marlborough Flagship of Vice-Admiral Sir Cecil Burney; Captain G. P. Ross;
- HMS Revenge Captain E. B. Kiddle;
- HMS Hercules Captain L. Clinton-Baker;
- HMS Agincourt Captain H. M. Doughty;
- Fifth Division
- HMS Colossus Flagship of Rear Admiral E. F. A. Gaunt; Captain A. D. P. R. Pound;
- HMS Collingwood Captain J. C. Ley;
- HMS St. Vincent Captain W. W. Fisher;
- HMS Neptune Captain V. H. G. Bernard;

==== 1917 and 1918 ====
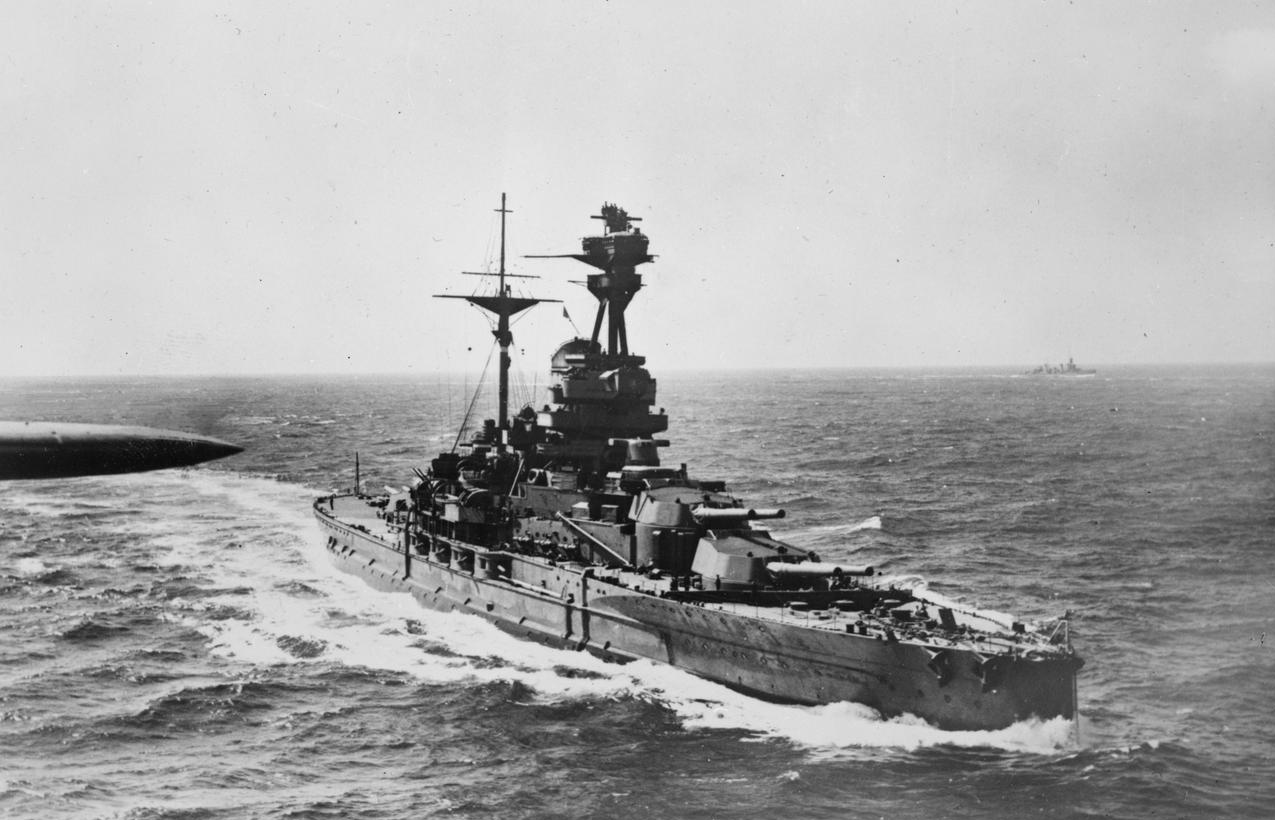
HMS Revenge

Following the Battle of Jutland, the 1st Battle Squadron was reorganized, with Colossus, Hercules, St. Vincent, Collingwood and Neptune all transferred to the 4th Battle Squadron. In January 1917, the squadron was constituted as follows:

- HMS Marlborough
- HMS Agincourt
- HMS Benbow – joined July, 1916
- HMS Canada
- HMS Emperor of India – joined July, 1916
- HMS Revenge
- HMS Royal Oak – joined May, 1916
- HMS Royal Sovereign – joined June, 1916

By 1918, Agincourt had been transferred to the 2nd Battle Squadron, and Resolution, Ramillies and Iron Duke had joined the squadron on completion.

=== Second World War ===
For many years the squadron served in the Mediterranean as the main British battle force there. On 3 September 1939 the 1st Battle Squadron, serving in the Mediterranean Fleet, consisted of Barham, Warspite and Malaya, with headquarters at Alexandria, Egypt, under the command of Vice-Admiral Geoffrey Layton.

In December 1943 the Squadron was under the command of Vice Admiral Arthur Power. In January 1944 the Eastern Fleet was reinforced by HMS Queen Elizabeth, HMS Renown, HMS Valiant, HMS Illustrious, HMS Unicorn and seven destroyers. The Admiralty sent this force out to India under the title of the First Battle Squadron.

From November 1944, the squadron served in the British Pacific Fleet under the command of Vice-Admiral Henry Rawlings, who also served as Second-in-Command of the Fleet. It consisted of HMS King George V, HMS Howe, HMS Duke of York and HMS Anson at various times.

== Admirals commanding ==
Commanders were as follows:

- Vice-Admiral Sir Stanley Colville (1912–14)
- Vice-Admiral Sir Lewis Bayly (June–December 1914)
- Admiral Sir Cecil Burney (1914–16)
- Vice-Admiral Sir Charles Madden (1916–19)
- Vice-Admiral Sir Sydney Fremantle (1919–21)
- Vice-Admiral Sir William Nicholson (1921–22)
- Vice-Admiral Sir Edwyn Alexander-Sinclair (1922–24)
- Rear-Admiral William Fisher (1924–25)
- Rear-Admiral Cecil Staveley (1925–26)
- Vice-Admiral Sir Michael Hodges (1926–27)
- Vice-Admiral Sir John Kelly (1927–29)
- Vice-Admiral Howard Kelly (1929–30)
- Vice-Admiral Sir William Fisher (1930–32)
- Vice-Admiral Sir Roger Backhouse (1932–34)
- Vice-Admiral Sir Charles Forbes (1934–36)
- Vice-Admiral Hugh Binney (1936–38)
- Rear-Admiral Ralph Leatham (1938–39)
- Vice-Admiral Geoffrey Layton (January–November 1939)
- Rear-Admiral Henry Pridham-Wippell (July–October 1940)
- Vice-Admiral John Tovey (October–December 1940)
- Rear-Admiral Bernard Rawlings (1940–41)
- Vice-Admiral Sir Henry Pridham-Wippell (1941–42)
- Vice-Admiral Sir Arthur Power (1943–44)
- Vice-Admiral Sir Bernard Rawlings (1944–45)

== Rear-Admirals, Second-in-Command ==
Post holders included:

- Rear-Admiral Charles E. Madden, 5 January 1912 – 10 November 1912
- Rear-Admiral The Hon. Somerset A. Gough-Calthorpe, 10 December 1912 – 10 December 1913
- Rear-Admiral Hugh Evan-Thomas, 10 December 1913 – 25 August 1915
- Rear-Admiral Ernest Gaunt, 25 August 1915 – 12 June 1916
- Rear-Admiral Alexander L. Duff, 12 June 1916 – 30 November 1916
- Rear-Admiral Sir William C. M. Nicholson, 1 December 1916 – 20 March 1919
- Rear-Admiral The Hon. Victor A. Stanley, 1 April 1919 – 1 April 1920
- Rear-Admiral Henry M. Doughty, 24 March 1920 – 14 April 1921
- Rear-Admiral Sir Rudolf W. Bentinck, 3 May 1921 – 3 May 1922
- Rear-Admiral Arthur A. M. Duff, 3 May 1922
- Rear-Admiral William A. H. Kelly, 3 May 1923
- Rear-Admiral William H. D. Boyle, 3 May 1924 – 3 May 1924
- Rear-Admiral William W. Fisher, 14 October 1924 – 7 September 1925
- Rear-Admiral Cecil M. Staveley, 15 October 1925 – 1 October 1926
- Rear-Admiral David T. Norris, 1 October 1926
- Rear-Admiral Bernard St. G. Collard, 1 October 1927
- Rear-Admiral William M. Kerr, 20 March 1928 – 5 April 1929
- Rear-Admiral The Hon. Reginald A. R. P.-E.-E.-Drax, 12 April 1929 – 26 April 1930
- Rear-Admiral Henry D. Pridham-Wippell, 8 May 1940 – 24 October, 1941
