= Gunnery and Torpedo Division (Royal Navy) =

British weapons development office

Division overview
- Formed: 1918
- Preceding Division: Naval Ordnance Department
- Dissolved: 1920
- Superseding Division: Gunnery Division, Torpedo Division
- Jurisdiction: Government of the United Kingdom
- Headquarters: Admiralty Building Whitehall London
- Parent department: Admiralty Naval Staff

The Gunnery and Torpedo Division was the former Directorate of the Admiralty Naval Staff responsible for weapons policy making, development and assessing weapon requirements from 1918-1920.

== History ==
The Gunnery and Torpedo Division was established on 27 June 1918 it evolved out of the Directorate of Artillery and Torpedoes of the Naval Ordnance Department of the Admiralty and was staff division of the Admiralty Naval Staff department. It existed for only two years until April 1920 when it was split into two separate divisions one specialising solely in Gunnery and the other Torpedo.

== Responsibilities ==
The division was responsible for devising and implementing general system of gunnery and torpedo exercises of the Fleet, in addition to the gunnery and torpedo training of all officers and men, whilst in liaison with the Director of Training. Among its other functions was the training of all personnel in the use of new or existing tactical weapons. It also had to anticipate and plan contingency for any changes in material, in order facilitate new training program's. The division was also responsible for the formulation of requirements of technical gunnery training and for training in the use of gunnery weapons, smoke, gas and counter measures carried out at the training establishments. It was also primarily responsible for assessing and advising on all naval weapons requirements.

== Directors duties ==
As of June 1918:

- Principles and methods of conducting Gunnery and Torpedo practices, including preparation of reports and returns on results, as directed from time to time.
- The use of all Naval Ordnance & Torpedo materiel afloat and ashore, including the expenditure to be allowed for practice & the allowances of Service Ammunition of each type.
- The general direction in which Naval Ordnance, torpedoes, and control equipments require to be developed, in regard to the employment of the weapons in War.
- The most suitable gun and torpedo armament, and protection of all types of vessels & the types and numbers of each type of Projectiles to be carried.
- The Gunnery and Torpedo training of all officers and men, and Gunnery and Torpedo Text-books connected therewith, in conjunction with the Director of Training, advising Second Sea Lord as necessary.
- The D.N.A. & T. will be at liberty to communicate direct with Flag Officers on Gunnery and Torpedo questions of a nature which does not involve Board decision

== Directors ==
Included:
Directors of Naval Artillery and Torpedoes

- Captain Frederic Charles Dreyer, June, 1918 – February, 1919
- Captain John W. L. McClintock, February, 1919 - September 1920

== Assistant directors ==
Included:
Assistant Directors of Naval Artillery and Torpedoes

- Captain Howard John Kennard and Captain Norton Allen Sulivan jointly held this post until December, 1918.
- Captain Patrick Edward Parker May, 1919 - April, 1920.

== Attribution ==
Primary source for this article is by Harley Simon, Lovell Tony, (2017), Gunnery and Torpedo Division (Royal Navy), dreadnoughtproject.org, http://www.dreadnoughtproject.org.

== Sources ==
- Archives, The National. "Records of Naval Staff Departments", discovery.nationalarchives.gov.uk. National Archives, 1912-1964.
- Black, Nicholas (2009). The British Naval Staff in the First World War. Woodbridge: The Boydell Press. ISBN 9781843834427.
- Brooks, John (2004). Dreadnought Gunnery and the Battle of Jutland: The Question of Fire Control. Routledge. ISBN 9781135765545.
- Hamilton C. I. (2011) The Making of the Modern Admiralty: British Naval Policy-Making, 1805–1927, Cambridge Military Histories, CUP, ISBN 9781139496544.
- Rodger. N.A.M., (1979) The Admiralty (offices of state), T. Dalton, Lavenham, ISBN 978-0900963940.
