= Thomas Calvert =

Thomas Calvert may refer to:

- Thomas Calvert (divine) (1606–1679), English Nonconformist divine
- Thomas Calvert (MP) (1755–?) English member of parliament for St Mawes 1792–1795
- Thomas Calvert (professor) (1775–1840), English Anglican priest and theologian
- Thomas Calvert (Royal Navy officer) (1883–1938), English Royal Navy officer of the First World War
