= Admiral Barry =

Admiral Barry may refer to:

- Claud Barry (1891–1951), British Royal Navy admiral
- Henry Deacon Barry (1849–1908), British Royal Navy vice admiral

== See also ==
- John Barry (naval officer) (1745–1803), U.S. Navy commodore, equivalent rank in use at the time
