= 2nd Cruiser Squadron =

- Active: 1904–1919, 1921-1941, 1946-1952
- Country: United Kingdom
- Allegiance: British Empire
- Branch: Royal Navy
- Engagements: Battle of Jutland

Commanders
- Notable commanders: Rear-Admiral Louis Alexander Mountbatten

The 2nd Cruiser Squadron was a formation of cruisers of the British Royal Navy from 1904 to 1919 and from 1921 to 1941 and again from 1946 to 1952.

== History ==
=== First formation ===
The 2nd Cruiser Squadron was first formed in December, 1904 then placed under the command of Prince Louis of Battenberg in February 1905. He was then succeeded by Rear-Admiral Charles Adair on 23 February, 1907. The squadron was first assigned to the Atlantic Fleet until February 1909. In March 1909 it was transferred to the 2nd Division of the Home Fleet till April 1912. From May 1912 until July 1914 it was in the First Fleet. Between August 1914 and November 1918 it was part of the Grand Fleet. The squadron was commanded by twelve Admirals before it was disbanded on 1 February 1919.

=== Second formation ===
The 2nd Cruiser squadron was reformed on 14 May 1921 and was allocated to the Atlantic Fleet until 1932 when that fleet was re-designated Home Fleet. The Squadron was disbanded in 1941.

=== Third formation ===
In October 1946 the 10th Cruiser Squadron of the Home Fleet was re-designated 2nd Cruiser Squadron and was assigned to the Mediterranean Fleet. In 1947 it was re-allocated to the Home Fleet until 1952 when it was dispersed.

== Rear-admirals/vice-admirals/flag officers commanding ==
=== First formation ===
Post holders included:

- Rear-Admiral Prince Louis of Battenberg: February 1905-February 1907
- Rear-Admiral Charles H. Adair: February 1907-September 1908
- Rear-Admiral Sir Percy M. Scott: September 1908-February 1909
- Rear-Admiral Robert S. Lowry: February 1909-November 1910
- Rear-Admiral Sir George J.S. Warrender, Bt.: November 1910-December 1912
- Rear-Admiral Sir F. C. Doveton Sturdee: December 1912-December 1913
- Rear-Admiral Charles E. Madden: December 1913-July 1914
- Vice-Admiral the Hon. Sir Somerset A. Gough-Calthorpe: July 1914-May 1916
- Rear-Admiral Herbert L. Heath: May-November 1916
- Rear-Admiral Sydney R. Fremantle: January-December 1917
- Vice-Admiral Sir Reginald G. O. Tupper: December 1917-February 1918
- Rear-Admiral Edward F. Bruen: February 1918-February 1919

Squadron disbanded

=== Second formation ===
- Rear-Admiral William A. Howard Kelly: May 1925-May 1927
- Rear-Admiral Frank Larken: May 1927-May 1929
- Rear-Admiral the Hon. Matthew R. Best: May 1929-April 1931
- Vice-Admiral Edward Astley-Rushton: April 1931-December 1932
- Rear-Admiral Percy L. H. Noble: December 1932-December 1934
- Vice-Admiral Sir Sidney J. Meyrick: December 1934-December 1936
- Rear-Admiral Thomas F. P. Calvert: December 1936-June 1938
- Vice-Admiral Sir Frederick Edward-Collins: June 1938-April 1940
- Rear-Admiral Alban T. B. Curteis: May 1940-June 1941

Squadron disbanded

=== Third formation ===
- Rear-Admiral Reginald M. Servaes: September 1946
- Rear-Admiral Herbert A. Packer: October 1946-January 1948
- Vice-Admiral the Hon. Sir Guy H. E. Russell: January 1948-May 1949
- Rear-Admiral William Slayter: May 1949-August 1950
- Vice-Admiral Sir C. Aubrey L. Mansergh: August 1950-1952
