= HMS Petersfield =

Minesweeper of the Royal Navy

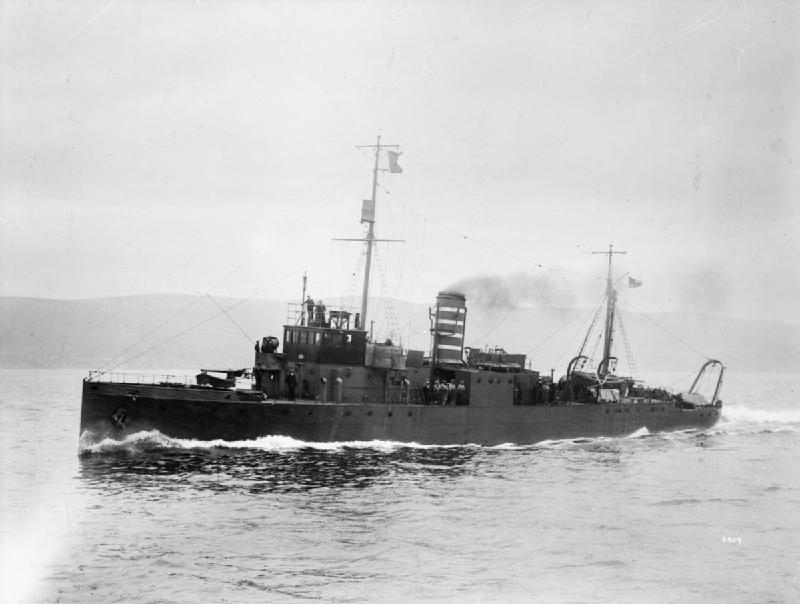

History

United Kingdom
- Builder: Lobnitz, Renfrew
- Launched: 3 March 1919
- Fate: Wrecked 11 November 1931
- Notes: Pennant T.8 / T.21

General characteristics
- Class & type: Hunt-class minesweeper, Aberdare sub-class
- Displacement: 800 long tons (813 t)
- Length: 213 ft (65 m) o/a
- Beam: 28 ft 6 in (8.69 m)
- Draught: 7 ft 6 in (2.29 m)
- Installed power: 2 × Yarrow boilers; 2,200 ihp (1,600 kW)
- Propulsion: 2 shafts; 2 vertical triple-expansion steam engines
- Speed: 16 knots (30 km/h; 18 mph)
- Range: 1,500 nmi (2,800 km; 1,700 mi) at 15 knots (28 km/h; 17 mph)
- Complement: 74
- Armament: 1 × QF 4-inch (102 mm) gun; 1 × 76 mm (3.0 in) anti-aircraft gun

HMS Petersfield (ex-Portmadoc) was a Hunt-class minesweeper of the Aberdare sub-class built for the Royal Navy during World War I. She was not finished in time to participate in the First World War. Re-commissioned at Hong Kong on 23 February 1925 for service on the China Station as an admiral's yacht. She was wrecked on 11 November 1931 off Tung Yung Island, with the C-in-C China Station Admiral Sir Howard Kelly embarked. Two courts martial following her loss resulted in severe reprimands for her Captain, Commander Douglas C. Lang and Navigating Lieutenant, Geoffrey A. H. Pratt, though an imperious meddling throughout the unfolding disaster brought ignominy upon Admiral Kelly, as well.

== Design and description ==
The Aberdare sub-class were enlarged versions of the original Hunt-class ships with a more powerful armament. The ships displaced 800 long tons (810 t) at normal load. They had a length between perpendiculars of 220 feet (67.1 m) and measured 231 feet (70.4 m) long overall. The Aberdares had a beam of 26 feet 6 inches (8.1 m) and a draught of 7 feet 6 inches (2.3 m). The ships' complement consisted of 74 officers and ratings.

The ships had two vertical triple-expansion steam engines, each driving one shaft, using steam provided by two Yarrow boilers. The engines produced a total of 2,200 indicated horsepower (1,600 kW) and gave a maximum speed of 16 knots (30 km/h; 18 mph). They carried a maximum of 185 long tons (188 t) of coal which gave them a range of 1,500 nautical miles (2,800 km; 1,700 mi) at 15 knots (28 km/h; 17 mph).

The Aberdare sub-class was armed with a quick-firing (QF) four-inch (102 mm) gun forward of the bridge and a QF twelve-pounder (76.2 mm) anti-aircraft gun aft. Some ships were fitted with six- or three-pounder guns in lieu of the twelve-pounder.

== First commander ==
Her first commander was Stuart Bonham Carter, who went on to become an admiral.

== Loss ==
The minesweeper with the Commander-in-Chief of the China Station, Vice-Admiral Sir William Kelly aboard, ran ashore on the night of Wednesday 11 November 1931 on the north side of Tungyung Island while on a passage from Shanghai to Fuzhou; it was a total loss. The German steamer SS Derfflinger and the Canadian Pacific liner RMS Empress of Asia went to the Petersfield's assistance, and the county-class cruisers Suffolk and Cornwall proceeded rapidly to the scene. The north-east monsoon was understood to have been raging at the time. The Petersfield was a tender to the cruiser Kent, of the Fifth Cruiser Squadron. Admiral Kelly and 73 officers and men on board were rescued by the Derfflinger.

== See also ==
- Petersfield
- Stuart Bonham Carter
