= Richard Janvrin =

Royal Navy Admiral (1915–1993)

Vice-Admiral Sir Richard Janvrin KCB DSC
- Born: 2 May 1915; Goole, Yorkshire
- Died: 15 January 1993 (aged 77); Chalford Hill, Gloucestershire
- Spouse: Nancy Edyth Fielding (m. 1938)
- Children: 2; including Robin
- Military career
- Allegiance: United Kingdom
- Branch: Royal Navy
- Service years: 1929–1971
- Rank: Vice Admiral
- Nickname: Dick
- Commands: Naval Air Command (1968–70); Flag Officer, Aircraft Carriers (1964–66); Director of Tactical and Weapons Policy (1961–63); HMS Victorious (1959–60); HMS Goldcrest (1958–59); HMS Grenville (1957–58); HMS Broadsword (1951–53)
- Conflicts: Second World War
- Awards: Knight Commander of the Order of the Bath; Distinguished Service Cross; Knight of the Order of Merit of the Italian Republic

Vice-Admiral Sir Hugh Richard Benest Janvrin KCB DSC (2 May 1915 – 15 January 1993) was a Royal Navy officer who served as Deputy Chief of the Naval Staff (1966–68) and Flag Officer Naval Air Command (1968–70).

== Naval career ==
Educated at the Royal Naval College, Dartmouth, Janvrin joined the Royal Navy in 1929 and specialised in aerial observation. He was confirmed as a sub-lieutenant (from acting sub-lieutenant) on 16 January 1936, and promoted to lieutenant on 1 October 1937.

Janvrin served in the Second World War and acted as an observer at the Battle of Taranto in November 1940, serving on HMS Illustrious. For his service, he was awarded the Distinguished Service Cross on 20 May 1941. An acting lieutenant commander at war's end, he was promoted to substantive lieutenant commander on 1 October 1945.

Promoted to commander on 31 December 1948, Janvrin was given command of the destroyer HMS Broadsword in 1951. Promoted to captain on 30 June 1954, he was given command of HMS Grenville and the 2nd Training Squadron in 1957, and the aircraft carrier HMS Victorious in 1959. He was appointed Director of Tactical and Weapons Policy Division of the Admiralty Naval Staff from 1962 to 1963. He was promoted to rear admiral on 7 January 1964, appointed Flag Officer, Aircraft Carriers the same year and appointed a Companion of the Order of the Bath in the 1965 Birthday Honours.

Janvrin became Deputy Chief of the Naval Staff in 1966 and was promoted to vice admiral on 27 November 1967. He was appointed Flag Officer Naval Air Command in 1968, and a Knight Commander of the Order of the Bath in the 1969 New Year Honours. He was placed on the retired list on 15 January 1971.

== Family and later life ==
In 1938 Janvrin married Nancy Edyth Fielding; they had two sons (Simon and Robin).

Janvrin lived at Allen's Close in Stroud in Gloucestershire. He died on 15 January 1993, aged 77.

Military offices
Preceded by Sir Frank Hopkins (As Fifth Sea Lord)	Deputy Chief of the Naval Staff; 1966–1968	Post disbanded
