= Francis Tottenham =

Royal Navy Admiral (1880–1967)

Admiral Sir Francis Tottenham KCB CBE
- Born: 17 August 1880; Fethard, Tipperary, Ireland
- Died: 9 November 1967 (aged 87); Westhill, Bembridge, Isle of Wight
- Military career
- Allegiance: United Kingdom
- Branch: Royal Navy
- Service years: 1895–1940
- Rank: Admiral
- Commands: Africa Station (1935–38); 3rd Cruiser Squadron (1932–33); HMS Rodney (1928–29); HMS Excellent (1926–28); HMS Delhi (1920–22)
- Conflicts: First World War; Second World War
- Awards: Knight Commander of the Order of the Bath; Commander of the Order of the British Empire

Admiral Sir Francis Loftus Tottenham, KCB, CBE (17 August 1880 – 9 November 1967) was a Royal Navy officer who served as Commander-in-Chief, Africa from 1935 to 1938.

== Naval career ==
Tottenham, the second son of Captain Francis Loftus Tottenham, joined the Royal Navy as a cadet in 1895. As a midshipman, he was posted to the battleship HMS Magnificent in early April 1900, while she was posted in the Channel Fleet. He served on the despatch vessel HMS Surprise when he was promoted to lieutenant on 1 October 1902. He served in the First World War with the 4th Battle Squadron. After the war he was a member of the Inter-Allied Naval Armistice Commission and Control Commission in Germany. He commanded HMS Delhi from 1920 and then became naval attaché in Washington D.C. in 1922. He later commanded the shore establishment HMS Excellent and then HMS Rodney. He was made rear admiral commanding 3rd Cruiser Squadron in 1932 and Commander-in-Chief, Africa Station in 1935. He retired as a full admiral in 1940.

== Personal life ==
In 1932, in his 50s, Tottenham married Evelyn Rosalie Prescott Street, the widow of Captain Herbert Street, and only daughter of Harry Ernest Prescott. They had one daughter.

Following Tottenham's death, Sir Douglas Marshall, who served with him in the Second World War, eulogised him in The Times:

He was a man of great personality, devoted to duty and would never compromise on the great principles in which be believed. Probity, honesty, courtesy, and punctuality – these matters mattered to him and upon them his life was built. He had the capacity of bringing out the best in a man. One feels that by his death, although we have lost a treasured friend, much of his example will still live on. He belonged to the Great Britain that raised and led an Empire, fought for freedom and believed in it. In latter years, in spite of pain and discomfort, his indomitable spirit never flagged, his words of encouragement never ceased.

— Sir Douglas Marshall, The Times, 14 November 1967

Military offices
Preceded by Sir Edward Evans	Commander-in-Chief, Africa Station; 1935–1938	Succeeded by Sir George Lyon
