= Naval Ordnance Stores Department =

Former department of the Admiralty

Department overview
- Formed: 1891
- Dissolved: 1918
- Superseding Department: Armament Supply Department
- Jurisdiction: Government of the United Kingdom
- Headquarters: Admiralty Building Whitehall London
- Department executive: Superintendent of Stores
- Parent department: Naval Ordnance Department

The Naval Ordnance Stores Department, was a former department of the Admiralty responsible for the management of naval ordnance storage facilities and depots of the Royal Navy the department was managed by a Superintendent of Stores supported by various deputy and assistant superintendents's it existed from 1891 to 1918 when it was replaced by the Armament Supply Department.

== History ==
In 1891, the decision was taken to divide responsibility for armament provision (for the army and the navy respectively) between the War Office and the Admiralty, with assets (including premises, personnel, equipment and supply vessels) being divided between the two services. For their part, the Admiralty established a new Naval Ordnance Store Department, based at the Royal Arsenal, Woolwich and overseen by the Director of Naval Ordnance, to manage them.

As part of this process, the gunwharves at Portsmouth and Chatham were each divided in two between the Navy and the Army, as were storage facilities at Woolwich Arsenal; at Plymouth the Devonport gun wharf remained with the Army, so a new naval gunwharf was set up within part of the Royal William Victualling Yard. Other ordnance locations (including some which were initially divided) ended up either with one service or the other; those that remained with the Army included Purfleet, Tipner and Weedon ordnance depots.

A memorandum of 18 January 1892 stated that:

... the Official designations of the Naval Ordnance Depots at the undermentioned places will be as follows: Woolwich: H.M. Naval Gunwharf, Woolwich Arsenal; Priddy's Hard: H.M. Naval Magazine; Portsmouth: H.M. Gunwharf; Plymouth: H.M. Naval Gunwharf; Bull Point, Devonport: H.M. Naval Magazine; Chatham: H.M. Naval Gunwharf; Upnor, Rochester: H.M. Naval Magazine.

By the start of the 20th century, however, all these facilities were officially known as Royal Naval Ordnance Depots (as were the smaller depots belonging to the Admiralty, both at home and overseas).

It was only in the last decade of the nineteenth century that gunpowder began to lose its primacy in ordnance manufacture. Cordite was patented in 1889 and soon found widespread use as a smokeless propellant; and from 1896 lyddite began to replace gunpowder in explosive shells. Guncotton (patented in 1846 but little used subsequently due to hazards inherent in its manufacture) eventually came to be used in naval mines and torpedoes. By the end of the century the ordnance depots were being expanded and adapted to provide specialist storage magazines for these explosives, alongside substantial separate storehouses for shells and mines. (Torpedoes, and later mines, were stored in their own separate depots.) The storage requirements of cordite and dry guncotton in particular led to the characteristic layout of depots in the twentieth century: as series of small, individually-traversed, lightly-roofed, single-storey buildings interlinked by narrow-gauge railways.

Several new Depots were established during, or in the run up to, the First World War, including a number in Scotland, where new naval dockyards had opened at Rosyth and Invergordon.

== Superintendents ==
Included:

- Rear-Admiral Sydney Eardley-Wilmot, 25 February 1902 – 1909
- Captain Barrington H. Chevallier Rtd, 1909-1916
- Captain Herbert R. Norbury, 1916-1918

== Ordnance stores ==
Note: ordnance stores were normally located at the following yards and ports and were administered by ordnance officers.

- Alexandria
- HM Dockyard, Chatham
- HM Dockyard, Gibraltar
- Haulbowline
- Hong Kong
- Invergordon
- HM Dockyard Malta
- HM Dockyard, Portsmouth
- Plymouth
- Simons Town
- HM Dockyard Woolwich

== See also ==
- Naval Ordnance Department

== Sources ==
- Semark, H.W. (1997). The Royal Naval Armaments Depots of Priddy's Hard, Elson, Frater and Bedebham (Gosport, Hampshire) 1768 to 1977. Winchester: Hampshire County Council. ISBN 1-85975-132-6.
