= Torpedo Division (Royal Navy) =

British Royal Navy, naval staff

- Active: 1920–1928
- Country: United Kingdom
- Allegiance: British Empire
- Branch: Royal Navy
- Type: Naval Staff Directorate
- Part of: Admiralty Naval Staff (1920–1928)
- Garrison/HQ: Admiralty; Whitehall; London, Great Britain

The Torpedo Division originally called the Gunnery and Torpedo Division was a naval staff organisation of the British Admiralty Naval Staff established in 1920 when the functions of the Gunnery and Torpedo Division was divided up into separate functions. It existed until 1928 when it was absorbed into the Tactical Division.

== History ==
The Torpedo Division was created in 1920 when the role of the Gunnery and Torpedo Division of the Naval Staff was separated into two distinct divisions. Rear-Admiral Arthur Kipling Waistell assumed office on 6 April 1920 he remained in the post until April 1922 when he appointed Rear-Admiral (D), Commanding Destroyer Flotillas Atlantic Fleet. It continued to operate until 1928 when it was amalgamated into the Tactical Division. The division was administered by the Director of the Torpedo Division who in turn was supported by a deputy director.

== Director of the Torpedo Division ==
Included:

1. Rear-Admiral Arthur K. Waistell: April 1920 – April 1922
2. Captain Stanley L. Willis: April 1922 – August 1924
3. Captain Norton A. Sulivan: August 1924 – July 1926
4. Captain Cyril St.C. Cameron: July 1926 – June 1928
5. Captain Henry G. Thursfield: June–December 1928

=== Deputy Director of the Torpedo Division ===
Included:

1. Captain Gilbert O. Stephenson: April 1920 – March 1921
2. Captain Frederick E.E.G. Schreiber: March 1921 – April 1922

== Sources ==
1. Friedman, Norman (2011). British Cruisers: Two World Wars and After. Barnsley, England: Seaforth Publishing. ISBN 9781848320789.
2. Mackie, Colin (2019). "Royal Navy Senior Appointments" (PDF). gulabin.com. C. Mackie.
3. Parkinson, Jonathan (2018). The Royal Navy, China Station: 1864 - 1941: As seen through the lives of the Commanders in Chief. Leicester, United Kingdom: Troubador Publishing Ltd. ISBN 9781788035217.
