= Emily Hester Brodrick =

English writer

Emily Hester Brodrick (née Melvill; 15 April 1846 – 1906) was an English writer. She published novels as Mrs Alan Brodrick.

== Life ==
Brodrick was born at Fort William, Calcutta on 15 April 1846, or 25 April, the eldest daughter of Philip Melvill (1817–1854), eldest son of Sir James Cosmo Melvill, and his wife Emily Jane Hogg, daughter of Charles Hogg. The Melvill family was highly influential in the East India Company. She was baptised on 8 June that year.

In 1867 she married the Reverend Alan Brodrick, who was appointed vicar of Stagsden in the same year. She moved with him to Godalming, where he was vicar from 1875, and then in 1885 to Alverstoke, where she was involved in setting up allotments on the glebe land.In 1901 the couple moved to Winchester when Alan Brodrick became Master of the Hospital of St Cross, in Winchester.

== Works ==
Her writing involved social themes treated from an Anglican point of view. A reviewer in The Academy wrote of one of her novels that: "The Creed of Philip Glyn is a very pleasing little story; and the characters, being ordinary lay people actuated by religious motives, have nowadays the charm of novelty. The plot is not new, and even Philip Glyn with his Gospel of Love has appeared before; but he is the kind of hero one is always glad to meet again, and we should never be tired of seeing the guilty uplifted and purified after their temptation and fall. The creed of Philip Glyn, if it were only practised, would unquestionably make the world cleaner and lovelier than it is."

In 1881 she contributed to The Monthly Packet, edited by Charlotte Mary Yonge, and her stories 'Jim’s Father', 'The Chaplain's Love Story' and 'Cyril's Tutor' appeared in The Lady's Realm in 1903-4.

=== Novels ===
- The Creed of Philip Glyn (1896). Reviewed dismissively by H. G. Wells. The setting on the Gosport peninsula included landmarks such as Gilkicker Tower and Haslar Creek.
- Ananias (1898)
- Joscelyn's Pictures, 2nd edition in 1901 reviewed in The Spectator.

== Family ==
Emily married the Rev. Hon. Alan Brodrick, son of William Brodrick, 7th Viscount Midleton, on 18 June 1867. They had five children:

- Alan Melvill Brodrick (1868–1933), married in 1898 Beatrice, daughter of the barrister Henry Ernst Hall (1845–1918). The marriage was dissolved in 1901. He then married Diana Peacey.
- Mabel Emily (1869–1956) married in 1892 William Lowther Grant.
- William John Henry Brodrick (1874–1964), a barrister.
- George Trevor Brodrick (1877–1902).
- Dorothea Mary (1889–1953), married Hugh Gildart Worsley.

== Death and legacy ==
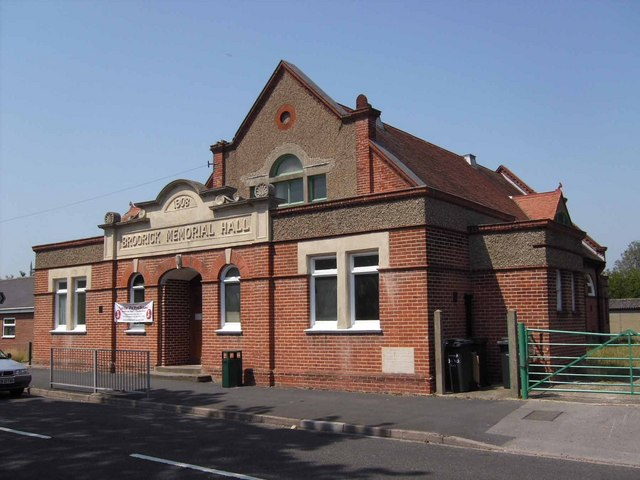
Brodrick Memorial Hall in 2009

Emily Brodrick died in 1906. In 1907 her husband dedicated Brodrick Memorial Hall in Gosport, which he and the parish built, to her memory, and also the restored South Chapel of the Hospital of St Cross.
