= Arthur Waistell =

Royal Navy Admiral (1873–1953)

Admiral Sir Arthur Waistell KCB
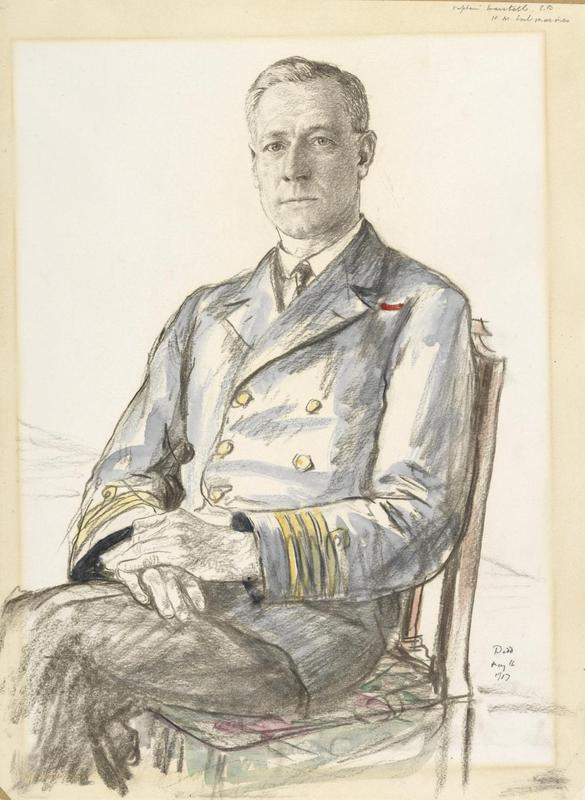
- 1917 portrait by Francis Dodd
- Born: 30 March 1873
- Died: 26 October 1953 (aged 80)
- Burial place: Winchester, Hampshire
- Military career
- Allegiance: United Kingdom
- Branch: Royal Navy
- Rank: Admiral
- Commands: China Station; Portsmouth Command
- Conflicts: World War I
- Awards: Knight Commander of the Order of the Bath

Admiral Sir Arthur Kipling Waistell KCB (30 March 1873 – 26 October 1953) was a Royal Navy officer who went on to be Commander-in-Chief, Portsmouth.

== Naval career ==
Waistell joined the Royal Navy in 1892. He was a lieutenant when in May 1902 he was appointed to the senior staff at the torpedo school HMS Vernon, and from 1 January 1903 he was in command of the HMS Devastation, serving as tender to the Vernon. He was appointed in command of the destroyer HMS Stag in the Mediterranean Fleet in 1906.

He was appointed to command 8th Submarine Flotilla and HMS Maidstone, the depot ship for the flotilla, on 1 September 1913. This was based at Harwich during World War I as the main offensive submarine flotilla in UK waters. The flotilla became the 9th Submarine Flotilla on 9 August 1916. He transferred to command of the battleship HMS Benbow in the Grand Fleet on 29 September 1917.

After the War, on 6 April 1920 he was appointed Director of the Torpedo Division of the Admiralty Naval Staff until April 1922. His next appointment was as Rear Admiral (D), commanding Destroyer Flotillas Atlantic Fleet from 15 July 1922 to 19 April 1923. He was Assistant Chief of the Naval Staff from 1923 and went on to be Commander of the 1st Cruiser Squadron from 1924. He was appointed Commander in Chief, China Station in 1928 and Commander-in-Chief, Portsmouth in 1931; he retired in 1934.

In retirement, Waistell lived in Winchester where he was especially involved with the affairs of the Royal Hampshire County Hospital, for some time being a member of its Court of Governors. His wife died in 1948 and so, being an invalid, he moved to the Isle of Wight where a sister was able to look after him.

He died on 26 October 1953; during the morning of Friday 30 October his funeral service took place at Yarmouth Parish Church, Isle of Wight. Immediately following this service his coffin was borne to the motor torpedo boat Pathfinder and then, in Yarmouth Roads, transferred to the destroyer Finisterre. His remains were taken to Southampton and later that day he was buried beside his wife in Magdalen Hill Cemetery, Winchester.

Military offices
| Preceded by Sir Reginald Tyrwhitt | Commander-in-Chief, China Station; 1928–1931 | Succeeded by Sir Howard Kelly |
| Preceded by Sir Roger Keyes | Commander-in-Chief, Portsmouth; 1931–1934 | Succeeded by Sir John Kelly |
