= Greenham Hall =

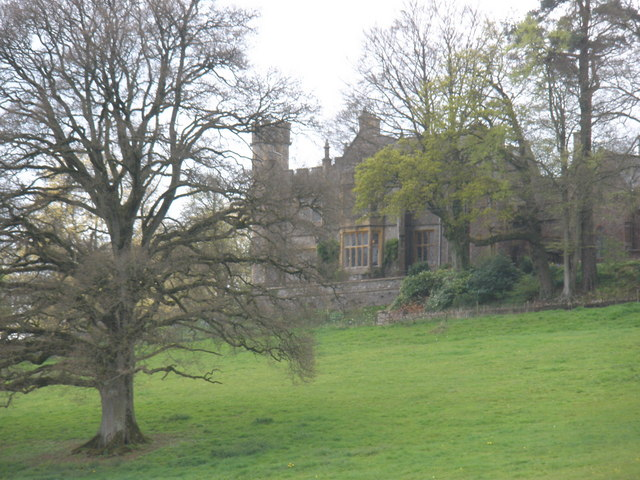

- Location within Somerset
- Alternative names: Tremlett House

General information
- Location: Wellington TA21 0JJ, UK, Wellington, Somerset, England
- Coordinates: 50.97307°N 3.31728°E
- Construction started: 1848
- Owner: Ayre family

Website
- https://greenhamhall.co.uk/

Greenham Hall is a country house Wellington in Somerset. It was once the home of Admiral of the Fleet Sir John Kelly. It is a Grade II listed building.

Originally known as Tremlett House, the main building was constructed in 1848 for Thomas Edward Clarke, a solicitor. It was acquired by the Chapman family in 1880, by Admiral Sir John Kelly in 1920 and was then used as a collecting point for army units during the Second World War. It was bought by the Norman family shortly after the war and then by Henry Ayre in 1970. It is still owned by the Ayre family and became a hotel in 1985.

== History ==
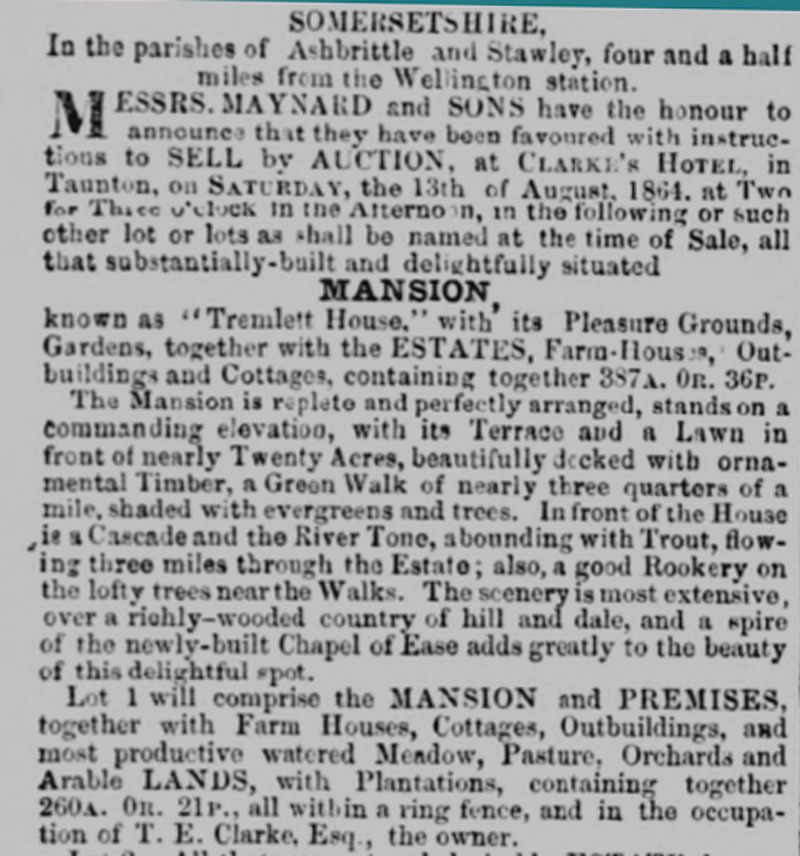
Sale notice for Greenham Hall (Tremlett House) in 1864.

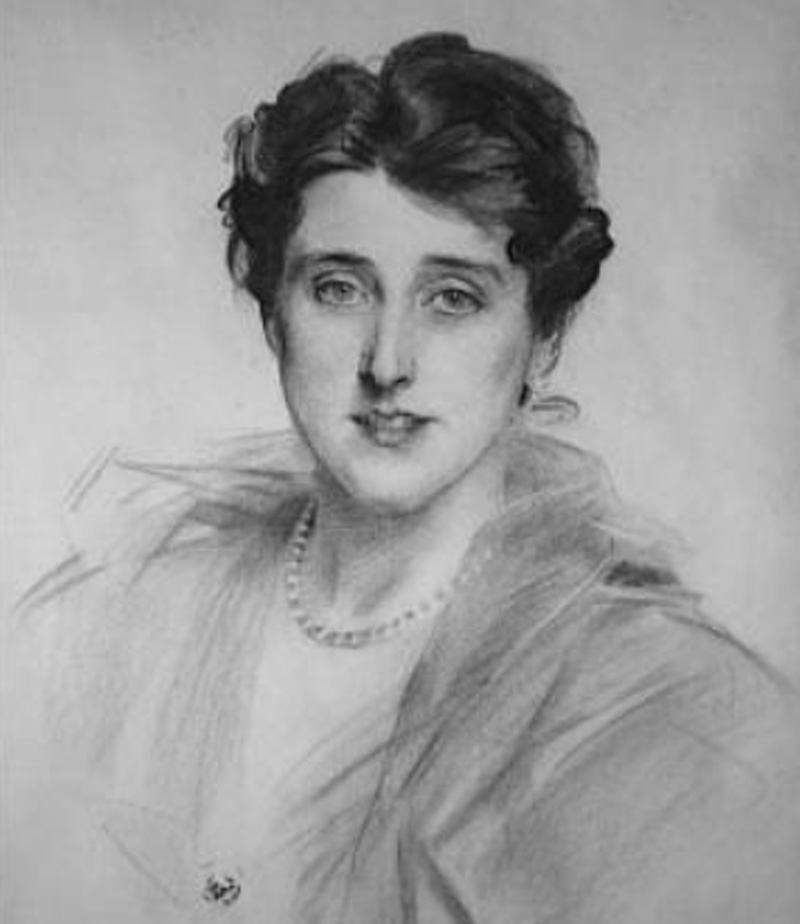
Mary "Maisie" Australie Kelly circa 1910.

The Reverend Thomas Clarke purchased Tremlett House, as it was then known, in 1696.

The house was inherited by Clarke's grandson, Thomas Edward Clarke, a lawyer, in 1840. In 1846 Clarke married Georgina Mary Hall. The couple had four sons and five daughters. Thomas Edward Clarke had the main building rebuilt in 1848. In 1864 Thomas Edward Clarke put the house up for sale and the advertisement is shown. The next residents of the house were the Manley family.

Henry Francis Manley was born in 1830 in Weeford Staffordshire. His father was John Shawe Manley of Manley Hall in Staffordshire and Braziers in Oxfordshire. Henry worked in the Diplomatic Service for many years and in 1871 published a book about his life as a Diplomat called “A continental tour: together with notes and anecdotes of diplomatic life”.

In about 1875 Charles Chapman (1818-1894) bought Greenham Hall. Charles had humble beginnings but became very wealthy. When he was a young man he immigrated to Sydney in Australia and became an oil merchant. He built a very profitable business and, having sold his business, used his wealth to buy Greenham Hall in the 1870s.

Charles died in 1894 and his three sons inherited his property in England. Major George Alexander Chapman (1850-1924) the eldest son appears to be the owner of Greenham Hall. He lived there with his wife Amy Parker Jenkins and his children for many years. The house was sold in about 1920 to Admiral Sir John Kelly who had become Director of Operations at the Admiralty the previous year.

Kelly died in 1936 and his wife Maisie died a year later in 1937. Their daughter Antonia Kelly inherited Greenham Hall. The house was used as a collecting point for army units during the Second World War. Antonia Kelly sold it in 1946 shortly before her marriage to David St Clair Erskine. It was bought by the Norman family and in 1970 passed to the Ayre family.

Greenham Hall is still owned by the Ayre family who since 1985 have provided bed and breakfast accommodation.
