= Lowther Grant =

British Royal Navy Admiral (1864–1929)

Admiral Sir Lowther Grant KCB
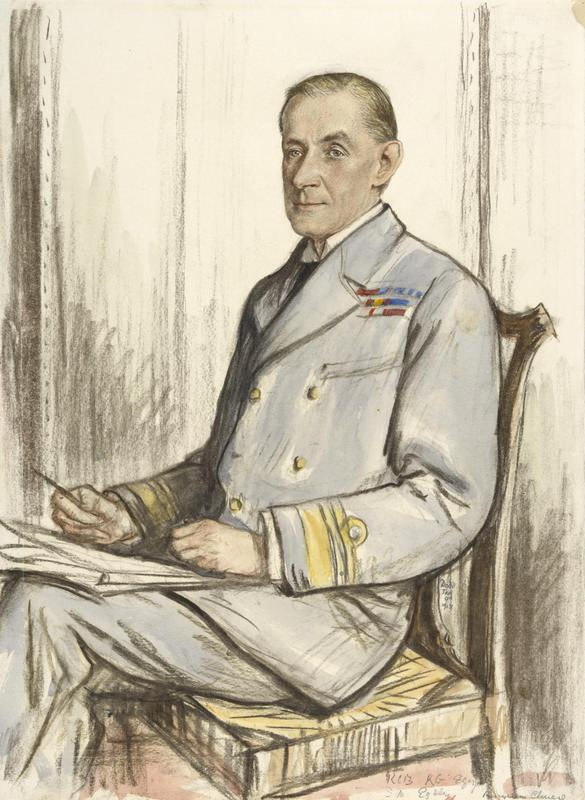
- Vice-admiral Sir William Lowther Grant by Francis Dodd
- Born: William Lowther Grant; 10 November 1864; Southsea, Portsea Island, England
- Died: 30 January 1929 (aged 64); West Malling, Kent, England
- Military career
- Allegiance: United Kingdom
- Branch: Royal Navy
- Service years: 1877–1920
- Rank: Admiral
- Commands: HMS Cornwallis; 6th and 3rd Cruiser Squadrons; China Station; North America and West Indies Station
- Conflicts: Anglo-Egyptian War; World War I
- Awards: Knight Commander of the Order of the Bath

Admiral Sir William Lowther Grant KCB (10 November 1864 – 30 January 1929) was a Royal Navy officer who served as Commander-in-Chief, North America and West Indies Station.

== Naval career ==
Grant joined the Royal Navy in 1877, and served in the Anglo-Egyptian War in 1882. He was later Commander on board HMS Doris, flagship of the Commander-in-Chief, Cape of Good Hope Station, Admiral Sir Robert Hastings Harris, and was in January 1900 landed in Cape Colony to take part in the Second Boer War. During the next months he commanded a detachment of guns operating in the Orange River Colony, and was specially promoted to captain on 21 October 1900 for services during the war.

Still in South Africa, he was appointed in command of the guardship at Simons Town, the elderly ironclad masted turret ship HMS Monarch on 5 May 1902. After the end of the Second Boer war, he was appointed Naval Advisor to the Inspector-General of Fortifications, and left South Africa on SS Britannic in early October 1902 to take up the position on his return the following month. Appointment as Assistant to the Director of Naval Intelligence followed in 1908, before he became rear admiral providing special service with the Home Fleet in 1910. He served in World War I initially commanding the 6th Cruiser Squadron with cruiser HMS Drake as his flagship. He was made Commander-in-Chief, China Station in 1916 and Commander-in-Chief, North America and West Indies Station in 1918. He retired in 1920.

In retirement he sought to justify Admiral Lord Jellicoe's actions at the Battle of Jutland in the face of German criticism.

== Family ==
In 1892, Grant married Mabel Emily Brodrick, daughter of the Rev. Henry Brodrick and Emily Hester Brodrick.

Military offices
Preceded by Sir Martyn Jerram	Commander-in-Chief, China Station; 1916–1917	Succeeded by Sir Frederick Tudor
Preceded by Sir Montague Browning	Commander-in-Chief, North America and West Indies Station; 1918–1919	Succeeded by Sir Morgan Singer
