= Howard Kelly (Royal Navy officer) =

Royal Navy Admiral (1873–1952)

Admiral Sir Howard Kelly GBE KCB CMG MVO
- Born: 6 September 1873
- Died: 14 September 1952 (aged 79)
- Military career
- Allegiance: United Kingdom
- Branch: Royal Navy
- Service years: 1886 – 1944
- Rank: Admiral
- Commands: HMS Gloucester; 8th Light Cruiser Squadron; British Adriatic Force; 1st Battle Squadron; 2nd Cruiser Squadron; 1st Battle Squadron; China Station
- Conflicts: World War I World War II
- Awards: Knight Grand Cross of the Order of the British Empire; Knight Commander of the Order of the Bath; Companion of the Order of St Michael and St George; Member of the Royal Victorian Order

Admiral Sir William Archibald Howard Kelly (6 September 1873 – 14 September 1952) was a Royal Navy officer who served as Commander-in-Chief, China Station.

== Naval career ==
Kelly joined the Royal Navy in 1886. He was posted as a lieutenant to the protected cruiser HMS Spartiate in late March 1902, went to Somaliland in 1902 and became naval attaché in Paris in 1911.

He served in the First World War as commanding officer of HMS Gloucester, taking part in the pursuit of Goeben and Breslau (his brother John Kelly was commanding officer of Gloucester's sister ship Dublin during the same engagement). From 1917 he was commander of the 8th Light Cruiser Squadron. In 1918 he was given command of the British Adriatic Force.

In May 1919, First Sea Lord Rosslyn Wemyss appointed Kelly as head of British Naval Mission to Greece. Kelly discovered the Hellenic Navy in a run down condition after the Allies had emptied its stores during the course of World War I without paying any compensation. Kelly went on to reorganize the Wireless Telegraphy Service and establish the Hydrographic and a Naval Works Department. The gunlayer, rangetaker and instructor naval ratings were introduced; while conscript intakes were increased from two to three per year. A new scheme for treating malaria and venereal diseases was implemented in the navy. Naval regulations and instructions were systematically revised and Greek officers were selected to be trained in British naval schools. Kelly's mission concluded in October 1921.

He became Commander of the 1st Battle Squadron in the Atlantic Fleet in 1923 and commander of the 2nd Cruiser Squadron in 1925. He went on to be Admiralty representative to the League of Nations in 1927 and commander of the 1st Battle Squadron and second-in-command of the Mediterranean Fleet in 1929. His last appointment was intended to be Commander-in-Chief, China Station in 1931. He was on board the minesweeper HMS Petersfield when it ran aground at Tungyung Island in November 1931 – all aboard were rescued. Then, following the 28 January Incident, he used his influence to seek a ceasefire between the Chinese and Japanese forces. He retired in 1936.

He was recalled in 1940, during the Second World War, to be British Naval Representative in Turkey; he retired again in 1944.

== Sources ==
- Fotakis, Zisis (2006). "The Kelly naval mission to Greece, May 1919–October 1921". Byzantine and Modern Greek Studies. 30 (2). Routledge: 185–199. doi:10.1179/030701306X115832. ISSN 1749-625X. S2CID 153764477.

Military offices
Preceded by Sir Arthur Waistell	Commander-in-Chief, China Station; 1931–1933	Succeeded by Sir Frederic Dreyer
