= Cecil Staveley =

Royal Navy Admiral (1874–1934)

Admiral Cecil Staveley CB CMG
- Born: 3 April 1874
- Died: 27 May 1934 (aged 60)
- Military career
- Allegiance: United Kingdom
- Branch: Royal Navy
- Rank: Admiral
- Commands: HMS Endymion; HMS Conqueror; HMS Valiant; 1st Battle Squadron
- Conflicts: World War I
- Awards: Companion of the Order of the Bath; Companion of the Order of St Michael and St George

Admiral Cecil Minet Staveley, CB, CMG (3 April 1874 – 27 May 1934) was a Royal Navy officer who became Commander of the 1st Battle Squadron.

== Naval career ==
Staveley was born the son of General Sir Charles Staveley, but did not follow his father and joined the Royal Navy. While serving as a lieutenant, he was in September 1902 posted to the Naval School of Telegraphy at HMS Victory, for a signals course, then the following month to the torpedo school at HMS Vernon for a short gunnery and torpedo course. He was reassigned to the new armoured cruiser HMS Drake on 13 January 1903, as she took up her first commission in the Channel Fleet.

Staveley served in World War I becoming commanding officer of the cruiser HMS Endymion in January 1916 and Chief of Staff, The Nore in April 1918. He went on to be commanding officer of the battleship HMS Conqueror in November 1920, commanding officer of the battleship HMS Valiant in April 1921 and Chief Staff Officer for the Reserves in March 1923. He was made a CB in the 1924 Birthday Honours.

His last appointment was as commander of the 1st Battle Squadron in March 1926. He was promoted to vice-admiral on 25 May 1929 and put on the Retired list the following day. He was promoted to admiral on the Retired list in September 1933.

Staveley was elected a Fellow of the Royal Geographical Society (FRGS) in December 1902.

== Family ==
In 1919 Staveley married Margaret Adela Sturdee, daughter of Admiral of the Fleet Sir Doveton Sturdee.
