= Thomas Calvert (Royal Navy officer) =

Royal Navy officer

Rear-Admiral Thomas Calvert CB CVO DSO
- Calvert in 1935
- Born: Thomas Frederick Parker Calvert; 1883
- Died: 1938 (aged 54–55)
- Military career
- Allegiance: United Kingdom
- Branch: Royal Navy
- Rank: Rear-Admiral
- Commands: HMS Frobisher; HMS Renown; 2nd Cruiser Squadron
- Conflicts: World War I

Thomas Frederick Parker Calvert (1883–1938) was a Royal Navy officer who served during the First World War.

Calvert commanded the heavy cruiser Frobisher in 1926–1928 and then the battlecruiser Renown in 1932–1933. He was in command of the 2nd Cruiser Squadron from 1936 until his death in 1938.

== Bibliography ==
- Halpern, Paul G., ed. (2016). The Mediterranean Fleet, 1930–1939. Publications of the Navy Records Society. Vol. 163. London: Routledge for the Navy Records Society. ISBN 978-1-4724-7597-8.
