= John Kelly (Royal Navy officer) =

Royal Navy Admiral of the Fleet (1871–1936)

Admiral of the Fleet Sir John Kelly GCB GCVO
- Kelly in 1926
- Born: John Donald Kelly; 13 July 1871; Southsea, Hampshire
- Died: 4 November 1936 (aged 65); Marylebone, London
- Burial place: Buried at sea
- Military career
- Allegiance: United Kingdom
- Branch: Royal Navy
- Service years: 1884–1936
- Rank: Admiral of the Fleet
- Commands: HMS Hermione; HMS Dublin; HMS Devonshire; HMS Weymouth; HMS Princess Royal; 4th Battle Squadron; 1st Battle Squadron; Atlantic Fleet; Home Fleet
- Conflicts: First World War
- Awards: Knight Grand Cross of the Order of the Bath; Knight Grand Cross of the Royal Victorian Order

Admiral of the Fleet Sir John Donald Kelly GCB, GCVO (13 July 1871 – 4 November 1936) was a Royal Navy officer. He served in the First World War as commanding officer of the cruiser HMS Dublin which came close to intercepting the German battlecruiser SMS Goeben. After the War he took charge of a naval force dispatched to strengthen the Mediterranean Fleet during the Chanak Crisis. After serving as Fourth Sea Lord and then commander of the 1st Battle Squadron, Kelly, known for his skill in personnel matters, was asked to take command of the Atlantic Fleet in the aftermath of the Invergordon Mutiny. He rapidly restored discipline and issued a report which was quite critical of the Admiralty Board's handling of the pay cuts issue in the first place. He went on to be Commander-in-Chief, Portsmouth.

== Naval career ==
=== Early career ===
Born the second son of Lieutenant-Colonel Henry Holdworth Kelly of the Royal Marine Artillery and Elizabeth Kelly (née Collum), Kelly joined the training ship HMS Britannia as a cadet on 15 January 1884. Promoted to midshipman on 15 November 1886, he joined the corvette HMS Calliope in January 1887. He transferred to the armoured frigate HMS Agincourt in the Channel Squadron in August 1888, to the battleship HMS Anson in the Channel Squadron in May 1889 and then to the corvette HMS Volage in the Training Squadron in September 1889. Promoted to sub-lieutenant on 14 February 1891 and to lieutenant on 31 December 1893, he joined the cruiser HMS Katoomba on the Australia Station in February 1894. He transferred to the cruiser HMS Royal Arthur, flagship of the Australia Station, in November 1897 and, after qualifying in gunnery at the gunnery school HMS Excellent in 1901, he became gunnery officer in HMS Forte on the Cape of Good Hope and West Coast of Africa Station and saw action in her during the Second Boer War.

Promoted to commander on 30 June 1904, Kelly became Executive Officer in the armoured cruiser HMS Sutlej on the China Station in November 1904, Executive Officer in the cruiser HMS Hawke in the Reserve Fleet in 1906 and Executive Officer in the battleship HMS Cornwallis in the Atlantic Fleet in January 1907. He went on to be a member of the teaching staff at the Royal Naval College, Dartmouth in July 1908 and, having been promoted to captain on 22 June 1911, he became a member of the teaching staff at the Royal Naval War College in October 1912 and Captain of the School of Physical Training at Portsmouth in January 1913. He then became commanding officer of the light cruiser HMS Hermione in the Home Fleet in April 1914 and commanding officer of the cruiser HMS Dublin in the Mediterranean Fleet in July 1914.

=== First World War ===
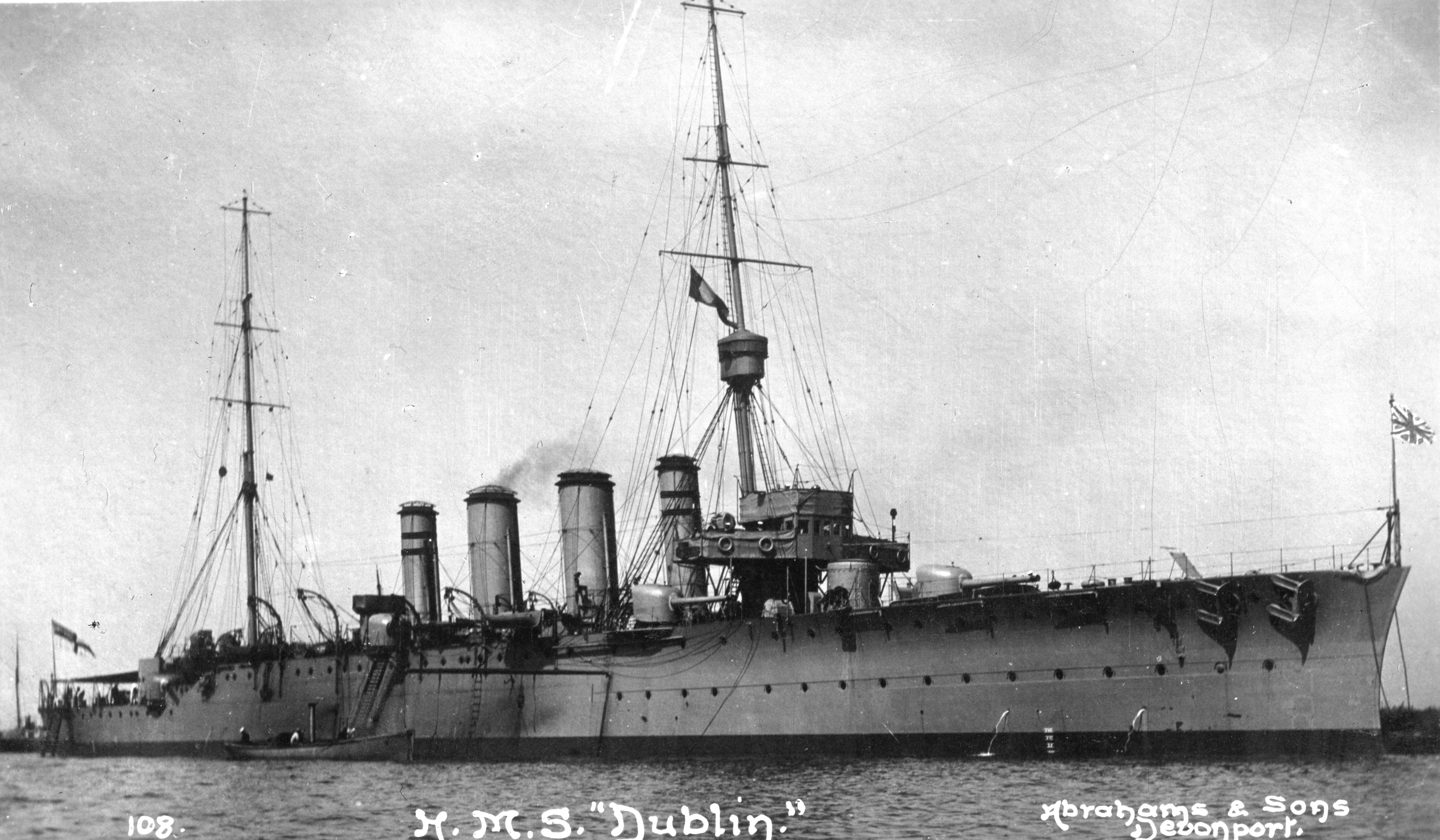
The cruiser, HMS Dublin, commanded by Kelly during the First World War

Kelly served in the First World War: on 4 August 1914 he was assigned, as commanding officer of HMS Dublin, by Sir Berkeley Milne to shadow the German squadron under Rear-Admiral Wilhelm Souchon, consisting of the cruiser SMS Breslau and the battlecruiser SMS Goeben. Kelly did so, but eventually lost sight of the German ships. Kelly's younger brother Howard, commanding the cruiser HMS Gloucester, also became involved in the subsequent chase. HMS Dublin re-encountered the Germans at 1.30 a.m. on 6 August 1914 while sailing to join Rear-Admiral Ernest Troubridge's squadron, and passed news of the sighting to his brother and to Troubridge, before losing them again. Howard Kelly continued to shadow the Germans, and at 8.30 p.m. Milne ordered HMS Dublin, sailing in company with two destroyers, to launch a torpedo attack that night. Using the reports from HMS Gloucester of the Germans' speed and course, HMS Dublin and the destroyers took up position on the Germans' bow, and waited to intercept them. They hoped to make contact at 3.30 a.m. on the morning of 7 August 1914, but the British had been spotted by SMS Breslau, which warned SMS Goeben. The Germans passed unseen to starboard.

Kelly became commanding officer of the cruiser HMS Devonshire in the Grand Fleet in March 1916 and was appointed a Commander of the Order of the Crown of Italy on 5 June 1916. He went on to be commanding officer of the cruiser HMS Weymouth in the Grand Fleet in September 1916 and commanding officer of the battlecruiser HMS Princess Royal also in the Grand Fleet in July 1917. He was appointed a Companion of the Order of the Bath on 1 January 1919, appointed an officer of the French Legion of Honour on 27 May 1919 and awarded the French Croix de Guerre on 4 May 1920.

=== Post war ===
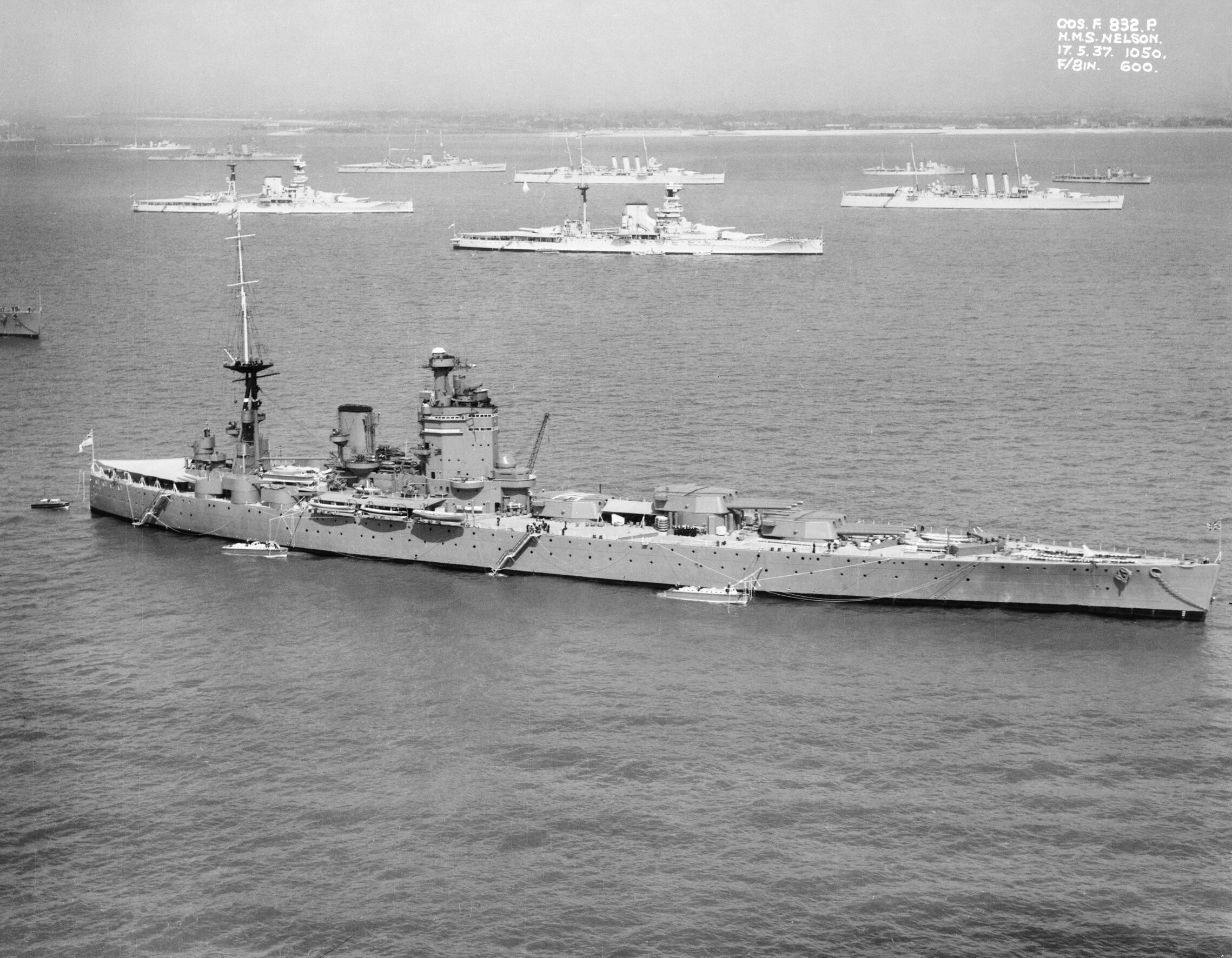
The battleship, HMS Nelson, Kelly's flagship as Commander-in-Chief Home Fleet

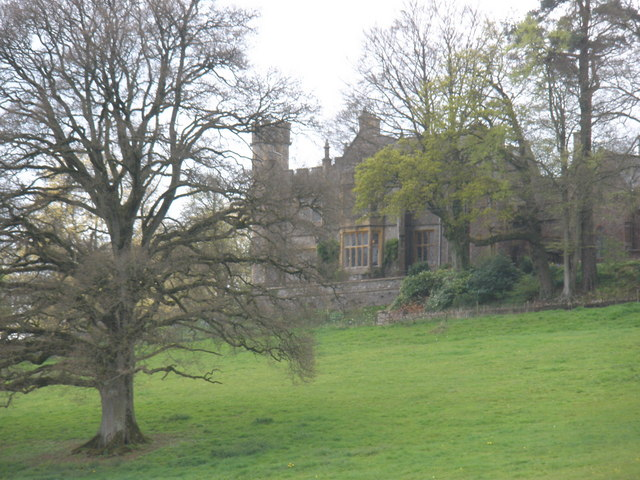
Greenham Hall, Kelly's home in Somerset

Kelly became Director of Operations at the Admiralty in July 1919 and acquired Greenham Hall at Wellington in Somerset for use as a country home in 1920. He was appointed a naval aide-de-camp to the King on 21 March 1921. Promoted to rear admiral on 21 November 1921, he became commander of the 4th Battle Squadron in July 1922 and took charge of a naval force dispatched to strengthen the Mediterranean Fleet during the Chanak Crisis in September 1922.

Kelly became Fourth Sea Lord in April 1924 and, having been promoted to vice-admiral on 25 October 1926, became commander of the 1st Battle Squadron and second-in-command of the Mediterranean Fleet with his flag in the battleship HMS Warspite in April 1927. He became the admiral commanding the reserves in August 1929 and was advanced to Knight Commander of the Order of the Bath on 3 June 1929 before being promoted to full admiral on 12 December 1930. In September 1931 the National Government led by Prime Minister Ramsay MacDonald decided to reduce the wages of all public sector employees: the wage reduction in the Royal Navy was particularly severe and led directly to the Invergordon Mutiny later that month. In the aftermath of the mutiny Kelly, known for his skill in personnel matters, was asked to take command of the Atlantic Fleet in October 1931. He insisted that the mutineers be transferred out of the fleet and his fleet be renamed the Home Fleet before he took up his new command flying his flag in the battleship HMS Nelson. He rapidly restored discipline and issued a report which was quite critical of the Admiralty Board's handling of the pay cuts issue in the first place.

Kelly was appointed a Knight Grand Cross of the Royal Victorian Order on 13 July 1932 and also First and Principal Naval Aide-de-Camp on 31 July 1934. He went on to be Commander-in-Chief, Portsmouth in January 1935, was advanced to Knight Grand Cross of the Order of the Bath on 3 June 1935 and attended the funeral of King George V in January 1936. Promoted to Admiral of the Fleet on 12 July 1936, Kelly died at a nursing home at Marylebone in London on 4 November 1936 and was buried at sea at a ceremony on board the cruiser HMS Curacoa on 7 November 1936. The destroyer HMS Kelly was named after him.

== Family ==
In 1915 Kelly married Mary Kelly from Sydney, the sister of the composer and rower Frederick Septimus Kelly; they had a daughter.

== Sources ==
- Bennett, Geoffrey (2001). Naval Battles of the First World War. London: Penguin. ISBN 0-141-39087-5.
- Heathcote, Tony (2002). The British Admirals of the Fleet 1734 – 1995. Pen & Sword. ISBN 0-85052-835-6.
- Hough, Richard (1989). The Great War at Sea: 1914–1918. Oxford: Oxford University Press. ISBN 0-19-285181-0.
- Massie, R. K. (2005) [2004]. Castles of Steel: Britain, Germany and the Winning of the Great War at Sea (pbk. Pimlico Random House ed.). London: Jonathan Cape. ISBN 978-1-84413-411-3.

Military offices
Preceded by The Hon. Algernon Boyle	Fourth Sea Lord; 1924–1927	Succeeded by Sir William Fisher
Preceded by Sir Michael Hodges	Commander-in-Chief, Atlantic Fleet; 1931–1932	Succeeded by Post disbanded
Preceded by New Post	Commander-in-Chief, Home Fleet; 1932–1933	Succeeded by Sir William Boyle
Preceded by Sir Arthur Waistell	Commander-in-Chief, Portsmouth; 1934–1936	Succeeded by Sir William Fisher
Honorary titles
Preceded by Sir Reginald Tyrwhitt, Bt.	First and Principal Naval Aide-de-Camp; 1934–1936	Succeeded by The Earl of Cork and Orrery
