= HMS Dundalk =

Minesweeper of the Royal Navy

Coordinates: 52°3′N 1°48′E

History

United Kingdom
- Builder: Clyde Shipbuilding Co
- Launched: 31 January 1919
- Identification: Pennant number: J60
- Fate: Mined 16 October 1940, foundered under tow 17 October 1940 off Harwich at South Cutler Buoy

General characteristics
- Class & type: Hunt-class minesweeper, Aberdare sub-class
- Displacement: 800 long tons (813 t)
- Length: 213 ft (65 m) o/a
- Beam: 28 ft 6 in (8.69 m)
- Draught: 7 ft 6 in (2.29 m)
- Installed power: 2 × Yarrow boilers; 2,200 ihp (1,600 kW)
- Propulsion: 2 shafts; 2 vertical triple-expansion steam engines
- Speed: 16 knots (30 km/h; 18 mph)
- Range: 1,500 nmi (2,800 km; 1,700 mi) at 15 knots (28 km/h; 17 mph)
- Complement: 74
- Armament: 1 × QF 4-inch (102 mm) gun; 1 × 76 mm (3.0 in) anti-aircraft gun

HMS Dundalk was a Hunt-class minesweeper of the Aberdare sub-class built for the Royal Navy during World War I. She was not finished in time to participate in the First World War and sank after striking a mine in 1940.

== Design and description ==
The Aberdare sub-class were enlarged versions of the original Hunt-class ships with a more powerful armament. The ships displaced 800 long tons (810 t) at normal load. They had a length between perpendiculars of 220 feet (67.1 m) and measured 231 feet (70.4 m) long overall. The Aberdares had a beam of 26 feet 6 inches (8.1 m) and a draught of 7 feet 6 inches (2.3 m). The ships' complement consisted of 74 officers and ratings.

The ships had two vertical triple-expansion steam engines, each driving one shaft, using steam provided by two Yarrow boilers. The engines produced a total of 2,200 indicated horsepower (1,600 kW) and gave a maximum speed of 16 knots (30 km/h; 18 mph). They carried a maximum of 185 long tons (188 t) of coal which gave them a range of 1,500 nautical miles (2,800 km; 1,700 mi) at 15 knots (28 km/h; 17 mph).

The Aberdare sub-class was armed with a quick-firing (QF) four-inch (102 mm) gun forward of the bridge and a QF twelve-pounder (76.2 mm) anti-aircraft gun aft. Some ships were fitted with six- or three-pounder guns in lieu of the twelve-pounder.

== Construction and career ==
HMS Dundalk was built by the Clyde Shipbuilding Company. In July 1937, Dundalk was recommissioned for the 3rd Minesweeping Flotilla in Malta. On arrival she was placed in Reserve and recommissioned in 1939, returning to England to work on the East Coast.

On 31 May 1940, Dundalk took part in the Dunkirk evacuation to Margate with 500 British troops. She sailed back to Dunkirk and on 1 June was attacked by 12 Messerschmitt aircraft. Dundalk then sailed back to Margate giving assistance to the Havant en route. She arrived at Margate at 12.15 on 1 June and disembarked 280 troops. She returned to Dunkirk, embarked about 450 French troops and arrived back at Folkestone on 3 June. The ship was mined on 16 October 1940 and foundered under tow the following day off Harwich at South Cutler Buoy.
