= William Slayter =

British-American Royal Navy Admiral (1896–1971)

Admiral Sir William Slayter KCB DSO DSC
- Born: William Rudolph Slayter; 13 February 1896; Chicago, Illinois, U.S.
- Died: 30 April 1971 (aged 75); Gosport, Hampshire, England
- Military career
- Allegiance: United Kingdom
- Branch: Royal Navy
- Service years: 1916–1954
- Rank: Admiral
- Commands: East Indies Station
- Conflicts: World War I World War II
- Awards: Knight Commander of the Order of the Bath; Distinguished Service Order; Distinguished Service Cross

Sir William Rudolph Slayter (13 February 1896 – 30 April 1971) was a British-American senior Royal Navy officer.

== Early life and education ==
Slayter was born in Chicago, Illinois, the son of American parents both born in Chicago. His father, John Howard Slayter, was a physician born to an American mother and Canadian father, and was raised in Canada. His mother, Harriet Alice Schloesser, was the daughter of German immigrants. His parents moved to Surrey, England, in the early 1900s, where his father served with the British Red Cross and was an instructor in the Royal Army Medical Corps.

He entered the Royal Naval College, Osborne as a naval cadet in 1909.

== Naval career ==
Slayter joined the Royal Navy as a sub-lieutenant on 15 March 1916 during the First World War. He saw action in the Second World War as Deputy Director of Naval Ordnance from March 1940, Director of Naval Ordnance from January 1941 and as Chief of Staff, Home Fleet from November 1943.

After the war became Captain of the Gunnery School at Portsmouth in September 1945, commander of the 2nd Cruiser Squadron in May 1949 and Admiral Commanding Reserves in October 1950, after promotion to vice-admiral on 15 August 1950. His last appointment was as Commander-in-Chief, East Indies Station in August 1952 before retiring in August 1954.

He was made Knight Commander of the KCB in the 1952 Birthday Honours.

== Personal life ==
In 1925, he married Helen Justine Hale, daughter of Major Russell Hale, in Ontario, Canada. They had one son. Lady Slayter died in 1969.

Military offices
Preceded by Sir Geoffrey Oliver	Commander-in-Chief, East Indies Station; 1952–1954	Succeeded by Sir Charles Norris
