= Henry Montagu Doughty =

Rear-Admiral Henry Montagu Doughty CB CMG
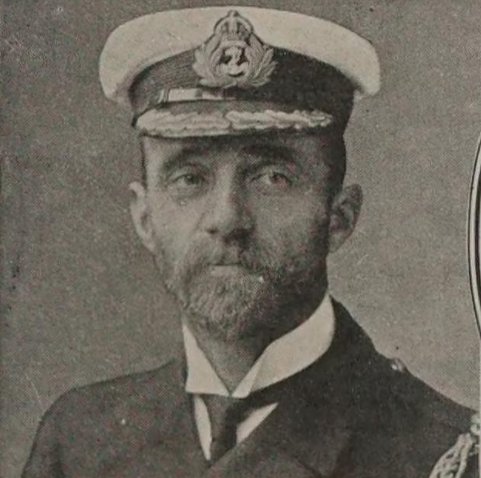
- Doughty as a captain
- Born: 4 September 1870
- Died: 1 May 1921 (aged 50)
- Military career
- Allegiance: United Kingdom
- Branch: Royal Navy
- Rank: Rear-Admiral
- Commands: HMS Abercrombie; HMS Agincourt; HMS Ramillies; HMS Royal Sovereign
- Conflicts: First World War
- Awards: Companion of the Order of the Bath; Companion of the Order of St Michael and St George

Rear-Admiral Henry Montagu Doughty, CB, CMG (4 September 1870 – 1 May 1921) was an officer of the Royal Navy during the First World War.

== Biography ==
Doughty was born in 1870, and joined the Royal Navy, where he was promoted to sub-lieutenant on 14 January 1890, and to lieutenant on 14 January 1892. He was on 22 July 1902 posted as first lieutenant and gunnery officer to the pre-dreadnought battleship HMS Jupiter, and remained in that post until 31 December 1902, when he was promoted to commander. The following month he was posted to the battleship HMS Empress of India, flagship of the home squadron in the Home Fleet.

During the First World War he was successively in command of the monitor HMS Abercrombie, and of several battleships, including HMS Agincourt, HMS Ramillies, and HMS Royal Sovereign.

He was promoted to rear-admiral on 1 November 1919. Doughty died at Haslar Naval Hospital, Hampshire, on 1 May 1921 aged 50, and was buried at the Royal Naval Cemetery, Haslar.
