= Directorate of Naval Tactical and Weapons Policy =

British Royal Navy, naval staff

- Active: (1920-1939), (1958-1968)
- Country: United Kingdom
- Allegiance: British Empire
- Branch: Royal Navy
- Type: Naval Staff Directorate
- Part of: Admiralty Naval Staff (1920—1964); Naval Staff, Ministry of Defence, (Navy Department) (1964—1968)
- Garrison/HQ: Admiralty, then MOD; Whitehall; London, Great Britain

The Directorate Naval Tactical and Weapons Policy originally called the Tactical Section was a directorate of the British Admiralty, and later of the Naval Staff, Ministry of Defence, (Navy Department). Dating from 1920 it operated until 1939 before being abolished. It was revived in 1958 and existed until 1968. The naval staff directorate was administered by the Director, Directorate Naval Tactical and Weapons Policy.

== History ==
In 1920 reorganization of the Naval Staff led to the Assistant Chief of Naval Staff becoming responsible for tactical policy and including ships and weapons development this led to the creation of a tactical section which he superintended. In December 1928 it absorbed some of the Torpedo Division and continued to function until 1939 at the beginning of World War Two when it was abolished. The division was reformed under a new name the Tactical and Weapons Policy Division in 1958. It survived the merger of the Admiralty into the Ministry of Defence in April 1964 until 1965 when its name was changed again to the Directorate Naval Tactical and Weapons Policy but now it was part of the Naval Staff, Ministry of Defence, (Navy Department). The directorate continued to operate until 1968 when it was abolished.

== Director of Tactical Division ==
Included:

1. Captain Alfred H.Taylor: February 1925-January 1927
2. Captain Bruce A. Fraser: January 1927-December 1928
3. Captain Henry G. Thursfield: December 1928-May 1930
4. Captain Charles D.Burke: May 1930-May 1932
5. Captain John G. Crace: May 1932-May 1934
6. Captain Denis W.Boyd: May 1934-January 1936
7. Captain Colin Cantlie: January 1936-January 1938
8. Captain Douglas A.Budgen: January 1938-May 1939

== Directors of Tactical and Weapon Policy ==
Included:

1. Captain Maurice J. Ross: February 1958-September 1959
2. Rear-Admiral Hugh C. Martell: September 1959 – 1962
3. Captain H. Richard B. Janvrin: March 1962-December 1963
4. Captain Terence T. Lewin: December 1963-December 1965

== Director of Naval Tactical Weapons Policy ==
1. Captain Ian Easton: December 1965 – 1968

== Sources ==
- "Tactical Section (Royal Navy)". The Dreadnought Project.
- Admiralty, Great Britain (February 1968). "Admiralty:Naval Staff Divisions". Navy List. London England: HM Stationery Office.
- Friedman, Norman (2011). British Cruisers: Two World Wars and After. Barnsley, England: Seaforth Publishing. ISBN 9781848320789.
- Heathcoate, Tony A. (2002). British admirals of the fleet 1734-1995 : a biographical dictionary. Barnsley, England: Pen and Sword. ISBN 0850528356
- Government, HM (1968). "Supplement to the London Gazette: Ministry of Defence (Navy Department)" (PDF). www.thegazette.co.uk. The London Gazette.
- Mackie, Colin (January 2018). "Royal Navy Senior Appointments" (PDF). gulabin.com. C. Mackie.
- Sainsbury, A. B. (25 February 1999). "Obituary: Vice-Admiral Sir Hugh Martell". The Independent.
