= Morgan Singer =

Royal Navy Admiral; Commander-in-Chief, America and West Indies Station (1864–1938)

Admiral Sir Morgan Singer KCB KCVO
- Born: 13 December 1864
- Died: 27 April 1938 (aged 73); Winchester, Hampshire
- Military career
- Allegiance: United Kingdom
- Branch: Royal Navy
- Rank: Admiral
- Commands: North America and West Indies Station
- Conflicts: World War I
- Awards: Knight Commander of the Order of the Bath; Knight Commander of the Royal Victorian Order

Sir Morgan Singer, KCB, KCVO (13 December 1864 – 27 April 1938) was a Royal Navy officer who served as Commander-in-Chief, America and West Indies Station.

== Naval career ==
Singer joined the Royal Navy in 1877, and was promoted to lieutenant on 13 December 1885. During 1900 he was in command of HMS Flying Fish, followed by a command of HMS Spiteful. In January 1903 he was appointed in command of the protected cruiser HMS Prometheus, serving with her in the Channel Fleet for a year. He was promoted to captain on 31 December 1903. By 1908 he was captain of the cruiser HMS Roxburgh.

He served in World War I and was appointed Director of Naval Ordnance in August 1914 taking responsibility for the Admiralty's entire supply of guns, torpedoes and mines. He continued in that post until March 1917. He was then second-in-command, North America and West Indies Station (to Vice-Admiral Sir William Lowther Grant, the Commander-in-Chief, North America and West Indies Station), and Admiral Superintendent, Bermuda, with HMS Caesar) as his flagship.

Promoted to vice-admiral in February 1919, he became Commander-in-Chief, America and West Indies Station the same month. He was appointed a Knight Commander of the Royal Victorian Order (KCVO) later that year, and went on to be Commander-in-Chief of Coastguards and Reserves in 1921. He was promoted to Knight Commander of the Order of the Bath (KCB) in the 1923 Birthday Honours. He became a full Admiral in 1924.

He died in Winchester in Hampshire in 1938.

== Family ==
In 1899 he married Emily Mary Desborough.

Military offices
Preceded by Sir William Grant	Commander-in-Chief, North America and West Indies Station; 1919	Succeeded by Sir Trevylyan Napier
