= Henry Deacon Barry =

Vice-Admiral Sir Henry Deacon Barry KCVO
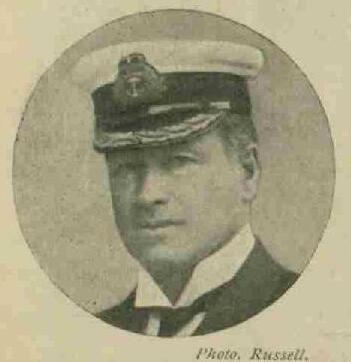
- Born: 27 November 1849
- Died: 14 November 1908 (aged 58)
- Military career
- Allegiance: United Kingdom
- Branch: Royal Navy
- Rank: Vice-Admiral
- Commands: HMS Astraea; HMS Mars; Director of Naval Ordnance; Admiral Superintendent Portsmouth (1905-06)
- Awards: Knight Commander of the Royal Victorian Order

Vice-Admiral Sir Henry Deacon Barry, KCVO (27 November 1849 – 14 November 1908) was a British Royal Navy officer who was Admiral superintendent at Portsmouth dockyard.

== Naval career ==
Barry joined the Royal Navy in the early 1870s. He was promoted to captain on 30 June 1892, and commanded the protected cruiser HMS Astraea, before he was appointed in command of the pre-dreadnought battleship HMS Mars in September 1900. During his time in command of the Mars, she suffered a serious accident in April 1902 when one of her forward 12-inch (305-mm) guns was fired before the breech was closed, killing two officers and nine enlisted men, injuring seven, and wrecking the forward main battery turret.

He was posted to the depot ship HMS Duke of Wellington at Portsmouth on 2 January 1903, and later the same month received a Good Service pension. He became Director of Naval Ordnance on 1 January 1904, but after a year was appointed Admiral-superintendent of Portsmouth dockyard in February 1905, serving as such until November the following year, when he was appointed in command of a Cruiser squadron in the Mediterranean.

Berry was appointed a Commander of the Royal Victorian Order (CVO) in 1905, and promoted to a Knight Commander (KCVO) on 10 February 1906, on the occasion of the visit of King Edward VII to Portsmouth to launch the new HMS Dreadnought.

== Family ==
Barry married, in 1881, Elizabeth Annie Maltby, daughter of Rev. H. J. Maltby.
