= Naval Ordnance Department =

Department of the Admiralty in British Royal Navy

- Ensign 1922–1958

Agency overview
- Formed: 1891
- Preceding agency: Ordnance Board
- Dissolved: 1958
- Superseding agency: Weapons Department
- Jurisdiction: Government of the United Kingdom
- Headquarters: Admiralty Building Whitehall London
- Agency executives: Director of Naval Ordnance; Assistant Director of Naval Ordnance; Deputy Director of Naval Ordnance
- Parent department: Third Sea Lord's Department of the Admiralty

The Naval Ordnance Department, also known as the Department of the Director of Naval Ordnance, was a former department of the Admiralty responsible for the procurement of naval ordnance of the Royal Navy. The department was managed by a Director, supported by various assistants and deputies; it existed from 1891 to 1958.

== Precursors ==
Before 1855 the supply of guns and ammunition to the Royal Navy was the responsibility of the Ordnance Board, which was also concerned with supplying ordnance to the Army and which tended to concentrate on the latter function, although naval officers served on the board and on the Ordnance Select Committee which succeeded it. The Ordnance Board was abolished in May 1855, its responsibilities for naval ordnance passed to the War Office, where a naval officer was appointed Naval Director-General of Artillery within the Artillery Branch. He retained that title from 1858 to 1868, when he was also Director of Stores, War Office; he was also the Vice-President of the Ordnance Select Committee.

== History ==
A Director-General, subsequently Director of Naval Ordnance, in the Controller's Department of the Admiralty was first appointed in 1866, but he did not take over procurement of naval ordnance from the War Office until 1888 or custody and supply until 1891, when a Naval Ordnance Department was finally established at the Admiralty.

By stages from 1908 the Admiralty also took over responsibility from the War Office for inspecting naval ordnance when a Chief Inspector of Naval Ordnance was appointed. The Royal Ordnance Factories, under the control of the War Office, continued, however, to manufacture naval ordnance though a large proportion, including most of the heaviest guns, was let to private contract.

From 1917 until the department was responsible for mines and torpedoes. Between 1918 and 1923 and again from 1939 there was a separate Armament Supply Department.The Naval Ordnance Inspection Department was set up in 1922 to control quality in the manufacture and testing of weapons and ammunition for the fleet. Chemical and metallurgical analysis was carried out at its laboratories at Sheffield (the Bragg laboratory) and Caerwent.

During the First World War the directorate was divided, and a separate Department of the Director of Torpedoes and Mining was created. After the Second World War in 1946 this became the Underwater Weapons Department. The Bragg laboratory, so-called from 1938, continued unchanged until 1968, when its chemical analysis work became part of the Army Department's Directorate of Chemical Inspection at Woolwich. From 1941 to 1945 there was a Department of Miscellaneous Weapons Development.

In 1958 the two were re-united as divisions of the Weapons Department, under the Director General of Weapons (Director General, Weapons from 1960 to 1964). Bragg continued as the Naval Ordnance Inspection (later Service) and Metallurgical Unit (NOIMU, later NOSMU) until 1984 when it was closed and its work transferred to Woolwich. Caerwent laboratory continued investigating propellants until 1971.

== Directors ==
Included:

=== Directors of Naval Ordnance ===
- Rear-Admiral Astley Cooper Key, September 1866-July 1869
- Captain Arthur W. A. Hood, July 1869-May 1874
- Rear-Admiral Henry Boys, May 1874-May 1878
- Rear-Admiral Richard Vesey Hamilton, June 1878-March 1880
- Rear-Admiral Frederick A. Herbert, April 1880-April 1883
- Rear-Admiral John Ommanney Hopkins, April 1883-November 1886

=== Directors of Naval Ordnance and Torpedoes ===
Included:

- Rear-Admiral John A. Fisher, November 1886-May 1891
- Rear-Admiral Compton E. Domvile, May 1891-March 1894
- Captain Henry Coey Kane, March 1894-August 1897
- Rear-Admiral Edmund Jeffreys, August 1897-January 1901
- Captain William H. May, January–April 1901
- Rear-Admiral Angus MacLeod, April 1901-January 1904
- Rear-Admiral Henry Deacon Barry, January 1904-February 1905
- Rear-Admiral John R. Jellicoe. February 1905-August 1907
- Captain Reginald H.S. Bacon, August 1907-December 1909
- Captain Archibald G.H.W. Moore, December 1909-June 1912
- Captain Frederick C.T.Tudor, June 1912-August 1914
- Captain Morgan Singer, August 1914-March 1917

=== Directors of Naval Ordnance ===
Included:

- Captain Frederic Charles Dreyer, March 1917-June 1918
- Captain Henry R. Crooke, June 1918-September 1920
- Captain Roger R.C.Backhouse, September 1920-December 1922
- Captain Joseph C.W.Henley, December 1922-May 1925,
- Captain Charles M. Forbes, July 1925-July 1928
- Captain Julian F.C.Patterson, July 1928-April 1931,
- Captain F. Thomas B. Tower, April 1931-July 1933
- Captain Bruce A. Fraser, July 1933-March 1936
- Captain Charles E. B. Simeon, March 1936-May 1939,
- Captain John C. Leach, May 1939-January 1941
- Captain William R. Slayter, January–August 1941
- Captain Oliver Bevir, August 1941-March 1944
- Captain Charles H. L. Woodhouse, March 1944-February 1945
- Rear-Admiral Charles H. L. Woodhouse, March 1945-February 1946
- Captain Dennis M. Lees, February 1946-December 1948
- Captain Henry A. King, December 1948-June 1951
- Captain William J. Yendell, June 1951-March 1954
- Captain John Graham Hamilton, March 1954-March 1956
- Captain Richard E. Washbourn, March 1956-May 1958
- Rear-Admiral Gilbert C. de Jersey, May–July 1958

== Assistant Directors ==
Included:

=== Assistant Directors of Torpedoes ===
- Captain Arthur K. Wilson, 1887–1888
- Captain Edmund F. Jeffreys, 1889–1893
- Captain William H. 1893–1895
- Captain The Hon. Maurice A. Bourke, 1895-1896
- Captain Sir Baldwin W. Walker, 1895-1897
- Captain Ernest A. Simons, 1898
- Captain George Le C. Egerton, 1898– 1899
- Captain Alexander W. Chisholm-Batten, 1899–1901
- Captain George Le C. Egerton, 1901–1902
- Captain Henry B. Jackson, 1902–1903
- Captain The Hon. Alexander E. Bethell, 1903–1906
- Captain Bernard Currey, 21 December 1906 – 1908
- Captain Stuart Nicholson, 21 December 1908 – 1911
- Captain Edward F. B. Charlton, 1911–1914
- Captain Philip Dumas, 15 August 1914 – 1917
- Captain Algernon H. C. Candy, 8 February 1917 – 1919
- Captain Brien M. Money, 1919–1921
- Captain Arthur T. Walker, 1921–1922

=== Assistant Directors of Naval Ordnance ===
- Captain Frederick C. T. Tudor, 1906–1909
- Captain Arthur W. Craig, 1909–1911
- Captain James C. Ley, 1911–1912
- Captain James D. Dick, 1912–1914
- Commander Basil E. Reinold, 1914-1915
- Captain Herbert R. Norbury, 1915-1916
- Captain Joseph C. W. Henley, 1917–1919

== Deputy Directors ==
Included:

=== Deputy Directors of Naval Ordnance ===
- Captain Cecil V. Usborne, January 1919-May 1921
- Captain Roger R.C. Backhouse, August–September 1920
- Captain G.T. Carlisle P. Swabey, May 1921-October 1923
- Captain George R.B. Blount, October 1923-August 1925
- Captain Charles A. Scott, August 1925-April 1928
- Captain A. Ramsay Dewar, April 1928-September 1929
- Captain Frank Elliott, September 1929-March 1932
- Captain A. Francis Pridham, March 1932-April 1933
- Captain Eric R. Bent, April 1933-October 1934
- Captain Gerard W.T. Robertson, October 1934-March 1936
- Captain Harold R.G. Kinahan, March 1936-June 1937
- Captain Francis W.H. Jeans, June 1937-July 1938
- Captain Michael M. Denny, July 1938-March 1940
- Captain William R. Slayter, March 1940-January 1941
- Captain Frederick R. Parham, January 1941-August 1942
- Captain Patrick V. McLaughlin, August 1942-March 1943
- Captain Robert F. Elkins, March 1943-November 1944
- Captain Kenneth L. Harkness, April 1943-February 1945
- Captain Henry N.S. Brown, February 1945-October 1947
- Captain Alan F. Campbell, September 1946-September 1948
- Captain Thomas V. Briggs, October 1947 – 1949
- Captain William J. Lamb, September 1948 – 1950
- Captain Desmond P. Dreyer, July 1949-September 1952
- Captain Richard E. Washbourn, September 1950 – 1953
- Captain Francis W.R. Larken, September 1952-November 1955
- Captain Thomas W. Best, November 1955 – 1958

== Subsidiary departments ==
Note: At various times were under the control of the Director of Naval Ordnance.

- Naval Ordnance Stores Department, (1891-1918)
- Armament Supply Department, (1918-1964)
  - Royal Naval Armaments Depot
- Department of the Chief Inspector of Naval Ordnance, (1908-1922)
- Naval Ordnance Inspection Department, (1922-1964)

== See also ==
- Board of Ordnance
