= Studholme Brownrigg =

Royal Navy Admiral; Commander-in-Chief, The Nore (1882–1943)

Admiral Sir Studholme Brownrigg KBE CB DSO
- Born: 3 September 1882; Paddington, London
- Died: 24 January 1943 (aged 60); 500 miles (805 km) off Cape Race, Newfoundland
- Military career
- Allegiance: United Kingdom
- Branch: Royal Navy
- Service years: 1902–1943
- Rank: Admiral
- Commands: HMS Courageous; Nore Command
- Conflicts: World War I World War II
- Awards: Knight Commander of the Order of the British Empire; Companion of the Order of the Bath; Distinguished Service Order

Admiral Sir Henry John Studholme Brownrigg, KBE, CB, DSO (3 September 1882 – 24 January 1943) was a Royal Navy officer who was Commander-in-Chief, The Nore.

== Naval career ==
Brownrigg joined the Royal Navy, was promoted to acting sub-lieutenant on 3 September 1901 and subsequently confirmed in that rank from the same date. In November 1902 he was posted to the pre-dreadnought battleship HMS Ramillies, serving in the Mediterranean Fleet.

He served in World War I and took part in the Battle of Jutland in 1916, as executive officer of HMS Barham (with rank of Commander). He went on to be Chief of Staff at the Africa Station and, from 1925, deputy director of the Gunnery Division. He became Director of the Gunnery Division in 1926 and Chief of Staff at Plymouth in 1927. He was made Captain of HMS Courageous in 1929 and then joined the staff of the Director of Naval Ordnance in 1931.

He became Rear Admiral commanding 3rd Cruiser Squadron in 1933 and Vice-Admiral Mediterranean Fleet in 1935. He was Admiral commanding the Reserves from 1936 and Commander-in-Chief, The Nore from January to December 1939. He served in World War II as officer commanding the Home Guard at Chatham from 1940 to 1941. He came out of retirement to take charge of convoys. He sailed as Commodore of Convoy ON 16 in SS Ville de Tamatave (a ship captured from the Vichy French in 1941), departing Liverpool on 12 January 1943 en route for New York. The convoy ran into a violent storm in the North Atlantic towards the evening of 23 January. Messages were received from the Ville de Tamatave indicating that she had lost her rudder and, an hour later, that she was sinking. The other ships were not able to render assistance, and Ville de Tamatave was lost with all hands, including Brownrigg, on 24 January 1943.

Military offices
Preceded by Sir Edward Evans	Commander-in-Chief, The Nore; January 1939 – December 1939	Succeeded by Sir Reginald Plunkett
