= Henry Oliver =

Royal Navy Admiral of the Fleet (1865–1965)

Admiral of the Fleet Sir Henry Oliver GCB KCMG MVO
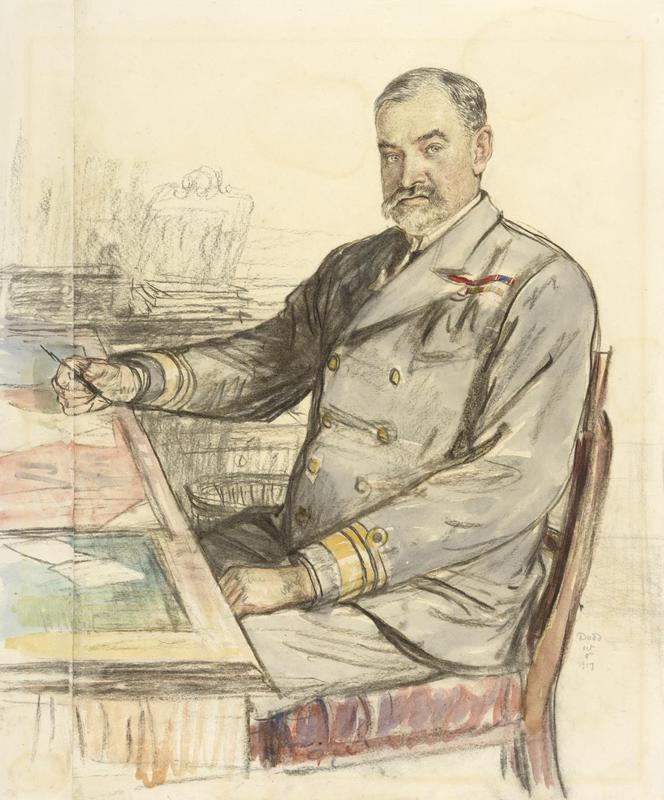
- 1917 portrait by Francis Dodd
- Born: 22 January 1865; Kelso, Scotland
- Died: 15 October 1965 (aged 100); London, England
- Military career
- Allegiance: United Kingdom
- Branch: Royal Navy
- Service years: 1878–1933
- Rank: Admiral of the Fleet
- Commands: Atlantic Fleet; Reserve Fleet; Home Fleet; 2nd Battle Squadron; Battle Cruiser Force; 1st Battlecruiser Squadron; HMS Thunderer; HMS Achilles; HMS Mercury
- Conflicts: Second Boer War; First World War
- Awards: Knight Grand Cross of the Order of the Bath; Knight Commander of the Order of St Michael and St George; Member of the Royal Victorian Order

Admiral of the Fleet Sir Henry Francis Oliver, GCB, KCMG, MVO (22 January 1865 – 15 October 1965) was a Royal Navy officer. After serving in the Second Boer War as a navigating officer in a cruiser on the Cape of Good Hope and West Coast of Africa Station, he became the first commanding officer of the new navigation school HMS Mercury in the early years of the 20th century. He went to be commanding officer first of the armoured cruiser HMS Achilles and then of the new battleship HMS Thunderer before becoming Director of the Intelligence Division at the Admiralty.

During the First World War, Oliver was sent to Antwerp where, with Belgian support, he blew up the engine rooms of 38 stranded German merchant vessels. He became Naval Secretary to Winston Churchill, First Lord of the Admiralty, and then chief of the Admiralty War Staff before serving as Deputy Chief of the Naval Staff. In that capacity, he was closely involved in directing the Allied forces at the Battle of Jutland. He served as commander of the 1st Battlecruiser Squadron in the Grand Fleet in the last year of the war.

After the war, Oliver commanded, in rapid succession, the 2nd Battle Squadron, the Home Fleet and the Reserve Fleet. After that he became Second Sea Lord and Chief of Naval Personnel and implemented the extensive expenditure cuts recommended by the Committee on National Expenditure chaired by Sir Eric Geddes and the large reductions in numbers of ships agreed under the terms of the Washington Naval Treaty. His last appointment was as commander-in-chief of the Atlantic Fleet.

== Naval career ==
=== Early career ===
Born the fifth son of Robert Oliver and Margaret Oliver (née Strickland) at Lochside near Kelso, Oliver joined the Royal Navy as a cadet in the training ship Britannia on 15 July 1878. He joined the armoured frigate Agincourt, flagship of the Second-in-Command of the Channel Squadron, in September 1880 and, having been promoted to midshipman on 21 January 1881, he transferred to the corvette Amethyst on the South America Station in March 1882. Promoted to sub-lieutenant on 21 January 1885, he joined the battleship Triumph, flagship of the Pacific Station, in October 1886. Promoted to lieutenant on 30 June 1888, he joined the survey ship Stork and then qualified as a navigator. He then became navigating officer in the cruiser Wallaroo on the Australia Station in February 1894, navigating officer in the cruiser Blake in the Channel Squadron in January 1898 and navigating officer in the cruiser Niobe on the Cape of Good Hope and West Coast of Africa Station in December 1898 in which he served during the Second Boer War. Promoted to commander on 31 December 1899, he became navigating officer on the battleship Majestic, flagship of the Vice-Admiral Commanding the Channel Squadron, in September 1900. He was appointed fleet navigator, demonstrating his skills on one occasion by leading the entire Channel Fleet into a southern Irish anchorage in thick fog with the ships anchoring by signal. They were revealed to be perfectly positioned when the fog lifted. He proposed a number of ideas for improving the organisation and training of the Navy's navigation branch, and was directed by Admiral Jacky Fisher, then the Second Sea Lord, to put them into effect.

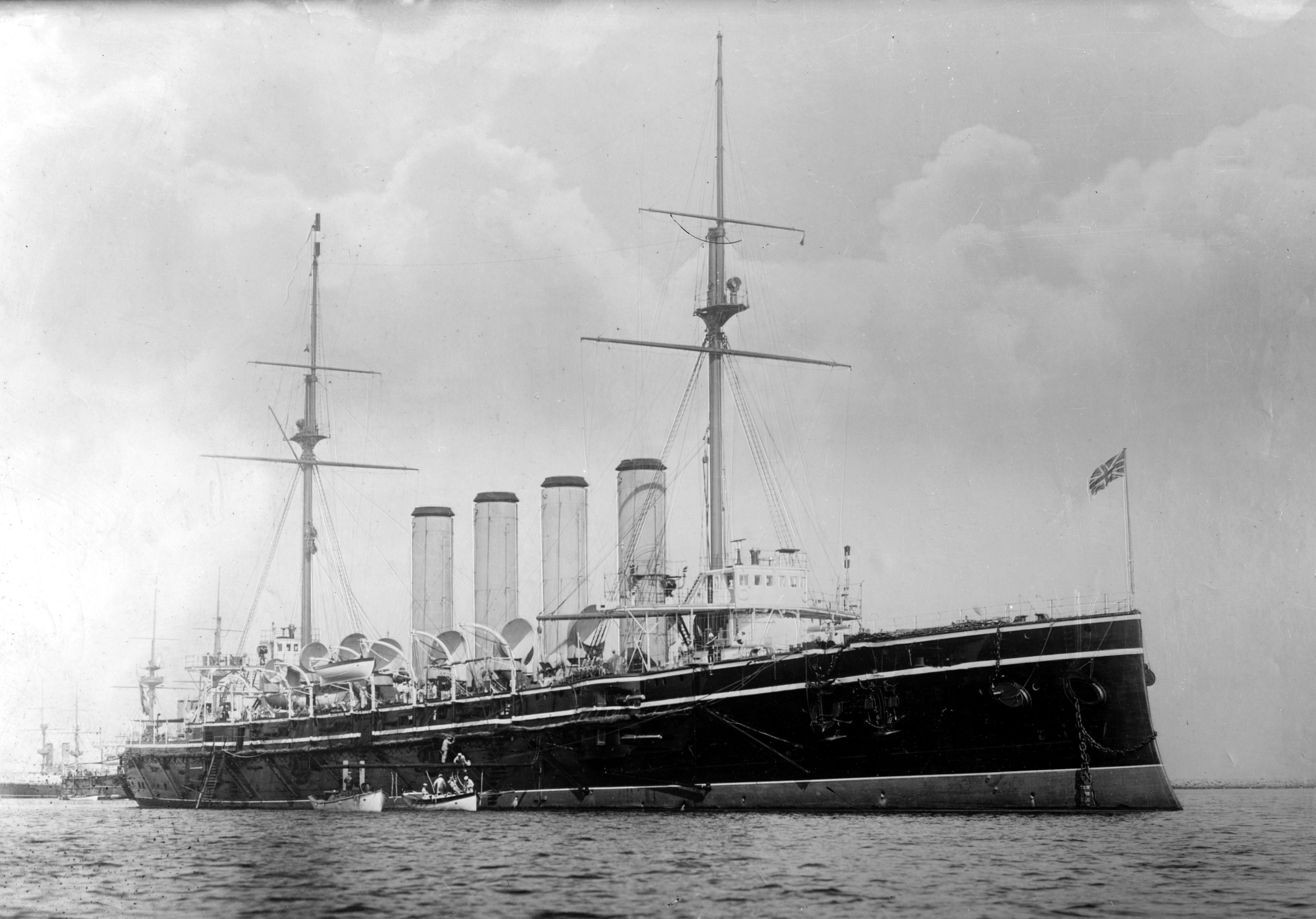
The cruiser HMS Niobe in which Oliver served during the Second Boer War

Promoted to captain on 30 June 1903, Oliver became the first commanding officer of his proposed new navigation school Mercury that year.

Appointed a Member of the Royal Victorian Order on 11 August 1905, he went on to be commanding officer of the armoured cruiser Achilles in the Home Fleet in February 1907 and then became Naval Assistant to Admiral Fisher, now the First Sea Lord, in November 1908. After that he became commanding officer of the new battleship Thunderer in 1912 and was appointed a naval aide-de-camp to the King on 2 March 1913. Appointed a Companion of the Order of the Bath on 3 June 1913, he was promoted to rear-admiral on 7 December 1913 and became Director of the Intelligence Division at the Admiralty later that month. He gained the somewhat unflattering nickname of 'Dummy' from his unsmiling countenance and reluctance to speak unless he had to.

=== First World War ===
In August 1914, just after the outbreak of the First World War, Oliver was sent to Antwerp, where, with Belgian support, he blew up the engine rooms of 38 stranded German merchant vessels. He became Naval Secretary to Winston Churchill, First Lord of the Admiralty, in October 1914 and chief of the Admiralty War Staff in November 1914. He was advanced to Knight Commander of the Order of the Bath on 1 January 1916. When Admiral Sir John Jellicoe was appointed First Sea Lord in December 1916, Oliver became Deputy Chief of the Naval Staff and a Lord Commissioner of the Admiralty and in that capacity was closely involved in directing the allied forces at the Battle of Jutland in May 1916. Appointed a Knight Commander of the Order of St Michael and St George on 12 January 1918, he became commander of the 1st Battlecruiser Squadron in the Grand Fleet with his flag in the battlecruiser Repulse in March 1918.

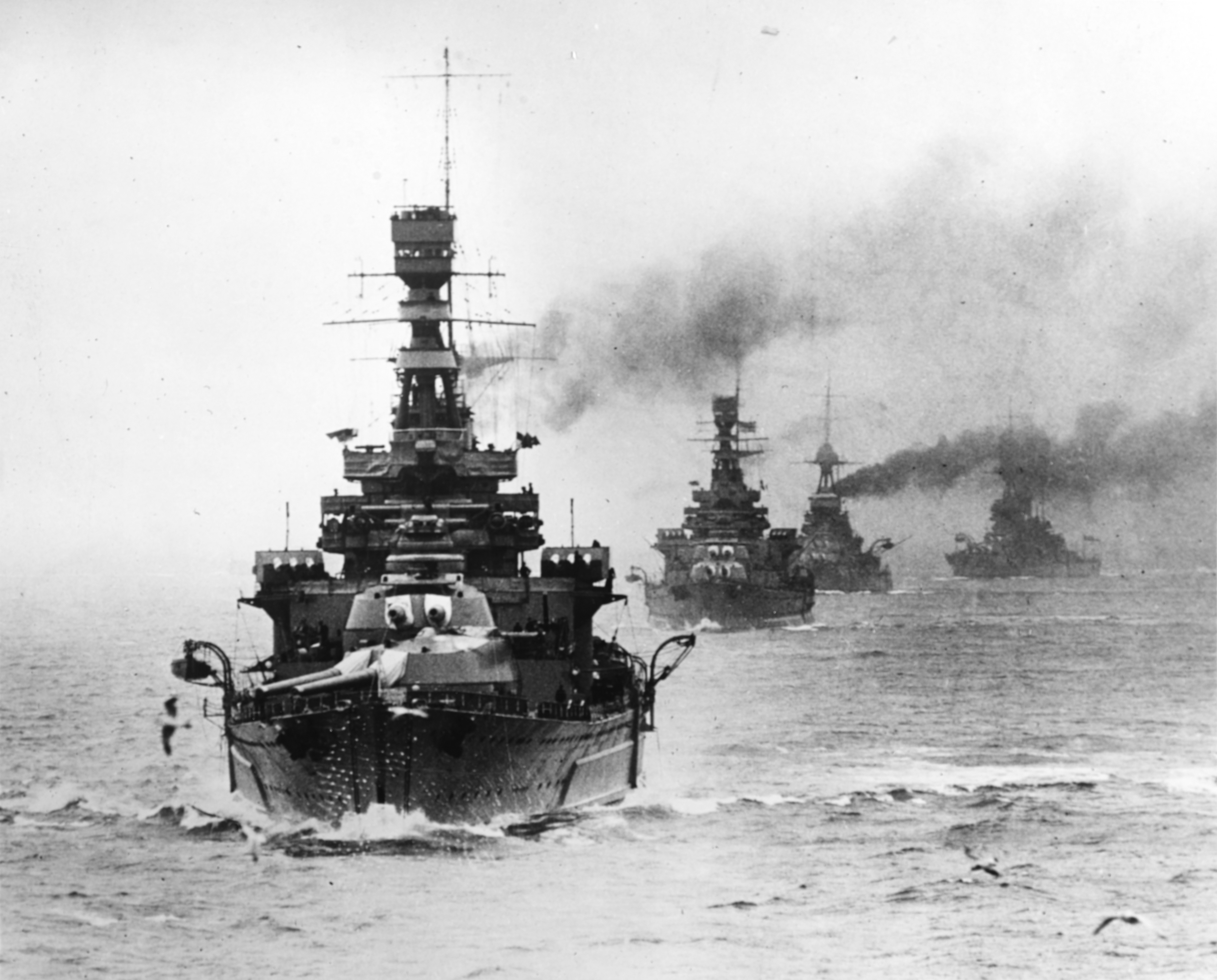
The battlecruiser Repulse, Oliver's flagship as commander of the 1st Battlecruiser Squadron in the last year of the First World War

=== After the war ===
Oliver was promoted to the rank of vice-admiral on 1 January 1919, and in February 1919 he was given temporary command of the Battle Cruiser Force. He became commander of the 2nd Battle Squadron in March 1919. When the Grand Fleet was disbanded in April 1919, the older ships were reformed as the Home Fleet and placed under Oliver's command with his flag in the battleship King George V. Then in Autumn 1919 the Home Fleet was re-designated the Reserve Fleet and remained under Oliver's command. He became Second Sea Lord and Chief of Naval Personnel in September 1920 and in that capacity implemented the extensive expenditure cuts recommended by the Committee on National Expenditure chaired by Sir Eric Geddes in January 1922 and the large reductions in numbers of ships which were agreed under the terms of the Washington Naval Treaty in February 1922. Promoted to full admiral on 1 November 1923, he became commander-in-chief of the Atlantic Fleet in August 1924. He was promoted to Admiral of the Fleet on 21 January 1928 and advanced to Knight Grand Cross of the Order of the Bath on 4 June 1928 before retiring in January 1933. He attended the funeral of King George V in January 1936.

In retirement Oliver became deputy chairman of the Royal National Lifeboat Institution. When he reached the age of 100 in January 1965, it was estimated that during his thirty-year period of retirement he had received £76,000 in retired pay. He died at his home in London on 15 October 1965. He was reputed, throughout his naval service, to be the worst-dressed officer in the Navy but was also renowned for his work ethic; he rarely took any leave and often worked fourteen hours a day, including at weekends. It has been claimed he was not highly regarded as an inspiring leader of those who served under him.

== Family ==
In June 1914 Oliver married Beryl Carnegy White (later Dame Beryl Oliver); they had no children.

== Honours and awards ==
- Knight Grand Cross of the Order of the Bath – 1928 Birthday Honours (KCB – 1 January 1916; CB – 3 June 1913)
- Knight Commander of the Order of St Michael and St George – 12 January 1918
- Member of the Royal Victorian Order – 11 August 1905
- Commander of the Legion of Honour (France) – 25 January 1918
- Order of the Sacred Treasure, 1st class (Japan) – 2 November 1917

== Sources ==
- Heathcote, Tony (2002). The British Admirals of the Fleet 1734 – 1995. Pen & Sword Ltd. ISBN 0-85052-835-6.

Military offices
Preceded by Thomas Jackson	Director of Naval Intelligence; 1913–1914	Succeeded by William Hall
Preceded by Horace Hood	Naval Secretary; October 1914 – November 1914	Succeeded by Charles de Bartolomé
Preceded by New Post	Deputy Chief of the Naval Staff; 1917–1918	Succeeded by Sir Sydney Fremantle
Preceded by New Post	Vice-Admiral, Reserve Fleet; 1919–1920	Succeeded by Sir Richard Phillimore
Preceded by Sir Montague Browning	Second Sea Lord; 1920–1924	Succeeded by Sir Michael Culme-Seymour, Bt
Preceded by Sir John de Robeck	Commander-in-Chief, Atlantic Fleet; 1924–1927	Succeeded by Sir Hubert Brand
