= DCNS =

DCNS may refer to:

- Deputy Chief of Naval Staff (Australia)
- Deputy Chief of the Naval Staff (India)
- Deputy Chief of the Naval Staff (Pakistan)
- Deputy Chief of the Naval Staff (United Kingdom), Royal Navy
- Naval Group, formerly known as DCNS, French industrial group specialising in naval defence and energy
