= Beryl Oliver =

British charity administrator

Dame Beryl Oliver GBE RRC
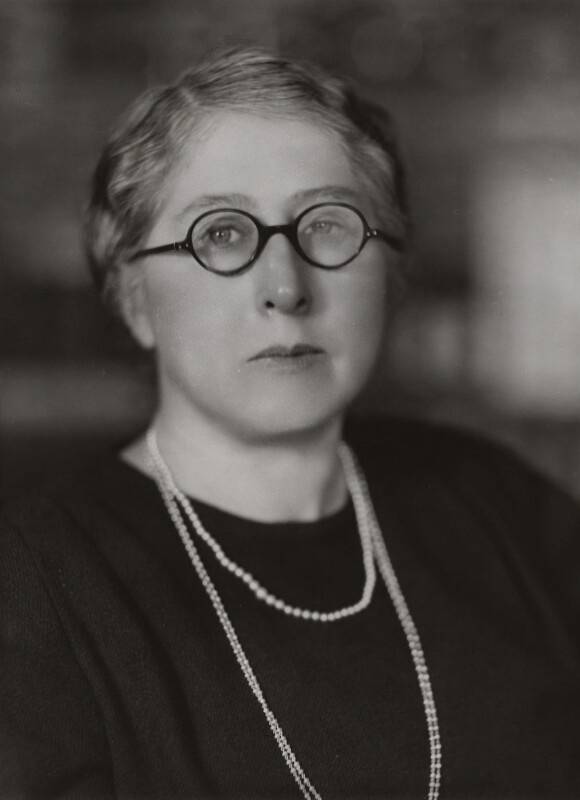
- Oliver in 1938

Director of Education, British Red Cross Society
- In office 1945–1956

Head of the Naval and Military Voluntary Aid Detachment (VAD) Department
- In office 1914–1922

Personal details
- Born: Beryl Carnegy Joseph; 20 August 1882 Australia
- Died: 13 July 1972 (aged 89) London, England

Dame Beryl Carnegy Oliver, Lady Oliver, GBE, RRC (née Joseph; 20 August 1882 – 13 July 1972) was a British charity administrator as well as the British Red Cross Society's Director of Education.

== Early life ==
Oliver was born in Australia to British parents, Francis Edward Joseph and Isabella Eliza Butter (née Carnegy) Joseph. She had a younger brother, Ughtred Elliot Joseph (later Ughtred Elliot Carnegy, of Lour).

Isabella came from a titled Scottish family; her father, Patrick Carnegy of Lour, was a descendant of David Carnegie, 2nd Earl of Northesk. The family later adopted the Carnegy surname after Isabella succeeded to her father's estates in 1915. Oliver was educated privately in England and France. On 10 June 1914, she married Rear-Admiral (later Admiral of the Fleet) Sir Henry Oliver of the Royal Navy.

== Career ==
In 1910, she joined the St John Ambulance Brigade and rapidly rose through the ranks. On the outbreak of the First World War she was put in charge of the Naval and Military Volunteer Aid Detachment (VAD) Department, which administered the combined nursing staff of St John Ambulance and the British Red Cross Society. She held the post throughout the war, but resigned in 1922 in opposition to plans to disband the VADs. She later joined the British Red Cross Society as head of its VAD department.

She was credited with keeping the British Red Cross alive after the First World War, as she was later eulogised by a friend in The Times.

Between the two world wars it was largely Lady Oliver's enthusiasm and untiring work which kept the British Red Cross active. It was thanks to her insistence on the importance of recruiting and maintaining the training of members of voluntary Aid Detachments at a high pitch after the 1914-18 War – despite its being considered the War to End Wars – that these members were in a position to answer the innumerable calls which came at a time when their services were so urgently needed in Hospitals and First Aid Posts at the outbreak of the Second World War.

— A.L., letter to The Times, 19 July 1972

During the Second World War she was a member of the Society's War Organisation Executive Committee and several other committees. After the war she became the Society's Director of Education, retiring in 1956. She then became the BRCS's archivist and published its definitive history, The British Red Cross in Action, in 1966. She published a second book, The Church of Saint Mary the Virgin, Aldermanbury, in 1969.

== Honours ==
In recognition of her work in the First World War, Oliver was awarded the Royal Red Cross (RRC) in 1916, and appointed Commander of the Order of the British Empire (CBE) in the 1919 New Year Honours and Dame Commander of the Order of the British Empire (DBE) in the 1920 civilian war honours.

In recognition of her work in the Second World War, she was appointed Dame Grand Cross of the Order of the British Empire (GBE) in the 1948 New Year Honours. After the King invested her as a Dame Grand Cross, the Queen, as President of the British Red Cross Society, presented her with a diamond brooch at a party at Buckingham Palace.

== Death ==
Her husband died in 1965, aged 100. She died in London in 1972, aged 89. Per her wishes, her ashes were interred on the Hill of Lour, Angus.
