= Geoffrey Barnard =

Royal Navy Vice-Admiral (1902–1974)

Vice-Admiral Sir Geoffrey Barnard KCB CBE DSO*
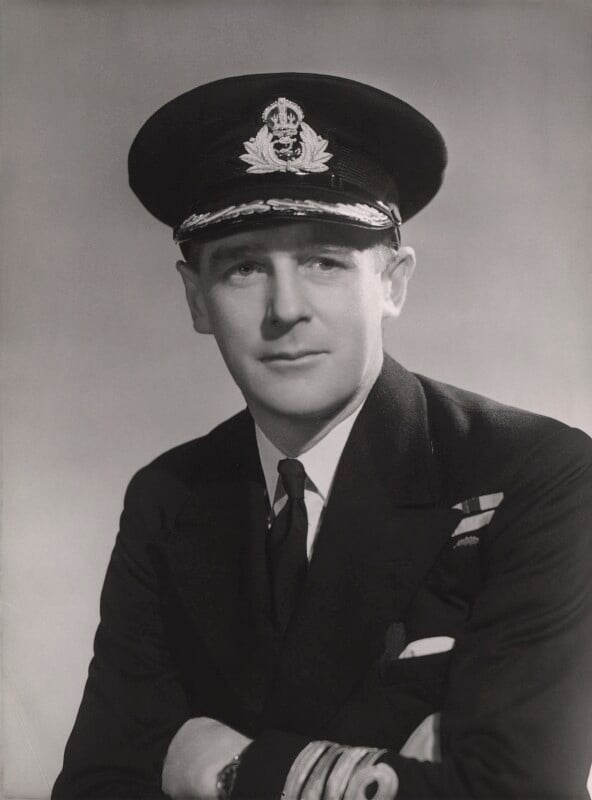
- Barnard in 1944
- Born: 12 November 1902; St George Hanover Square, London
- Died: 19 December 1974 (aged 72); Petersfield, Hampshire
- Military career
- Allegiance: United Kingdom
- Branch: Royal Navy
- Service years: 1916–1959
- Rank: Vice-Admiral
- Commands: President, Royal Naval College, Greenwich (1956–58); Deputy Chief of the Naval Staff (1953–54); HMIS Delhi (1950–51); HMS Aurora (1943–45); HMS Daring (1935–37)
- Conflicts: First World War; Second World War: Battle of Cape Matapan; Operation Torch; Operation Dragoon
- Awards: Knight Commander of the Order of the Bath; Commander of the Order of the British Empire; Distinguished Service Order & Bar; Mentioned in Dispatches; Legion of Honour (France); Croix de guerre (France)

Vice-Admiral Sir Geoffrey Barnard, KCB, CBE, DSO & Bar (12 November 1902 – 19 December 1974) was a Royal Navy officer who became Deputy Chief of the Naval Staff.

== Naval career ==
Barnard joined the Royal Navy in 1916 during the First World War. He attended the Royal Naval College, Dartmouth in 1918, and subsequently specialised in Gunnery. He was given command of the destroyer HMS Daring in 1935.

He served in the Second World War as Fleet Gunnery Officer and Deputy Chief of Staff to the Commander-in-Chief, Mediterranean Fleet, earning the Distinguished Service Order (DSO) at the Battle of Cape Matapan in March 1941, and seeing action at the landings in North Africa in 1942. He was mentioned in dispatches in connection with the landings in North Africa in April 1943, and was appointed a Commander of the Order of the British Empire in September 1943.

He took command of the cruiser HMS Aurora in 1944, and was awarded a Bar to his DSO during Operation Dragoon in 1945.

After the War he became Chief Staff Officer to the Flag Officer (Air) in 1946 and Director of the Royal Navy Tactical School in 1948. He was attached to the Indian Navy and commanded the Indian Navy Squadron from 1950 before being appointed Assistant Chief of the Naval Staff (Warfare) in 1952. He became Deputy Chief of the Naval Staff and a Lord Commissioner of the Admiralty in 1953 and a Companion of the Order of the Bath in June 1953.

He became Naval Attaché at the Joint Services Mission in Washington, D.C. in 1954. His last role was as President of the Royal Naval College, Greenwich, in 1956. He was advanced to Knight Commander of the Order of the Bath in June 1957, before retiring in 1959.

== Family ==
In 1926 he married Julyan Frances Crawley; they had one son and two daughters.

Military offices
| Preceded by H.N.S. Brown | Commodore Commanding Indian Naval Squadron; 1950–1951 | Appointment upgraded |
| New title Appointment upgraded | Rear Admiral Commanding Indian Naval Squadron; 1951–1951 | Succeeded by N. V. Dickinson |
| Preceded by Sir Edward Evans-Lombe | Deputy Chief of the Naval Staff; 1953–1954 | Succeeded by Sir Eric Clifford |
| Preceded by Sir William Andrewes | President, Royal Naval College, Greenwich; 1956–1958 | Succeeded by Earl Cairns |
