= Eric Clifford =

Royal Navy Vice Admiral (1900–1964)

Vice-Admiral Sir Eric Clifford KCB CBE
- Born: 3 September 1900; Hove, Sussex, England
- Died: 7 September 1964 (aged 64); Hailsham, Sussex, England
- Military career
- Allegiance: United Kingdom
- Branch: Royal Navy
- Rank: Vice-Admiral
- Commands: Deputy Chief of the Naval Staff; Flag Officer Second in Command Far East Fleet; 5th Cruiser Squadron; HMS Illustrious; HMS Diadem; HMS Salisbury; HMS Mackay
- Conflicts: World War I World War II; Korean War
- Awards: Knight Commander of the Order of the Bath; Commander of the Order of the British Empire; Mentioned in dispatches

Vice-Admiral Sir Eric George Anderson Clifford, KCB, CBE (3 September 1900 – 7 September 1964) was a Royal Navy officer who served as Deputy Chief of the Naval Staff from 1954 to 1957.

== Early life and education ==
Clifford was born in Hove, Sussex, the son of Captain William Trannock Clifford RNR of Poplar and his wife, Clara Strutt, born in Cape Colony. Like his father, Clifford was educated at the Thames Nautical Training College and aboard HMS Worcester. In January 1917, he joined the Royal Naval Reserve as a midshipman, and then entered the Royal Navy.

== Naval career ==
Clifford served in the First World War in the battleships HMS Iron Duke and HMS Colossus and then specialised in navigation. He was appointed Fleet Navigating Officer, for the China Station in 1938. He served in the Second World War as Commanding Officer of the destroyers HMS Mackay and HMS Salisbury and then as Naval Assistant Secretary to the War Cabinet from 1941 to 1943. In the closing stages of the war he commanded the cruiser HMS Diadem.

After the war Clifford became Chief of Staff in Hong Kong and then was given command of the Navigation School in 1947. He went on to command the aircraft carrier HMS Illustrious in 1949 before becoming Assistant Chief of the Naval Staff in 1951 and Flag Officer commanding the 5th Cruiser Squadron and Flag Officer Second in Command Far East Fleet in 1952. In the latter role he saw action during the Korean War. He was made Deputy Chief of the Naval Staff and a Lord Commissioner of the Admiralty in 1954; he retired in 1957.

Military offices
| Preceded by Sir Geoffrey Barnard | Deputy Chief of the Naval Staff; 1954–1957 | Succeeded by Sir Manley Power (Post merged with that of Fifth Sea Lord) |
