= Edward Evans-Lombe =

Vice-Admiral Sir Edward Evans-Lombe KCB
- Born: Edward Malcolm Evans-Lombe; 15 October 1901; Chester, Cheshire, England
- Died: 14 May 1974 (aged 72)
- Relatives: Diana, Lady Evans-Lombe (wife); Edward Evans-Lombe (son)
- Military career
- Allegiance: United Kingdom
- Branch: Royal Navy
- Rank: Vice-Admiral
- Commands: HMS Glasgow
- Conflicts: World War II
- Awards: Knight Commander of the Order of the Bath

Vice-Admiral Sir Edward Malcolm Evans-Lombe KCB (15 October 1901 – 14 May 1974) was a Royal Navy officer who became Deputy Chief of the Naval Staff.

== Naval career ==
Educated at West Downs School and in the Royal Navy, Evans-Lombe served in the Second World War initially as Naval Assistant to the Third Sea Lord and then, from 1942, as Captain of the cruiser HMS Glasgow. He was appointed Director of the Gunnery and Anti-Aircraft Warfare Division at the Admiralty in December 1943, Chief of Staff for the Eastern Fleet in June 1944 and Chief of Staff for the British Pacific Fleet in December 1944.

He became Deputy Chief of the Naval Staff in 1950 and retired in 1955.

== Personal life ==
Evans-Lombe was appointed High Sheriff of Norfolk for 1962 and lived in retirement at Marlingford Hall. He died on 14 May 1974.

His son, Sir Edward Evans-Lombe, was a High Court judge and inherited the family country estate.

Military offices
| Vacant Title last held by Robert Oliver | Deputy Chief of the Naval Staff; 1950–1953 | Succeeded by Sir Geoffrey Barnard |
