= Edward Evans-Lombe (judge) =

British judge (1937–2022)

Sir Edward Evans-Lombe
- Royal coat of arms of the United Kingdom

Justice of the High Court
- In office 1993–2008

Personal details
- Born: Edward Christopher Evans-Lombe; 10 April 1937 United Kingdom
- Died: 20 May 2022 (aged 85) United Kingdom
- Education: Trinity College, Cambridge

Sir Edward Christopher Evans-Lombe (10 April 1937 – 20 May 2022) was a British High Court judge and landowner.

== Early life and education ==
Evans-Lombe was the son of Sir Edward Evans-Lombe and his wife Diana. He was educated at Eton and studied at Trinity College, Cambridge, receiving a Master of Arts degree.

== Career ==
He was called to the bar at the Inner Temple in 1963 and practised bankruptcy law. In 1978, he took silk and served as a recorder from 1982 until 1993.

=== High Court appointment ===
In 1993, he was appointed a judge of the High Court, receiving the customary knighthood in the same year, and was assigned to the Chancery Division. He served in the Competition Appeal Tribunal from 2004. He retired from the High Court and the Tribunal in 2008. At the High Court, he settled the dispute over Mark Birley's £104 million estate and a £54 million dispute over the family distribution of shares in Pataks.

== Personal life ==
In 1964, he married Frances MacKenzie. They had a son and a daughter. In addition to practice, he ran the Norfolk estate that had been in his family for several generations. On 20 May 2022, he died of heart disease, aged 85.
