= Tom Phillips (Royal Navy officer) =

Royal Navy Admiral (1888–1941)

Admiral Sir Tom Phillips KCB
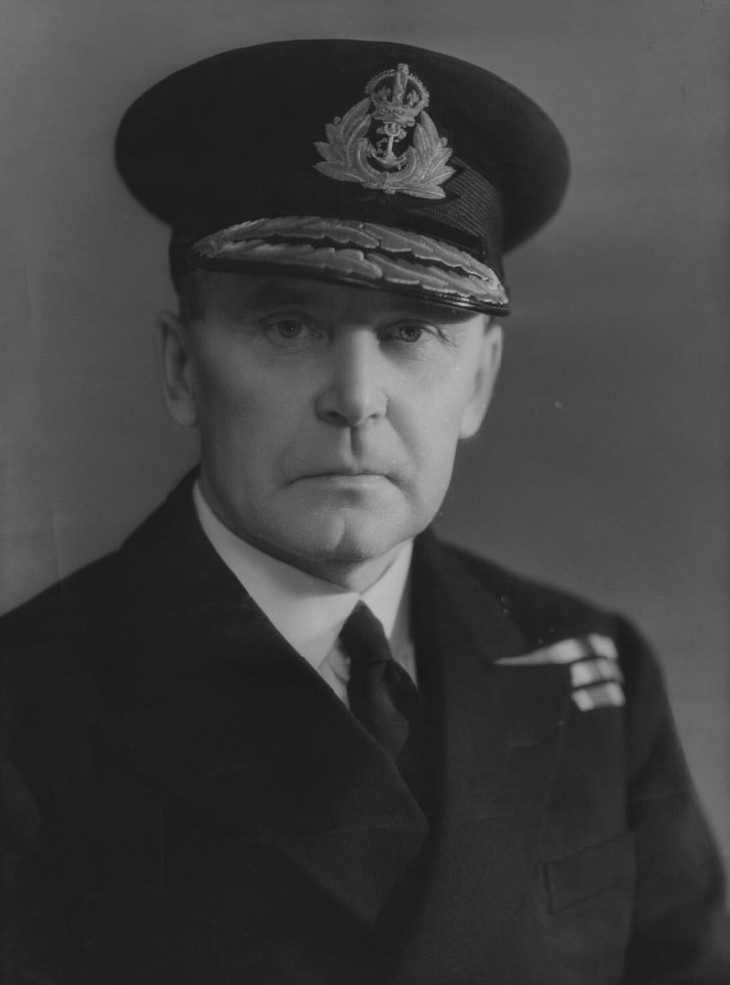
- Vice Admiral Tom Phillips in March 1940
- Born: Tom Spencer Vaughan Phillips; 19 February 1888; Pendennis Castle, Falmouth, Cornwall
- Died: 10 December 1941 (aged 53); South China Sea, off Kuantan, Malaya
- Military career
- Allegiance: United Kingdom
- Branch: Royal Navy
- Service years: 1903–1941
- Rank: Admiral
- Nickname: Tom Thumb
- Commands: Force Z (1941); Eastern Fleet (1941); China Station (1941); Home Fleet Destroyer Flotillas (1938–39); HMS Hawkins (1932–35); 6th Destroyer Flotilla (1928–29); HMS Campbell (1928–29); HMS Verbena (1924–25)
- Conflicts: First World War; Second World War; Pacific War; Malayan campaign; Sinking of Prince of Wales and Repulse †
- Awards: Knight Commander of the Order of the Bath

Admiral Sir Tom Spencer Vaughan Phillips, KCB (19 February 1888 – 10 December 1941) was a Royal Navy officer who served during the First and Second World Wars. He was nicknamed "Tom Thumb", due to his short stature. He is best known for his command of Force Z during the Japanese invasion of Malaya, where he went down with his flagship, the battleship HMS Prince of Wales. Phillips was one of the highest ranking Allied officers killed in battle during the Second World War.

== Early and private life ==
Phillips was the son of Colonel Thomas Vaughan Wynn Phillips, Royal Artillery and Louisa Mary Adeline de Horsey Phillips, daughter of Admiral Algernon de Horsey. Phillips was married to Lady Phillips, of Bude, Cornwall.

Phillips was 5 ft 4 in (163 cm) tall. At the time of his death at the age of 53, he was one of the youngest admirals in the Royal Navy and one of the youngest commanders-in-chief.

== Navy career ==
Phillips joined the Royal Navy in 1903 as a naval cadet following education at Stubbington House School. He became a midshipman in 1904 and trained aboard HMS Britannia. He was promoted to sub-lieutenant on 9 April 1908, and to lieutenant on 20 July 1909.

In the First World War, Phillips served on destroyers in the Mediterranean and in the Far East. He was promoted to lieutenant commander on 15 July 1916.

Phillips attended the Royal Navy Staff College from June 1919 to May 1920. He was a military adviser on the Permanent Advisory Commission for Naval, Military, and Air Questions Board at the League of Nations from 1920 to 1922.

Phillips was promoted to commander in June 1921, and to captain in June 1927. On 4 September 1928, he assumed command of the destroyer HMS Campbell, a position he held until August 1929.

Between 24 April 1930 and September 1932, Phillips served as assistant director of the Plans Division in the Admiralty. He then served for three years in the Far East as the flag captain of a cruiser. In 1935, he returned to the Admiralty to head the Plans Division.

In 1938, Phillips was promoted to commodore, commanding the destroyer flotillas of the Home Fleet.

On 10 January 1939, Phillips became a rear admiral after serving as an aide-de-camp to King George VI. From 1 June 1939 until 21 October 1941, Phillips was Deputy Chief of the Naval Staff and then Vice Chief of the Naval Staff.

Phillips gained the confidence of Winston Churchill, who had him appointed acting vice admiral in February 1940.

== Force Z ==
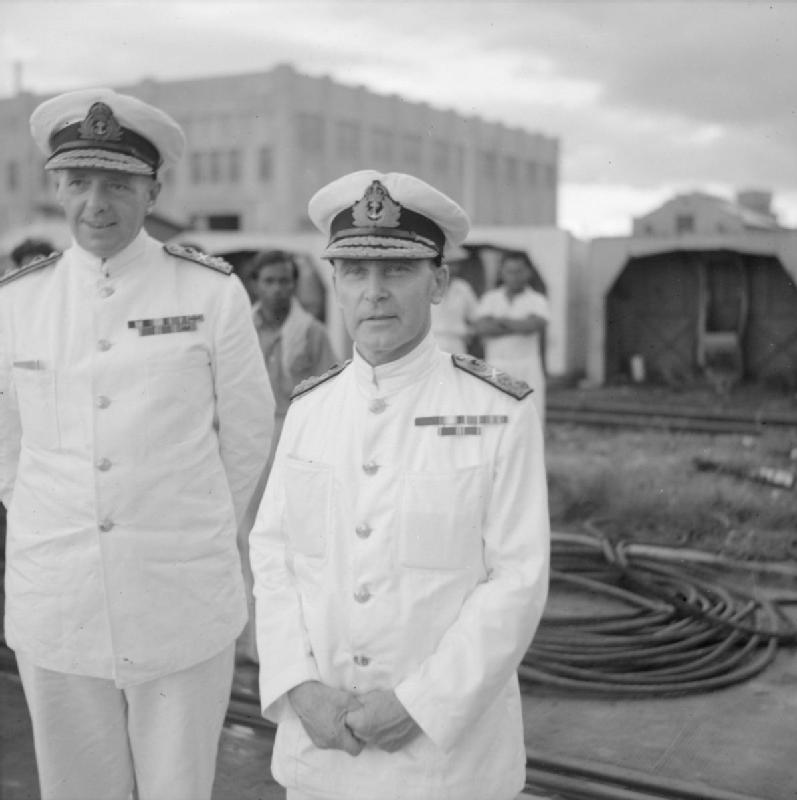
Admiral Sir Tom Phillips (right), commander of Force Z, and his deputy, Rear Admiral Arthur Palliser, on the quayside at Singapore Naval Base, 2 December 1941.

Phillips was appointed Commander-in-Chief of the China Station in late 1941, an action which raised some controversy in the higher echelons of the Royal Navy, where he was considered a "desk admiral". He was appointed acting admiral, and he took to sea on 25 October 1941 en route to his headquarters in Singapore. He travelled with a naval detachment then designated as Force G, consisting of his flagship, the new battleship HMS Prince of Wales, together with the veteran Great War-era battlecruiser HMS Repulse, and the four destroyers HMS Electra, HMS Express, HMS Encounter, and HMS Jupiter.

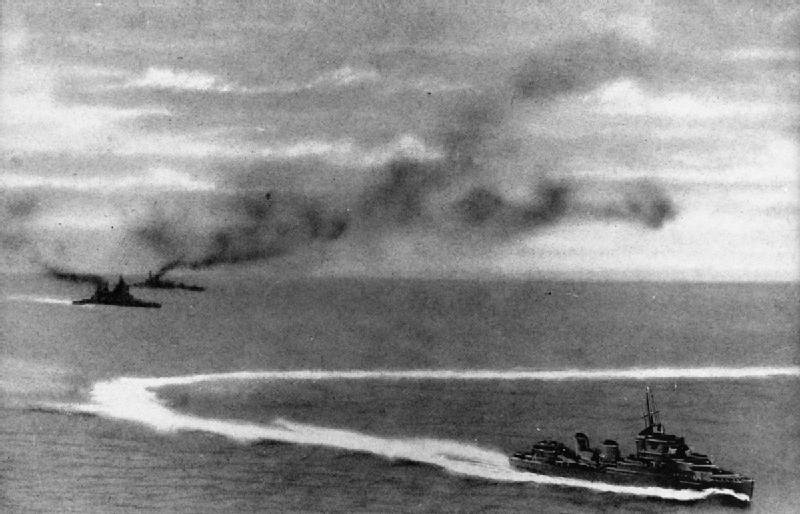
Prince of Wales (left, front) and HMS Repulse (left, behind) under Japanese air attack on 10 December 1941. A destroyer, either HMS Electra or Express, is manoeuvring in the foreground.

The deployment of the ships was a decision made by Winston Churchill. He was firmly warned against it by the First Sea Lord, Admiral of the Fleet Sir Dudley Pound, and later by his friend, Field Marshal Jan Smuts, Prime Minister of South Africa, who prophesied the fate of the capital ships, when he addressed the crew of HMS Repulse just before she left Durban for Singapore.

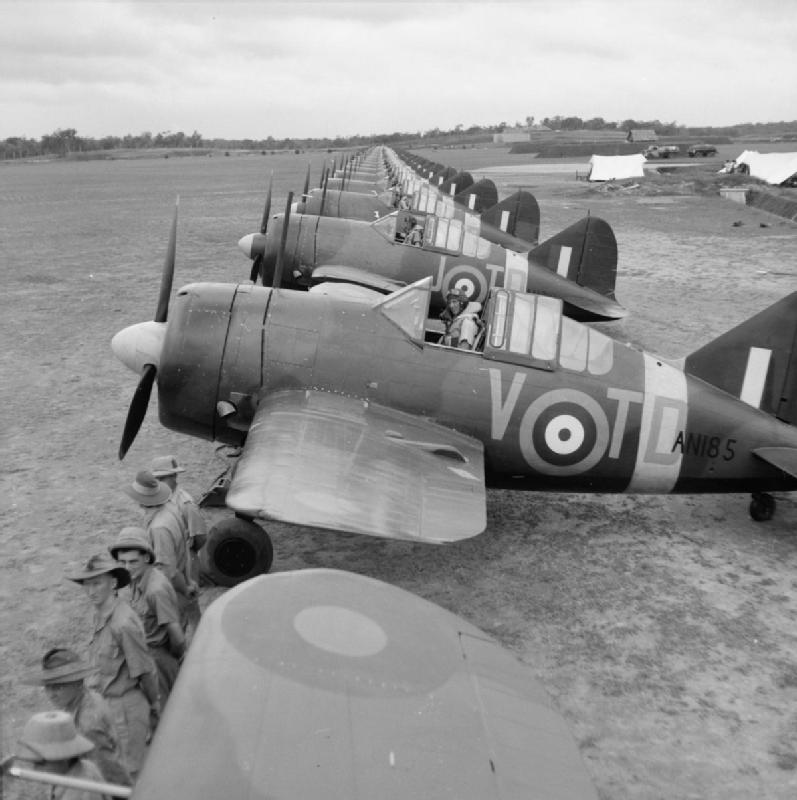
No. 453 Squadron RAAF, which was assigned to Force Z, was not scrambled until after the Japanese air attack began.

It was intended that the new aircraft carrier HMS Indomitable would also travel out to Singapore, but she ran aground on her maiden voyage in the West Indies, and was not ready to sail from England with the other ships. Phillips and the vessels arrived in Singapore on 2 December 1941, where they were re-designated Force Z. Without a formal declaration of war, the Japanese landed in Malaya on 8 December 1941, on the same day as the attack on Pearl Harbor (on the other side of the International Date Line). The Japanese, by striking at three points almost simultaneously, hoped to attract all available land-based fighters of the Royal Air Force and leave Phillips without air cover when they were ready for him; and he steamed right into this trap.

The earlier grounding of the carrier HMS Indomitable left the capital ships without naval air cover. Phillips had long held the opinion that aircraft were no threat to surface ships, and so he took Force Z, consisting of HMS Prince of Wales, HMS Repulse, and four destroyers (HMS Electra, HMS Express, HMAS Vampire and HMS Tenedos) to intercept the Japanese without air cover. That decision has been discussed ever since. Force Z sailed from Singapore at 17:35 on 8 December. Admiral Phillips left his chief of staff, Rear Admiral Arthur Palliser, at the command post ashore. Phillips used HMS Prince of Wales as his flagship.

Phillips hoped to intercept any further Japanese convoys to prevent the landing of more troops. He signalled his fleet upon departure, "We are out looking for trouble, and no doubt we shall find it. We hope to surprise the enemy transports tomorrow and we expect to meet the Japanese battleship Kongō."

Shortly after midnight, Phillips's chief of staff radioed that the Royal Air Force was so pressed by giving ground support to land operations that the Admiral could expect no air cover off Singora. Japanese heavy bombers were already in southern Indochina, and General Douglas MacArthur had been asked to send General Lewis H. Brereton's B-17 Flying Fortresses to attack their bases. By this time, the Japanese invasion force was already well established in the peninsular section of Thailand, which had already surrendered. At Kota Bharu within British Malaya, there was bitter fighting in a series of rear guard actions fought desperately by British and native troops. But by the time the British warships arrived, their opportunity had passed; the vulnerable transports were already returning to base. Admiral Phillips did not realize this.

Force Z steamed north, leaving the Anambas Islands to port. At 06:29 on 9 December, Phillips received word that destroyer Vampire had sighted an enemy plane. He was entering the Japanese air radius without air cover, but he still hoped to surprise a Japanese convoy at Singora. The task force sailed on to a position 150 miles (240 km) south of Indochina and 250 miles (400 km) east of the Malay Peninsula.

At 14:15, the Japanese submarine I-65 under command of Lieutenant Commander Harada Hakue reported sighting "two enemy battleships, course 240, speed 14 knots." I-65 surfaced and started a tail chase, but a sudden squall cloaked the British ships. While Harada continued the chase, a Kawanishi E7K "Alf" from the Japanese cruiser Kinu buzzed the I-65, mistaking it for an enemy submarine. Harada ordered a crash-dive. When the I-65 surfaced 30 minutes later, the contact with Phillips's force had been lost.

At 18:30, when the weather cleared and three Japanese naval reconnaissance planes were sighted from the flagship, Phillips realized that his position was precarious and untenable. Reluctantly, he reversed course to return to Singapore at high speed. As Phillips steamed south, dispatches from Singapore portrayed impending doom on the shores of Malaya. The British Army was falling back fast. Shortly before midnight on 9 December, word came through of an enemy landing at Kuantan, halfway between Kota Bharu and Singapore. Phillips, in view of the imminent danger to Singapore, decided to strike at Kuantan.

At dawn on 10 December, an unidentified plane was sighted about 60 miles (97 km) off Kuantan. Phillips continued on his course while launching a reconnaissance plane from Prince of Wales. The reconnaissance plane found no evidence of the enemy. The destroyer Express steamed ahead to reconnoitre the harbour of Kuantan, found it deserted, and closed with the flagship again at 08:35. Phillips had not yet realized that his intelligence from Singapore was faulty, and he continued to search for a nonexistent surface enemy, first to the northward and then to the eastward.

Ten Brewster Buffalo fighters of No. 453 Squadron RAAF at RAF Sembawang were allocated to Force Z. They were designated the Fleet Defence Squadron for this task, with Flight Lieutenant Tim Vigors given the radio procedures used by Force Z. After the war, Vigors remained bitter towards Admiral Phillips for his failure to call for air support. Phillips decided not to ask the Royal Australian Air Force for an air screen because he considered it more important to maintain radio silence. At about 1020 on 10 December, a Japanese plane was sighted shadowing Prince of Wales. The crews immediately assumed anti-aircraft stations.

At 11:00, by which time the sea was brilliantly sunlit, nine Japanese planes were sighted at an altitude 10,000 feet. They flew in single file along the length of the 32,000-ton battle cruiser Repulse. A bomb hit the catapult deck and exploded in the hangar, setting a fire below decks.

At 11:15, Captain William Tennant of Repulse radioed the RAAF for help. At 11:40, the Prince of Wales was attacked by torpedo bombers. She was hit astern, knocking out her propellers and rudder. Several waves of torpedo bombers swooped in on the Repulse. The Prince of Wales signalled, asking whether she had been hit. The Repulse replied, "We have avoided 19 torpedoes till now, thanks to Providence." Australian air protection was still not on hand at 12:20 p.m. CBS reporter Cecil Brown, who was on board the Repulse, described the battle:

"Stand by for barrage," comes over the ship's communication system. One plane is circling around. It's now at 300 or 400 yards, approaching us from the port side. It's coming closer head-on, and I see a torpedo drop. A watcher shouts, "Stand by for torpedo", and the tin fish is streaking directly for us.

Some one says: "This one's got us."

The torpedo struck the side on which I was standing, about twenty yards astern of my position. It felt like the ship had crashed into a well-rooted dock. It threw me four feet across the deck, but I did not fall, and I did not feel any explosion—just this very great jar.

Almost immediately, it seemed, we began to list, and less than a minute later there was another jar of the same kind and same force, except that it was almost precisely the same spot on the starboard.

After the first torpedo, the communications system coolly announced: 'Blow up your lifebelts.' I was in this process when the second torpedo struck, and the settling ship and crazy angle were so apparent that I didn't continue blowing the belt.

The communications system announced: "Prepare to abandon ship. May God be with you."

Prince of Wales and Repulse were sunk by Japanese air attack on 10 December 1941 by 86 Japanese bombers and torpedo bombers from the 22nd Air Flotilla based at Saigon. The destroyers saved 2,081 of the 2,921 crew on the stricken capital ships, but 840 sailors were lost. Prince of Wales Captain John Leach and Phillips went down with their ship. As both the British warships sank, the RAAF planes finally appeared.

== Aftermath of the sinking of Prince of Wales and Repulse ==
After the destruction of the British fleet, the Japanese continued to advance in Malaya. British Lieutenant General Arthur Percival ordered a retreat from Malaya to Singapore on 27 January 1942. On 15 February, Percival surrendered his remaining army of 85,000 British, Indian, and Australian troops to the Japanese, the largest capitulation in British history.

Regarding Phillips's decision to proceed without air cover, Naval historian Samuel Eliot Morison wrote:

Those who make the decisions in war are constantly weighing certain risks against possible gains. At the outset of hostilities [U.S.] Admiral Hart thought of sending his small striking force north of Luzon to challenge Japanese communications, but decided that the risk to his ships outweighed the possible gain because the enemy had won control of the air. Admiral Phillips had precisely the same problem in Malaya. Should he steam into the Gulf of Siam and expose his ships to air attack from Indochina in the hope of breaking enemy communications with their landing force? He decided to take the chance. With the Royal Air Force and the British Army fighting for their lives, the Royal Navy could not be true to its tradition by remaining idly at anchor.

Morison wrote, that as a result of the sinking of Prince of Wales and Repulse:

...[T]he half-truth "Capital ships cannot withstand land-based air power" became elevated to the dignity of a tactical principle that none dared take the risk to disprove. And the Japanese had disposed of the only Allied battleship and battle cruiser in the Pacific Ocean west of Hawaii. The Allies lost face throughout the Orient and began to lose confidence in themselves.

U.S. Admiral Thomas Hart, Phillips's American counterpart, was critical of the air support to Force Z. He was unaware of Phillips's change of plan and preference for radio silence at the time. Hart told Time magazine in 1942:

The only thing that would have saved Singapore would have been the success of Admiral Sir Tom Phillips's attempt to place his heavy ships where they could sink the Japanese transports at sea. We have never heard why the R.A.F. fighters, which were half an hour away, gave Admiral Phillips no help whatever.

Phillips's name is inscribed at the Plymouth Naval Memorial in Plymouth, England.

== Notes ==
1. The others were Soviet Red Army Generals Ivan Chernyakhovsky and Nikolai Vatutin, Chinese National Army Lieutenant-General Zhang Zizhong (at the time of his death holding acting full general rank), and Italian Regia Marina Ammiraglio di Squadra Carlo Bergamini. U.S. Army Lieutenant Generals Lesley J. McNair and Simon Bolivar Buckner Jr. were posthumously promoted to the rank of General decades after being killed.

== Citations ==
Military offices
| Preceded by Sir Andrew Cunningham | Deputy Chief of the Naval Staff; 1939 – 1940 | Vacant Title next held by Robert Oliver |
| Preceded by Himself as Deputy Chief of the Naval Staff | Vice Chief of the Naval Staff; 1940 – 1941 | Succeeded by Henry Moore |
| Preceded by Sir Geoffrey Layton as Commander-in-Chief, China Station | Commander-in-Chief, Eastern Fleet; 1941 | Succeeded by Sir Geoffrey Layton |
