= Robert Don Oliver =

Royal Navy Vice Admiral (1895–1980)

Vice-Admiral Robert Oliver CB CBE DSC DL
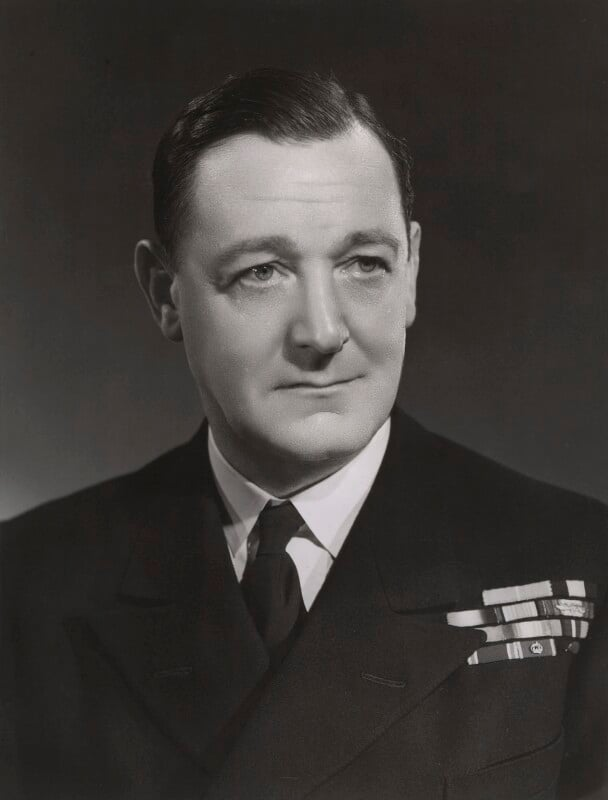
- Oliver in 1946
- Born: 17 March 1895
- Died: 6 October 1980 (aged 85)
- Military career
- Branch: Royal Navy
- Service years: 1908–1948
- Rank: Vice-Admiral
- Commands: HMS Iron Duke; HMS Devonshire; HMS Excellent; HMS Swiftsure
- Conflicts: World War I World War II
- Awards: Companion of the Order of the Bath; Commander of the Order of the British Empire; Distinguished Service Cross

Vice-Admiral Robert Don Oliver (17 March 1895 – 6 October 1980) was a Royal Navy officer who was appointed Deputy Chief of the Naval Staff.

== Naval career ==
Oliver served in World War I taking part in the Battle of the Falkland Islands in 1914, fighting at Gallipoli in 1915 and then undertaking mine-laying off the German and Belgian coast. Promoted to captain, he was given command of HMS Iron Duke in 1939.

He also served in World War II and was commanding HMS Devonshire, a heavy cruiser, on 21 November 1941, when he was informed that codebreakers had determined that German U-boats were going to be surfacing near him, to refuel from a merchant raider, the Hilfskreuzer (cruiser) Atlantis. Using the intelligence, Devonshire sunk Atlantis. He later commanded the gunnery school HMS Excellent and then the cruiser HMS Swiftsure.

After the War he was appointed Assistant Chief of Naval Staff (Weapons) and then Deputy Chief of the Naval Staff in 1946. His last appointment, in 1947, was as Flag Officer commanding the 5th Cruiser Squadron, before he retired on 26 September 1948, and was promoted to vice-admiral on the same day.

In retirement he became Deputy Lieutenant of Roxburghshire.

== Family ==
In 1928 he married Torfrida Lois Acantha Huddart; there were no children. Following the death of his first wife, he married Mrs M.J. Glendinning van der Velde in 1965.

Military offices
Vacant Title last held by Sir Tom Phillips	Deputy Chief of the Naval Staff; 1946–1947	Vacant Title next held by Sir Edward Evans-Lombe
