= Deputy Chief of the Naval Staff (United Kingdom) =

UK naval appointment

- Ensign of the Royal Navy

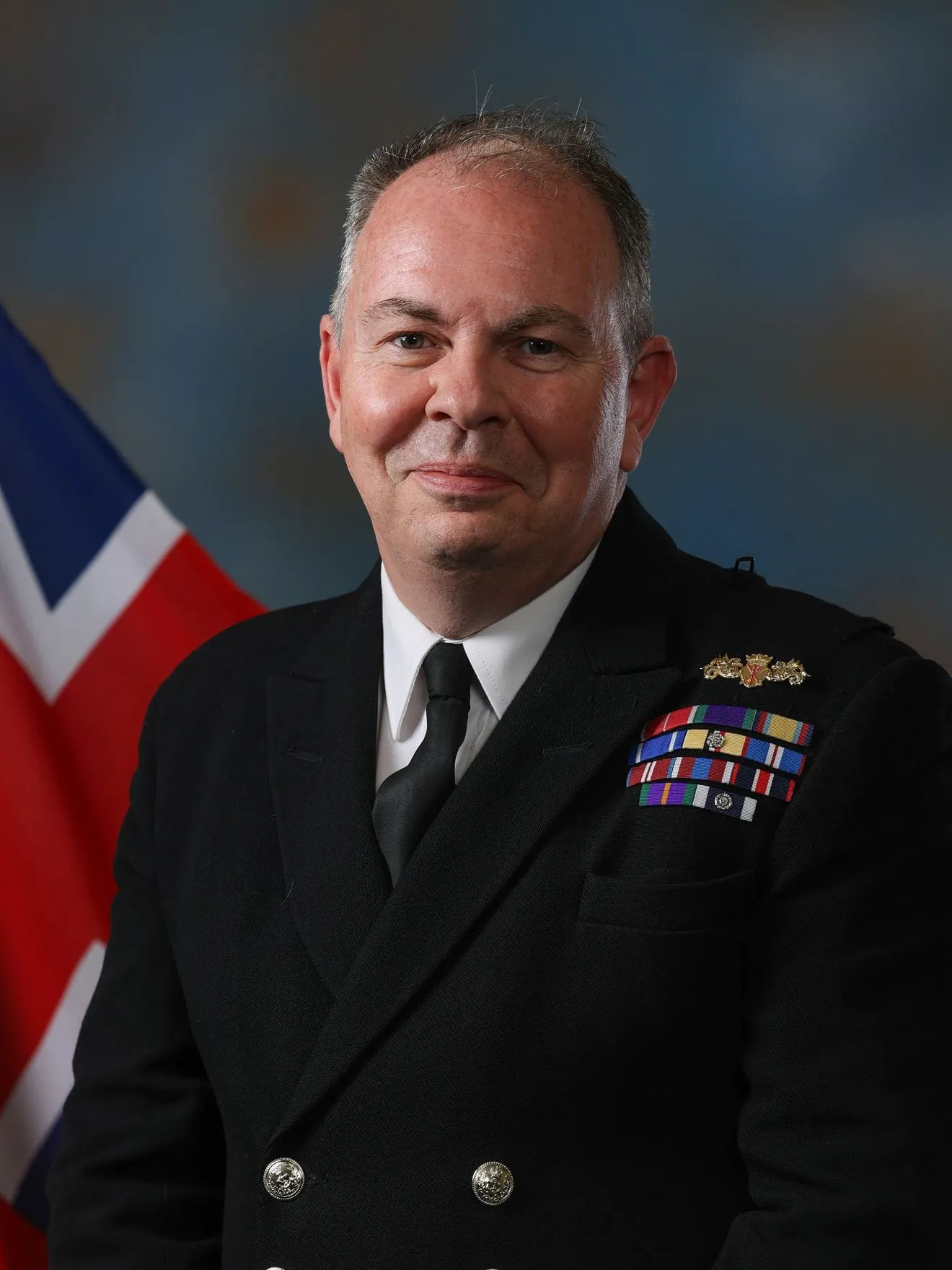
- Incumbent; Vice Admiral Paul Beattie since 30 September 2025
- Ministry of Defence
- Abbreviation: DCNS
- Member of: Board of Admiralty, Admiralty Board, Navy Board
- Reports to: First Sea Lord
- Nominator: First Lord of the Admiralty, Secretary of State for Defence
- Appointer: Prime Minister; Subject to formal approval by the King-in-Council
- Term length: Not fixed; (typically 1–3 years)
- Formation: 1917–1968, 2013–current
- First holder: Vice Admiral Henry Oliver

The Deputy Chief of the Naval Staff (DCNS) is a senior appointment in the Royal Navy currently held by the Second Sea Lord. The incumbent is usually a three-star rank and had a NATO ranking code of OF-8, but the position has previously been held by an acting two-star ranked officer and a four-star ranked officer.

== First and Second World Wars ==
The position was originally established in 1917 on the Board of Admiralty. It essentially replaced the position of Chief of the Admiralty War Staff.

The first incumbent was Vice Admiral Henry Oliver, the Chief of the Admiralty War Staff, who was appointed Deputy Chief of Naval Staff on 31 May 1917. The duties of the Deputy Chief of the Naval Staff, were shared with the First Sea Lord and Chief of the Naval Staff and with the Assistant Chief of the Naval Staff.

In September 1917 the new post of Deputy First Sea Lord was created to meet the demand of wartime operational requirements. The Deputy Chief of the Naval Staff then reported to the Deputy First Sea Lord until 1919 when that post was abolished. The Deputy Chief of the Naval Staff then resumed his previous role and reported to the First Sea Lord until 1941. Duties as of 1917 included:

1. Relieve the First Sea Lord of all the routine matters dealt with by sections under his immediate direction
2. Fleet Movements
3. All operations in the North Sea, the White Sea, the Baltic, and the Dover Area, except British coastal measures for the protection of trade
4. Offensive measures in the Mediterranean and abroad generally
5. The protection of trade in the North Sea, except the coastal trade on the East Coast of Great Britain. North Sea trade includes the Dutch trade, trade between Scandinavian countries and Great Britain, and Baltic trade, but not convoy from Lerwick, Southward
6. All questions relating to foreign stations, except protection of trade against submarine and mine attack
7. Policy of blockade and all questions relating thereto and to contraband of war
8. Organisation, movements and protection of troop transports and other vessels against attack by surface vessels; Atlantic convoys other than troop convoys being under the Assistant Chief of the Naval Staff

This remained in place until 1939. Duties after 1939 included:

1. Operations of War: All large Questions of Naval Policy and Maritime Warfare
2. Fighting and Sea-going Efficiency of the Fleet and its Organisation
3. Distribution and Movements of all Ships in Commission and in Reserve
4. Superintendence of the Naval Staff and the Hydrographic Department
5. Administering Naval communications
6. Superintendence of the Assistant Chief of the Naval Staff
7. Superintendence of the Director of the Naval Intelligence Division

In 1941 the DCNS post was renamed Vice Chief of the Naval Staff; this continued until 1946. After the Second World War the title was changed back to DCNS, and continued until 1968.

== From 2013 ==
In 2013 the office was brought back once more and the current Deputy Chief of the Naval Staff became both a member of the Admiralty Board and a member of the Navy Board of the Ministry of Defence.

Duties circa March 2014 included:

- Full command of all deployable Fleet units including the Royal Marines
- Responsible for providing ships, submarines, aircraft and Royal Marine units ready in all respects for any operations that the UK Government requires
- Responsible for the delivery of the Naval Service's current and future personnel, equipment and infrastructure

== Deputy Chiefs of the Naval Staff ==
Incumbents include:

No.	Portrait	Deputy Chief	Took office	Left office	Time in office	Ref.
1	Sir Henry Oliver	Vice Admiral; Sir Henry Oliver (1865–1965)	July 1917	January 1918	6 months	.
2	Sir Sydney Fremantle	Acting Vice Admiral; Sir Sydney Fremantle (1867–1958)	January 1918	May 1919	1 year, 4 months	.
3	Sir James Fergusson	Rear Admiral; Sir James Fergusson (1871–1942)	May 1919	August 1919	3 months	.
4	Sir Osmond Brock	Vice Admiral; Sir Osmond Brock (1869–1947)	August 1919	November 1921	2 years, 3 months	
5	Sir Roger Keyes	Vice Admiral; Sir Roger Keyes (1872–1945)	November 1921	May 1925	3 years, 6 months	
6	Sir Frederick Field	Vice Admiral; Sir Frederick Field (1871–1945)	May 1925	May 1928	3 years	
7	Sir William Wordsworth Fisher	Vice Admiral; Sir William Wordsworth Fisher (1875–1937)	May 1928	June 1930	2 years, 1 month	
8	Sir Frederic Charles Dreyer	Admiral; Sir Frederic Charles Dreyer (1878–1956)	June 1930	January 1933	2 years, 7 months	
9	Sir Charles Little	Vice Admiral; Sir Charles Little (1882–1973)	January 1933	October 1935	2 years, 9 months	
10	Sir William James	Vice Admiral; Sir William James (1881–1973)	October 1935	October 1938	3 years	
11	Sir Andrew Cunningham	Vice Admiral; Sir Andrew Cunningham (1883–1963)	October 1938	May 1939	7 months	
12	Sir Tom Phillips	Vice Admiral; Sir Tom Phillips (1888–1941)	June 1939	October 1941	2 years, 5 months	

Note: Post is renamed 1941 to 1946 its responsibilities are taken over by the Vice Chief of the Naval Staff

No.	Portrait	Deputy Chief	Took office	Left office	Time in office	Ref.
1	Robert Don Oliver	Rear Admiral; Robert Don Oliver (1895–1980)	April 1946	April 1947	1 year	.
2	Sir Edward Evans-Lombe	Vice Admiral; Sir Edward Evans-Lombe (1901–1974)	December 1950	January 1953	2 years, 1 month	.
3	Sir Geoffrey Barnard	Rear Admiral; Sir Geoffrey Barnard (1901–1974)	January 1953	April 1954	1 year, 3 months	
4	Sir Eric Clifford	Vice Admiral; Sir Eric Clifford (1900–1964)	April 1954	September 1957	3 years, 5 months	

Note: From 1957 to 1965 the post was held jointly by the Fifth Sea Lord

No.	Portrait	Deputy Chief	Took office	Left office	Time in office	Ref.
1	Sir Manley Power	Vice Admiral; Sir Manley Power (1904–1981)	October 1957	February 1959	1 year, 4 months	.
2	Sir Laurence Durlacher	Admiral; Sir Laurence Durlacher (1904–1986)	February 1959	January 1962	2 years, 11 months	
3	Sir Peter Gretton	Vice Admiral; Sir Peter Gretton (1912–1992)	January 1962	January 1963	1 year	
4	Sir Frank Hopkins	Vice Admiral; Sir Frank Hopkins (1910–1990)	January 1963	March 1966	3 years, 2 months	
5	Sir Richard Janvrin	Vice Admiral; Sir Richard Janvrin (1915–1993)	March 1966	October 1968	2 years, 7 months	

Note: Post was vacant from 1969 to 2012; it was re-established in 2013. From 2013 to 2015 it was held by the Fleet Commander and from 2016 it was held by the Second Sea Lord

No.	Portrait	Deputy Chief	Took office	Left office	Time in office	Ref.
1	Sir Philip Jones	Vice Admiral; Sir Philip Jones (born 1960)	30 November 2012	8 April 2016	3 years, 130 days	
2	Jonathan Woodcock	Vice Admiral; Jonathan Woodcock (born 1962)	8 April 2016	27 March 2018	1 year, 353 days	
3	Tony Radakin	Vice Admiral; Tony Radakin (born 1965)	27 March 2018	26 April 2019	1 year, 30 days	
4	Nick Hine	Vice Admiral; Nick Hine (born 1966)	26 April 2019	12 January 2022	2 years, 261 days	
5	Martin Connell	Vice Admiral; Martin Connell (born 1968)	12 January 2022	30 September 2025	3 years, 261 days	
6	Paul Beattie	Vice Admiral; Paul Beattie	30 September 2025	Incumbent	1 year, 3 days	

== See also ==
- Assistant Chief of the Naval Staff
- Vice Chief of the Naval Staff
- First Sea Lord
- Second Sea Lord
- Third Sea Lord
- Fourth Sea Lord
- Fifth Sea Lord

== Attribution ==
Primary source for this article is by Harley, Simon and Lovell, Tony, (2016) Deputy Chief of Naval Staff, The Dreadnought Project, http://dreadnoughtproject.org.

== Sources ==
- Rodger. N.A.M., (1979) The Admiralty (offices of state), T. Dalton, Lavenham, ISBN 978-0900963940.
- Naval Staff, Training and Staff Duties Division (1929). The Naval Staff of the Admiralty. Its Work and Development. B.R. 1845 (late C.B. 3013). Copy at The National Archives. ADM 234/434.
- Mackie, Colin, (2010–2014), British Armed Services between 1860 and the present day — I Royal Navy – Senior Appointments, http://www.gulabin.com/.
