= HMS Repulse (1916) =

1916 Renown-class battlecruiser of the Royal Navy

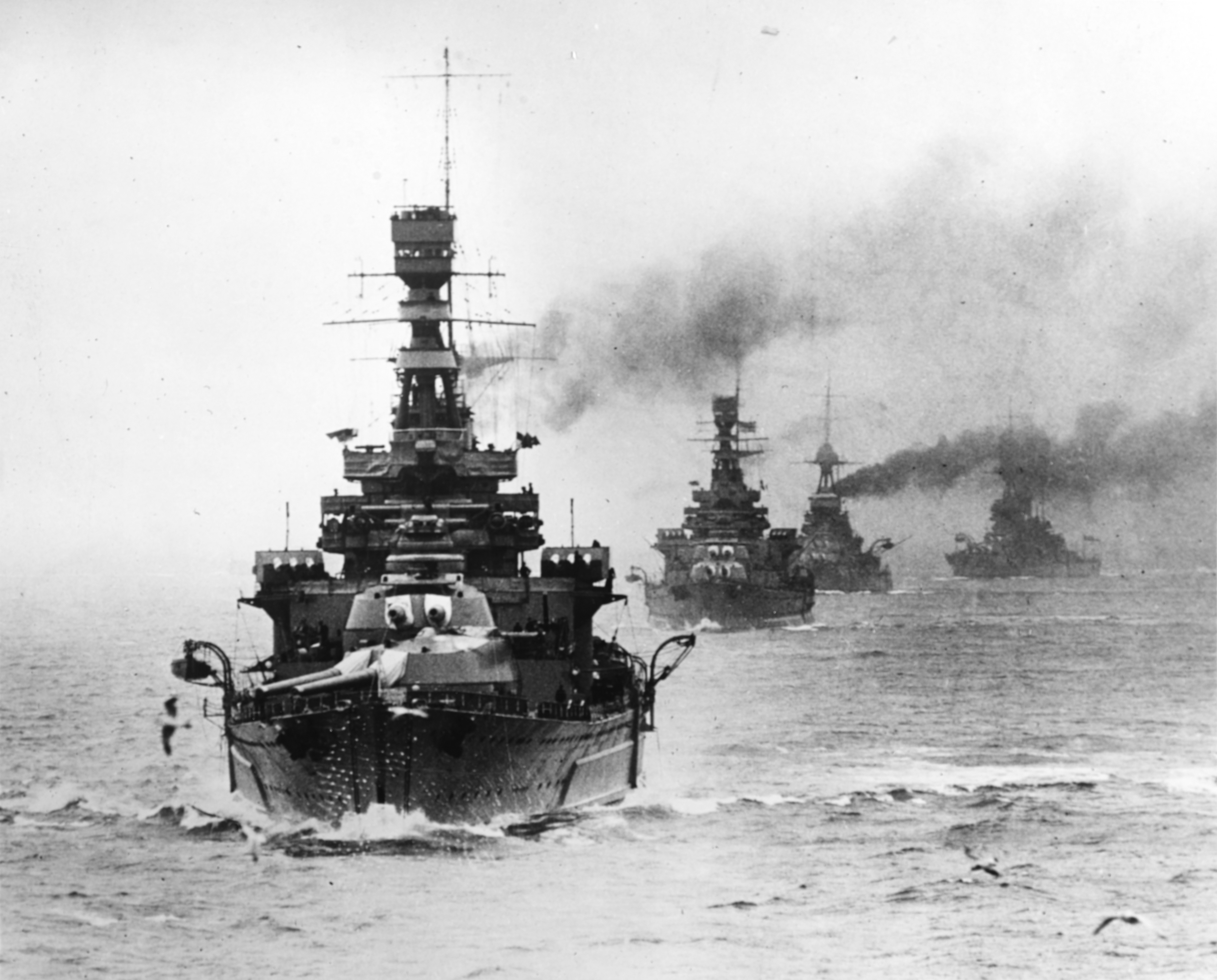
- Repulse with other capital ships of the Atlantic Fleet on manoeuvres in the 1920s

History

United Kingdom
- Name: Repulse
- Ordered: 30 December 1914
- Builder: John Brown & Company, Clydebank
- Laid down: 25 January 1915
- Launched: 8 January 1916
- Commissioned: 18 August 1916
- Identification: Pennant number: 34
- Motto: Qui Tangit Frangitur; Who touches me is broken
- Nickname(s): Repair
- Fate: Sunk by Japanese bombers, 10 December 1941

General characteristics (as built)
- Class & type: Renown-class battlecruiser
- Displacement: 27,200 long tons (27,636 t) (normal); 32,220 long tons (32,737 t) (deep load)
- Length: 750 ft 2 in (228.7 m) p.p.; 794 ft 1.5 in (242 m) (o.a.)
- Beam: 90 ft 1.75 in (27.5 m)
- Draught: 27 ft (8.2 m)
- Installed power: 42 × water-tube boilers; 112,000 shp (84,000 kW)
- Propulsion: 4 × shafts, 2 × steam turbine sets,
- Speed: 31.5 knots (58.3 km/h; 36.2 mph)
- Crew: 967; 1,222 (1919)
- Armament: 3 × twin 15 in (381 mm) guns; 5 × triple, 2 × single 4 in (102 mm) guns; 2 × single 3 in (76 mm) AA guns; 2 × 21 in (533 mm) torpedo tubes
- Armour: Belt: 3–6 in (76–152 mm); Decks: 1–2.5 in (25–64 mm); Barbettes: 4–7 in (102–178 mm); Gun turrets: 7–9 in (178–229 mm); Conning tower: 10 in (254 mm); Bulkheads: 3–4 in (76–102 mm)

General characteristics (1939)
- Displacement: 34,600 long tons (35,155 t)
- Draught: 29 ft 8 in (9 m)
- Installed power: 8 × boilers, 112,000 shp (84,000 kW)
- Propulsion: 4 × shafts, 4 × steam turbines
- Speed: 31 knots (57 km/h; 36 mph)
- Range: 6,650 nmi (12,320 km; 7,650 mi)
- Complement: 1,181; 1,309 (December 1941)
- Armament: 3 × twin 15 in (381 mm) guns; 3 × triple 4 in (102 mm) guns; 6 × single 4 in (102 mm) AA guns; 2 × quadruple 40 mm (1.6 in) 2-pdr AA guns
- Armour: Belt: 2–9 in (51–229 mm); Decks: 1–4 in (25–102 mm); otherwise no change
- Aircraft carried: 4 × seaplanes
- Aviation facilities: 1 × aircraft catapult

HMS Repulse was one of two Renown-class battlecruisers built for the Royal Navy during the First World War. Originally laid down as an improved version of the Revenge-class battleship, her construction was suspended on the outbreak of war because she would not be ready in time. Admiral Lord Fisher, upon becoming First Sea Lord, gained approval for her to resume construction as a battlecruiser that could be built and enter service quickly. The Director of Naval Construction (DNC), Eustace Tennyson-d'Eyncourt, quickly produced an entirely new design to meet Admiral Lord Fisher's requirements, and the builders agreed to deliver the ship in 15 months. They did not quite meet that ambitious goal, but the ship was delivered a few months after the Battle of Jutland in 1916. Repulse and her sister ship Renown were the world's fastest capital ships upon completion.

Repulse participated in the Second Battle of Heligoland Bight in 1917, the only combat she saw during the war. She was reconstructed twice between the wars; a reconstruction in the 1920s increased her armour protection and made lesser improvements, while another in the 1930s was much more thorough. Repulse accompanied the battlecruiser Hood during the Cruise of the Special Service Squadron on a round-the-world cruise in 1923 to 1924 and protected international shipping during the Spanish Civil War in 1936 to 1939.

The ship spent the first months of the Second World War hunting for German raiders and blockade runners. She participated in the Norwegian Campaign of April to June 1940 and searched for the Bismarck in 1941. Repulse escorted a troop convoy around the Cape of Good Hope from August to October 1941 and was transferred to the East Indies Command. She was assigned in November to Force Z, which was supposed to deter Japanese aggression against British possessions in the Far East. Repulse and her consort, the battleship Prince of Wales, were sunk by Japanese aircraft on 10 December 1941, when they attempted to intercept landings in British Malaya.

In December 2023, a memorial was erected at Teluk Cempedak beach, commemorating both Repulse and Prince of Wales. The memorial was unveiled by King Abdullah of Pahang.

== Design and description ==
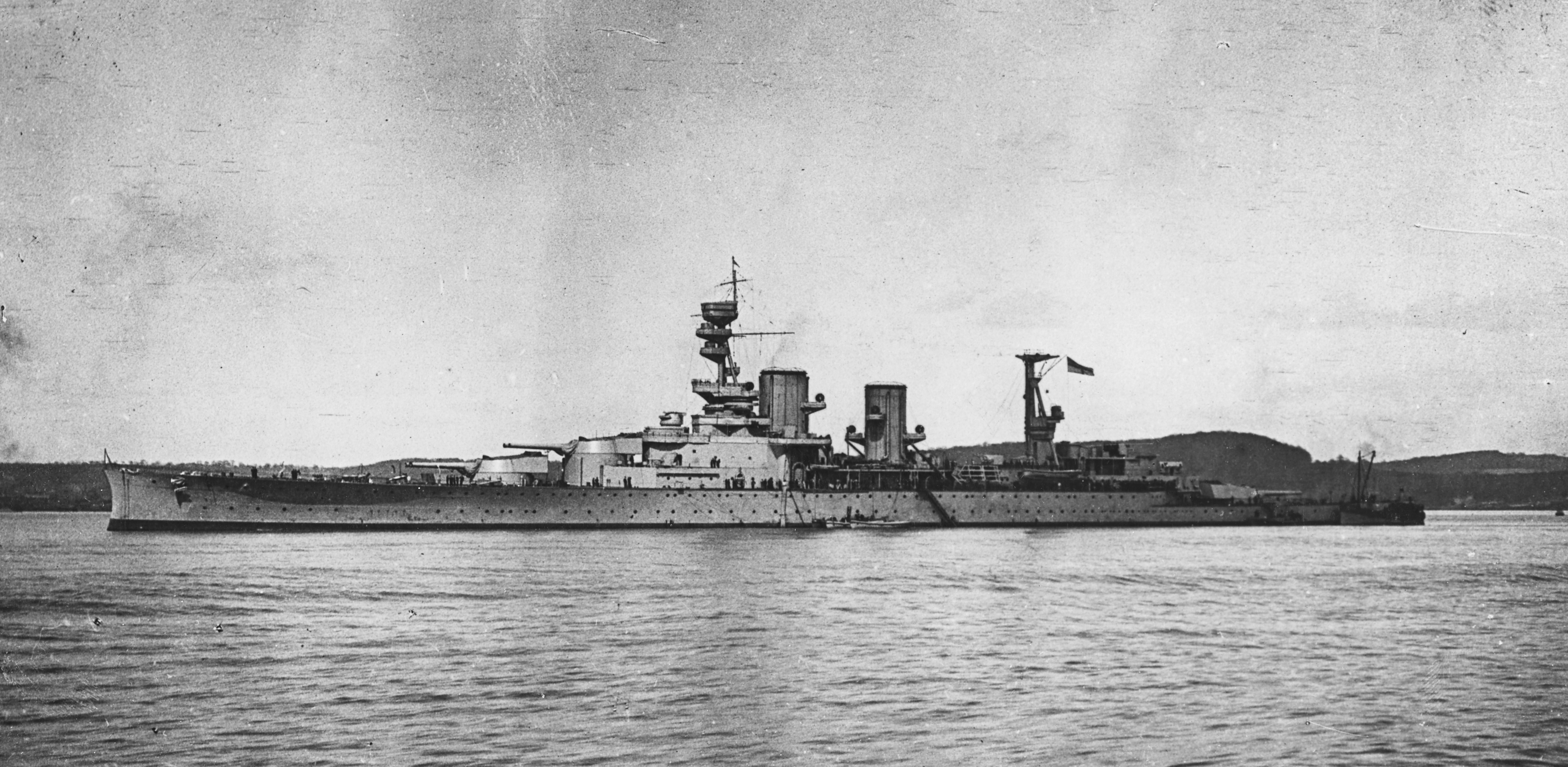
Repulse, c. 1916–1917, after post-trials alterations

Admiral Lord Fisher first presented his requirements for the new ships to the DNC on 18 December 1914, before the ships had even been approved. He wanted a long, flared bow, like that on the pre-dreadnought Renown, but higher, four 15-inch guns in two twin-gun turrets, an antitorpedo boat armament of twenty 4-inch (102 mm) guns mounted high up and protected by gun shields only, a speed of 32 knots using oil fuel, and armour on the scale of the battlecruiser Indefatigable. Within a few days, Fisher increased the number of guns to six and added two torpedo tubes. Minor revisions in the initial estimate were made until 26 December, and a preliminary design was completed on 30 December.

During the following week, the DNC's department examined the material delivered for the two battleships and decided what could be used in the new design. The usable material was transferred to the builders, who had received enough information from the DNC's department to lay the keels of both ships on 25 January 1915, well before the altered contracts were completed on 10 March.

Repulse had an overall length of 794 feet 2.5 inches (242.1 m), a beam of 89 feet 11.5 inches (27.4 m), and a maximum draught of 29 feet 9 inches (9.1 m). She displaced 26,854 long tons (27,285 t) at normal load and 31,592 long tons (32,099 t) at deep load. The Brown-Curtis direct-drive steam turbines were designed to produce 112,000 shaft horsepower (84,000 kW), which would propel the ship at 32 knots (59 km/h; 37 mph). During trials in 1916, Repulse's turbines provided 118,913 shp (88,673 kW), allowing her to reach a speed of 31.73 knots (58.76 km/h; 36.51 mph). The ship normally carried 1,000 long tons (1,016 t) of fuel oil, but had a maximum capacity of 4,289 long tons (4,358 t). At full capacity, she could steam at a speed of 18 knots (33 km/h; 21 mph) for 4,000 nautical miles (7,408 km; 4,603 mi).

The ship mounted six 42-calibre BL 15-inch Mk I guns in three twin hydraulically powered gun turrets, A, B, and Y, from front to rear. Her secondary armament consisted of 17 BL 4-inch Mark IX guns, fitted in five triple and two single mounts. Repulse mounted a pair of QF 3-inch 20 cwt (Note: "cwt" is the abbreviation for hundredweight, 30 cwt referring to the weight of the gun.) antiaircraft guns mounted on the shelter deck abreast of the rear funnel. She mounted two submerged tubes for 21-inch (533 mm) torpedoes, one on each side forward of A barbette.

Repulse's waterline belt of Krupp cemented armour measured 6 inches (152 mm) thick amidships. Her gun turrets were 7–9 inches (178–229 mm) thick with roofs 4.25 inches (108 mm) thick. As designed, the high-tensile-steel decks ranged from 0.75 to 1.5 inches (19 to 38 mm) in thickness. After the Battle of Jutland in 1916, while the ship was still completing, an extra inch of high-tensile steel was added on the main deck over the magazines. Repulse was fitted with a shallow antitorpedo bulge integral to the hull, which was intended to explode the torpedo before it hit the hull proper and vent the underwater explosion to the surface rather than into the ship.

Despite these additions, the ship was still felt to be too vulnerable to plunging fire, and Repulse was refitted in Rosyth between 10 November 1916 and 29 January 1917 with additional horizontal armour, weighing around 504 long tons (512 t), added to the decks over the magazines and over the steering gear. Repulse was the first capital ship fitted with a flying-off platform when an experimental one was fitted on B turret in the autumn of 1917. Squadron Leader Frederick Rutland took off in a Sopwith Pup on 1 October. Another platform was built on Y turret, and Rutland took off from it on 8 October. One fighter and a reconnaissance aircraft were normally carried.

== Service history ==
=== First World War ===
Repulse was laid down by John Brown, Clydebank, Scotland, on 25 January 1915. The ship was launched on 8 January 1916 and completed on 18 August 1916, after the Battle of Jutland. Her construction cost £2,829,087 (£169,690,000 in 2025). She served with the Grand Fleet in the North Sea during the remaining two years of the First World War. Repulse relieved Lion as flagship of the 1st Battlecruiser Squadron for the duration of the war.

==== Second Battle of Heligoland Bight ====
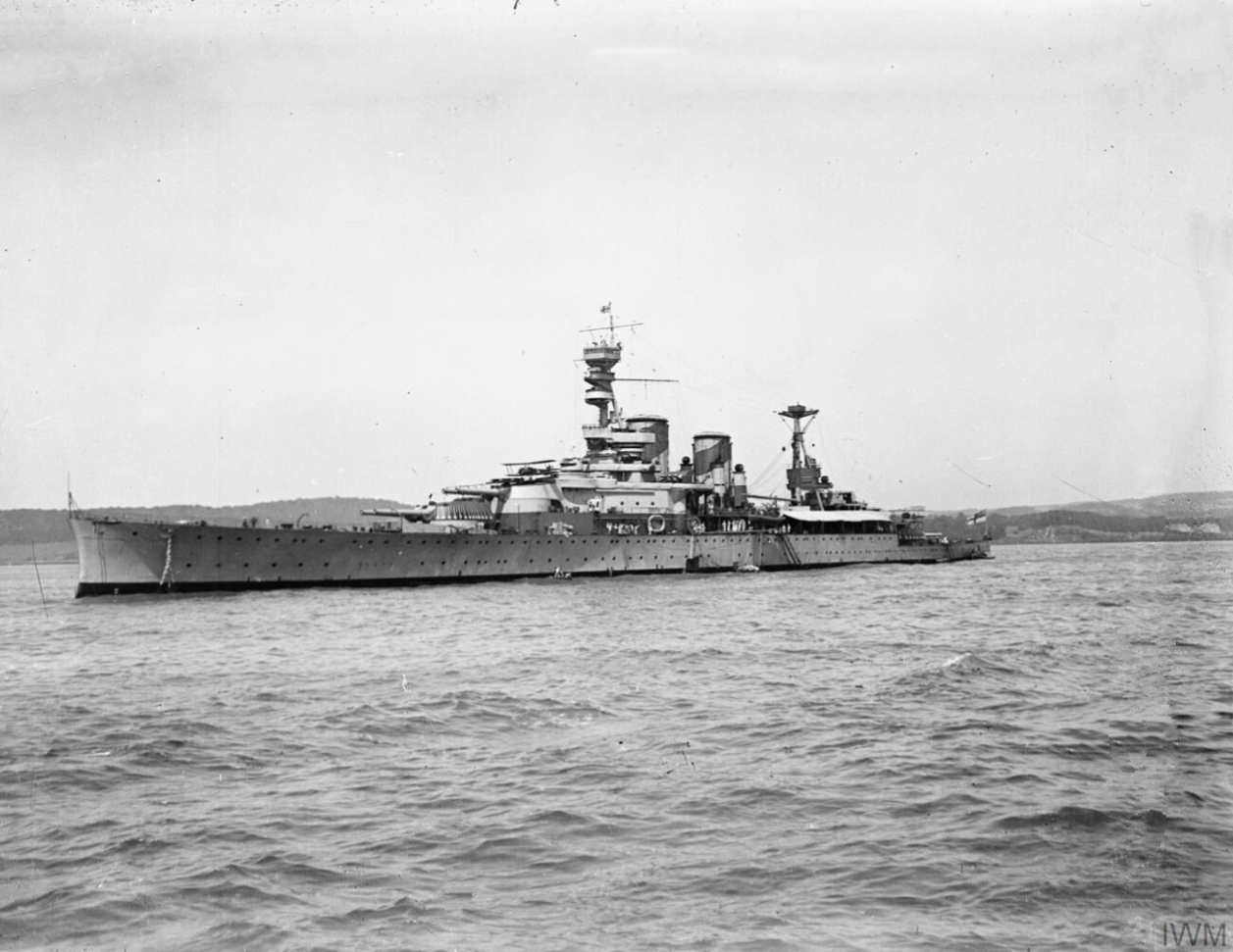
Repulse in the Firth of Forth serving as the flagship of the 1st Battlecruiser Squadron, 1918

Over the course of 1917, the Admiralty became more concerned about German efforts in the North Sea to sweep paths through the British-laid minefields intended to restrict the actions of the High Seas Fleet and German submarines. A preliminary raid on German minesweeping forces on 31 October by light forces destroyed 10 small ships, so the Admiralty decided on a larger operation to destroy the minesweepers and their escorting light cruisers. Based on intelligence reports, the Admiralty decided on 17 November 1917 to allocate two light cruiser squadrons, the 1st Cruiser Squadron covered by the reinforced 1st BCS (less Renown), and more distantly, the battleships of the 1st Battle Squadron to the operation.

The German ships, four light cruisers of II Scouting Force, eight destroyers, three divisions of minesweepers, eight Sperrbrechers (cork-filled trawlers, used to detonate mines without sinking) and two trawlers to mark the swept route, were spotted at 07:30, (Note: The times used in this article are in UTC, which is one hour behind CET, which is often used in German works.) silhouetted by the rising sun. The light battlecruiser Courageous and the light cruiser Cardiff opened fire with their forward guns 7 minutes later. The Germans responded by laying an effective smoke screen. The British continued in pursuit, but lost track of most of the smaller ships in the smoke and concentrated fire on the light cruisers as opportunity permitted. Repulse was detached not long after and raced forward at full speed to engage the enemy ships. She opened fire around 09:00, scoring a single hit on the light cruiser SMS Königsberg during the battle. When the German battleships SMS Kaiser and SMS Kaiserin were spotted about 09:50, the British broke off their pursuit and Repulse covered their retreat, aided by a heavy fog that came down around 10:40. The ship fired a total of 54 15-inch shells during the battle and scored one hit on the light cruiser Königsberg that temporarily reduced her speed.

On 12 December 1917, Repulse was damaged in a collision with the battlecruiser HMAS Australia. The ship was present at the surrender of the High Seas Fleet at Scapa Flow on 21 November 1918.

=== Inter-war period ===
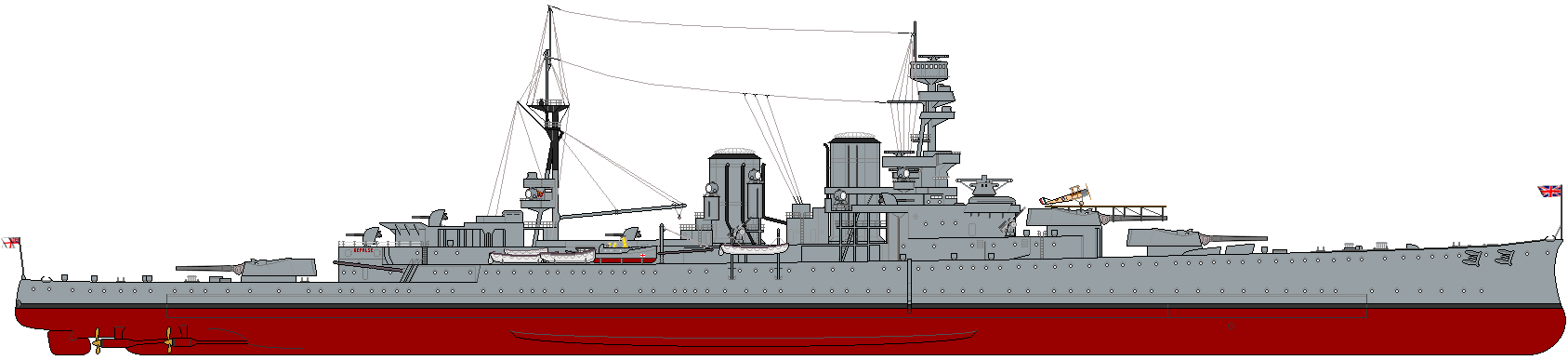
Repulse in 1919

Repulse began a major refit at Portsmouth on 17 December 1918 intended to drastically improve her armour protection. Her existing 6-inch armour belt was replaced by 9-inch (229 mm) armour plates made surplus by the conversion of the battleship Almirante Cochrane (originally ordered by Chile and purchased after the war began) to the aircraft carrier Eagle. The original armour was fitted between the main and upper decks, above the new armour. Additional high-tensile plating was added to the decks over the magazines. The ship's antitorpedo bulge was deepened and reworked along the lines of that installed on the battleship Ramillies. The bulge covered her hull from the submerged torpedo room to Y magazine, the inner compartments of which were filled with crushing tubes. The bulges added 12 feet 8 inches (3.9 m) to her beam and 1 foot 4 inches (0.4 m) to her draught. The refit added about 4,500 long tons (4,600 t) to her displacement and raised her metacentric height to 6.4 feet (2 m) at deep load. Three 30-foot (9.1 m) rangefinders were also added, as well as eight torpedo tubes in twin mounts on the upper deck. Both flying-off platforms were removed. This refit cost £860,684.

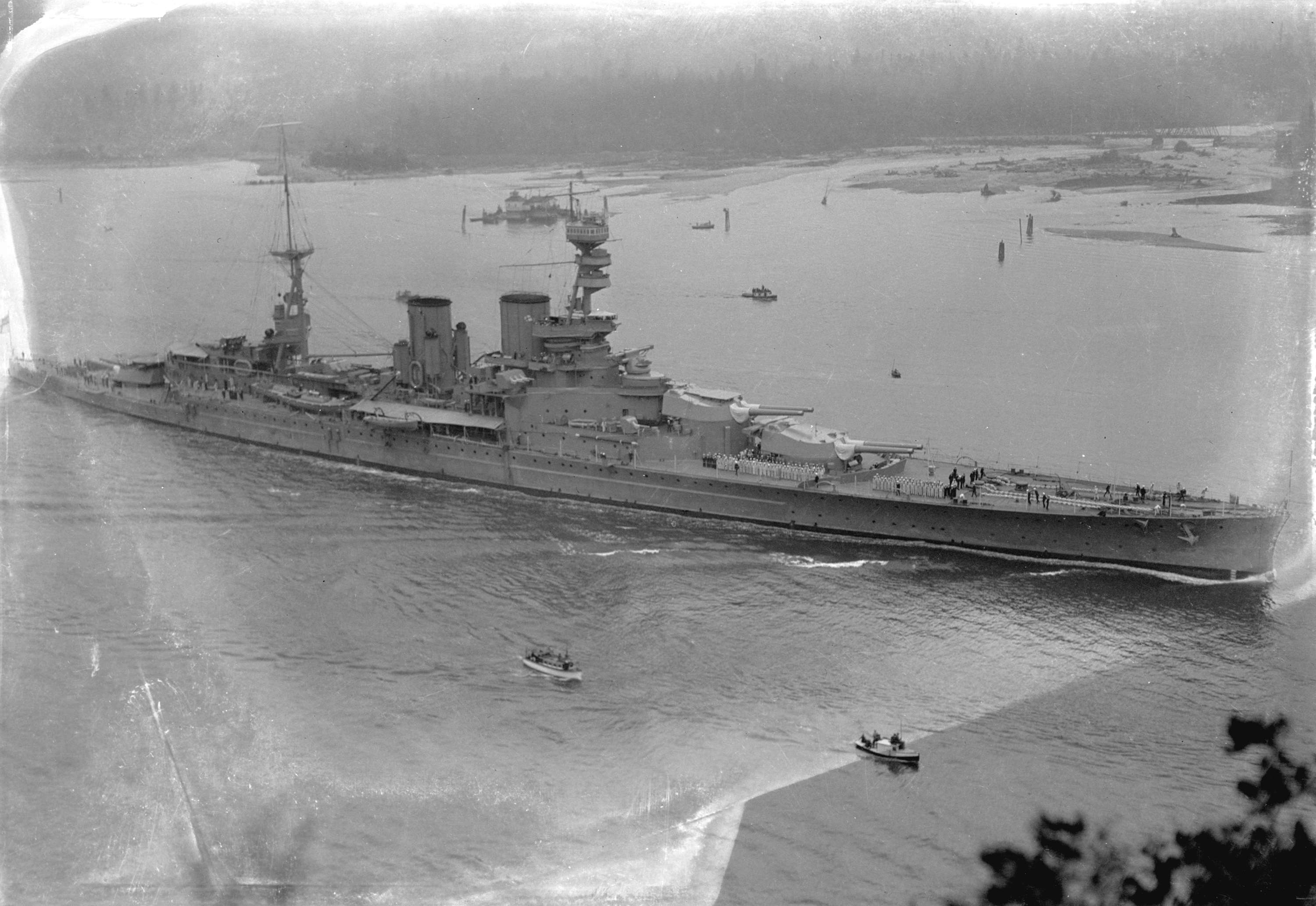
Repulse entering Vancouver Harbour during her world tour with Hood and other ships of the Special Service Squadron, 1924

Repulse was recommissioned on 1 January 1921 and joined the Battlecruiser Squadron of the Atlantic Fleet. In November 1923, Hood, accompanied by Repulse and a number of Danae-class cruisers of the 1st Light Cruiser Squadron, set out on a world cruise from west to east via the Panama Canal. They returned home 10 months later in September 1924. Shortly after her return, the ship's two 3-inch AA guns and her two single 4-inch gun mounts were removed and replaced with four QF 4-inch Mark V AA guns. The Battlecruiser Squadron visited Lisbon in February 1925 to participate in the Vasco da Gama celebrations before continuing on to the Mediterranean for exercises. A squash court was added on the starboard side between the funnels, as were a sauna and bubble bath on the quarterdeck for the Prince of Wales' tour of Africa and South America that lasted from March to October. Upon her return, she was refitted from November 1925 to July 1926 and had a high-angle control position added to her fore-top.

==== 1930s reconstructions ====
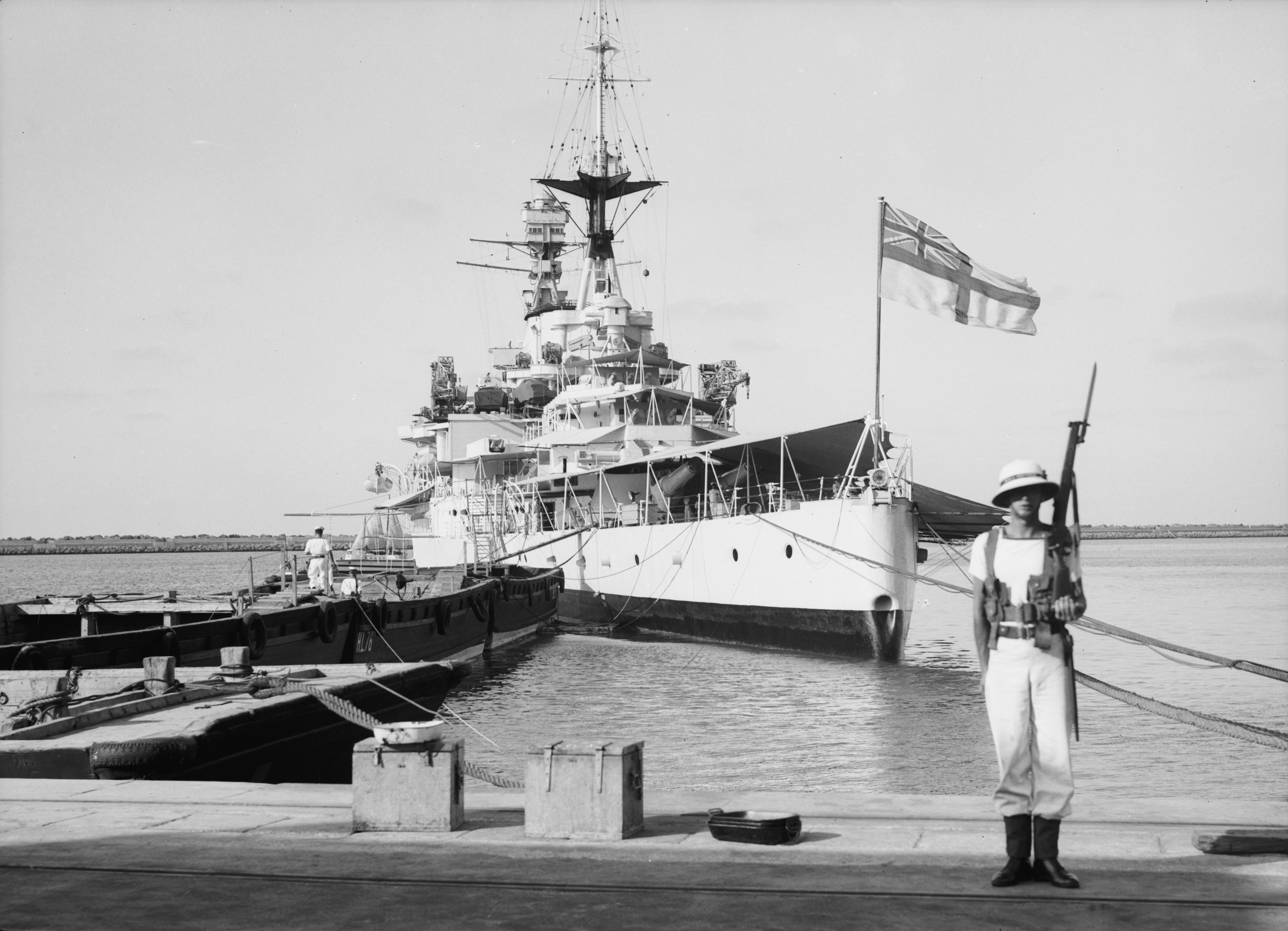
Repulse in July 1938, from the stern

After Repulse completed her 1926 refit, she remained in commission, aside from a brief refit from July to September 1927, with the Battlecruiser Squadron of the Atlantic Fleet until she was paid off in June 1932 prior to beginning her reconstruction in April 1933. Most of the existing layers of high-tensile steel that constituted the ship's horizontal armour were replaced by noncemented armour plates 2.5–3.5 inches (64–89 mm) in thickness, and the torpedo control tower was removed from the aft superstructure. A fixed catapult replaced the midships 4-inch triple mount and a hangar was built on each side of the rear funnel to house two of the ship's Fairey III aircraft. One additional aircraft could be carried on the deck and another on the catapult itself. Electric cranes were mounted above each hangar to handle the aircraft.

The four 4-inch AA guns were moved, one pair abreast the rear funnel at the level of the hangar roof and the other pair abreast the fore funnel on the forecastle deck. Four prototype QF 4-inch Mark XV dual-purpose guns were added in twin-gun Mark XVIII mounts abreast the mainmast. Two octuple Mark VI 2-pounder mounts were fitted on extensions of the conning-tower platform abreast the fore funnel. Above these, a pair of quadruple Mark II* mountings for the 0.5-inch Vickers Mark III machine gun were added. These mounts could depress to −10° and elevate to a maximum of 70°. The machine guns fired a 1.326-ounce (37.6 g) bullet at a muzzle velocity of 2,520 ft/s (770 m/s). This gave the gun a maximum range around 5,000 yd (4,600 m), although its effective range was only 800 yd (730 m) Repulse received two high-angle control aystem AA directors, one Mark II on the fore-top and a Mark I* mounted on a pedestal above the rear superstructure. The two submerged torpedo tubes were removed and the vacant spaces were subdivided and turned into storerooms.

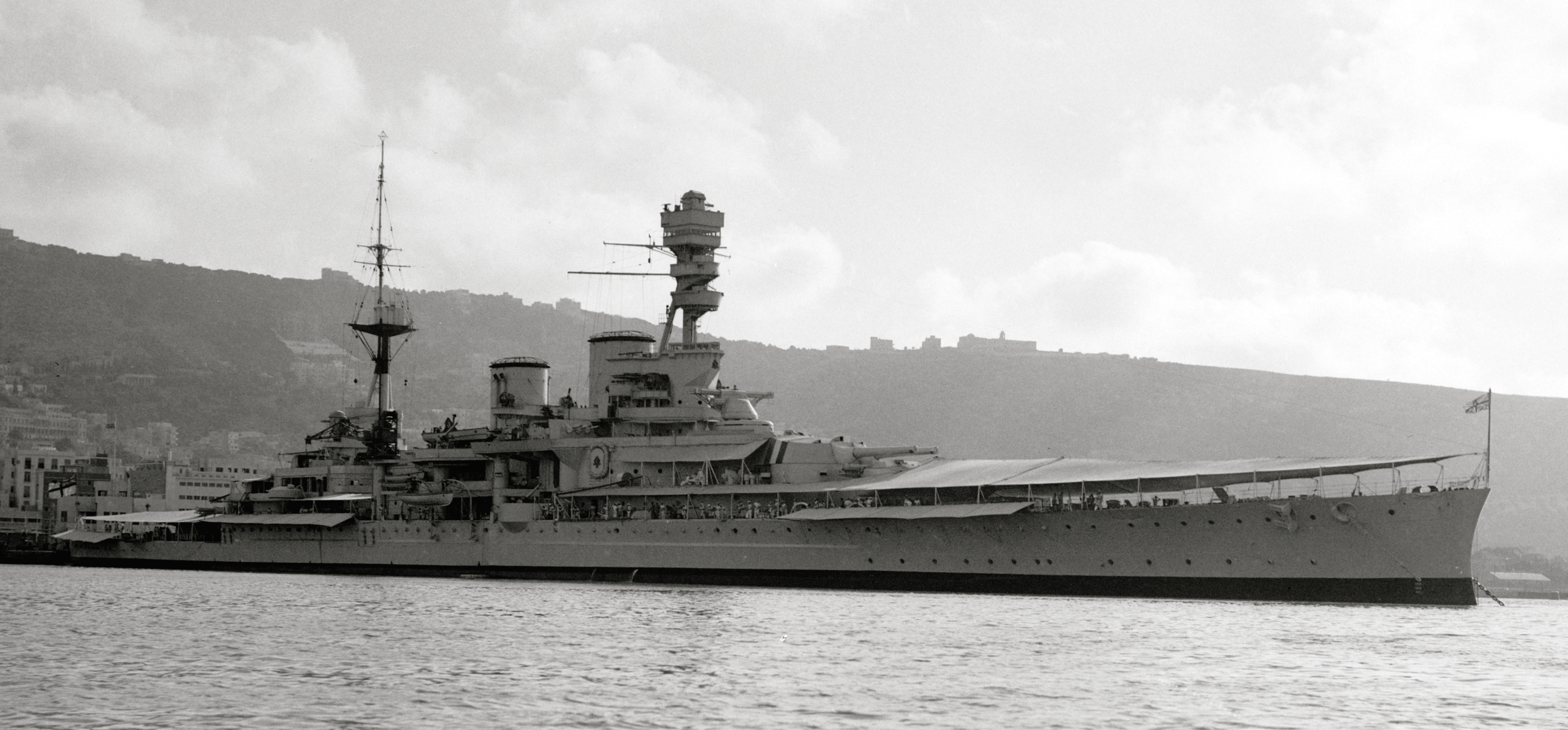
Repulse in Haifa harbor during the Arab Revolt, July 1938

Repulse was assigned to the Mediterranean Fleet when she recommissioned in April 1936. She transported 500 refugees from Valencia and Palma de Mallorca to Marseille, France, in late 1936 after the start of the Spanish Civil War. The ship was present at the Coronation Fleet Review at Spithead on 20 May 1937 for King George VI. Repulse was sent to Haifa in July 1938 to maintain order during the Arab Revolt. She was selected to convey the King and Queen during their May 1939 Canadian Tour, and she was refitted between October 1938 and March 1939 for this role. The twin 4-inch AA guns were replaced by two more Mark V guns and two additional quadruple .50-calibre mounts were added. The King and Queen ultimately travelled aboard the liner RMS Empress of Australia, while Repulse escorted them on the first half of the journey.

=== Second World War ===
At the beginning of the Second World War, Repulse was part of the Battlecruiser Squadron of the Home Fleet. She patrolled off the Norwegian coast and in the North Sea in search of German ships, as well as to enforce the blockade for the first few months of the war. Early in the war, the aft triple 4-inch gun mount was replaced with an 8-barrel 2-pounder mount. In late October, she was transferred to Halifax with the aircraft carrier Furious to protect convoys and search for German raiders. Repulse and Furious sortied from Halifax on 23 November in search of the German battleship Scharnhorst after she had sunk the armed merchant cruiser Rawalpindi, but Repulse was damaged by heavy seas in a storm and was forced to return to port. Repulse escorted the convoy bringing most of the 1st Canadian Infantry Division to Britain from 10 to 23 December 1939 and was reassigned to the Home Fleet. In February 1940, she accompanied the aircraft carrier Ark Royal on a fruitless search for six German blockade runners that had broken out of Vigo, Spain.

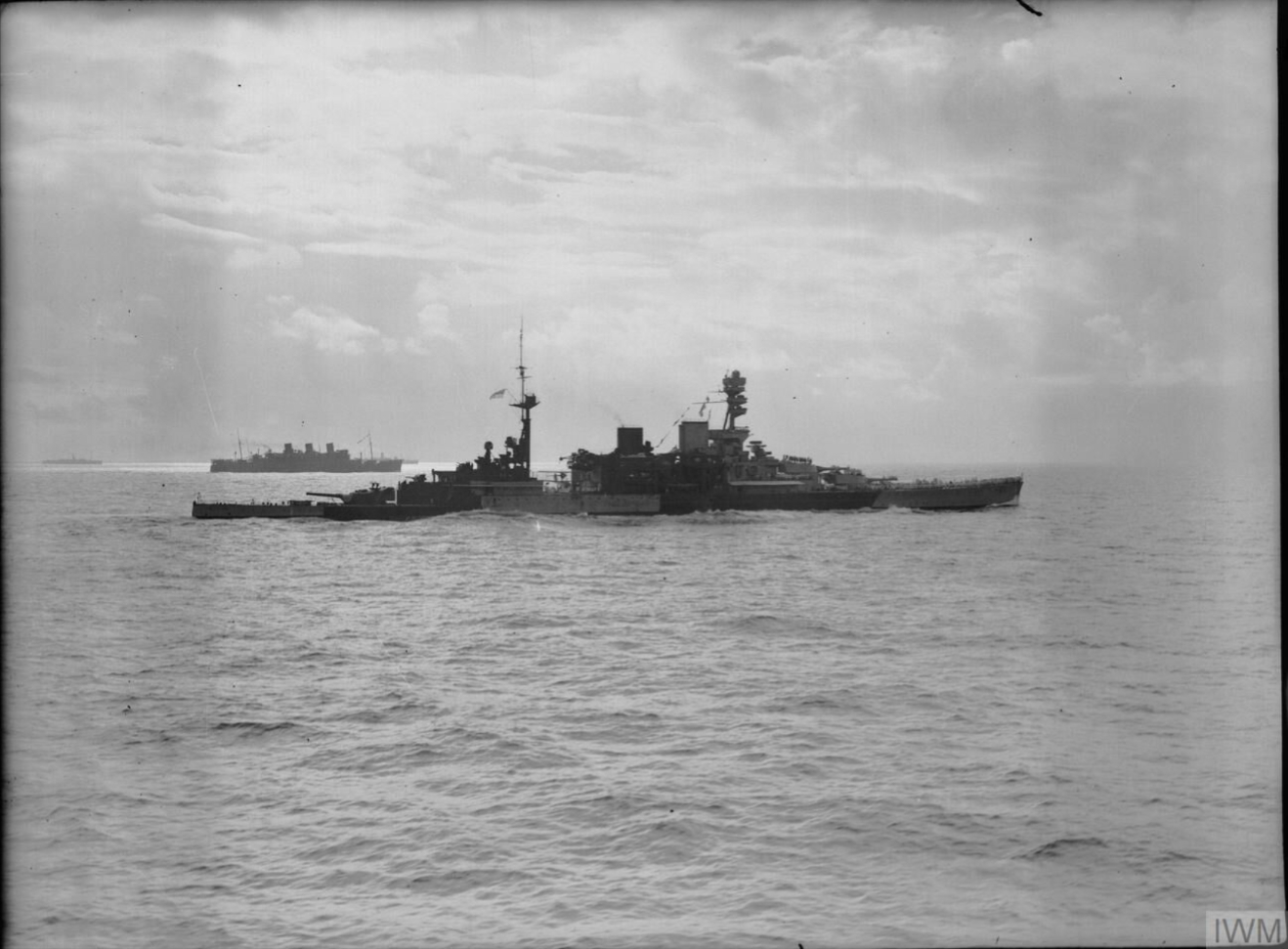
Repulse escorting the last convoy to reach Singapore, December 1941

Repulse was assigned to support Allied operations during the Norwegian Campaign in April–June 1940. On 7 April, Repulse, along with the bulk of the Home Fleet, was ordered to sea to intercept what was thought to be another German attempt to break out into the North Atlantic. The ship was detached the following day to search for a German ship reported by the destroyer Glowworm, but the destroyer had been sunk by the German cruiser Admiral Hipper before Repulse arrived, and she was ordered to meet with her sister Renown south of the Lofoten Islands, off the Norwegian coast. On 12 April, Repulse was ordered to return to Scapa Flow to refuel, and she escorted a troop convoy upon her return. In early June, the ship was sent to the North Atlantic to search for German raiders and played no part in the evacuation of Norway.

Accompanied by Renown and the 1st Cruiser Squadron, Repulse attempted to intercept the Gneisenau as she sailed from Trondheim to Germany in July. Until May 1941, the ship escorted convoys and unsuccessfully searched for German ships. On 22 May, Repulse was diverted from escorting Convoy WS8B to assist in the search for the Bismarck, but she had to break off the search early on 25 May, as she was running low on fuel. The ship was refitted from June–August and received six Oerlikon 20-millimetre (0.79 in) autocannons, as well as a Type 284 surface gunnery radar. Repulse escorted a troop convoy around the Cape of Good Hope from August to October and was transferred to East Indies Command.

==== Force Z ====
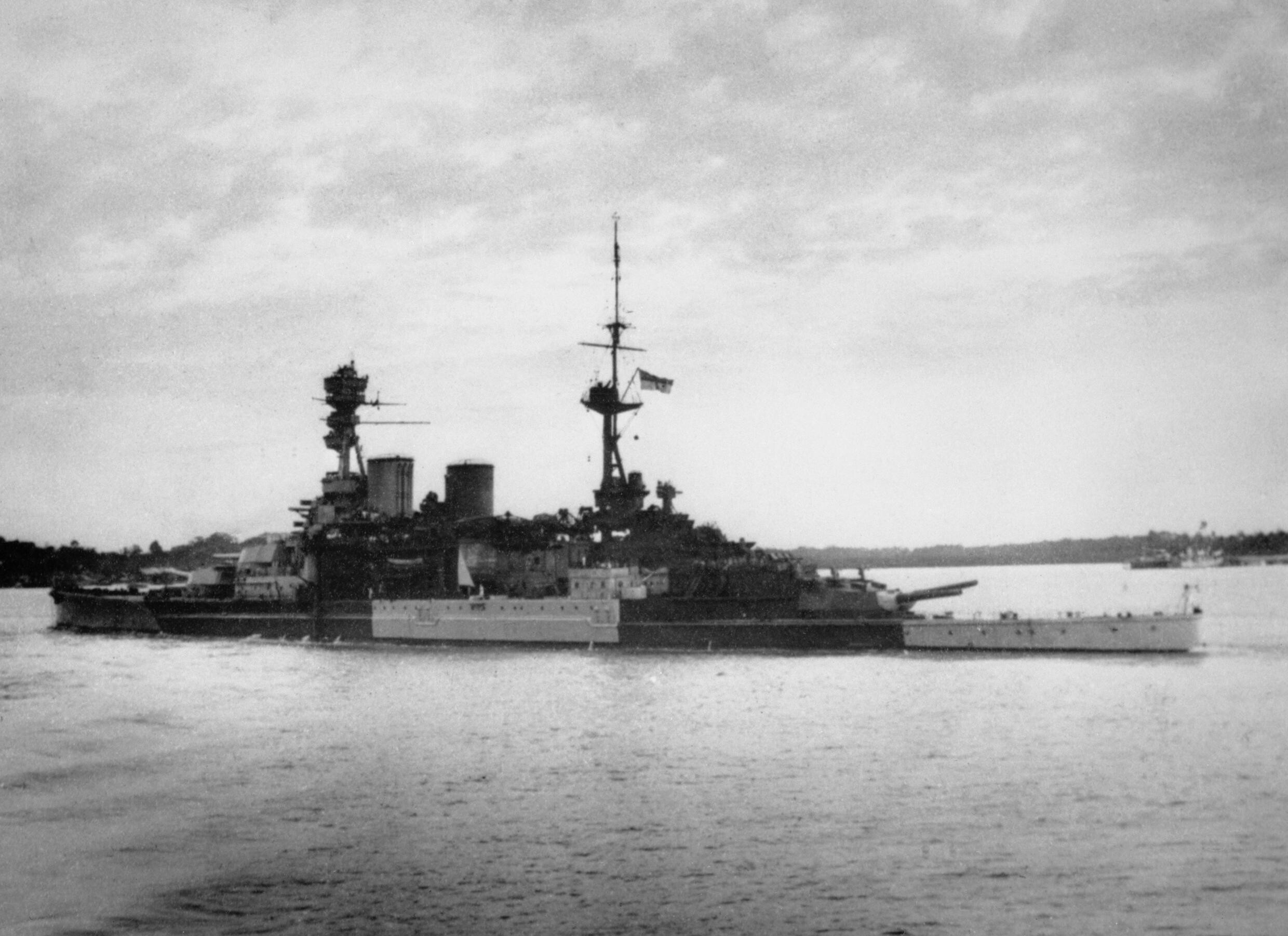
Repulse departing from Singapore on 8 December 1941

In late 1941, Winston Churchill decided to send a small group of fast capital ships along with one modern aircraft carrier to Singapore, to deter expected Japanese aggression. In November, Repulse, which was in the Indian Ocean, was ordered to Colombo, Ceylon, to meet with the new battleship Prince of Wales. The carrier Indomitable, which was assigned to join them, was delayed when she ran aground in the Caribbean. Prince of Wales, Repulse, and their escorting destroyers comprised Force Z, which arrived in Singapore on 2 December 1941. On the evening of 8 December, Force Z set out on an attempt to destroy Japanese troop convoys and protect the army's seaward flanks from Japanese landings in their rear.

Force Z was spotted during the afternoon of 9 December by the Japanese submarine I-65, and floatplanes from several Japanese cruisers spotted the British ships later that afternoon and shadowed them until dark. Admiral Sir Tom Phillips decided to cancel the operation, as the Japanese were now alerted. Force Z turned back during the evening, after having tried to deceive the Japanese that they were heading to Singora. At 00:50 on 10 December, Admiral Philips received a signal of enemy landings at Kuantan and correspondingly altered course so that he would arrive shortly after dawn.

The crew of I-58 spotted Force Z at 02:20, reported their position, and fired five torpedoes, all of which missed. Based on this report, the Japanese launched 11 reconnaissance aircraft before dawn to locate Force Z. Several hours later, 86 bombers from the 22nd Air Flotilla based in Saigon were launched, carrying bombs or torpedoes. The crew of a Mitsubishi G3M reconnaissance bomber spotted the British at 10:15 and radioed in several reports. The pilot was ordered to maintain contact and to broadcast a directional signal that the other Japanese bombers could follow.

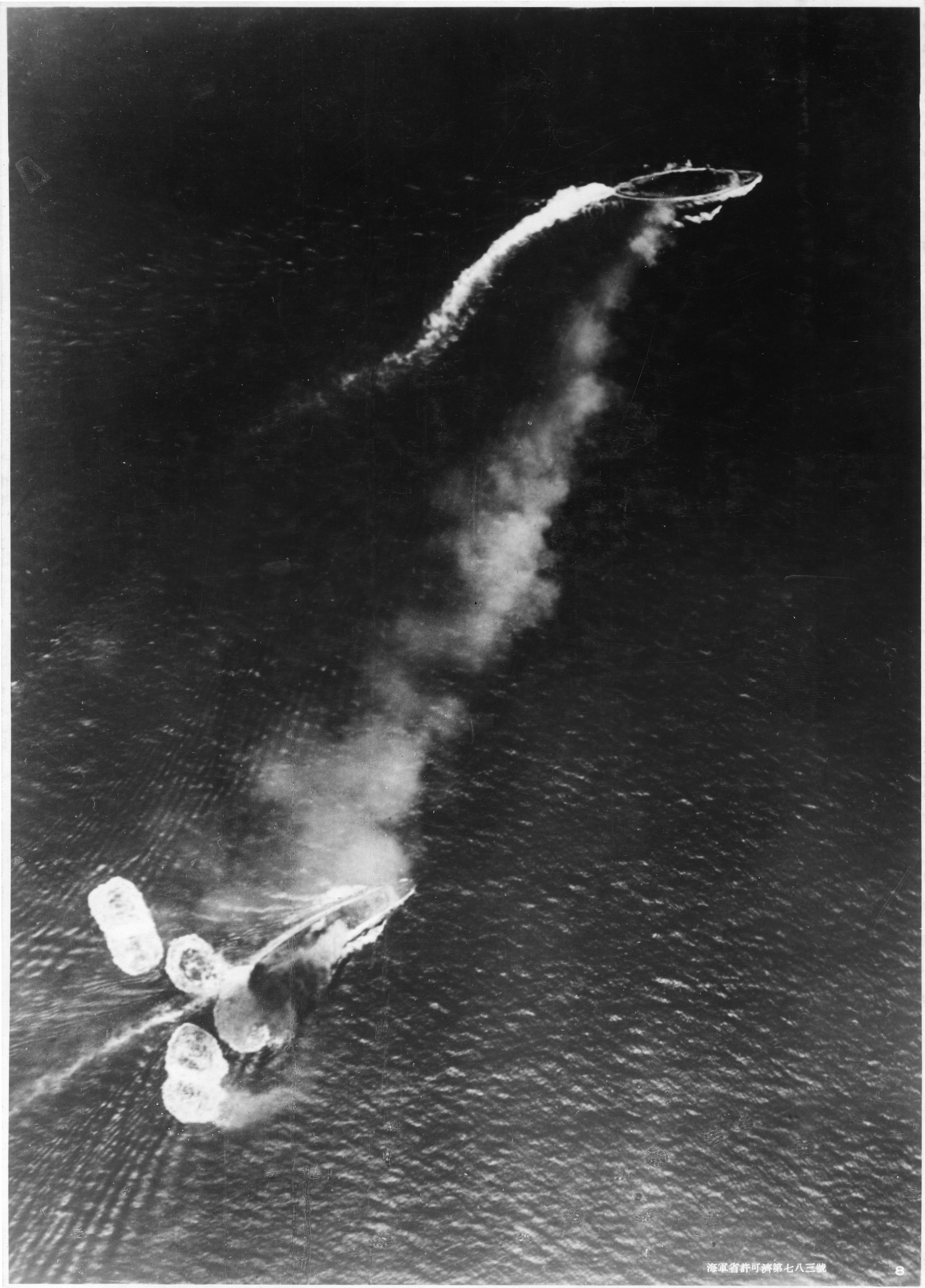
Repulse is at the bottom of the frame, having been hit by a bomb, 10 December 1941

The first attack began at 11:13, when eight G3Ms dropped 250 kg (550 lb) bombs from an altitude of 11,500 feet (3,510 m). The battlecruiser was straddled by two bombs, then hit by a third, which penetrated through the hangar to explode on the armoured deck below. This inflicted a number of casualties and damaged the ship's Supermarine Walrus seaplane, which was then pushed over the side to remove a fire hazard. Antiaircraft fire damaged five of the Japanese bombers, two so badly that they immediately returned to Saigon. In the ensuing attacks, Repulse was skilfully handled by her captain, Bill Tennant, who managed to avoid 19 torpedoes, as well as the remaining bombs from the G3Ms. The gunners on the Repulse shot down two planes and heavily damaged eight more. However, Repulse was then caught by a synchronised pincer attack by 17 Mitsubishi G4M torpedo bombers and hit by four or five torpedoes in rapid succession, which proved fatal. At 12:23, Repulse listed severely to port, quickly capsized, and went down by the stern with the loss of 508 officers and men out of 1,309. The destroyers Electra and Vampire rescued the survivors, including Captain Tennant.

== Wreck ==
HMS Repulse came to rest at 183 feet (56 m), almost upside down with her starboard side elevated and her port side buried in the seabed at 3°37′N 104°20′E. The wreck site was designated as a Protected Place in 2002 under the Protection of Military Remains Act 1986, 60 years after her sinking.

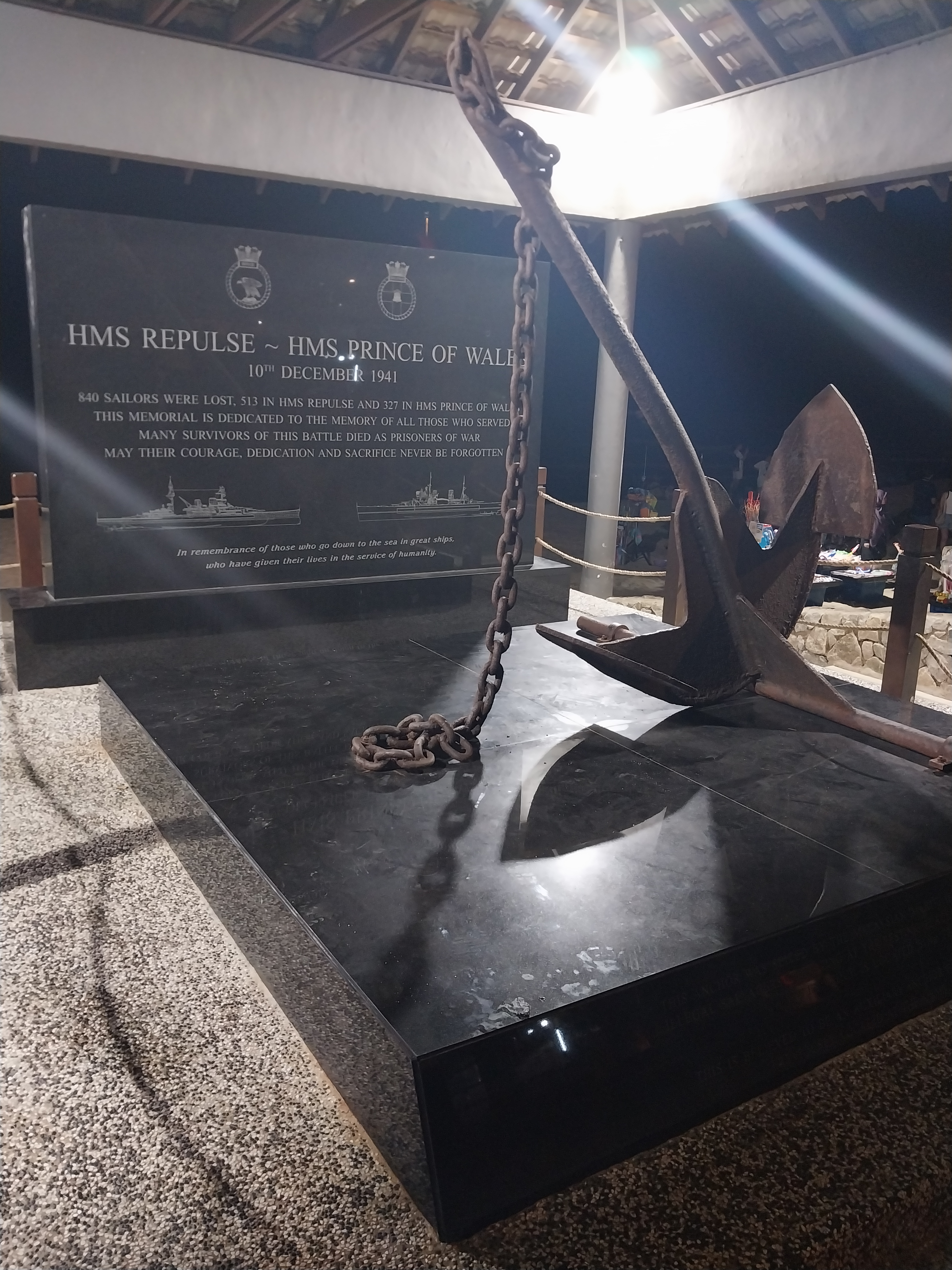
Memorial park of HMS Repulse and HMS Prince of Wales at Kuantan

Survivors described five torpedo hits on Repulse, four on the port side and one on the starboard. The four portside hits purportedly were two amidship, one abreast of the rear turret, and one near the propellers. The starboard side hit was amidships. A 2007 diving expedition could confirm only two of the hits by examination of the wreck, the portside hit near the propellers and the starboard hit amidship. Unfortunately at the time of the expedition, the portside midships section of the wreck was buried in the ocean floor, thus the claimed hits there could not be confirmed. However, the area abreast of the port rear turret was accessible and no sign whatsoever of a torpedo hit, as described by survivors, was found.

In October 2014, The Daily Telegraph reported that both Prince of Wales and Repulse were being "extensively damaged" with explosives by scrap-metal dealers. In May 2023, it was reported that a Chinese ship, Chuan Hong 68, illegally scavenged the wreck for its low-background steel. In July 2024, this same vessel, Chuan Hong 68, suspected of not only looting the wrecks of Force Z, but also other World War II wrecks in Asian waters, was back "working" in the region and was subsequently detained by Malaysian authorities for "paperwork violations".
