= Cross (disambiguation) =

A cross is a geometrical figure consisting of two intersecting lines or bars.

Cross or The Cross may also refer to:

== Religion ==
- Christian cross, the basic symbol of Christianity
- Cross necklace, a necklace worn by adherents of the Christian religion
- Scientology cross, a symbol of Scientology

== Business ==
- A. T. Cross Company, manufacturer of pens
- Cross (studio), a Japanese adult video producer
- The Cross (nightclub), a defunct nightclub in London, UK

== Entertainment ==
=== Films ===
- Cross, a 2009 film starring Bai Ling
- Cross (1987 film), a French crime film written and directed by Philippe Setbon
- Cross (2011 film), an action film
- Cross (2012 film), a crime thriller
- The Cross (2009 film), a documentary directed by Matthew Crouch

=== Music ===
- The Cross (band), a side project of Queen's Roger Taylor
- The Cross, a rock band fronted by actor Phil Daniels
- Cross (Justice album), 2007, stylized as †
- Cross (Sayuri Ishikawa album), 2012, stylized as X -Cross-
- Cross (Luna Sea album), 2019
- "Cross", a song by Band-Maid from Just Bring It
- "The Cross", song by Nas from God's Son (album)
- "The Cross", a song by Prince from Sign o' the Times

=== Other uses in entertainment ===
- Cross (manga), a 1997 manga series by Sumiko Amakawa
- Cross (South Korean TV series), 2018
- Alex Cross (novel series), by James Patterson
  - Cross (novel), 2006, in the series
  - Cross (American TV series), 2024, based on the novel series

== Mathematics ==
- Cross product, a binary operation on vectors in a three-dimensional Euclidean space
- Cross-ratio, an invariant under projective transformations
- Cross, a symbol in a system of symbolic logic developed by G. Spencer-Brown in his book Laws of Form
- Cross, the square of the cosine in Rational trigonometry

== Objects ==
- Cross (crown), the decoration located at the highest level of a crown
- X mark, a typographic mark that indicates negation, opposite to a check mark
- Cross (plumbing)

== People ==
- Cross (surname), people with the surname

=== Fictional characters ===
- Cross Marian, a fictional character in the manga D.Gray-man
- Cross, one of the main characters in the manga and anime Ginga: Nagareboshi Gin

== Places ==
=== Multiple countries ===
- Cross Island (disambiguation)
- Cross Lake (disambiguation)
- Cross River (disambiguation)

=== Australia ===
- Kings Cross, New South Wales, inner-city locality of Sydney, colloquially known as The Cross

=== United States ===
- Cross, South Carolina
- Cross, West Virginia
- Cross, Wisconsin
- Cross Seamount, Hawaii
- The Cross (Barre, Massachusetts), a geoglyph and park

=== England ===
- Cross, Croyde, North Devon
- Cross, Goodleigh, North Devon
- Cross, Shropshire, Shropshire on List of United Kingdom locations: Croe-Cros
- Cross, Somerset

=== Northern Ireland ===
- Cross, County Down, a townland in County Down
- Cross, County Antrim, a townland in County Antrim
- Cross, County Armagh, a townland in County Armagh
- Cross, County Fermanagh, a townland in County Fermanagh

=== Scotland ===
- Cross, Lewis

=== Republic of Ireland ===
- Cross, County Mayo
- Cross, County Clare
- Cross (parish), Catholic parish in County Clare

== Sports ==
- Cross (association football), a delivery of a ball from either side of the field across to the front of the goal
- Cross (boxing), a counter-punch used in boxing
- Snowboard cross or Boarder Cross, a snowboard competition
- Cyclo-cross, a race that involves cycling and running while carrying the bike, also called Cross
- Motocross
- Ski cross

== Other uses ==
- Centres régionaux opérationnels de surveillance et de sauvetage (CROSS)
- Cross, short for Crossover, a type of a sport utility vehicle built on a car platform
- Hybrid (biology) (or cross), two distinct genetic lines, one of the basic methods of experimental genetics
- Cross, a synonym for anger
- Cross-examination, the interrogation of a witness by one's opponent in court
- Cross FM, a radio station in Fukuoka Prefecture, Japan

== See also ==
- Crossbreed
- Crosse
- Crossroads (disambiguation)
- Crossed (disambiguation)
- Crosses (disambiguation)
- Crux (disambiguation)
- Dagger (mark) (†)
- Coloured crosses:
  - Blue Cross (disambiguation)
  - Bronze Cross (disambiguation)
  - Gold Cross (disambiguation)
  - Green Cross (disambiguation)
  - Red Cross (disambiguation)
  - Silver Cross (disambiguation)
  - White Cross (disambiguation)
  - Yellow Cross (disambiguation)
