= Black cross =

Black cross or Black Cross may refer to:

- Black Cross (Teutonic Order), heraldic insignia of the Teutonic order (since 1205)
- Black Cross (Germany), military emblem of Prussia and Germany, derived from the cross used by the Teutonic order
- Anarchist Black Cross, an anarchist support organization
- Black Cross Navigation and Trading Company, the successor of the Black Star Line
- "Black Cross (Hezekiah Jones)", a 1948 poem by Joseph Simon Newman, recorded by Lord Buckley and by Bob Dylan
- Black Cross, also known as Knights of the Teutonic Order, a 1960 film from Poland
- "Black Cross" (song), debut single of the band 45 Grave
- Kroaz Du, a Breton flag
- Black Cross (painting), a painting by Kazimir Malevich

== See also ==
- Blue Cross (disambiguation)
- Bronze Cross
- Green Cross
- Red Cross (disambiguation)
- Silver Cross
- White Cross (disambiguation)
- Yellow cross
