= Silver Cross =

Silver Cross may refer to:

- SA Police Silver Cross for Gallantry, a civil decoration of South Africa
- Silver Cross (Canada), a Canadian medal
- Silver Cross Field, a baseball field known by that name from 2002 to 2017
- Silver Cross (Philippines), a military decoration in the Philippines
- Silver Cross of Rhodesia, Rhodesia's second-highest military decoration for conspicuous gallantry
- Silver Cross (company), a British manufacturer of baby transport
- Silver Cross Tavern, a pub in London, England
- Silver Cross, Zilveren Kruis a Dutch health insurance company
- "Silver Cross", a song by Charli XCX from Charli

== See also ==
- Black cross (disambiguation)
- Blue Cross (disambiguation)
- Bronze Cross (disambiguation)
- Gold Cross (disambiguation)
- Green Cross (disambiguation)
- Red Cross (disambiguation)
- White Cross (disambiguation)
- Yellow cross (disambiguation)
