= Cross country =

Cross country, cross-country or CrossCountry may refer to:

== Places ==
- Cross Country, Baltimore, a neighborhood in northwest Baltimore, Maryland

== Media and entertainment ==
- Cross Country (Webb Pierce album)
- Cross Country (Breland album)
- Cross Country (band), a band formed in 1973
- Cross Country (1983 film), a 1983 drama film directed by Paul Lynch
- Cross-Country (2011 film), a 2011 short drama film directed by Maryna Vroda
- Cross-Country (G.I. Joe), a fictional character in the G.I. Joe universe
- Cross Country (novel), a 2008 novel by James Patterson
- Cross Country USA (1988), an edutainment videogame by Didatech
- Lawrence Jones Cross Country, a 2022-2023 U.S. television program
- Cross-Country : A Book of Australian Verse, a 1984 anthology of Australian poetry

== Sports ==
- Cross country running, a sport in which teams of runners compete to complete a course over open or rough terrain
- Cross-country cycling, the most common discipline of mountain biking
- Cross-country motorcycling, is a high-endurance off-road sport where riders compete on a marked course through natural terrain.
- Cross-country riding, one of the three phases of the equestrian sport of eventing
- Cross-country flying, a type of distance flying in an aircraft
- Cross-country jump, a parachute jump
- Cross-country skiing, a winter sport for skiing
- Off-trail hiking
- Fell running, the sport of running and racing, off-road, over upland country
- Orienteering, sports that requires navigational skills using a map and compass
- Trail running, a sport which consists of running and hiking over trails

== Transportation ==
- Cross Country (automobile), various station wagons made by Nash and American Motors
- Cross Country Route, a railway route in Great Britain
- CrossCountry, a train operating company in Great Britain
- Aeros Cross Country, an ultralight trike aircraft
- Virgin CrossCountry, a former train operating company in Great Britain
- Cross Country (Volvo), various station wagons made by Volvo

== See also ==
- Cross-border
- Off-roading, driving or riding a vehicle on unsurfaced roads or tracks
- Country (disambiguation)
- Cross (disambiguation)
- Cross County (disambiguation)
