= Green Cross =

Green Cross may refer to:

== Science ==
- Green Cross (chemical warfare), a group of World War I chemical warfare agents

== Businesses ==
- Green Cross (South Korea), a South Korean pharmaceutical company
- Green Cross (Japan), a Japanese pharmaceutical company

== Health and safety ==
- Green Cross Code, a traffic safety education program in the United Kingdom
- Green Cross Corps, an alternative name for the British Women's Reserve Ambulance Corps
- Green Cross flags, the industrial safety/health flags in Japan
- Green Cross for Safety Award from the National Safety Council
- Green Cross International, an environmental organization founded by Mikhail Gorbachev
- Green Cross (Venezuela), a Venezuelan paramedic group
- Cannabis dispensary, indicated sometimes by a green cross sign
- Pharmacy, indicated in some countries by a green cross sign

== Sports ==
- C.A. Green Cross, an Ecuadorian football (soccer) club
- Club de Deportes Green Cross (1916–1985), a former Chilean football (soccer) club

== See also ==
- Blue Cross (disambiguation)
- Bronze Cross (disambiguation)
- Gold Cross (disambiguation)
- Red Cross (disambiguation)
- Silver Cross (disambiguation)
- White Cross (disambiguation)
- Yellow cross (disambiguation)
