= The Crossing =

The Crossing may refer to:

== Books ==
- The Crossing (play), a 2006 play by Zimbabwean playwright Jonathan Nkala
- The Crossing (Cardoso memoir), a 2000 memoir by East Timorese writer Luís Cardoso
- The Crossing (Churchill novel), a 1904 historical novel by American writer Winston Churchill
- The Crossing (Connelly novel), a 2015 novel by Michael Connelly
- The Crossing (McCarthy novel), a 1994 novel by American author Cormac McCarthy
- The Crossing (Murphy book), a 2010 history book by American author Jim Murphy
- The Crossing (Miller novel), a 2015 novel by English novelist Andrew Miller
- The Crossing, a 1987 novel by Ted Allbeury
- The Crossing, a 1971 novel by Howard Fast
- The Crossing, a 1958 novel by Clay Fisher
- The Crossing, a 1983 novel by Jim Flanagan, basis for the 1989 TV film The Haunting of Sarah Hardy
- The Crossing, a 2022 novel by Kevin Ikenberry set in the Assiti Shards series shared universe
- The Crossing, a 1987 novel by Gary Paulsen

== Film and television ==
- The Crossing (1990 film), a film starring Russell Crowe and Danielle Spencer
- The Crossing (2000 film), a 2000 A&E film based on the novel of the same name by Howard Fast starring Jeff Daniels as George Washington
- The Crossing (2010 film), a 2010 Turkish film
- The Crossing (2014 film), 2014 Chinese film directed by John Woo
- The Crossing (2018 film), Chinese film which received nominations at the 13th Asian Film Awards (Chinese Wikipedia: 过春天)
- The Crossing (2020 film), 2020 Colombian documentary film
- The Crossing (TV series), a 2018 American science fiction TV series
- "The Crossing" (Person of Interest), an episode of the TV series Person of Interest
- "The Crossing" (Star Trek: Enterprise), a 2003 episode of the television series Star Trek: Enterprise
- "The Crossing" (The Twilight Zone), an episode of the 1985-1989 television series The Twilight Zone
- "The Crossing" (Star Wars: The Bad Batch)

== Music ==
- The Crossing (choral ensemble), a professional choral ensemble directed by Donald Nally
- The Crossing (band), a Celtic band from Chicago
- The Crossing (Big Country album), a 1983 album and the title song
- The Crossing (Paul Young album), a 1993 album by Paul Young
- The Crossing (Sanjay Mishra album), a 1991 album by Sanjay Mishra
- The Crossing (Dave Brubeck album), a 2001 album by Dave Brubeck
- The Crossing (Sophie B. Hawkins album), a 2012 album by Sophie B. Hawkins
- The Crossing (Menahan Street Band album), a 2012 album by Menahan Street Band
- The Crossing (Joker Xue album), a 2017 album by Joker Xue
- The Crossing (Alejandro Escovedo album), a 2018 album by Alejandro Escovedo

== Other uses ==
- The Crossing (video game), a first person shooter computer game by Arkane Studios
- The Crossing Church, a megachurch in Quincy, Illinois
- The west to east crossing of the Suez Canal by the Egyptian army at the start of the Yom Kippur War in 1973, known as Operation Badr

== See also ==
- Cross (disambiguation)
- Crossing (disambiguation)
- Crossings (disambiguation)
