= Red Cross (disambiguation) =

The name Red Cross generally refers to the humanitarian movement, the International Red Cross and Red Crescent Movement, which is composed of:

- International Committee of the Red Cross
- International Federation of Red Cross and Red Crescent Societies
- List of Red Cross and Red Crescent Societies, national societies that belong to the Movement
  - American Red Cross, the national society in the United States, founded in 1881
  - British Red Cross, the national society in the United Kingdom, founded in 1870
- Emblems of the International Red Cross and Red Crescent Movement

The name may also refer to:

- Anarchist Black Cross, which was originally called the "Anarchist Red Cross"
- Red Cross (album), the last album by John Fahey
- Red Cross (band), an American rock band which changed its name to Redd Kross
- Red Cross (EP), the debut release by the American rock band Redd Kross
- Royal Red Cross, a military decoration awarded in the United Kingdom for exceptional services in military nursing
- Red Cross (order), either of two different masonic orders whose full names are thus abbreviated
- Red Cross (play), a 1966 play by Sam Shepard
- Red Cross, North Carolina
- Crveni Krst concentration camp, sometimes translated as Red Cross camp
- Red Cross Medal (Prussia), awarded for services to the sick
- Decoration for Services to the Red Cross, an award of the Austro-Hungarian Empire
- Redcross, Ireland

== See also ==
- Blue Cross (disambiguation)
- Bronze Cross (disambiguation)
- Gold Cross (disambiguation)
- Green Cross (disambiguation)
- Silver Cross (disambiguation)
- White Cross (disambiguation)
- Yellow Cross (disambiguation)
- Crveni Krst (disambiguation) ("Red Cross")
