= Agustín Téllez Cruces =

Mexican politician (1918–2024)

Personal details
- Born: 15 November 1918 Guanajuato, Guanajuato, Mexico
- Died: 11 January 2024 (aged 105)
- Party: PRI
- Profession: Lawyer

Agustín Téllez Cruces (Note: In this Mexican name, the surname is Téllez and the second or maternal family name is Cruces.) (15 November 1918 – 11 January 2024) was a Mexican lawyer and politician. He was governor of Guanajuato from 1984 to 1985 after having served as a justice and president of the Supreme Court of Justice of the Nation. He was also a member of the Senate for Guanajuato in 1982–1984.

Téllez Cruces died on 11 January 2024, at the age of 105.
