= Crosses =

Crosses may refer to:

- The plural noun form of Cross (disambiguation)
- The third-person singular verb form of Crossing (disambiguation)
- List of crosses (disambiguation)

== Arts ==
=== Music ===
- Crosses (band), a musical project featuring members of Deftones and Far
  - Crosses (Crosses album) (2014)
- Crosses (EP) (2003), by Jose Gonzalez, Swedish indie folk musician
- Crosses (Zornik album), 2007 album by Belgian rock band Zornik
- "Crosses", a track on 2003 José González album Veneer
- "Crosses" (song), a single by ASG

=== Other arts ===
- Crosses (Warhol), a 1981–1982 series of artworks by Andy Warhol

== Places ==
- Crosses, Cher, central France, a municipality
- Crosses, Arkansas, United States, a small community in the Ozarks

== Other uses ==
- Crosses, a truce term used in East Anglia and Lincolnshire, England

== See also ==
- Crosse, a surname
- - Crosses for Losses, an American organization founded by Greg Zanis to support victims of mass shootings and natural disasters
