= Crosse =

Crosse is a surname, and may refer to:

- Andrew Crosse (1784–1855), British amateur scientist
- Charles Crosse, British rugby
- Charles G. Crosse, American physician and politician
- Edmond Francis Crosse (1858–1941), first Archdeacon of Chesterfield
- John Crosse (announcer) (born 1939), English radio DJ, presenter and continuity announcer
- John Crosse (antiquary) (1786–1833), British antiquary and music writer
- John Green Crosse (1790–1850), English surgeon
- Joseph Charles Hippolyte Crosse (1826–1898), a French conchologist
- Lavinia Crosse, founder of the Community of All Hallows religious order
- Roger Crosse, character in James Clavell's novel Noble House
- Rupert Crosse (1927–1973), American television and film actor
- Victoria Crosse, a pseudonym of novelist Annie Sophie Cory (1868–1952)

== See also ==
- Crosse Baronets, title in the Baronetage of Great Britain
- Lacrosse stick, sometimes known as a crosse
- Cross (surname)
- Cross (disambiguation)
- Crosses (disambiguation)
