= Crossed out =

Crossed out may refer to:

- Strikethrough, lines or crosses drawn over text ~~like this~~ or ~~n~~
- Crossed Out, a band
- Crossed Out (album), a 1992 EP by eponymous band Crossed Out
- Crossed Out (song), a 2024 song by Future off the album We Still Don't Trust You

== See also ==
- X'ed Out, 2013 album by Tera Melos
- X-Out (disambiguation)
- Crossed (disambiguation)
- Cross (disambiguation)
- Out (disambiguation)
