= Crossings =

Crossings may refer to:

- Crossings (Buffy novel), a 2002 original novel based on the U.S. television series Buffy the Vampire Slayer
- Crossings (game), a two-player abstract strategy board game invented by Robert Abbott
- Crossings (Herbie Hancock album), 1972
- Crossings (journal), an academic journal on art
- Crossings (Red Garland album), 1978
- Crossings (Steel novel), a 1982 novel by Danielle Steel
- "Crossings" (Task), the first episode of the 2025 HBO series Task
- Crossings (Tony Rice album), 1994
- Crossings (miniseries), a 1986 miniseries directed by Karen Arthur, starring Cheryl Ladd and Lee Horsley and
- Crossings (TV series), a Malaysian dark comedy drama series
- Pedestrian crossing, a designated point on a road at which some means are employed to assist pedestrians wishing to cross
- Zebra crossing, also known as a crosswalk

== See also ==
- Crossing (disambiguation)
- The Crossing (disambiguation)
