= Crossing =

Crossing may refer to:

- Crossing (2008 film), a South Korean film
- Crossing (2024 film), an internationally co-produced film
- Crossing (2026 film), a Chinese war film
- Crossing (album), a 1985 album by world music/jazz group Oregon
- The Crossing (Joker Xue album), a 2017 album by Chinese artist Joker Xue
- Crossing (architecture), the junction of the four arms of a cruciform church
- Crossing (knot theory), a visualization of intersections in mathematical knots
- Crossing (physics), the relation between particle and antiparticle scattering
- Crossing (plant), deliberate interbreeding of plants
- Crossing (opera), an opera composed by Matthew Aucoin
- Crossing oneself, a ritual hand motion made by some Christians
- William Crossing (1847–1928), English writer
- Crossing (sculpture), a sculpture by Hubertus Von Der Goltz

== Transportation ==
- Intersection (road), also known as a crossing
- Level crossing or grade crossing, a railway crossing a street or path at the same level
- Common crossing or frog, a component of a railway switch
- Level junction, or flat crossing, an intersection between two railway lines at the same level
- Pedestrian crossing, a designated crossing for pedestrians to use
- Zebra crossing, a type of crossing where pedestrians have priority over road users

== See also ==
- Crossings (disambiguation)
- The Crossing (disambiguation)
- Cross (disambiguation)
