= Volvo XC =

Name prefix

Volvo XC is a name prefix/suffix that has been applied to multiple crossovers/SUVs by Volvo. 'XC' is an abbreviation for Cross Country with the X representing 'Cross' and the C abbreviating 'Country.'

Vehicles that have used or are currently using the nameplate are:

== Production ==
- Volvo XC40 (2017–present)
  - Volvo XC40 Recharge (2020–present)
- Volvo XC60
  - Volvo XC60 (2008–2017)
  - Volvo XC60 (2017–present)
- Volvo V70 XC/XC70 (1998–2003 (V70 XC)), (2003–2016 (XC70))
  - Volvo V70 XC (1998–2000)
  - Volvo V70 XC (2000–2003)
  - Volvo XC70 (2003–2008)
  - Volvo XC70 (2008–2016)
- Volvo XC70 (2025)
- Volvo XC90
  - Volvo XC90 (2002–2014)
  - Volvo XC Classic (2014–2016)
  - Volvo XC90 (2014–present)

=== Gallery ===
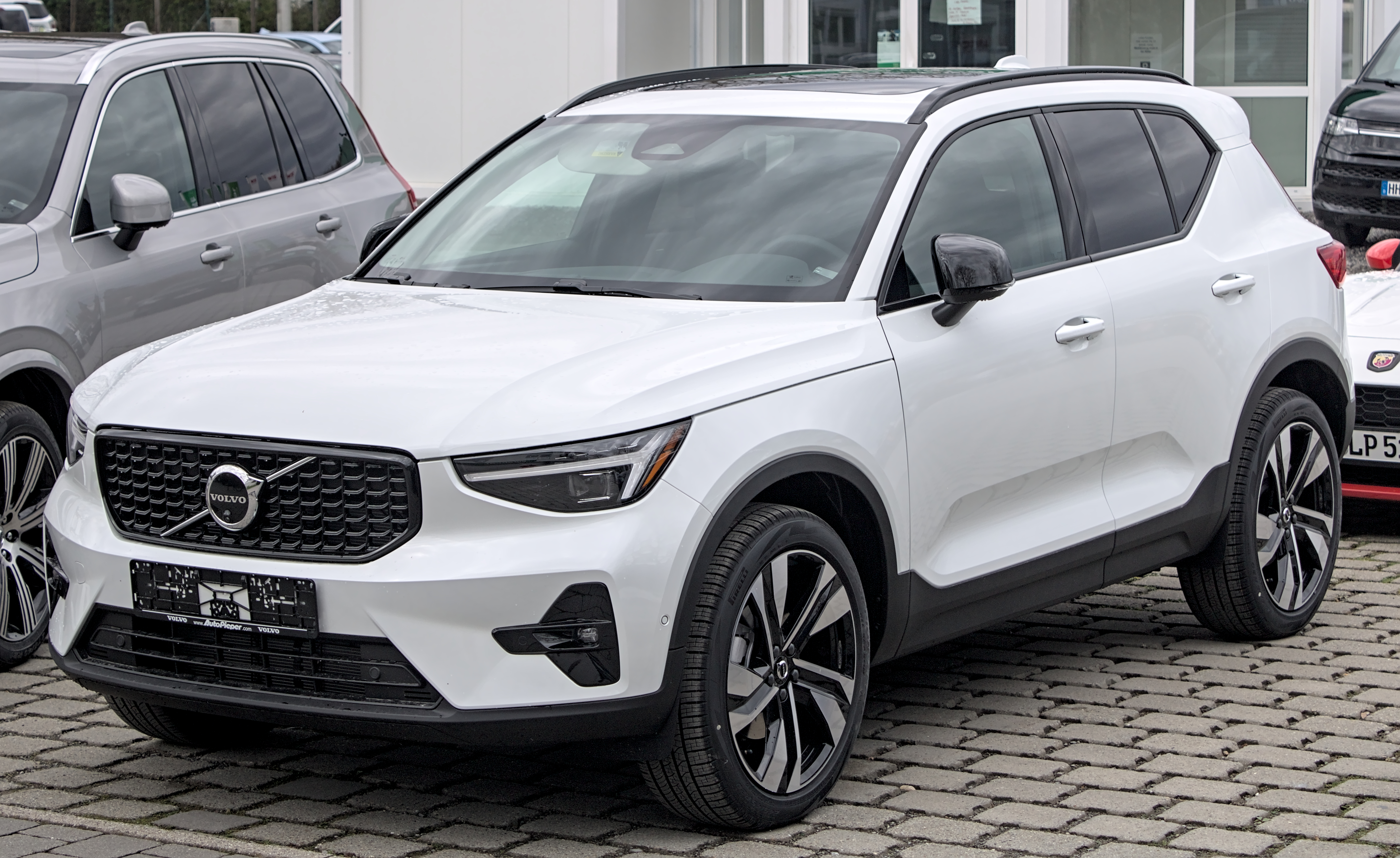
2017–present Volvo XC40

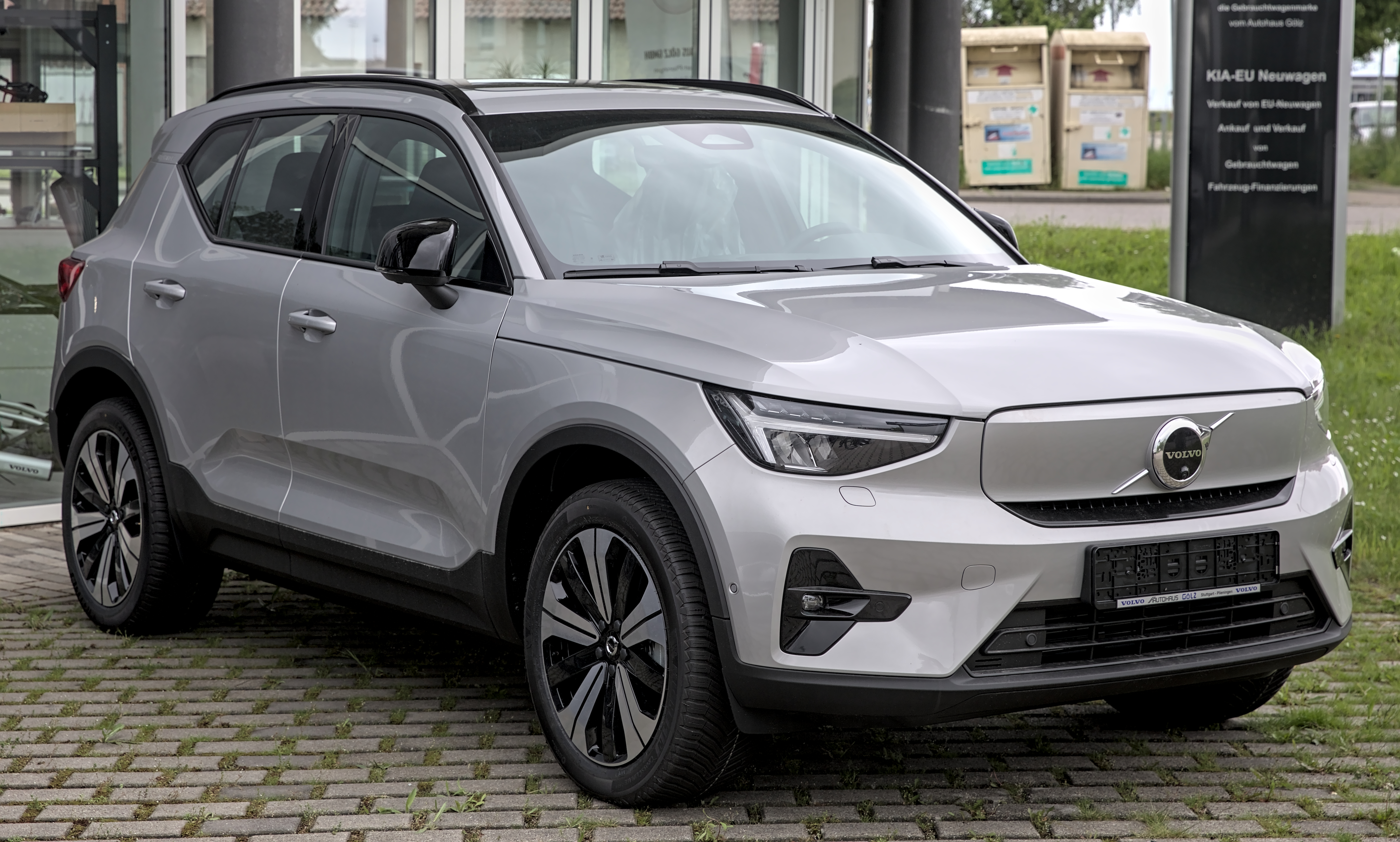
2020–present Volvo XC40 Recharge

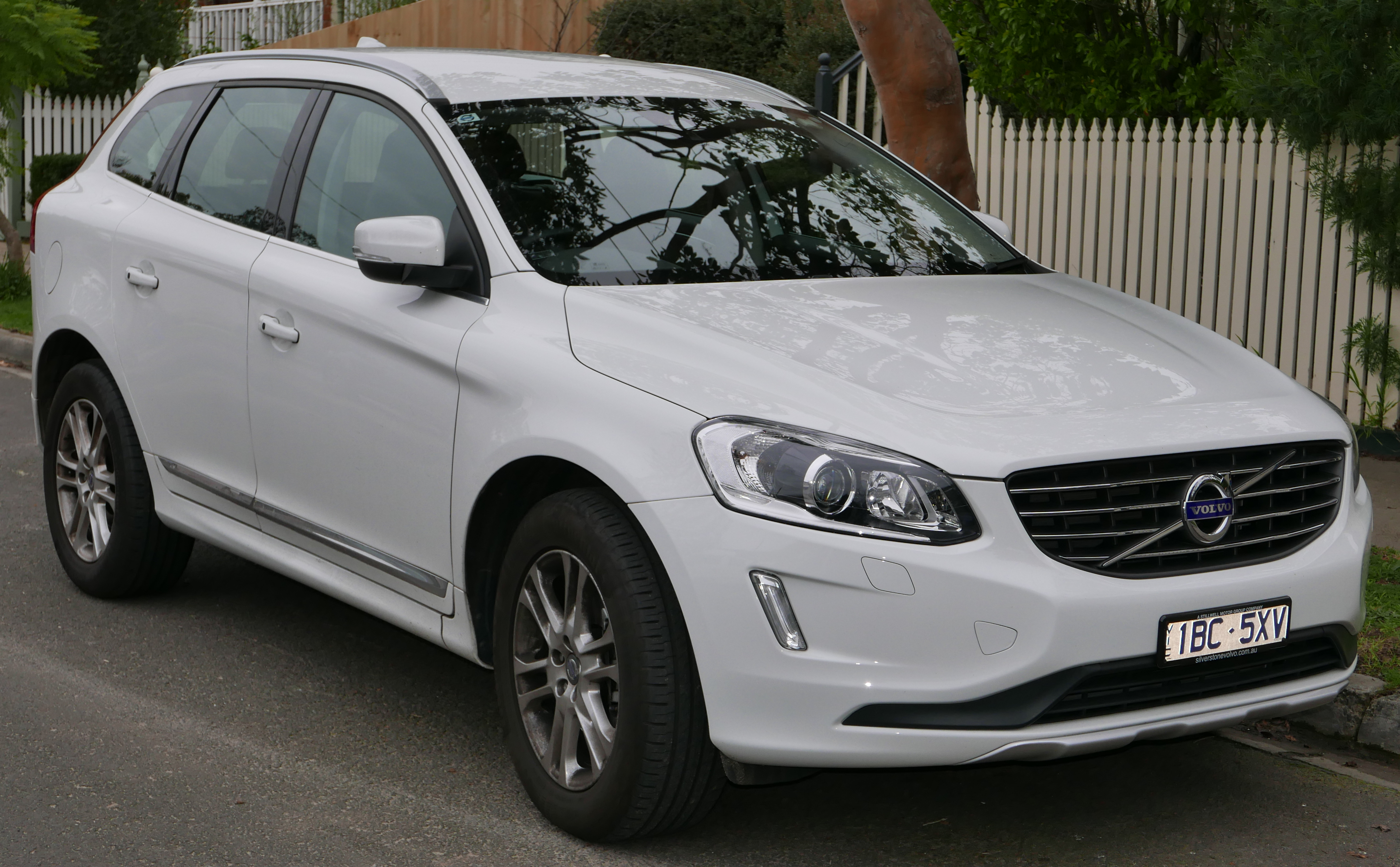
2009–2017 Volvo XC60

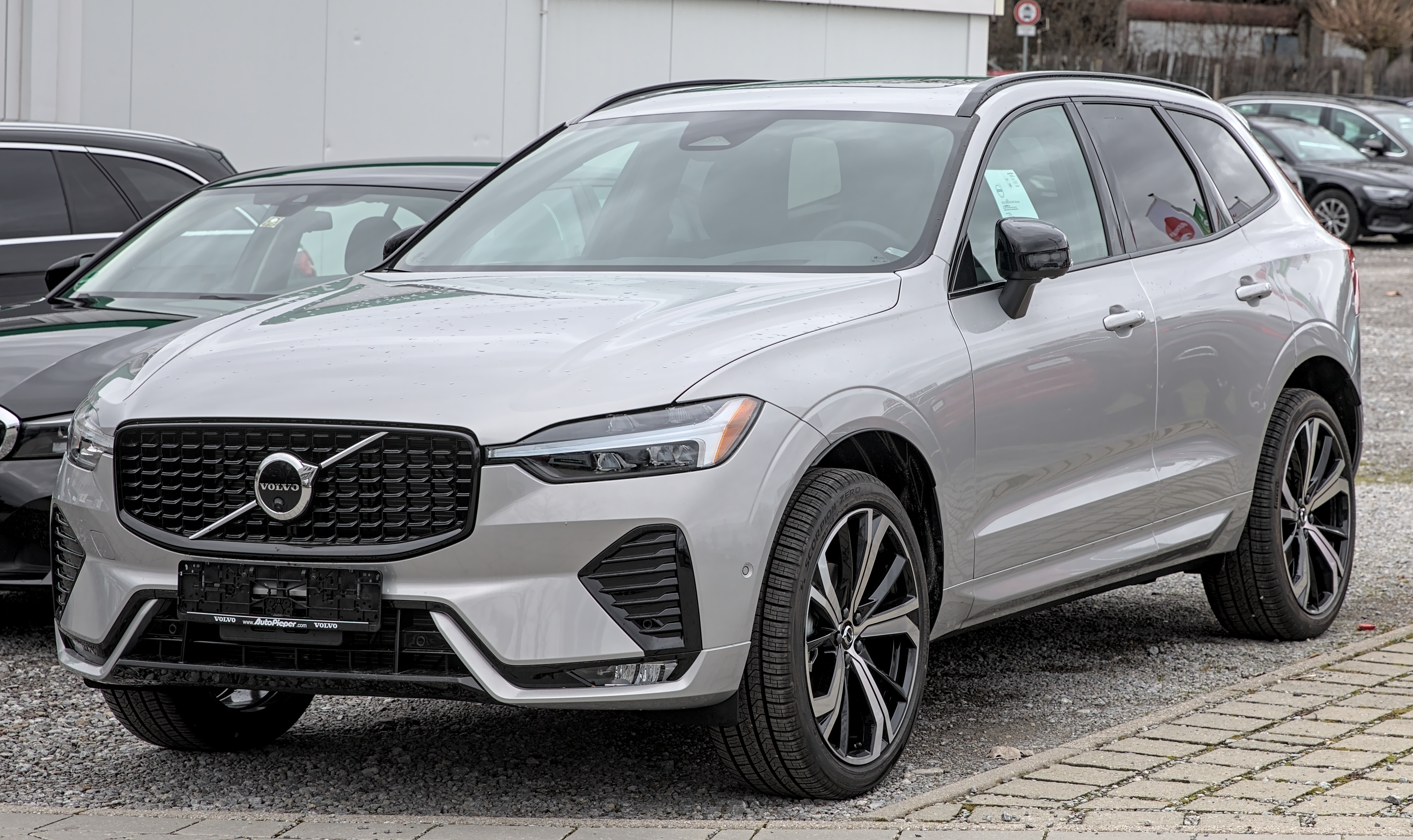
2018–present Volvo XC60

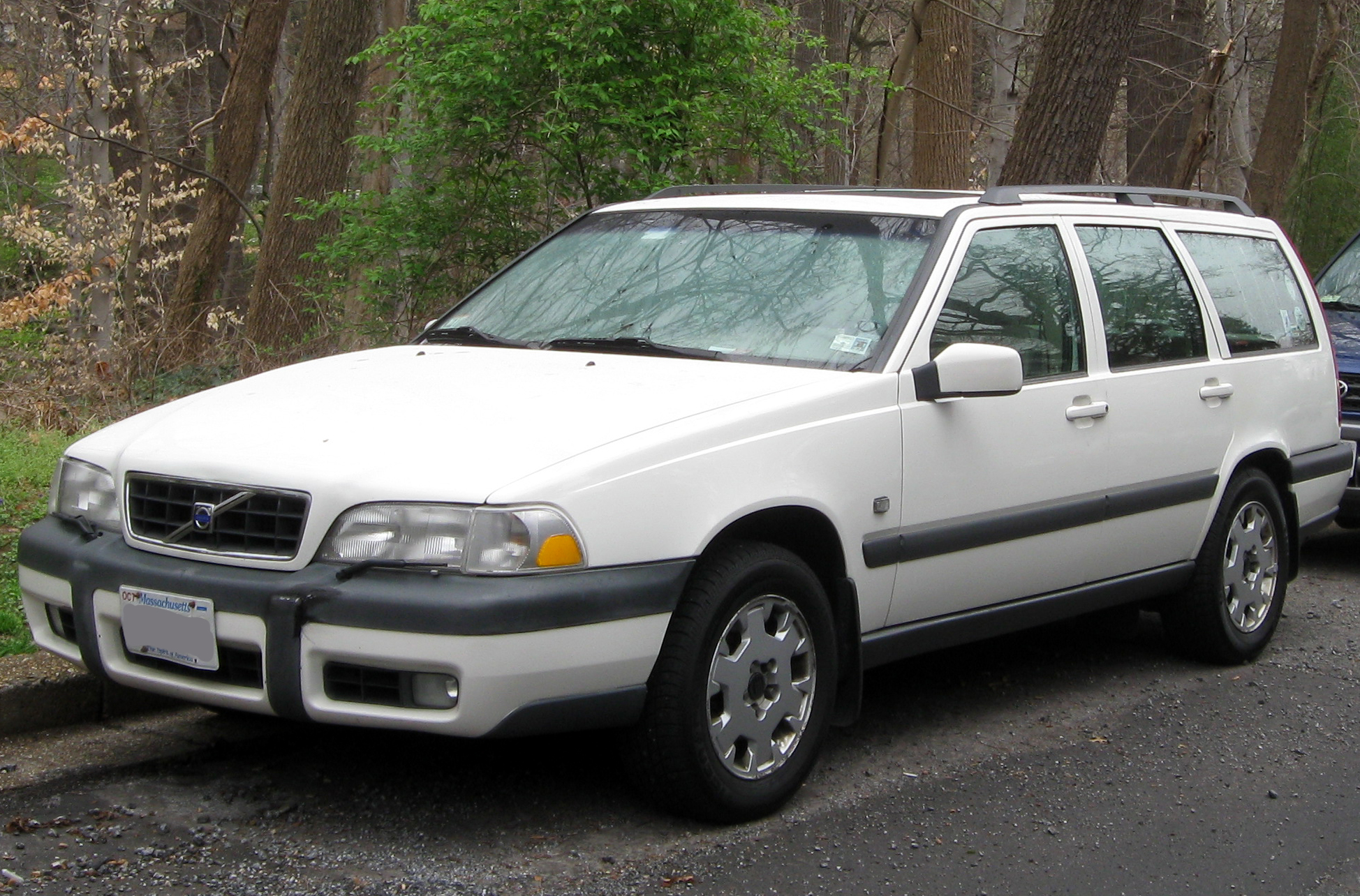
1998–2000 Volvo V70 XC

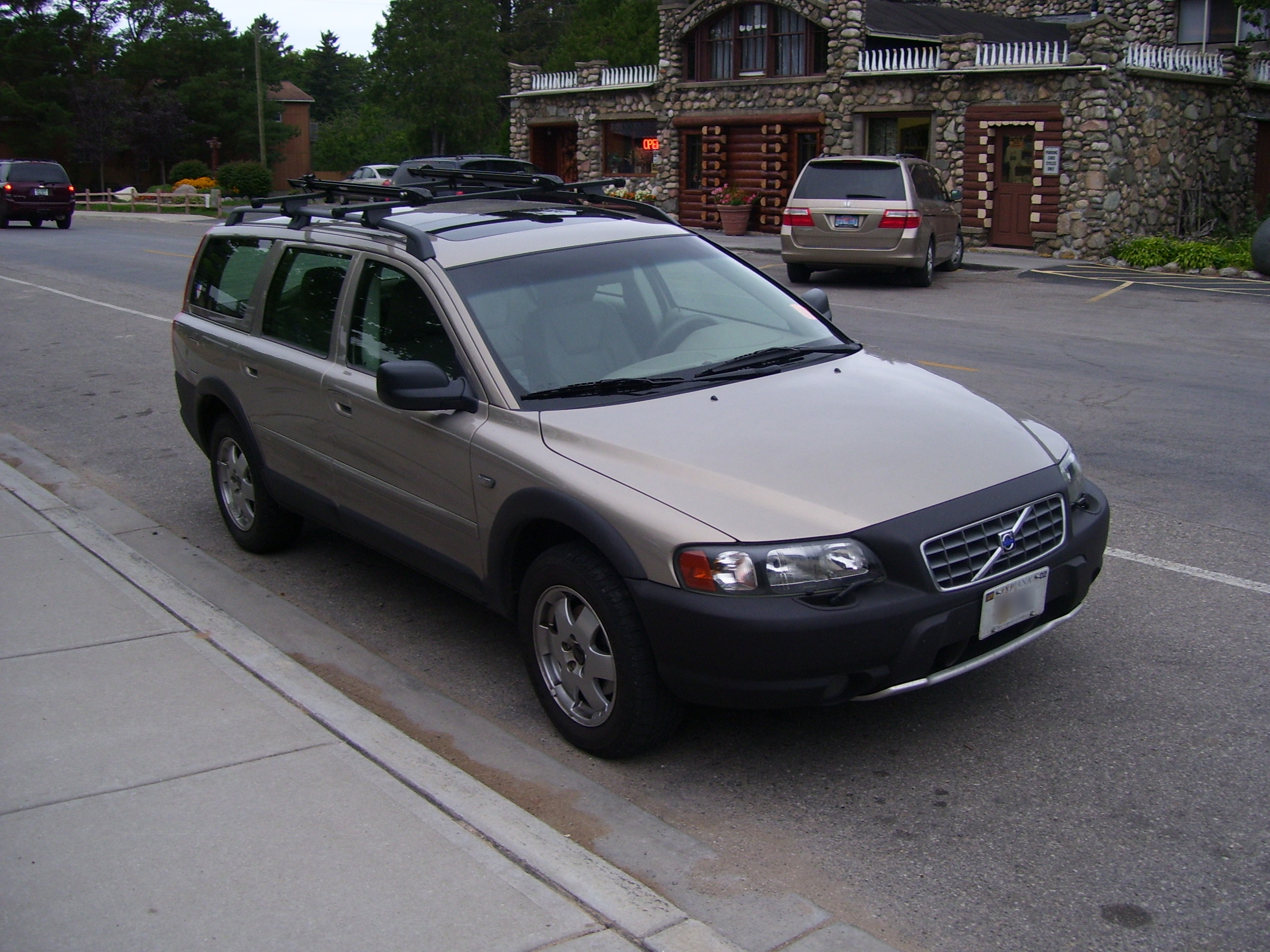
2000–2003 Volvo V70 XC

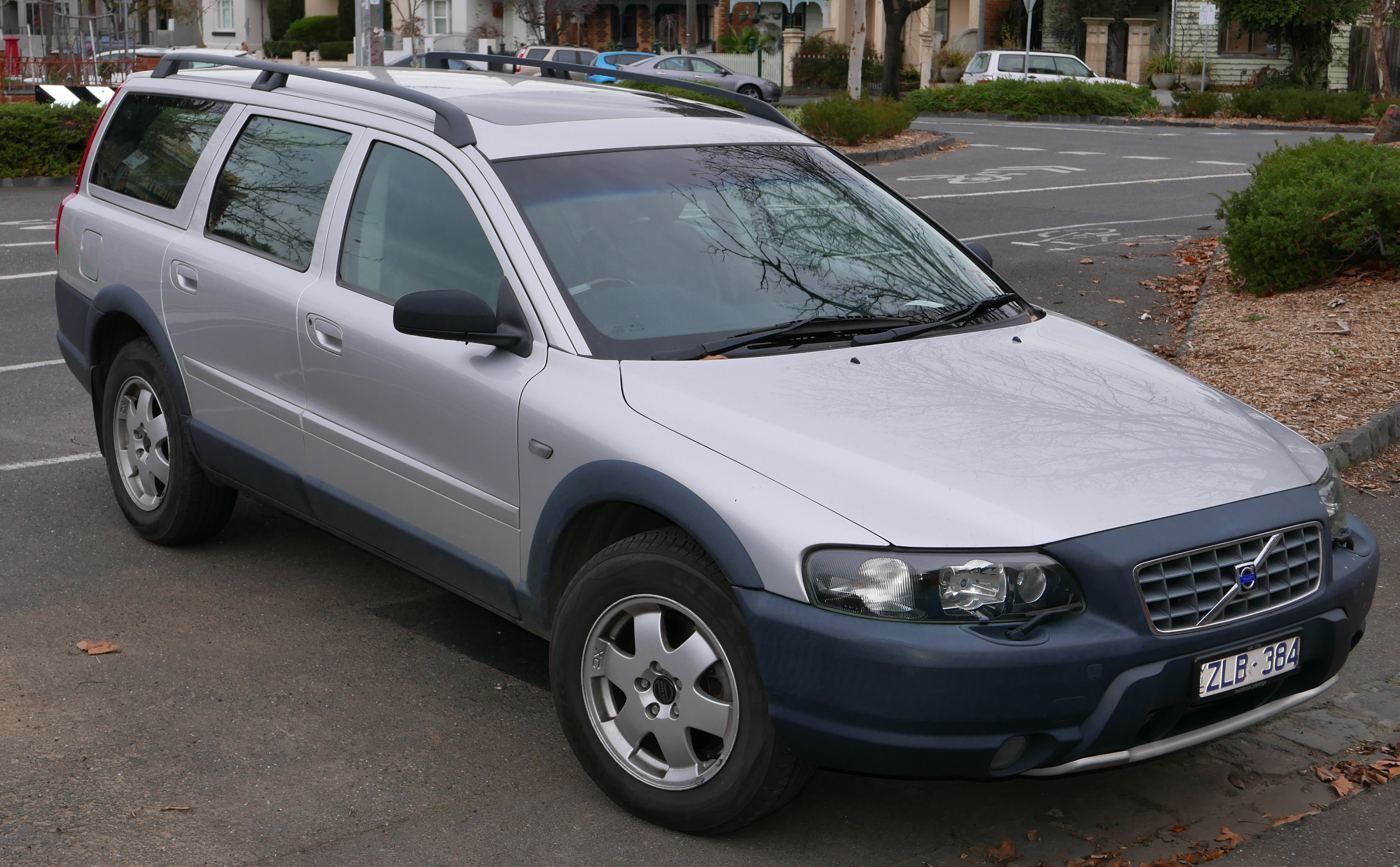
2003–2008 Volvo XC70

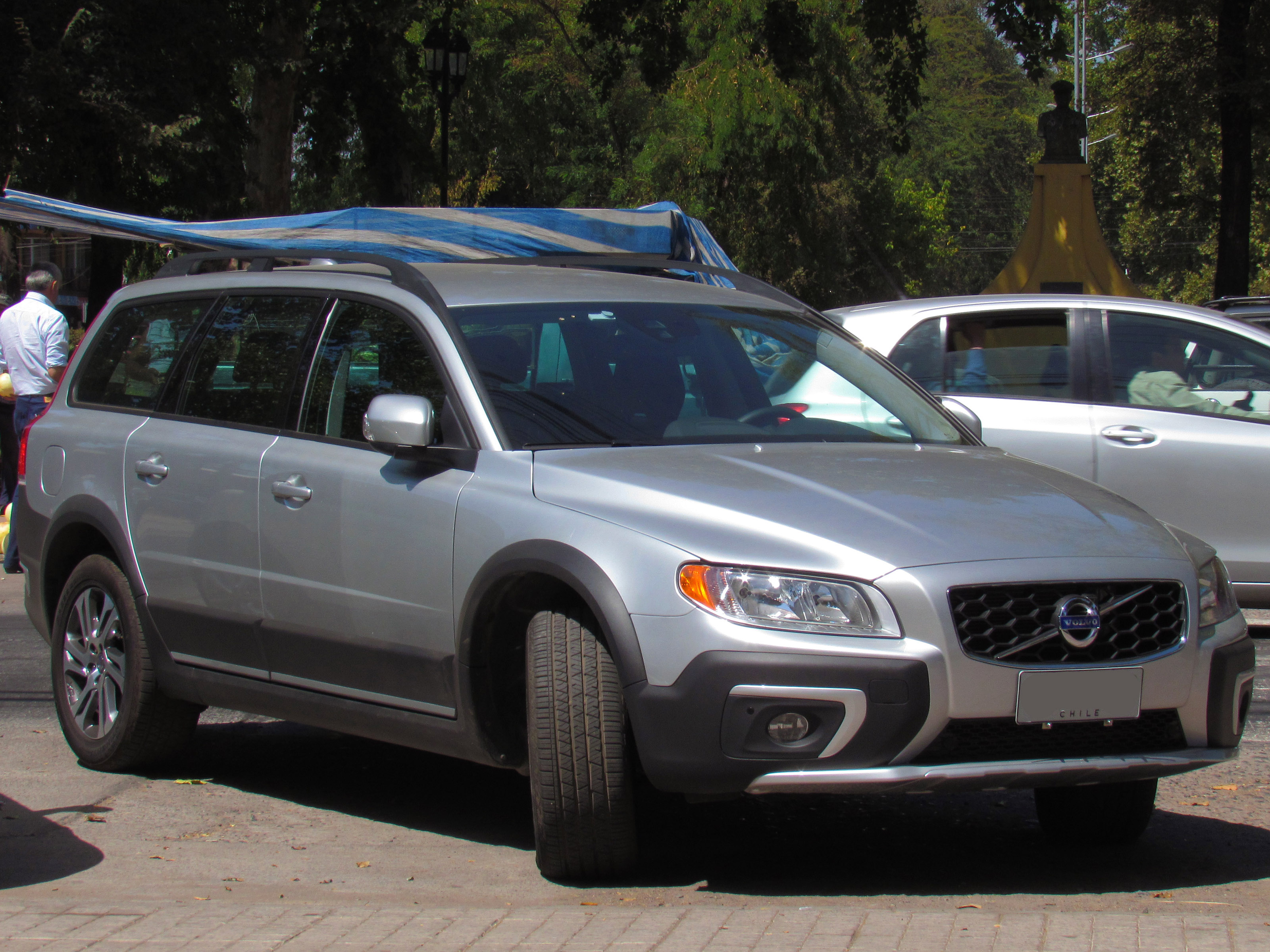
2009–2016 Volvo XC70

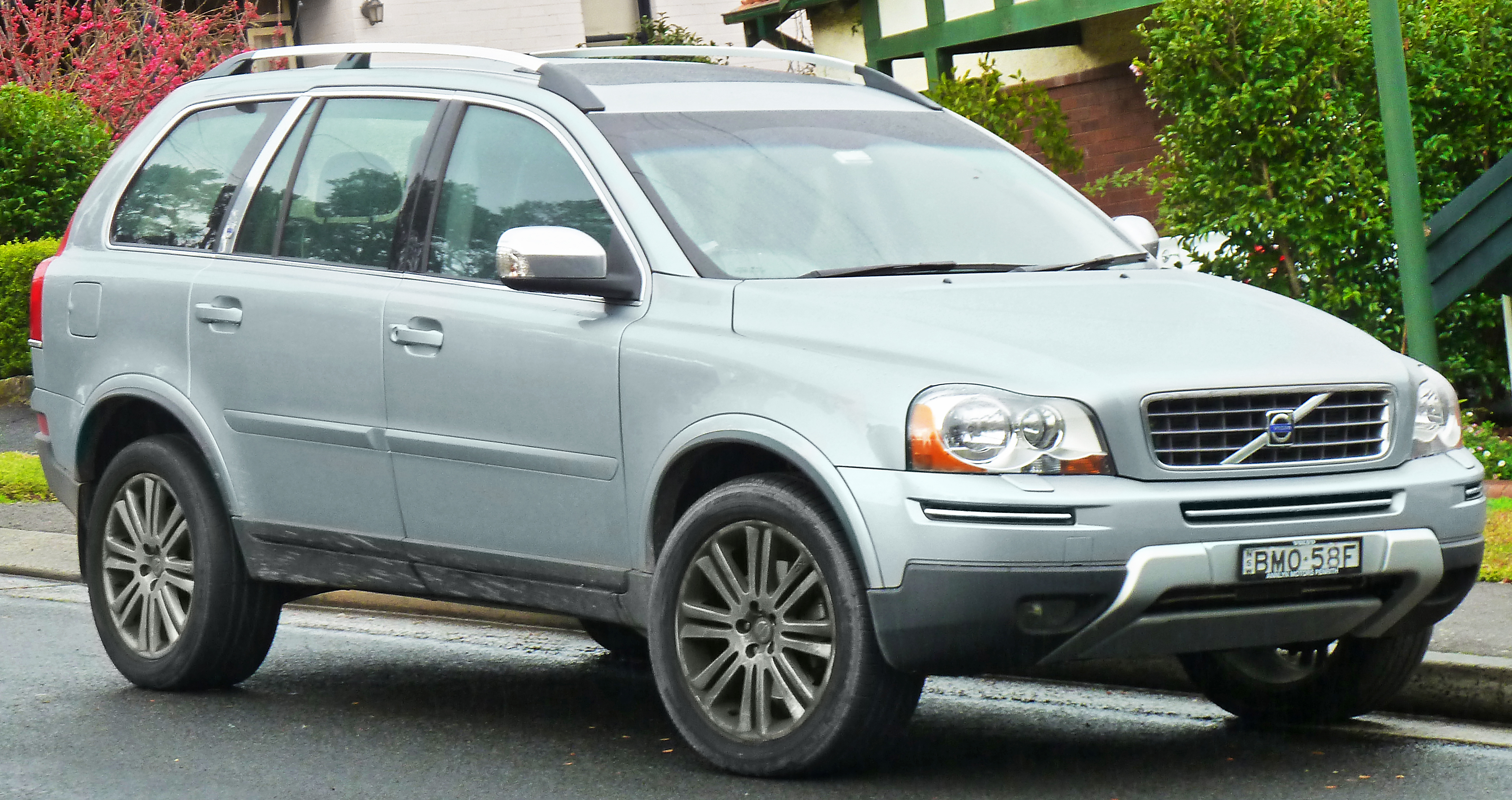
2002–2014 Volvo XC90

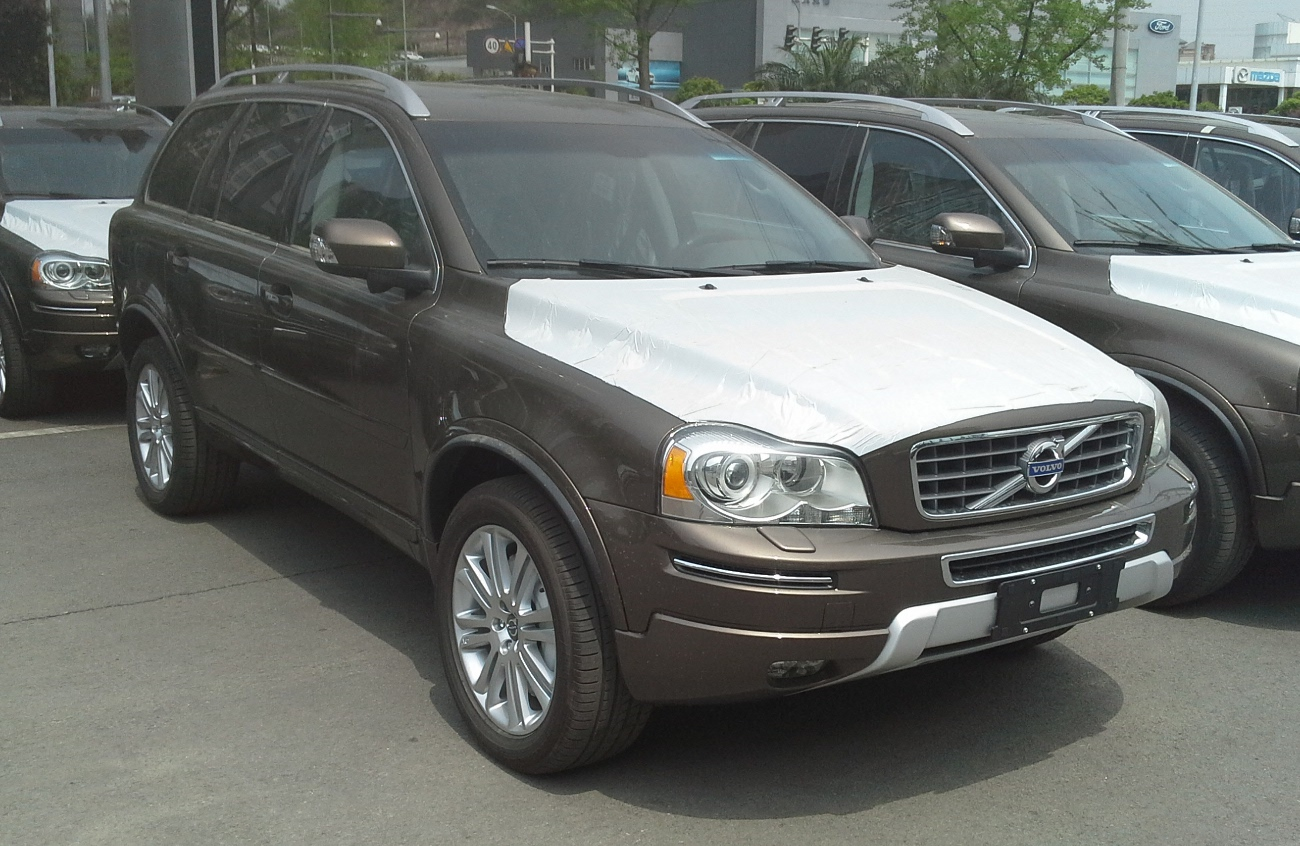
2014–2016 Volvo XC Classic

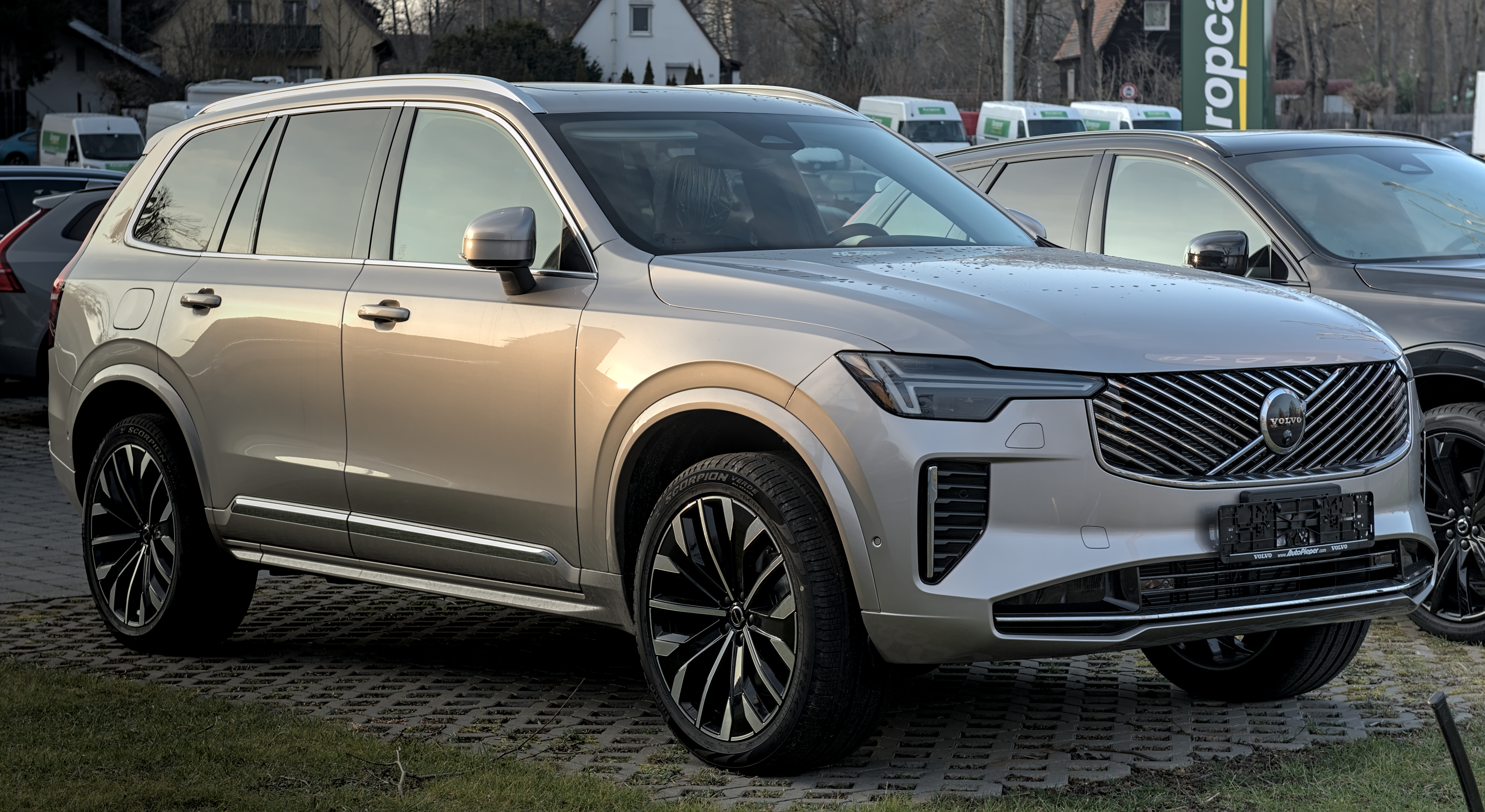
2015–present Volvo XC90

== Concept ==
- Volvo Concept XC Coupe (2014)
- Volvo XC60 (2007)

=== Gallery ===
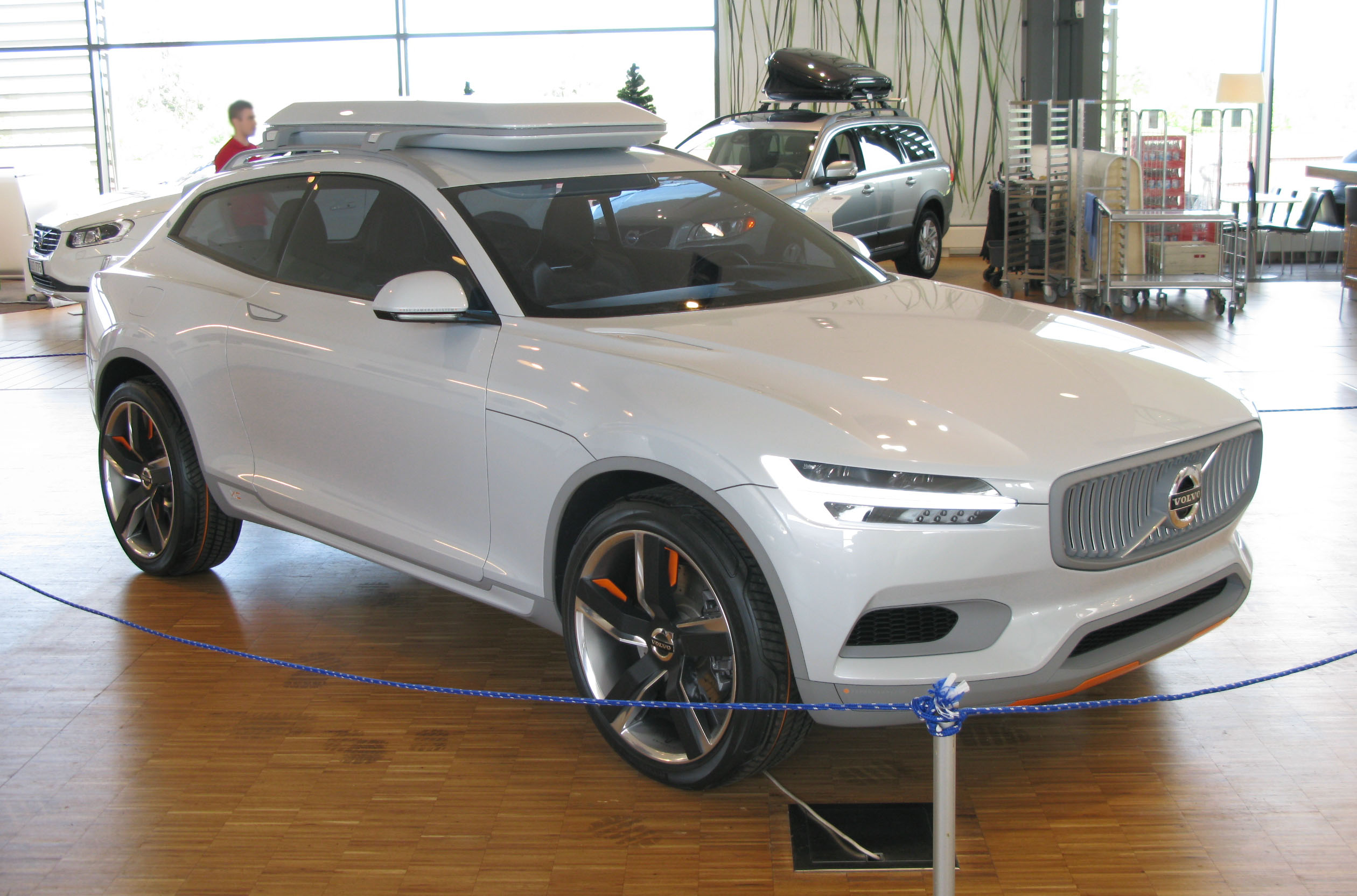
2014 Volvo Concept XC Coupe

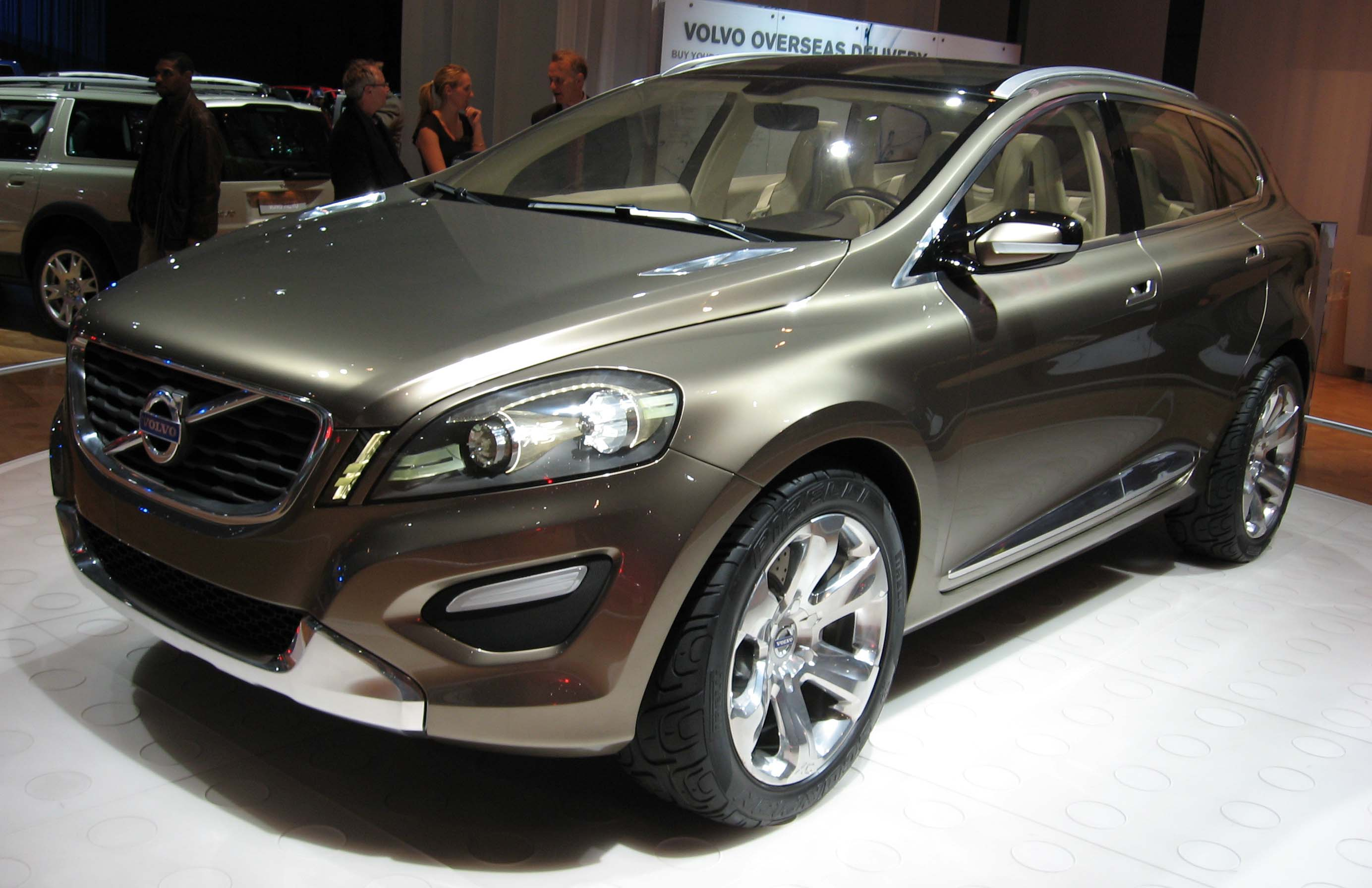
2007 Volvo XC60

== See also ==
- Volvo Cross Country (disambiguation)
