= Cross County (disambiguation) =

Cross County is a county in the U.S. state of Arkansas.

Cross County may also refer to:

- Cross County Parkway, an east–west parkway in Westchester County, New York
- Cross County Shopping Center, a mall in Yonkers, New York
- Cross County Mall (Illinois), Mattoon, Illinois
- Cross County Mall (Florida), West Palm Beach, Florida
