= Cross River =

Cross River may refer to:

== Places ==
=== Canada ===
- Cross River (British Columbia), a tributary of the Kootenay River

=== Nigeria ===
- Cross River (Nigeria)
  - Cross River gorilla (Gorilla gorilla diehli)
- Cross River State, in southeastern Nigeria, named after the above river
- Cross River languages, a branch of the Benue-Congo languages subgroup of the Niger-Congo languages

=== United States ===
- Cross River (Maine), a tributary of the Sheepscot River
- Cross River (Gunflint Lake), a river in Minnesota
- Cross River (Lake Superior), a river in Minnesota
- Cross River (Little Fork River tributary), a river in Minnesota
- Cross River (New York), a tributary of the Croton River
- Cross River, New York, a hamlet in the town of Lewisboro

== Other uses ==
- Cross River Bank, a community bank based in Fort Lee, New Jersey, US
- Cross River Rail, a proposed railway line in Brisbane, Australia

== See also ==
- Cross (disambiguation)
