= Cruce =

Cruce is a surname. Notable people with the surname include:

- Jamie Cruce, American football coach and player
- Lee Cruce (1863–1933), American lawyer, banker, and politician
- Petrus de Cruce (13th century), French cleric, composer, and music theorist

== See also ==
- Cruces (disambiguation)
