= X-Out =

X-Out can refer to:

- X-Out, a type of acrobatic flip
- X-Out (video game)
- Cross out, to strikeout; to produce ~~strikethrough text~~

== See also ==
- X'ed Out, 2013 album by Tera Melos
- Crossed out (disambiguation)
- Out (disambiguation)
- X (disambiguation)
