= Crossed =

Crossed may refer to:

- Crossed (comics), a 2008 comic book series by Garth Ennis
- Crossed (novel), a 2011 young adult novel by Ally Condie
- "Crossed" (The Walking Dead), an episode of the television series The Walking Dead
- Crossed, an upcoming American post-apocalyptic horror film based on the aforementioned comic book

== See also ==
- Crossed out (disambiguation)
- Cross (disambiguation)
