= Crveni Krst =

Crveni Krst (Cyrillic: Црвени Крст, "Red Cross") may refer to:

- Crveni Krst, Belgrade, an urban neighborhood of the city of Belgrade, Serbia, in the municipality of Vračar
- Crveni Krst, Niš, a municipality of the city of Niš, Serbia
- Crveni Krst (neighborhood), an urban neighborhood of the city of Niš, Serbia, center of the municipality of the same name
- Crveni Krst concentration camp, a concentration camp which operated in Serbia from 1941 to 1944
- The Red Cross of Serbia (Serbian: Crveni krst Srbije)

== See also ==
- Red Cross (disambiguation)
