= Cruces =

Cruces, the formal plural of crux and a Spanish word for "crosses", may refer to:

- Cruces, Cuba, a town in Cuba
- Cruces River, a river in Chile
  - Río Cruces Bridge, a bridge that crosses Cruces River
- Cruces River (Puerto Rico)
- Cruces, Aguada, Puerto Rico, a barrio
- Cruces, Rincón, Puerto Rico, a barrio
- Cruces - Gurutzeta, a neighbourhood in Barakaldo, Spain
  - Gurutzeta/Cruces (Bilbao Metro), metro station in that neighbourhood
- Cruces (peak), highest point of the Sierra de San Vicente, Sistema Central, Spain
- Las Cruces, New Mexico, United States
- Vila de Cruces, a town in Galicia, Spain
- Villanueva de las Cruces, a town in Andalusia, Spain

== See also ==
- Crux (disambiguation)
- Cruce, a surname
