= Cross Island =

Cross Island may refer to:

== Geography ==
- Cross Island, Alaska, an island in the Beaufort Sea
- Cross Island, Bermuda
- Cross Island, County Down, a townland in Northern Ireland
- Cross Island (Maine), an island in the U.S. state of Maine
  - Cross Island National Wildlife Refuge, a National Wildlife Refuge in the state of Maine, U.S.
- Cross Island (Massachusetts), an island in the U.S. state of Massachusetts
- Cross Island (Nova Scotia), an island offshore from Lunenburg, Nova Scotia
- Cross Island, Mumbai, an uninhabited islet off the southeast coast of Mumbai
- Cross Island Trail, a rail trail in Queen Anne's County, Maryland and part of the American Discovery Trail and the East Coast Greenway

== Transportation ==
- Cross Island Line, a subway line in Singapore
- Cross Island Parkway (Hilton Head Island), in South Carolina, U.S.
- Cross Island Parkway, a highway in Long Island, New York, U.S.

== Other uses ==
- Cross Island Chapel, a non-denominational church located in Oneida, New York

== See also ==
- Cross Bronx Expressway
- Cross country (disambiguation)
- Cross County
