= Crossing (sculpture) =

Public artwork in Chicago, Illinois, U.S.

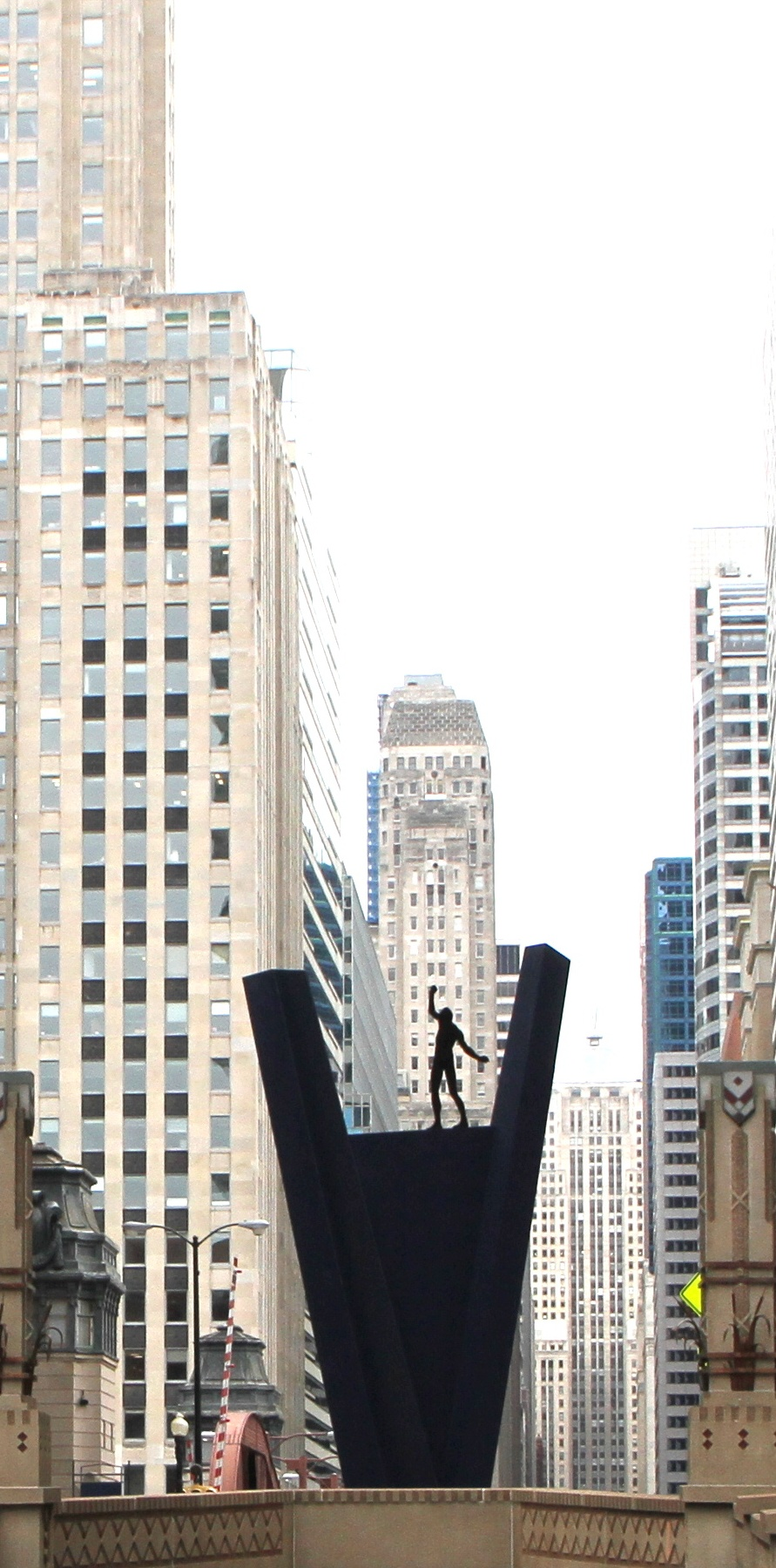
- The sculpture in 2014
- Artist: Hubertus Von Der Goltz
- Location: Chicago, Illinois, U.S.
- 41°53′18.9″N 87°37′57.1″W

Crossing is a sculpture by Hubertus Von Der Goltz, installed on La Salle Street in Chicago, Illinois. The 25-foot-tall steel artwork has a statue of a man on top of a V-shaped structure. Installed in 1998, it is the only extant permanent work from the 17th annual International Sculpture Conference hosted by Chicago.
