= Volvo Cross Country =

Volvo Cross Country may refer to vehicles sold by AB Volvo:

- Volvo C202
- Volvo C3-series (C303, C304 and C306)
- Volvo EX30 Cross Country
- Volvo S60 Cross Country
- Volvo V40 Cross Country
- Volvo V60 Cross Country
- Volvo V70 Cross Country/XC70
- Volvo V90 Cross Country
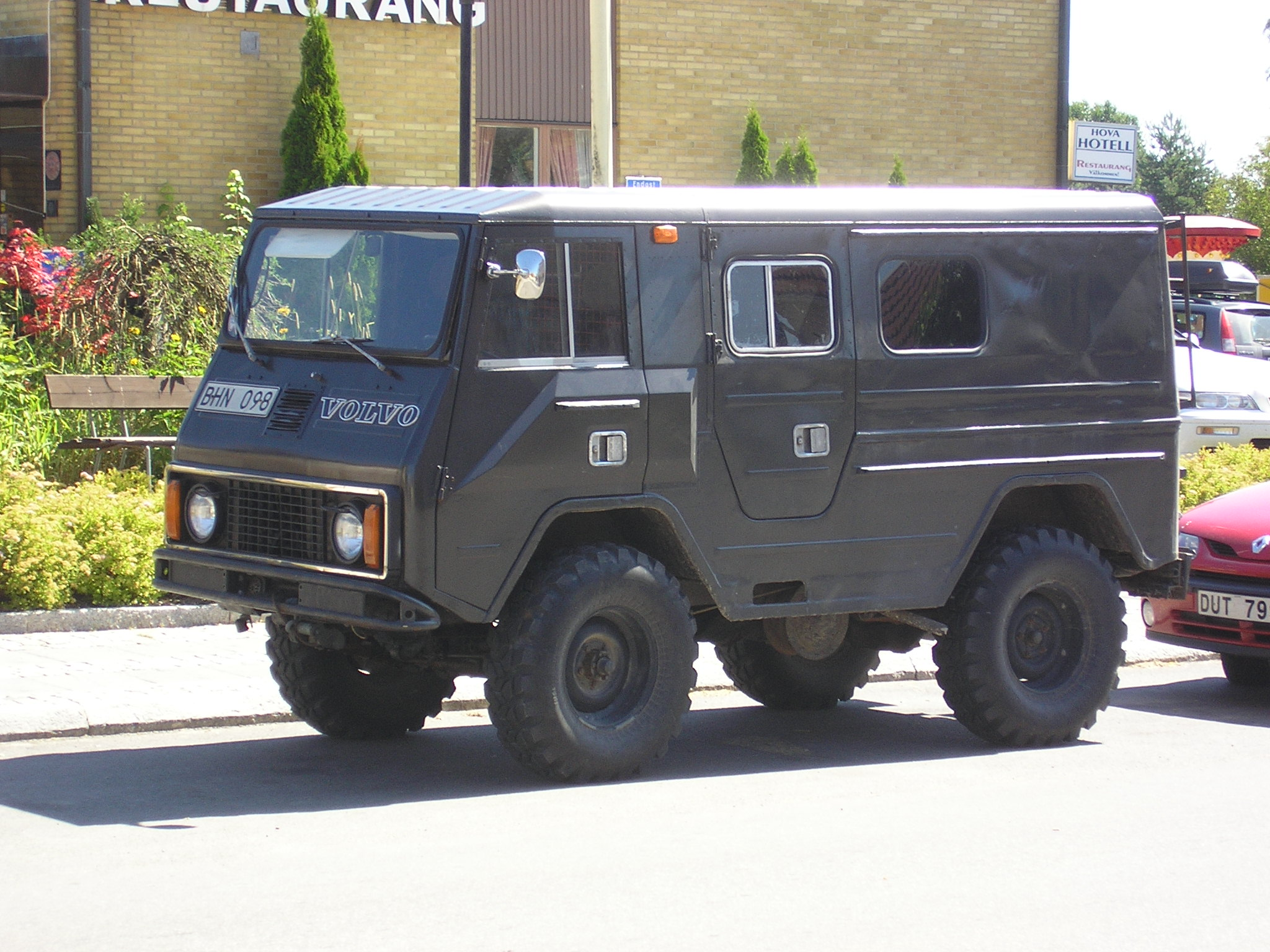
Volvo C202

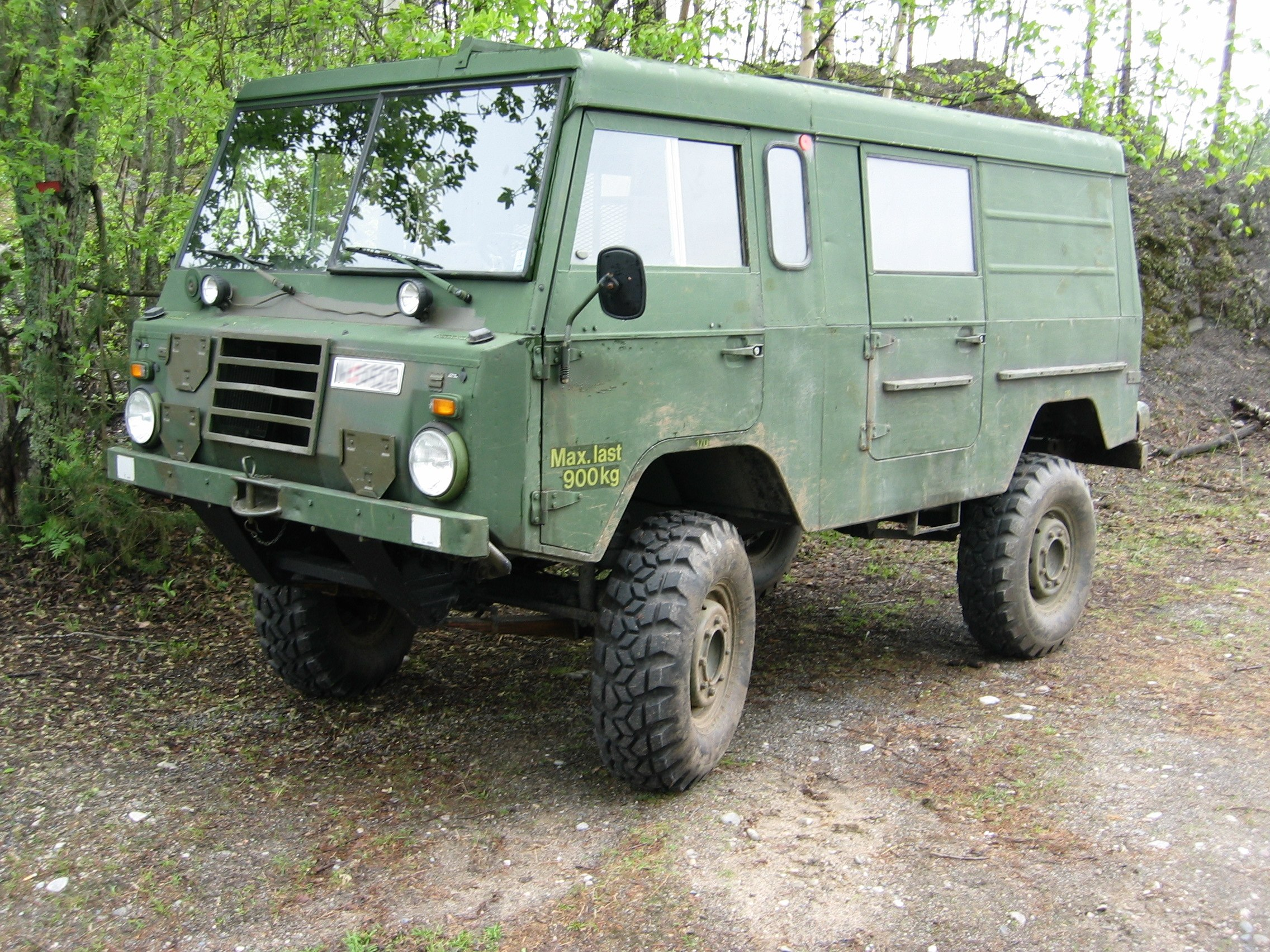
Volvo C3-series

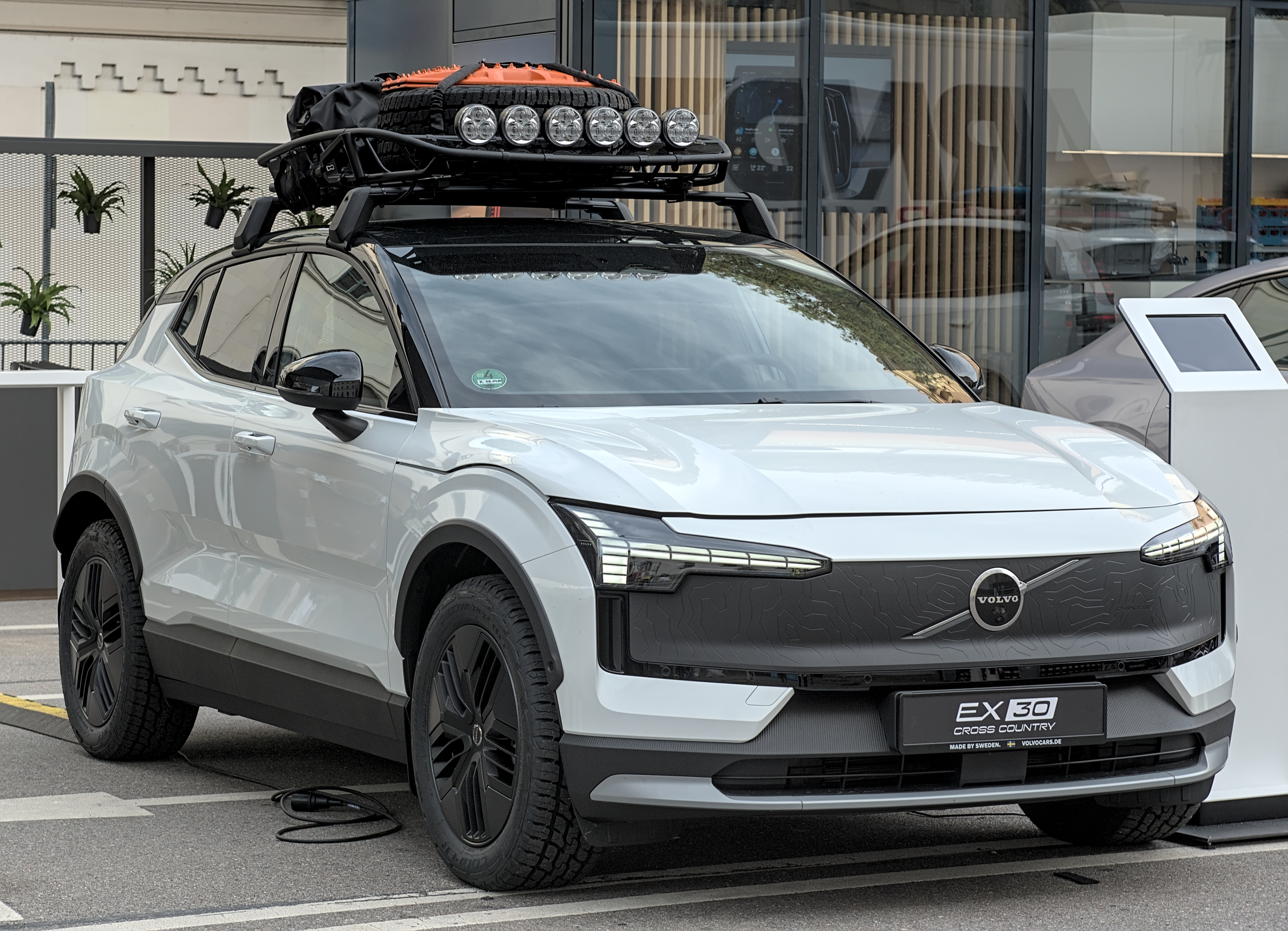
Volvo EX30 Cross Country

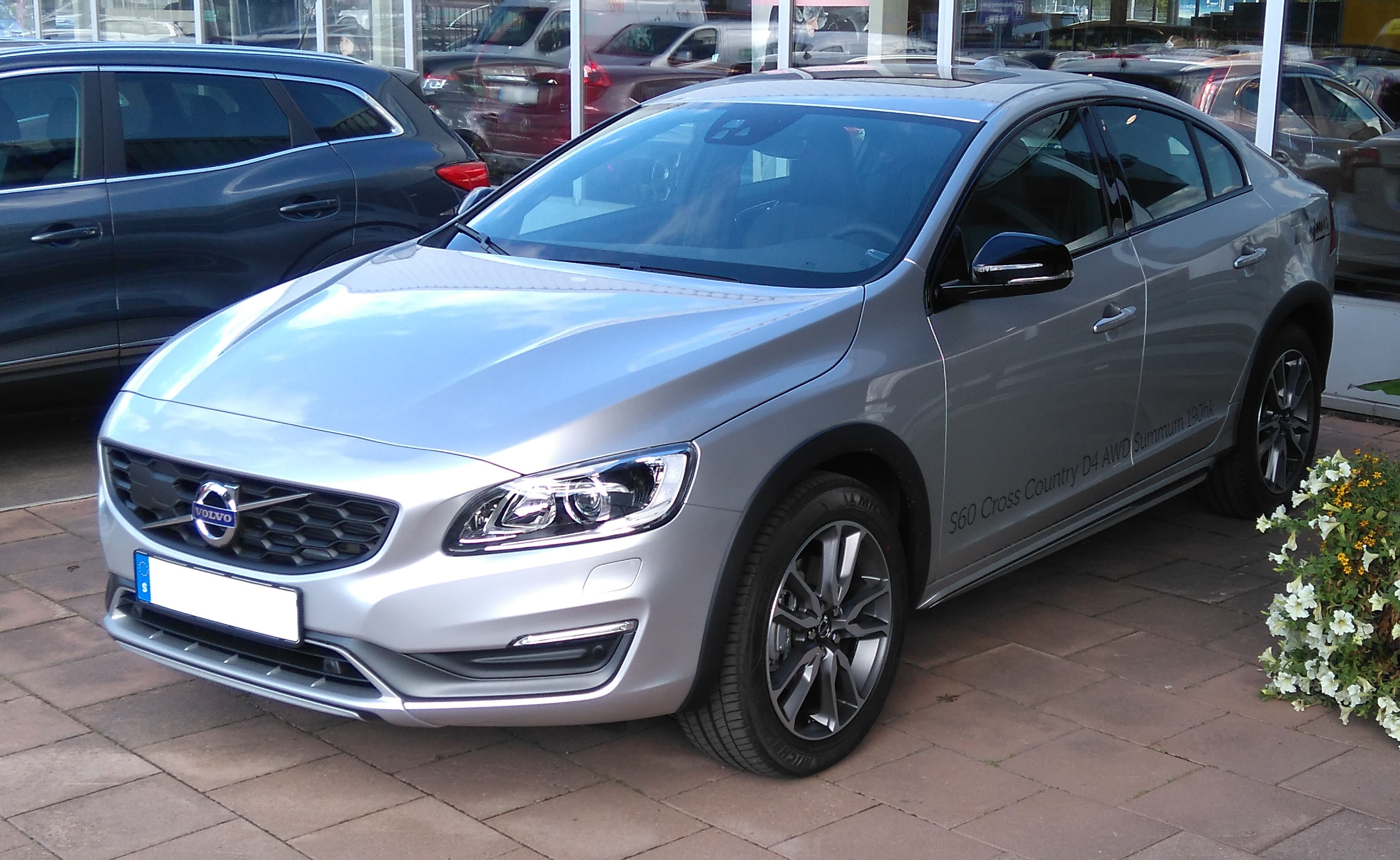
Volvo S60 Cross Country

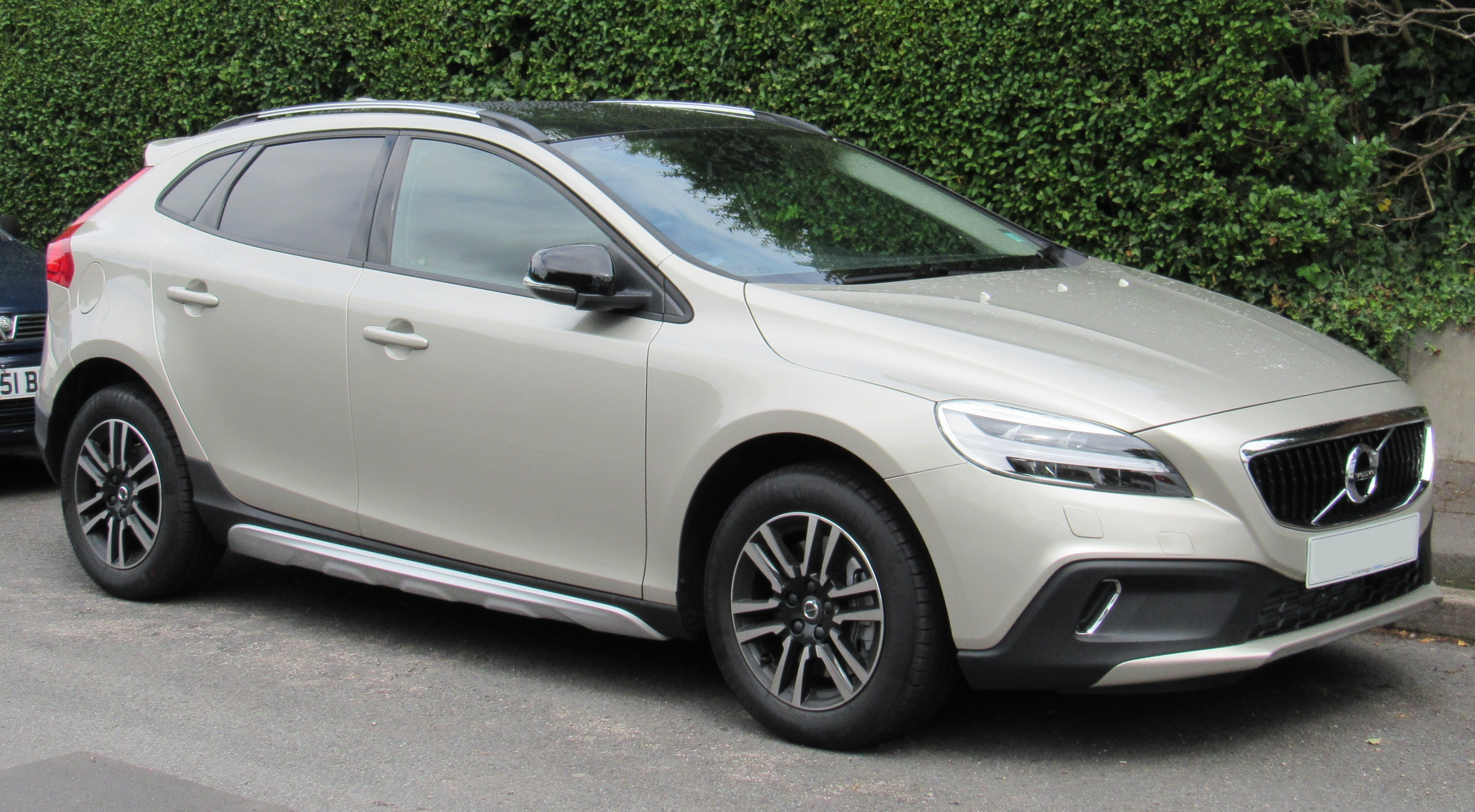
Volvo V40 Cross Country

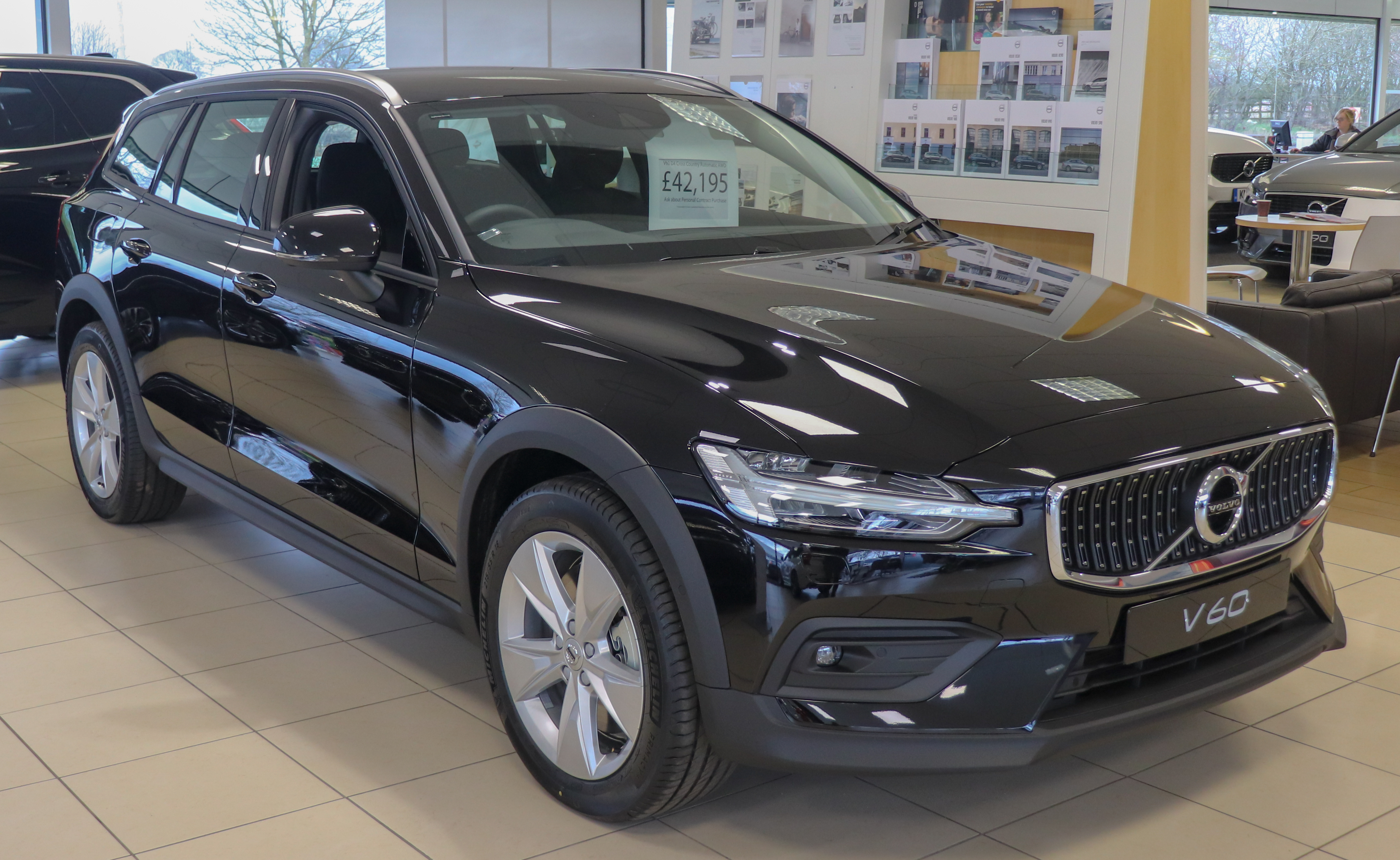
Volvo V60 Cross Country

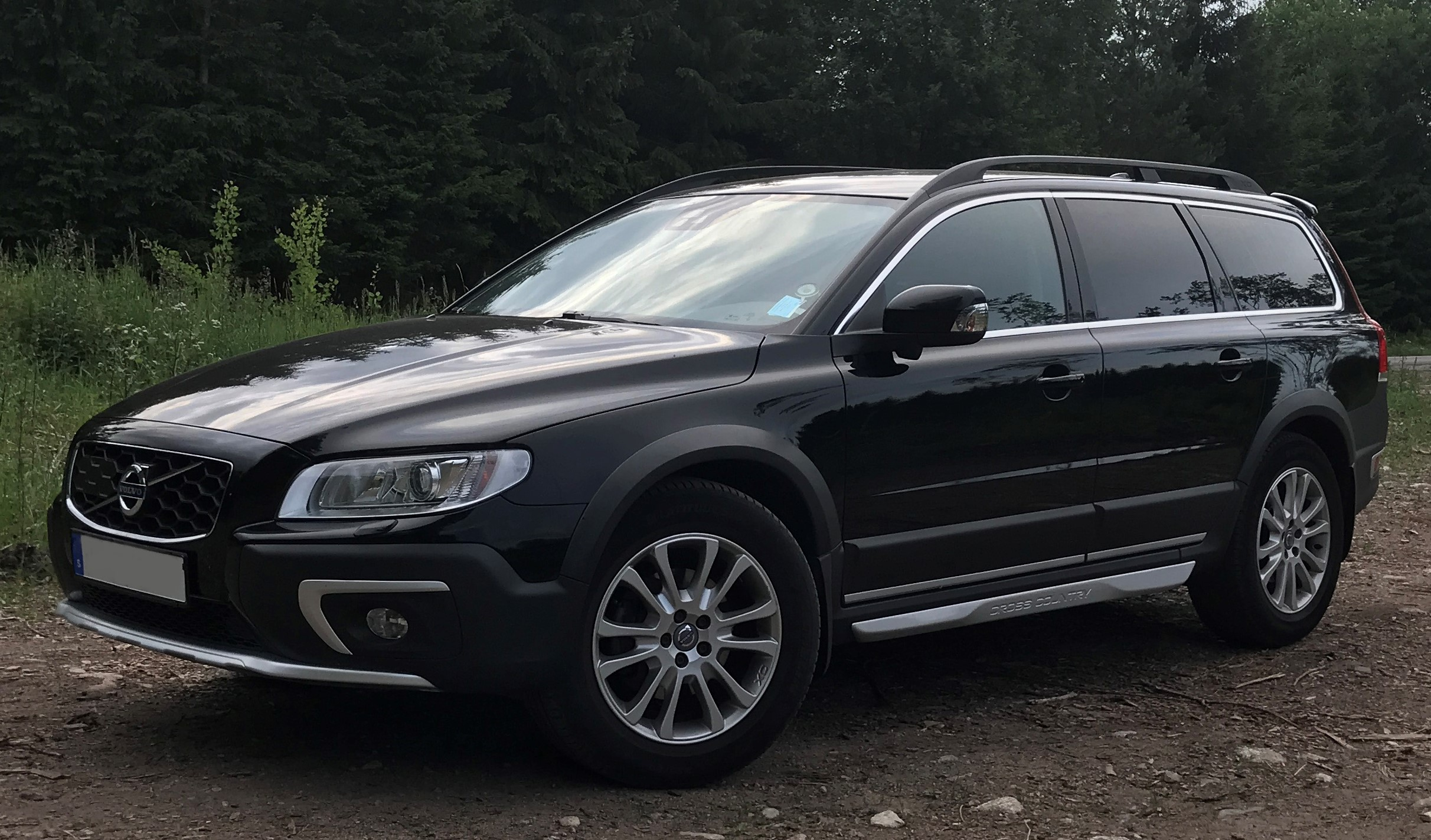
Volvo V70 Cross Country/XC70

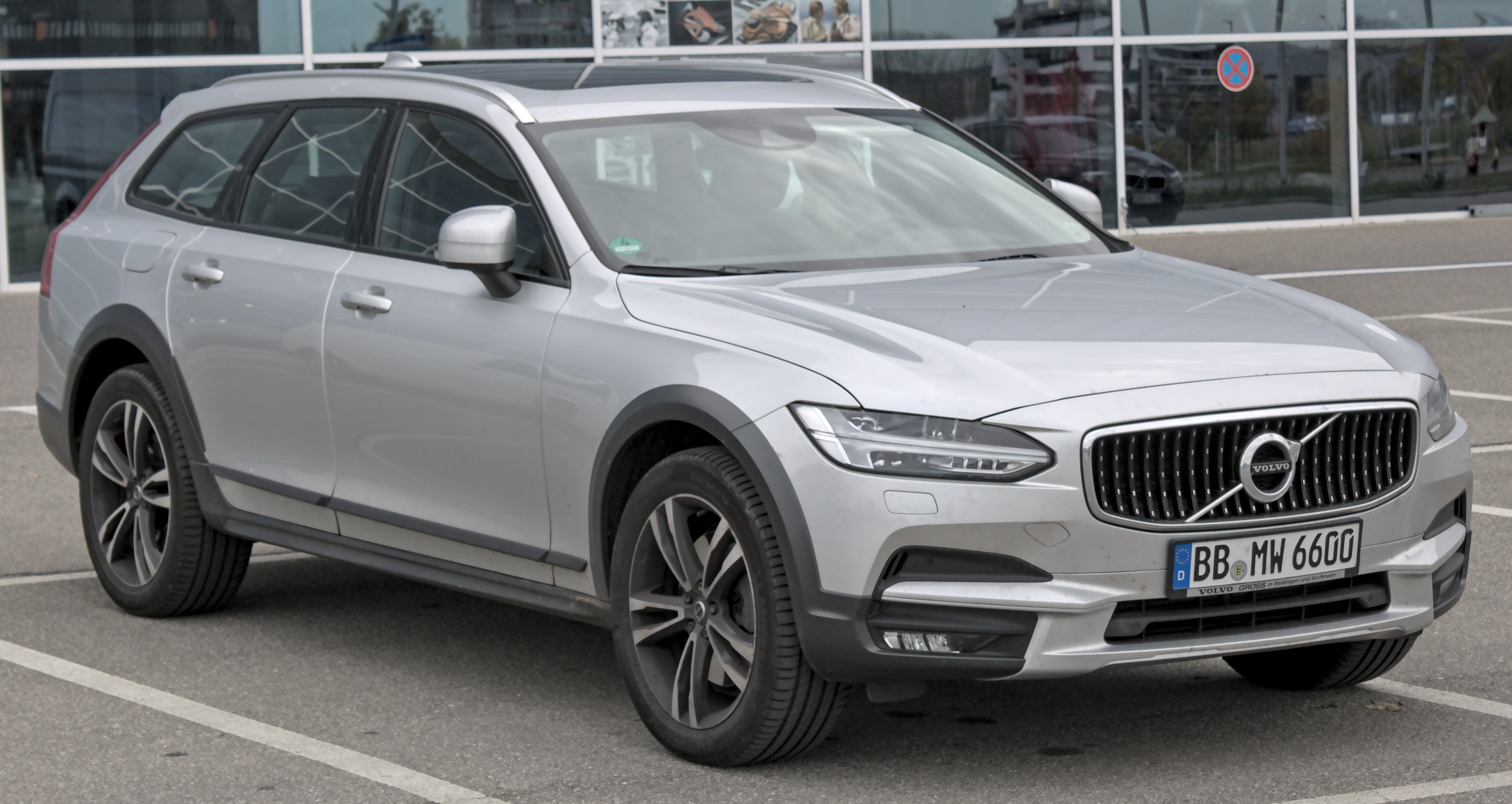
Volvo V90 Cross Country

== See also ==
- Cross Country (Volvo)
