= Cross Country (Volvo) =

Cross Country is a series of Volvo models.

It has been used for the following cars:

- 1997–2007 Volvo V70 XC
- 2007–2016 Volvo XC70
- 2016–2025 Volvo V90 XC
- 2012–2019 Volvo V40 XC
- 2010–present Volvo V60 XC

== See also ==
- Volvo Cross Country (disambiguation)
