= Crossings (journal) =

- Discipline: Art and technology
- Language: English
- Edited by: Mads Haahr

Publication details
- History: 2001-present
- Publisher: Trinity College Dublin (Ireland)
- Frequency: Irregular

Standard abbreviations
- ISO 4: Crossings

Indexing
- ISSN: 1649-0460
- OCLC no.: 474578526

Links
- Journal homepage

Crossings: Electronic Journal of Art and Technology is a peer-reviewed academic journal published by Trinity College Dublin. It publishes papers, commentaries, reviews, response papers, and work in progress statements discussing art and technology and their intersections. It was established in 2001. The editor-in-chief is Mads Haahr. It has been on indefinite hiatus since 2012.

The journal is indexed by EBSCO in the databases Art & Architecture Complete and the H. W. Wilson Art Index.
