= Cross Country (automobile) =

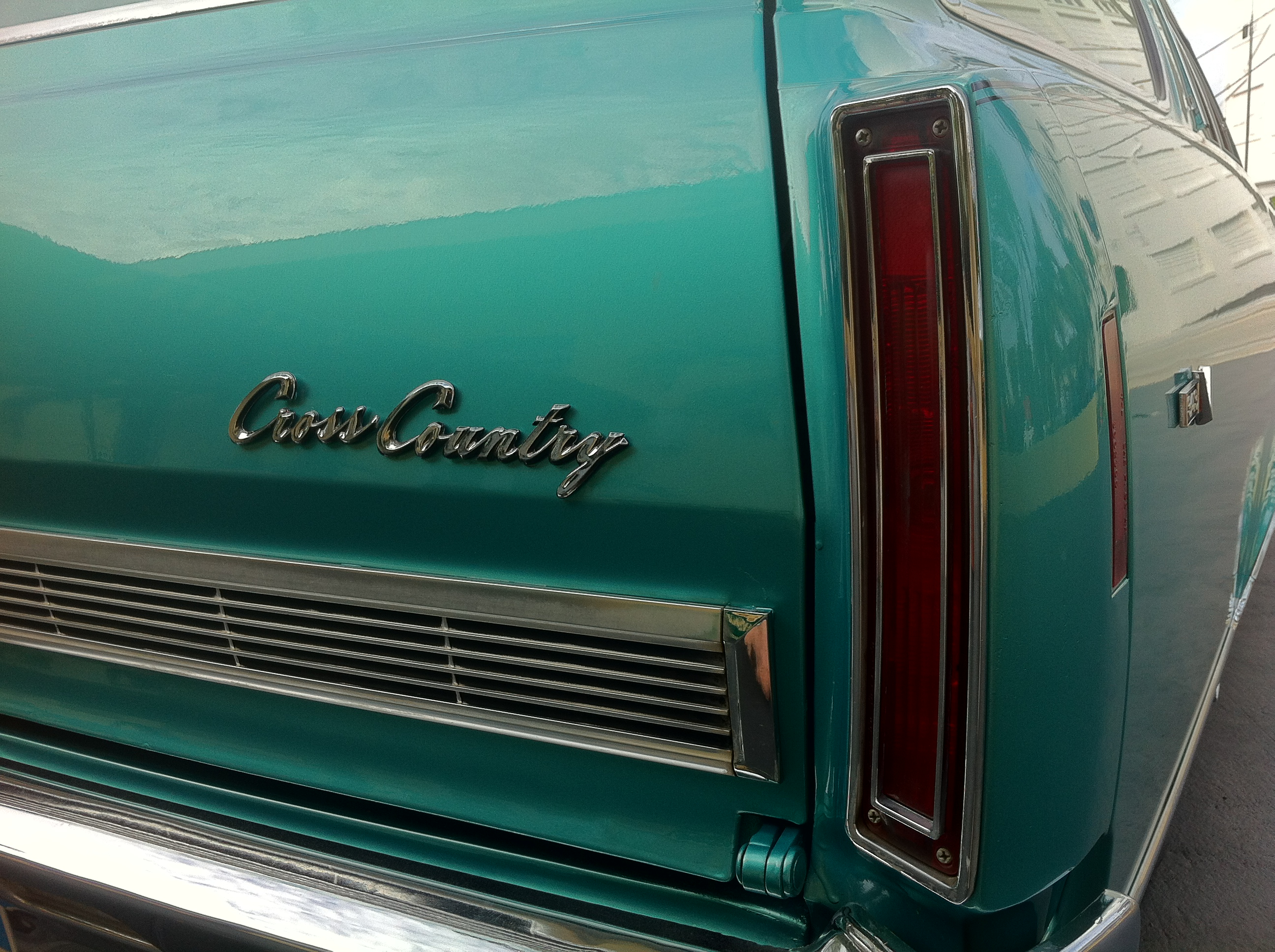
Cross Country emblem on the tailgate of a 1968 AMC Ambassador

Cross Country is an automobile model name for the station wagon versions of the:

- AMC Ambassador, model years 1958 through 1968
- AMC Rebel, model years 1967 and 1968
- Nash Rambler, model years 1954 and 1955
- Rambler Classic, model years 1961 through 1966
- Rambler Six and V8, model years 1956 through 1960
