= Crosses (Warhol) =

Series of works by Andy Warhol

Crosses is a series of works by the American artist Andy Warhol, which he completed between 1981 and 1982. Warhol was raised Catholic in a profoundly religious family in Pittsburgh, where he attended multiple services a week. Vincent Fremont investigated the series while at ARTnews and established a complete list of the series.

== Works ==
- Dozens of colored Polaroid's showing wooden crosses in varying arrangements on the floor are in possession of the Andy Warhol Foundation for the Visual arts, Inc., New York. The crosses that were used for this purpose (4.8 in × 2.6 in, 122 mm × 66 mm) are kept in the Andy Warhol Museum in Pittsburgh.
- Four drawings, graphite on hand-made paper, ca. 32 in × 24 in (810 mm × 610 mm), are in possession of the Andy Warhol Foundation.
- Eleven paintings, silkscreen prints on acrylic on canvas, 20 in × 16 in (510 mm × 410 mm); four of them owned by the Andy Warhol Foundation, three owned by the Anthony d'Offay Gallery, London, and four others are in possession of the Andy Warhol Museum. They present the twelve crosses in different colors, shown in three horizontal rows with four crosses to a row. In comparison to the large-scale series they are shown the wrong way round.
- Nineteen paintings, silkscreen prints on acrylic on canvas, 90 in × 70 in (2,300 mm × 1,800 mm); four of them in possession of the Diozesanmuseum Kiln; two others owned by the Andy Warhol Museum; thirteen others owned by the Andy Warhol Foundation. One of these works sold at Sotheby's on June 30, 2020 for US$2,660,000.
