= Cross County Mall (Florida) =

Cross County Plaza
- Cross County Mall in 1980
- Location: West Palm Beach, Florida, United States
- Coordinates: 26.705°N 80.109°W
- Address: 4348 Okeechobee Blvd.
- Opened: 1979
- Closed: 1997 (original mall)
- Developer: Wespac Investments
- Num. of stores: 50
- Num. of anchor tenants: 4
- Floor area: 365,000 sq ft (33,900 m^{2})
- Floors: 1

Cross County Mall was a partially enclosed mall located west of West Palm Beach, Florida at Military Trail and Okeechobee Blvd, approximately 2 miles (3.2 km) west of Interstate 95. The site is within 1.5 miles (2.4 km) of Florida's Turnpike and Palm Beach International Airport. It was purchased in September 1997 and subsequently demolished and revamped into Cross County Plaza, a power center with some of the original anchors. It now features a Ross, Presidente Supermarket, Ollie's Bargain Outlet and many chain and local shops and restaurants.

== History ==
The mall's main concourse looking toward Kmart as it appeared in 1985.

The mall was developed by Wespac Investments as a local regional shopping mall for residents in suburban West Palm Beach. It was anchored by an 8 screen AMC Theatres, Jefferson Ward (later Kmart) and Britt's (later Ross Dress for Less). Several out parcels such as Chili's and Red Robin (now IHOP) surrounded the mall. Owner Wespac Investments declared bankruptcy in March 1988 and began to let many things deteriorate. Many tenants were unsatisfied with the condition of the mall and choose not to renew their leases. A fire caused by an irresponsible employee at the Builders Square in 1993 further hastened the demise of the mall.

== Redevelopment ==
After demolition of the mall was complete in late 1997, Swerdlow Group reworked the lot to keep many anchors and leased to new ones. New leases were negotiated with Kmart, Ross, and Winn-Dixie providing for their relocation into new premises at current market rental rates. The new owners failed to lure back some other former tenants such as AMC Theatres which left Palm Beach County altogether earlier that year having closed their last location in Delray Beach. Kmart closed their Cross County Plaza location in the summer of 2016. In 2019 Southeastern Grocers announced the closure of 22 stores including the Cross County Plaza location.

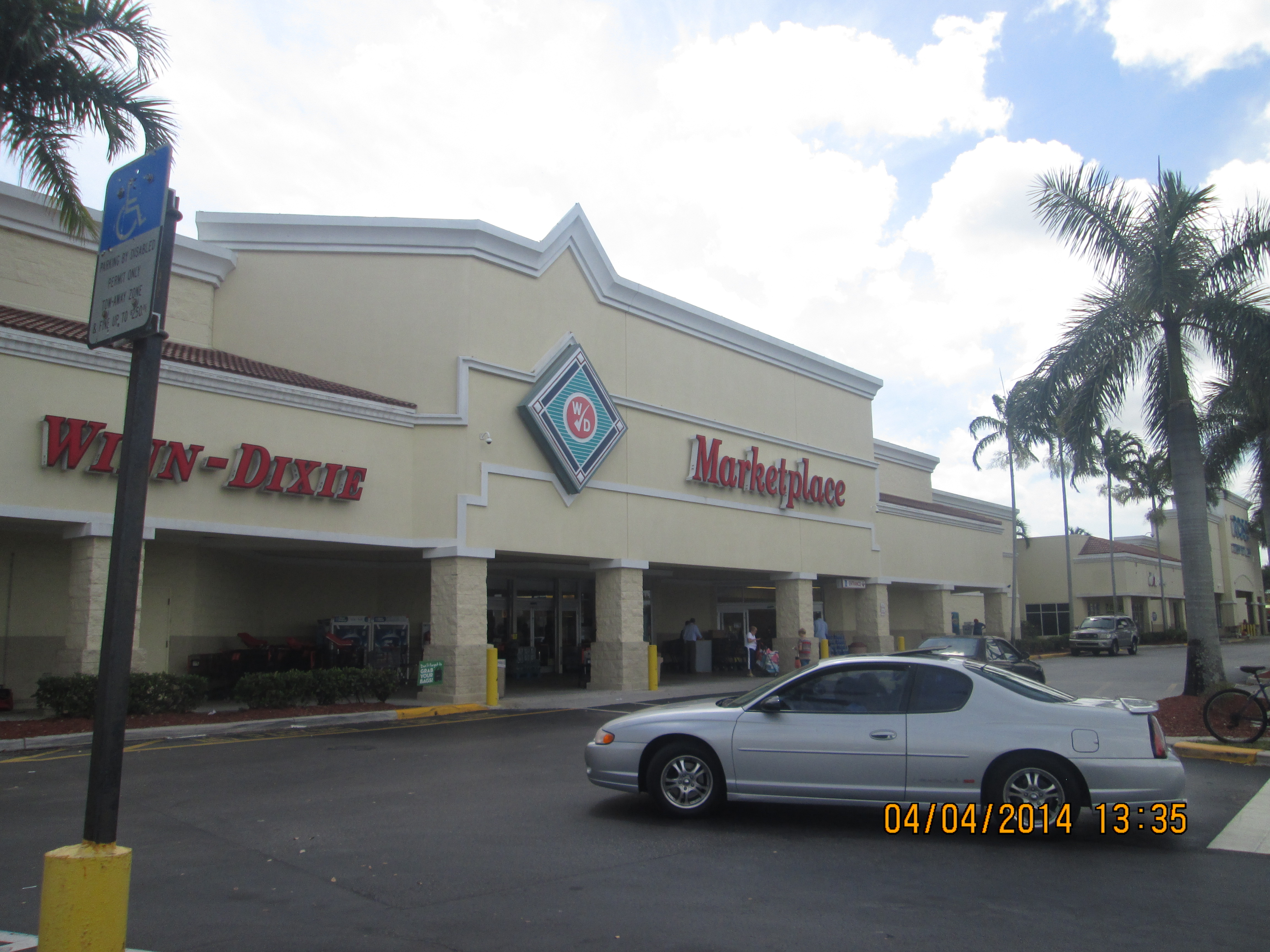
A Today store which is a Winn-Dixie closed its store in 2019
