= The Crossing Church =

Coordinates: 39.928893°N 91.341207°W

The Crossing
- The Crossing
- Location: 150 S. 48th St. Quincy, IL 62305
- Country: United States
- Denomination: Non-denominational
- Website: www.thecrossing.net

History
- Founded: 1970

Clergy
- Pastor: Jerry Harris

The Crossing is an independent, non-denominational church headquartered in Quincy, Illinois, associated with the Christian Churches in the Restoration Movement. The church oversees locations in Hannibal, Missouri, Jacksonville, Illinois, Keokuk, Iowa, Kirksville, Missouri, Lima, Illinois, Macomb, Illinois, Monmouth, Illinois, Mount Sterling, Illinois, Pike County, Illinois, and two locations in Quincy, Illinois and maintains an online presence.

The church was founded in 1970 as a daughter church of Madison Park Christian Church. Weekend church attendance averaged around 6,500 in person in 2023 with the total estimated at 13,000 including online. The Crossing was listed as one of the fastest-growing churches in the United States, and the fastest-growing church in the U.S. state of Illinois.

== Church history ==
Madison Park Christian Church, then located at 25th and High streets in Quincy, Illinois, gave 78 members on March 3, 1974, to form Payson Road Christian Church meeting at 2901 Payson Road also in Quincy. The new church experienced stagnation until 1998 when leadership decided to find an environment that would ideally reduce intimidation for attendees not accustomed to church meetings. The church soon became a mobile congregation and later changed its name to The Crossing Church.

== Quincy Campus ==
The church began discussions with John Wood Community College about acquiring parts of the property, which later turned into a lease-purchase agreement for the entire property once the college's new building at 48th and Harrison streets in Quincy was finished. Members had a more permanent location to meet: The old college basketball gym. As the church's attendance grew, The Crossing had to hold up to four services per weekend to accommodate a large number of worshipers in the small gym. In 2005, The Crossing completed a 2,000 seat auditorium designed to accommodate current attendees and future expansion. They now have 3 services each week 6pm on Thursday night, 9am, and 10:45am on Sunday morning

== Multi-Site Campus ==
The Crossing Church decided shortly after completing the new auditorium to open in multiple locations. Leadership wanted to focus on towns like Quincy—areas with stagnant population trends and relatively few options for churches that focused on young people and families. Many of the multi-site locations have the same ministries that Quincy has. Each campus has its own live band and staff. Sermons are streamed live across a high-speed Internet connection to satellite locations.

On October 7, 2007, the first multi-site location was opened in Macomb, Illinois. The Crossing purchased and renovated an abandoned grocery store, which quickly housed the largest congregation in Macomb with an average attendance of 700 in 2010 with its two Sunday morning services at 9 AM and 10:45 AM.

On November 2, 2008, The Crossing opened another multi-site location in Kirksville, Missouri. An abandoned shoe factory was purchased and renovated, much like Macomb's campus. Kirksville's campus has over 400 in weekly attendance at the two Sunday morning services at 9 AM and 10:45 AM.

February 2010, The Crossing introduced the "929 Campus." The campus, formerly owned by Unity Church and built-in 1874, is located at 929 Monroe Street in Quincy. It's designed to be a location that accommodates those who rely on public transportation or who prefer a smaller, more traditional church over the large congregation at 48th and Maine streets. The site houses a food pantry and addiction recovery ministries. The site has a live band; however, it plays a recording of the Saturday evening service to end in time for bus schedules. 929 averages about 300 per weekend.

February 20, 2011, the Pittsfield Campus launched. The first service witnessed about 350 attendees, and some had to stand outside. Since launch, the weekly attendance has leveled off to about 200. Located in Pittsfield, Illinois, in the JDL Building and formerly in the Pike County Senior Center, this campus was designed to serve Crossing members located in the Pittsfield area and to attract new attendees who may not have had many choices for family-friendly churches within a reasonable drive. Unlike all previously started campuses, the church leadership decided to start this campus and future campuses as a portable church, meaning all equipment is set before service and removed from the rented venue after service. The church was moved to a permanent site and renamed the Pike County Crossing to represent access to the entire Pike County community several years later.

May 1, 2011 - The Hannibal, MO Campus currently meets at the historic Orpheum Theatre at 425 Broadway. The Crossing purchased this building and spent 5 months renovating it. A second service was added in September 2012. The launch service on May 1, 2011, was held at the Hannibal YMCA and witnessed about 400 people. Since moving to the permanent location On Broadway in April 2012, attendance continues to grow at a rapid pace. And they have also added a Thur. Night service

November 18, 2012 - The Crossing added a church location in Lima, located on the Northern edge of Lima, IL. The former Federated Church of Lima was suffering from very low attendance and was unable to stay open. In late 2012, the remaining FCL membership took a vote to dissolve the Church and hand the property over to The Crossing with a Right of First Refusal inserted into the deed. The final vote was 24-4 in favor. The building was built after a tornado leveled the old location and several surrounding homes on May 10, 2003. It features a newly remodeled 200 seat sanctuary, a basketball gym, a full kitchen, and several classrooms. Service is at 10:00am on Sunday.

Mt. Sterling, IL Campus -

Keokuk, IA Campus - The Crossing added a church location in Keokuk in 2015. The church opened after the purchase and renovation of a large, vacant private school building.

== Church plants ==
Two former children's ministers went home to Mossel Bay, South Africa, in 2008 after serving at The Crossing in Quincy to open a Crossing location there. The location was considered the second Crossing campus; attendance averaged about 75. Sermons were preached by the Campus Pastor until the Internet became available, then the Quincy sermons were streamed online. However, in October 2010, the elders for The Crossing received a letter from the pastor in Mossel Bay that the Mossel Bay campus no longer wished to be affiliated with The Crossing, and wanted to operate independently.
