= The Crossing (play) =

The Crossing is a 2006 South African one-man play by Jonathan Nkala. The play documents the struggles Nkala had while illegally immigrating from his birth city of Kwekwe, Zimbabwe to Cape Town, South Africa from 2002 to 2006. The original production, titled The Journey, opened November 5, 2006 at the Garage Theatre, a 30-seat house in Hout Bay, Cape Town and was directed by Bo Petersen and starred Nkala. The title was changed in July 2008 after Nkala showed the production to his friends who suggested he make the switch. From 2006-2009 the production was staged by Nkala and Petersen at different theatres, universities, and festivals throughout South Africa and Zimbabwe.

== Background ==
Playwright Jonathan Kumbulani Nkala was born in Kwekwe, Zimbabwe in 1980. Due to the high rates of political corruption in the country, which he called the "Unstable States of Zimbabwe", Jonathan and his childhood friend Jacob Banda decided to flee to South Africa in search of a "life of abundance." While crossing the Limpopo River, the body of water separating the countries, Jacob was drowned by the currents. After receiving his Asylum Seeker Permit in Cape Town, Nkala made a living by selling bead and wire dolls, a common trade in Zimbabwe. To distinguish his products from his competition, he assigned each doll a story which he would tell his potential customers. His storytelling skills got him noticed by a local casting director who gave him a role in a Motorola advertisement where he was coached by director/actress Bo Petersen. The two remained friends after the advertisement was finished and Nkala went back to work selling dolls. Soon after, he told the story of his immigration to a wealthy patron who inspired him to write down his story so that others may appreciate it. A few days later, Jonathan told Petersen about his writing who had the idea of turning into a theatrical piece. The play was quickly created in response to daily xenophobic attacks against Nkala and put up in Peterson's garage in 2006.

== Synopsis ==
The play begins with the singular actor making bead and wire figures as the audience enters the theater. He introduces himself as Khumbu and then describes the town of Kwekwe, Zimbabwe, where Jonathan Nkala grew up, as being corrupt and too expensive for the average Zimbabwean. Wanting a life of abundance, Khumbu and his friend Jacob decide to use the money that they had buried in their back yards to illegally migrate to South Africa. After hitching a ride to the river border between the two countries, the two realize that it would be too difficult to cross with the border patrol present, so they decide to join a group that is walking to Chivara, a town 200 km away from the border post. After three days of walking, the group arrives at the Limpopo River. Khumbu is overwhelmed by the thought of having to swim in the crocodile-filled water, but is then able to trade his shoes to local men in exchange for passage across the river on a large log. After crossing to the other side in South Africa, Khumbu realizes that Jacob had been swept away by the river during their crossing, but cannot report it to the police since he is illegally in the country and reporting would result in his deportation back to Zimbabwe.

Khumbu and the others he migrated with are later employed as tomato pickers on a farm not far from the border. After a week of work, he asks for his weeks pay from the foreman, who initially laughs at him, but then gives him his devastatingly low wages, not nearly enough to give to the farm's truck drivers to transport him away. However, he is able to get a lift from one of the men after helping him to understand his new cellphone by reading the manual, which the driver cannot do. The driver stops at a gas station to drop off tomatoes but does not return for many hours, causing Khumbu to get out of the truck and start walking to Johannesburg. On the way, he encounters another group of migrants, one of whom is able to ask for a ride in a van. The van drops them in a town called Germiston, where a good Samaritan gives them money for train tickets to Johannesburg. In Johannesburg, Khumbu is in awe of the way the people live, from the food, to the presence of dogs as pets, and even the number of Caucasian people. However, despite the decadence of the city, he grows lonely, and creates a wire figure to resemble Jacob to keep him company. After weeks of trying to find employment and living solely off of mulberries he steals from peoples' yards, he gets a job scooping manure in a woman's garden. Although he was told to do it over two days, he accomplishes the task in half of a day, prompting his employer, a real-estate agent named Margaret, to pay him extra as well as keeping him employed working on other houses she would be selling. Despite his new success, Khumbu decides that he wants to get an Asylum Seeker Permit, but finds that it is too expensive in Johannesburg, leading him to hitchhike to Cape Town where he hears that it is free to get one.

The truck driver he receives a ride from starts verbally attacking him in the middle of a drive for not having the full amount of money he wanted and forces him to sit on the floor of the truck for the remainder of the trip. Khumbu then gets his permit in Cape Town and takes a train back to Johannesburg, where he is now able to walk the streets legally. One day, a police officer stops him and demands to see his I.D., rejecting his asylum permit. He is put in the Lindela Repatriation Centre where he calls Margaret to pick him up. He is thrown back in Lindela several times, and has to get his asylum permit renewed every six months in Cape Town, forcing him to move there to no longer be an inconvenience to Margaret. In Cape Town, he makes and sells the wire dolls that he has been crafting on stage. He finishes by telling the audiences that his journey has made him strong and brave and that it has allowed him to appreciate his own intelligence.

== Select productions ==
=== The Garage Theatre (2006) ===
The Journey premiered at The Garage Theatre, a 30-seat house in Bo Petersen's garage in Hout Bay, Cape Town, on November 5, 2006. Jonathan Nkala played himself with Petersen as director. The show returned to the Garage Theatre for single performances in May 2007 and September 2008.

=== Cape Town Holocaust Centre (2008) ===
On November 20, 2008, the South African Holocaust Federation held a daylong symposium to discuss issues involving immigrants and xenophobia and highlight refugee stories. Nkala was invited to stage a performance of The Crossing at this symposium in front of an audience including government officials, members of the South African Police Service, and non-governmental organizations.

== Production history ==
Performance Venue	Location	Date(s)
The Garage Theatre	Hout Bay, Cape Town	November 5, 2006 May 20, 2007 September 21, 2008
Cape Town Holocaust Centre	Cape Town, South Africa	January 29, 2008 November 20, 2008
Baxter Theatre Sanlam Studio	Rondebosch, Cape Town	October 12, 2008
Tsiba University	Pinelands, Cape Town	October 23, 2008
The NewSpace Theatre	Cape Town, South Africa	November 26, 2008
Human Sciences Research Council at Spier Estate	Stellenbosch, Western Cape	November 27, 2008
The Green Dolphin Restaurant	Cape Town, South Africa	December 8, 2008
eTV Studios	Cape Town, South Africa	December 10, 2008
Habonim Camp	Hermanus, Western Cape	December 18, 2008
Infecting the City Festival	Masiphumelele, Cape Town	January 27, 2009
University of the Western Cape	Cape Town, South Africa	February 26, 2009
Harare International Festival of the Arts	Harare, Zimbabwe	April 29–30, 2009
Mbira Centre	Harare, Zimbabwe	May 8–10, 2009
