= Cross-country jump =

A cross-country jump refers to a style of skydive where the participants open their parachutes immediately after jumping, with the intention of covering as much ground under canopy as possible. A cross-country jump is typically planned when the upper winds are strong, allowing the parachutists to cover larger distances.

There are two variations of a cross-country jump:

The most popular one is to plan the exit point upwind of the drop zone. A map and information about the wind direction and velocity at different altitudes are used to determine the exit point. This is usually set at a distance from where all the participants should be able to fly back to the drop zone.

The other variation is to jump out directly above the drop zone and fly down wind as far as possible. This increases the risks of the jump substantially, as the participants must be able to find a suitable landing area before they run out of altitude.

Two-way radios and cell-phones are often used to make sure everyone has landed safely, and, in case of a landing off the drop zone, to find out where the parachutist is so that ground crew can pick them up.
