= John Crosse (antiquary) =

English musical amateur (1786–1833)

John Crosse (7 July 1786 – 20 October 1833) was an English musical amateur, known for his work on the York Musical Festival.

He was born at Kingston upon Hull on 7 July 1786, the son of John Norman Crosse, a business partner of Samuel Thornton. He was a Fellow of the Society of Antiquaries of London, and Fellow of the Royal Society of Literature. He died at Hull on 20 October 1833, and was buried at St. James's Church, Sutton-on-Hull.

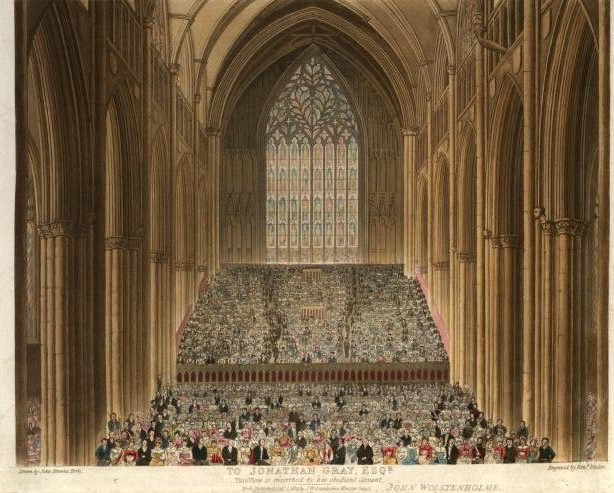
York Minster during the 1823 music festival, engraving by Edward Francis Finden.

In 1825, Crosse published An Account of the Grand Musical Festival, held in September, 1823, in the Cathedral Church of York. Besides recording details of that festival, it contained a history of the development of music festivals in England. A satirical reply, The York Musical Festival: A Dialogue, taking advantage of Crosse's bombastic style, was published by "Outis"; it has been attributed to the Reverend William Hett. Crosse also wrote on the Hull subscription library.
