= Crux (disambiguation) =

Crux or the Southern Cross is a constellation.

Crux may refer to:

== Arts and entertainment ==
=== Literature and publications ===
- Crux (literary), a passage whose correct reading is difficult to determine
- Crux (journal), a journal published by the Australian Student Christian Movement from 1961 to 1972
- "Crux", a poem by Patti Smith from her 1996 book The Coral Sea
- Crux (comics), 2001–2004, an American comic book published by CrossGen Entertainment
- Crux, a 2013 novel in The Nexus Trilogy by Ramez Naam
- Crux Mathematicorum, a journal published by the Canadian Mathematical Society
- Crux (book), 2026 novel by Gabriel Tallent

=== Music ===
- The Crux (band), a 2008 American band
- The Crux (Hurt album), 2012
- The Crux (Djo album), 2025

=== Other media ===
- Crux, a character in the 2001 anime television series Final Fantasy: Unlimited
- Eugene Solano, callsign Crux, Gryphus-1's air operator in the 2006 videogame Ace Combat X: Skies of Deception
- The Crux, an armed fleet in the 2020 role-playing game Genshin Impact
- Crux (online newspaper), a 2014 news website focusing on Catholic news
- CRUX (YouTube), an Indian online news channel owned by the Network18 Group

== Science and technology ==
- Crux (insect), a genus of cave wētā found in New Zealand
- Crux cordis or crux of the heart, an area of the heart
- CRUX, a Linux distribution
- "Crux", a theme in the 2002 GNOME 2 desktop environment

== Other uses ==
- Cross (Latin: crux)
- Crux (climbing), the most difficult section of a climbing or mountaineering route
- Yamaha Crux, a motorcycle manufactured by India Yamaha Motor

== See also ==
- Cross (disambiguation)
