= Téllez =

Téllez (meaning "son of Tello") is a surname of Spanish origin. It may refer to:

- Antonio Téllez, Spanish anarchist activist, journalist and historian
- Carmen Helena Téllez, Venezuelan-American music conductor
- Dora María Téllez, Nicaraguan historian and Sandinista activist
- Gabriel Téllez (Tirso de Molina), Spanish dramatist and poet
- Hernando Téllez, Colombian journalist and writer
- Lilly Téllez, Mexican journalist
- Luis Téllez, Mexican economist
- Norberto Téllez, Cuban athlete
- Óscar Téllez, Spanish footballer
- Pablo Tellez (born 1995), Colombian professional pickleball player
- Roseanne Tellez, American television reporter and anchor
- Rowdy Tellez, American baseball player
