= Cross Seamount =

Seamount far southwest of the Hawaii archipelago

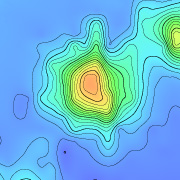
- Cross Seamount bathymetric.
- Cross Seamount bathymetric.
- Summit depth: 595 m (1,952 ft)
- Height: 4,300 m (14,108 ft)
- Summit area: volume: 1,796 km^{3} (431 cu mi)

Location
- Location: Southwest of the Hawaii archipelogo
- Group: small A1 Seamount
- Coordinates: 18°42′16″N 158°15′58″W
- Country: Hawaii

Geology
- Type: Underwater volcano (Seamount)
- Volcanic arc/chain: Hawaiian-Emperor seamount chain
- Age of rock: 102.8–103.3 Million years
- Last eruption: Pre-ancient times

Cross Seamount is a seamount far southwest of the Hawaii archipelago, about equidistant from the cities of Honolulu and Kona. It is one of the numerous seamounts surrounding Hawaii, although unrelated to the Hawaiian hotspot. It is notable for being one of the best studied of the numerous seamounts surrounding Hawaii, as it has been included in numerous biological surveys, most recently in 2007. It is also a site of offshore fishing, for its abundant tuna. The fishery management problems at Cross Seamount are typical of management problems in many fisheries, and its small size makes it a scientifically useful model for the analysis of fishery management.

== Geology ==
Cross Seamount, a landform arising from the ocean floor, is one of the more distant lesser seamounts surrounding the island of Hawaii. The NOAA has taken advantage of Cross Seamount’s position, and planted several weather buoys on the seamount. Very little is known about Cross Seamount's geology, as all of its studies as of March 2009 were of its ecology; however, it was mapped in 1996 by a four-year effort to map all of Hawaii's seafloor in detail.

== Biology ==
=== History of fishing ===
Cross Seamount is well known in fishery and scientific communities for its small but abundant biologic community. Longline fishing ships occasionally fished at Cross Seamount for many years prior to the development of handline fishing, in 1976. The level of fishing remained fairly constant up until the mid 1980. In the late 1980s, the amount of fishing activity at Cross Seamount more than quadrupled; however, it is hard to tell because of limited data.

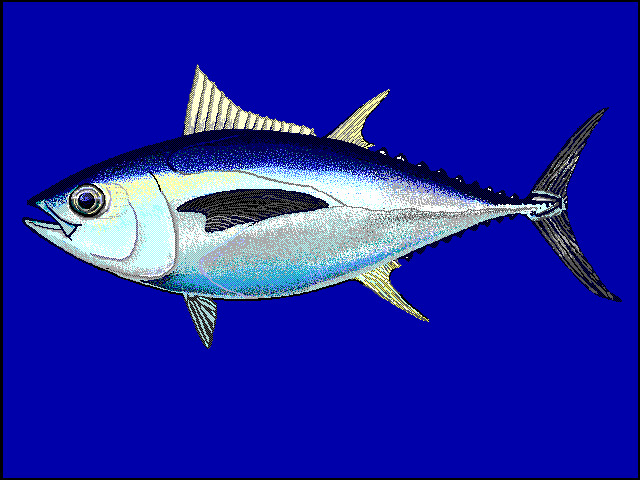
Bigeye tuna, one of Cross's two common fish species.

Local tuna populations belong to the same general stocks of tuna that are widely distributed throughout the Pacific. There are no accurate size data collected on the catches from fishing, aside from limited port sampling by the National Marine Fisheries Service. However, it is known that the largest percent of the catches are juvenile tuna between 10 and 35 pounds. These fish are probably somewhere between one and two years of age, well below sexual maturity. Fishermen report that the offshore fishing grounds are productive year-round. However, during summer months, large Yellowfin tuna are more abundant. The weight of the catches are estimated to be about 75% Thunnus obesus (Bigeye tuna), and 25% T. albacares (Yellowfin tuna). According to estimates, about 1 million pounds of Bigeye tuna and 400,000 pounds of Yellowfin were fished from offshore operations from the region in 1995. The amount of tuna is thought to depend on conditions on the seamount, and on the current process range of the tuna schools.

=== Concerns and studies ===
Reviews of the local catches have seemed to show no impact of the fishing operation on nearby tuna fishing. However, this is not very surprising, as fishery operations exist nearby with as much as 1000 times the activity. Nevertheless, as tuna spawn locally, there are concerns that the fishing eats away at the juvenile tuna population, which has the potential to seriously hurt fish numbers.

==== 1995 tagging project ====
In 1995, a project to tag the local fish, to analyze the population, was implemented by the NOAA, based on a plan proposed by fishermen in 1992. The first fish were tagged and released in August 1995. The objectives of the project was to investigate the retention rates of tuna on the Cross Seamount, movement patterns of tuna in relation to the fishery patterns, and the interaction between surface and longline fishing.

Capture Rates
| | | Bigeye | | Yellowfin | |
| | | OTC | Non-OTC | OTC | Non-OTC |
|---|---|---|---|---|---|
| Location | Cross Seamount | 567 | 1360 | 1 | 867 |
| Location | Buoy 2 | 474 | 316 | 2 | 321 |
| Location | Buoy 3 | 0 | 428 | 0 | 85 |
| Location | Buoy 4 | 0 | 199 | 0 | 98 |
| Location | Other Buoy | 0 | 55 | 0 | 86 |
| Location | Total | 1041 | 2358 | 3 | 1457 |
| Location | SPP Total | 3399 | | 1460 | |
| Location | Grand Total | 4859 | | | |

Recovery Rates
| | | Bigeye | | Yellowfin | |
| | | OTC | Non-OTC | OTC | Non-OTC |
|---|---|---|---|---|---|
| Location | Cross Seamount | 44 | 33 | 0 | 86 |
| Location | Buoy 2 | 69 | 5 | 0 | 12 |
| Location | Buoy 4 | 1 | 2 | 0 | 5 |
| Location | Other Buoy | 0 | 6 | 0 | 4 |
| Location | Other | 2 | 4 | 1 | 8 |
| Location | Unknown | 2 | 8 | 0 | 2 |
| Location | Total | 118 | 58 | 1 | 117 |
| Location | SPP Total | 176 | | 118 | |
| Location | Grand Total | 294 | | | |

The recovery rate was found to be 5.2% for Yellowfins, and 8.1% for Bigeyes. The longest-distance recapture was a yellowfin tuna tagged on the Cross Seamount in November 1996 and recaptured off the coast of the Baja California peninsula in July 1997.

Overfishing (as in the rate of depletion) at the Cross seamount appeared to be quite high, causing concerns. However, as much of the population seems to originate elsewhere, this loss is most likely accounted for. Problems with fishery interaction were eliminated, as 90% of the recaptures were in the local area. However, it was not possible to create a model on the overfishing of juveniles, as there was insufficient data to predict this accurately.

==== HARP ====
Cross seamount hosts a High-frequency Autonomous Acoustic Recording Package (HARP), installed on its summit by the NOAA in April 2005. The purpose of the HARP is to monitor cetaceans that near the seamount, and ultimately to develop ways to work with the marine mammal population using acoustic data. The unit undergoes routine maintenance, and its data is retrieved and analyzed every so often by an NOAA ship.

==== NOAA cruises ====
Cross Seamount was cruised by the NOAA in 2006, 2007, and 2008.

On November 2, 2006, scientists on the NOAA Ship Oscar Elton Sette, led by chief scientist Michael Musyl, conducted an array of biological experiments off of Kona coast and Cross Seamount. Their goal was to investigate and find ways to reduce the impacts of fishing and improve knowledge of the distribution of tunas, and how they are impacted by fishing activity. It also performed routine maintenance on the HARP.

On April 21, 2007, another cruise embarked for Cross Seamount. This cruise's goal, led by Reka Domokos and again on the Oscar Elton Settle, was to test and develop new methods for estimating fish populations using bioacoustics, specifically that of the bigeye tuna. The study was also keyed to try to determine the relationship between seamounts and the local fish population.

On April 15, 2008, another cruise embarked, to study the bigeye tuna population and their migratory patterns. The researchers, again on the ship Oscar Elton Sette, investigated the seamount waters, measuring the number of bigeye tuna and the prey species that frequent the area.
