= Gold Cross =

Gold Cross or Golden Cross may refer to:

== Awards ==
- Army Gold Cross, British Army award of the Napoleonic wars
- German awards:
  - German Cross in Gold, a Nazi Germany military award
  - Cross of Honor of the German Mother, a Nazi Germany civilian award
  - Spanish Cross in Gold, a Nazi Germany award given to certain Germans who participated in the Spanish Civil War
  - One of the grades of the Badge of Honour of the Armed Forces (Bundeswehr), a German Federal Republic award
- One of the classes of the Greek Order of the Redeemer
- Gold Cross (Philippines), a decoration of the Armed Forces of the Philippines
- Polish awards:
  - Cross of Merit (Poland) (Golden Cross of Merit), a Polish award instituted in 1923
  - Cross of Merit with Swords (Gold Cross of Merit with Swords), a Polish military award instituted in 1942

== Places in the United Kingdom ==
- Golden Cross, Herstmonceux, East Sussex, a hamlet in the Pevensey Levels
- Golden Cross, East Sussex, a small village in Chiddingly parish
- Monkland and Stretford, Herefordshire, an electoral ward and crossroads

== Buildings in the United Kingdom ==
- Golden Cross, Cardiff, a public house
- Golden Cross, Coventry, a public house
- Golden Cross, Oxford, a shopping arcade
- Golden Cross, Shrewsbury, a public house

== Other uses ==
- Golden cross in technical analysis of financial securities, a particular, considered bullish, signal
- Golden Cross mine, New Zealand
- Golden Cross (TV series), 2014 South Korean TV series
- Cicindela aurofasciata, a species of tiger beetle, sometimes called the 'gold cross'

== See also ==
- Cross of Gold speech
