= Yellow Cross =

Yellow Cross may refer to:

- Cathar yellow cross, a distinguishing mark worn by repentant Cathars, who were ordered to wear it by the Roman Catholic Church
- Yellow Cross (chemical warfare), a World War I chemical warfare agent
  - Yellow cross liquid or mustard gas

== See also ==
- Yellowcress, a family of plants
