= Blue Cross =

Blue Cross may refer to:

== Human healthcare ==
- Blue Cross Blue Shield Association, a federation of health insurance providers in the United States
- Canadian Association of Blue Cross Plans, a federation of health insurance providers in Canada
- International Federation of the Blue Cross, a Christian organization engaged in the prevention, treatment and aftercare of problems related to alcohol and other drugs

== Charities for animal healthcare and welfare ==
- Blue Cross (animal charity), an animal charity in the United Kingdom
- Irish Blue Cross, an animal charity in Ireland
- Blue Cross of India, an animal charity in India
- Blue Cross Zimbabwe, an organization associated with the Zimbabwe Society for the Prevention of Cruelty to Animals

== Buildings ==
- Blue Cross Blue Shield Tower, a building located in Chicago, Illinois, home to the headquarters of Health Care Service Corporation
- Blue Cross Centre, an office building located in the central business district of Moncton, New Brunswick
- Blue Cross Arena, a multi-purpose indoor arena, located in Rochester, New York

== Other uses ==
- Blue Cross (chemical warfare), a World War I chemical warfare agent
- "The Blue Cross" (short story), a short story by G. K. Chesterton
- Blue Cross (society), a Finnish Nazi organisation
- "Blue Cross", a song by P-MODEL from Potpourri

== See also ==
- Cruz Azul, a soccer club in Mexico
- Modrý kríž, a Christian teetotalers' society founded in Slovakia at the end of the 19th century
