= Bronze Cross =

Bronze Cross may refer to:

- Bronze Cross (Canada) a certification of the Royal Life Saving Society of Canada
- Bronze Cross (Netherlands), of the Netherlands
- Bronze Cross (Philippines), of the Philippines
- Bronze Cross (Scouting), an award of The Scout Association
- Bronze Cross of Rhodesia
- Bronze Cross of Zimbabwe
