= White Cross =

White Cross or Whitecross may refer to:

== Places ==
=== In England ===
- Bewsey and Whitecross, a ward in Warrington
- Whitecross (Blisland), a location near Blisland, Cornwall
- White Cross, Cornwall, a village near St Columb Major, Cornwall
  - POW Camp 115, Whitecross, St Columb Major
- Whitecross (Crowlas), a hamlet near Crowlas, Cornwall
- White Cross, Herefordshire, a suburb of Hereford
  - Whitecross Hereford High School
- White Cross, High Littleton, a hamlet in Somerset
- Whitecross (Lanteglos), a hamlet near Lanteglos Highway, Cornwall
- White Cross, Somerset, a United Kingdom location in Brent Knoll parish
- Whitecross, Somerset, a United Kingdom location in Drayton parish
- Whitecross (St Breock), a hamlet near St Breock, Cornwall
- Whitecross Street, London
- White Cross, Wiltshire, a hamlet in Zeals parish

=== Elsewhere ===
- Whitecross, County Armagh, a village in the Newry and Mourne District Council area of Northern Ireland
- Whitecross, County Meath, part of Julianstown/Whitecross, Ireland
- Whitecross, Falkirk, a village in Scotland
- White Cross–Huntley Hall, a historic home in Charlottesville, Virginia

== People with the surname ==
- Andrew Whitecross (born 1963), Australian politician for the Labor Party
- Brendan Whitecross (born 1990), Australian rules football player for Hawthorn
- Greg Whitecross (born 1961), Australian tennis player
- Mat Whitecross (born 1977), English film director and editor

== Other uses ==
- White Cross, Richmond, a pub in Richmond, London
- Whitecross (band), an American Christian metal band
- White Cross (brand) Early 20th century brand of electric appliances.
  - Whitecross (album), 1987 Whitecross album
- White Cross (chemical warfare), a tear gas agent
- The White Cross Army, a late-nineteenth-century "social purity" movement
- Irish White Cross, a relief organisation, active 1921–1928
- La Cruz Blanca (The Neutral White Cross), a Mexican volunteer nursing service founded in 1911
- Athcarne Cross or White Cross, a stone wayside cross in Ireland
- The first step of the CFOP method
