= HMS Prince George (1895) =

Pre-dreadnought battleship of the British Royal Navy

Coordinates: 52°44′5″N 4°38′23″E

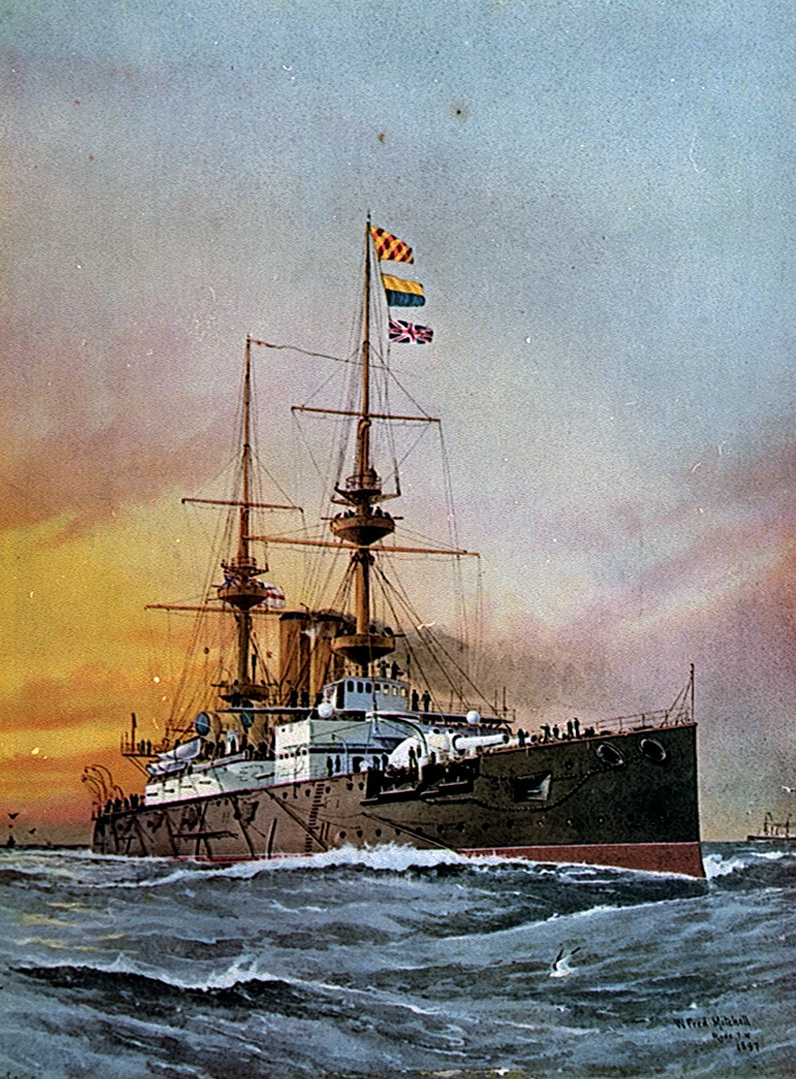
- HMS Prince George, painting by William Frederick Mitchell, 1897

History

United Kingdom
- Name: HMS Prince George
- Namesake: Prince George, the future King George V
- Builder: Portsmouth Dockyard
- Laid down: 10 September 1894
- Launched: 22 August 1895
- Christened: Duchess of York
- Commissioned: 26 November 1896
- Decommissioned: 21 February 1920
- Renamed: HMS Victorious II in July or September 1918; name reverted to Prince George in February 1919
- Fate: Sold for scrapping 22 September 1921; Wrecked 30 December 1921

General characteristics
- Class & type: Majestic-class pre-dreadnought battleship
- Displacement: 16,060 long tons (16,320 t)
- Length: 421 ft (128 m)
- Beam: 75 ft (23 m)
- Draught: 27 ft (8.2 m)
- Installed power: 8 × Scotch marine boilers; 10,000 ihp (7,500 kW)
- Propulsion: 2 × triple-expansion steam engines; 2 × screw propellers
- Speed: 16 kn (30 km/h; 18 mph)
- Complement: 672
- Armament: 4 × BL 12 in (305 mm) guns; 12 × QF 6 in (152 mm) guns; 16 × 12 pounder (76 mm) guns; 12 × 3 pounder (47 mm) quick-firing guns; 5 × 18 in (457 mm) torpedo tubes
- Armour: Belt armour: 9 in (229 mm); Deck: 2.5 to 4.5 in (64 to 114 mm); Barbettes: 14 in (356 mm); Conning tower: 14 inches

HMS Prince George was a Majestic-class pre-dreadnought battleship launched in 1895. She was named after the future George V of the United Kingdom and was the fourth and final ship to bear that name. Commissioned in 1896, she initially served with the Channel Fleet until 1904. She was involved in a collision with her sister ship, Hannibal, and the resulting damage meant that much of the latter part of 1903 was spent being repaired. After a refit in 1904, she was assigned to the Atlantic Fleet and then from 1907, she was part of the Home Fleet. In 1912, she was assigned to the 7th Battle Squadron.

When the First World War broke out Prince George, together with the rest of the squadron, was attached to the Channel Fleet during the early stages of the war. In early 1915, she was dispatched to the Mediterranean for service in the Dardanelles campaign. She participated in bombardments of Turkish forts and supported the Allied operations at Gallipoli, including the evacuation from the peninsula late in 1915. She spent the remainder of the war back in the United Kingdom, initially as an accommodation ship before being converted to a depot ship for destroyers in 1918 and stationed at Scapa Flow. For this latter role, she was renamed Victorious II before reverting to her original name in 1919. Decommissioned in 1920, she was sold for scrapping to a German company but sank off the Netherlands during transit to Germany.

== Design ==
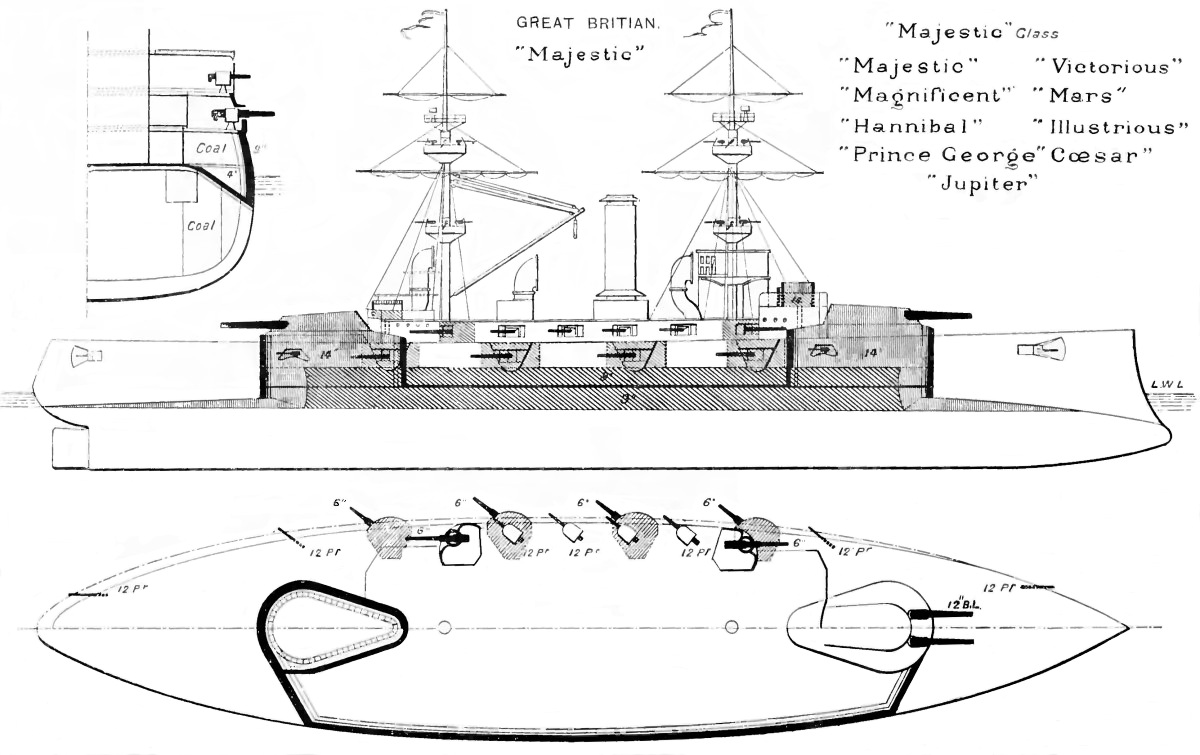
Right elevation, deck plan, and hull section as depicted in Brassey's Naval Annual 1902

Prince George was 421 feet (128 m) long overall and had a beam of 75 ft (23 m) and a draft of 27 ft (8.2 m). She displaced up to 16,060 long tons (16,320 t) at full load. Her propulsion system consisted of two 3-cylinder triple-expansion steam engines powered by eight coal-fired, cylindrical fire-tube Scotch marine boilers. By 1907–1908, she was re-boilered with oil-fired models. Her engines provided a top speed of 16 knots (30 km/h; 18 mph) at 10,000 indicated horsepower (7,500 kW). The Majestics were considered good seaboats with an easy roll and good steamers, although they suffered from high fuel consumption. She had a crew of 672 officers and ratings.

Prince George was armed with a main battery of four BL 12-inch (305 mm) Mk VIII guns in twin-gun turrets, one forward and one aft. The turrets were placed on pear-shaped barbettes; six of her sisters had the same arrangement, but her sisters Caesar and Illustrious and all future British battleship classes had circular barbettes. Prince George also carried a secondary battery of twelve QF 6-inch (152 mm) /40 guns. They were mounted in casemates in two gun decks amidships. She also carried sixteen QF 12-pounder guns and twelve QF 2-pounder guns for defence against torpedo boats. She was also equipped with five 18 in (457 mm) torpedo tubes, four of which were submerged in the ship's hull, with the last in a deck-mounted launcher.

Prince George and the other ships of her class had 9 inches (229 mm) of Harvey steel in their belt armour, which allowed equal protection with less cost in weight compared to previous types of armour. This allowed Prince George and her sisters to have a deeper and lighter belt than previous battleships without any loss in protection. The barbettes for the main battery were protected with 14 in (356 mm) of armour, and the conning tower had the same thickness of steel on the sides. The ship's armoured deck was 2.5 to 4.5 in (64 to 114 mm) thick.

== Operational history ==
=== Pre-World War I ===
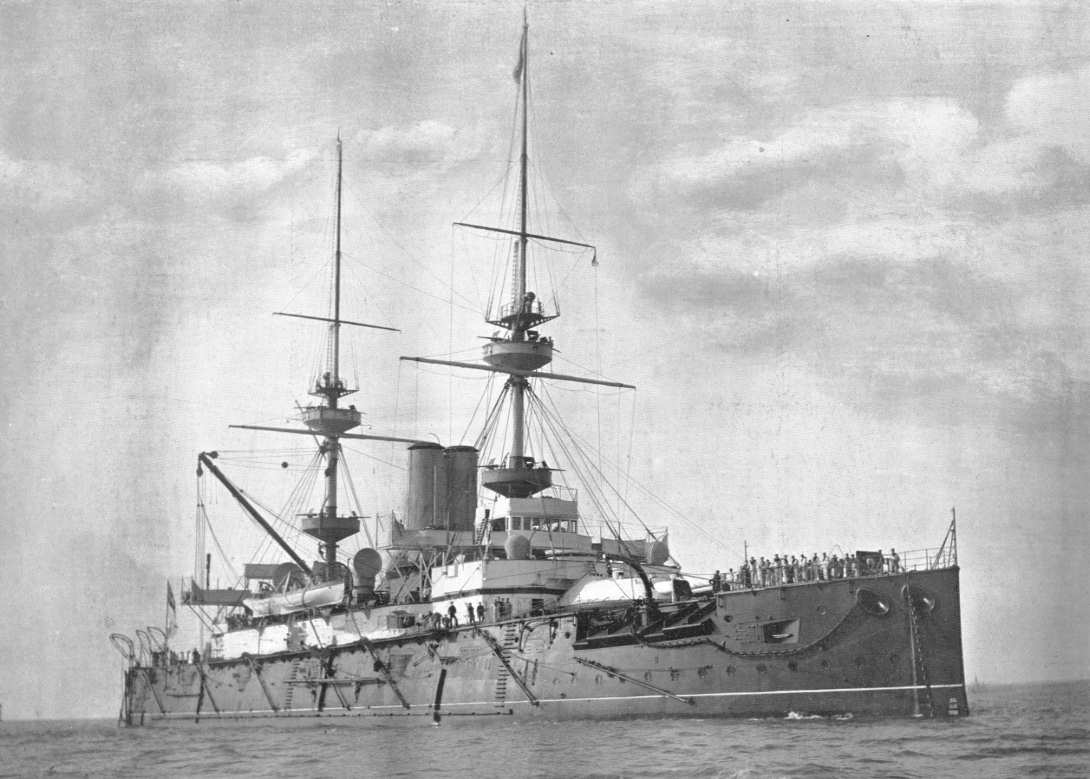
Prince George, c. 1897

Prince George was laid down at the Portsmouth Dockyard on 10 September 1894. She was launched less than a year later, on 22 August 1895, after which fitting-out work commenced. The ceremony was performed by the Duchess of York (later Queen Mary), in the presence of her husband Prince George, Duke of York (later King George V), for whom the ship was named. She was commissioned into the Royal Navy on 26 November 1896, to serve with the Channel Fleet. She was present at both the Fleet Review at Spithead for the Diamond Jubilee of Queen Victoria on 26 June 1897. Captain Arthur Barrow was appointed in command on 28 June 1899, and was succeeded by Captain Arthur Calvert Clarke in November 1901. She was present at the Coronation Fleet Review for King Edward VII on 16 August 1902, and the following month visited the Aegean Sea for combined manoeuvres with the Channel and Mediterranean fleets. In late October she visited Gibraltar and Tetuan with HMS Magnificent.

On 17 October 1903, Prince George was badly damaged when her sister ship Hannibal rammed her in heavy seas at a speed of 9 knots (17 km/h; 10 mph) off Spain, punching a large hole below the waterline on Prince George's starboard quarter. Prince George was in danger of sinking for several hours, but managed to make it to Ferrol, steering with her engines and with her sternwalk awash. After temporary repairs at Ferrol, she departed on 24 October 1903 for Portsmouth, where her repairs were completed.

Prince George ended her Channel Fleet service in July 1904, and began a refit at Portsmouth. Upon its completion, she was commissioned into the reserve there on 3 January 1905. On 14 February 1905, she was commissioned for service with the Atlantic Fleet, which had been the Channel Fleet until a fleet reorganisation on 1 January 1905. On 3 March 1905 she collided with the German armoured cruiser SMS Friedrich Carl at Gibraltar without serious damage. On 17 July 1905, Prince George was transferred to the new Channel Fleet, ending this service on 4 March 1907 when she was paid off at Portsmouth.

Prince George was recommissioned on 5 March 1907 to serve as the flagship of the Commander-in-Chief, Portsmouth Division of the new Home Fleet which had been organised in January 1907. On 5 December 1907 she collided with the armoured cruiser Shannon at Portsmouth, sustaining significant damage to her deck plating and boat davits. (Note: According to Conway's All the World's Fighting Ships 1906–1921, this collision occurred in December 1909. See Preston, p. 7.) She was relieved as flagship in February 1909, and from March to December she underwent a refit at Portsmouth, during which she had radio installed. Prince George was reduced to a nucleus crew and placed in the commissioned reserve in December 1910. She moved to Devonport in 1911. In June 1912, Prince George became part of the 7th Battle Squadron, 3rd Fleet.

=== First World War ===
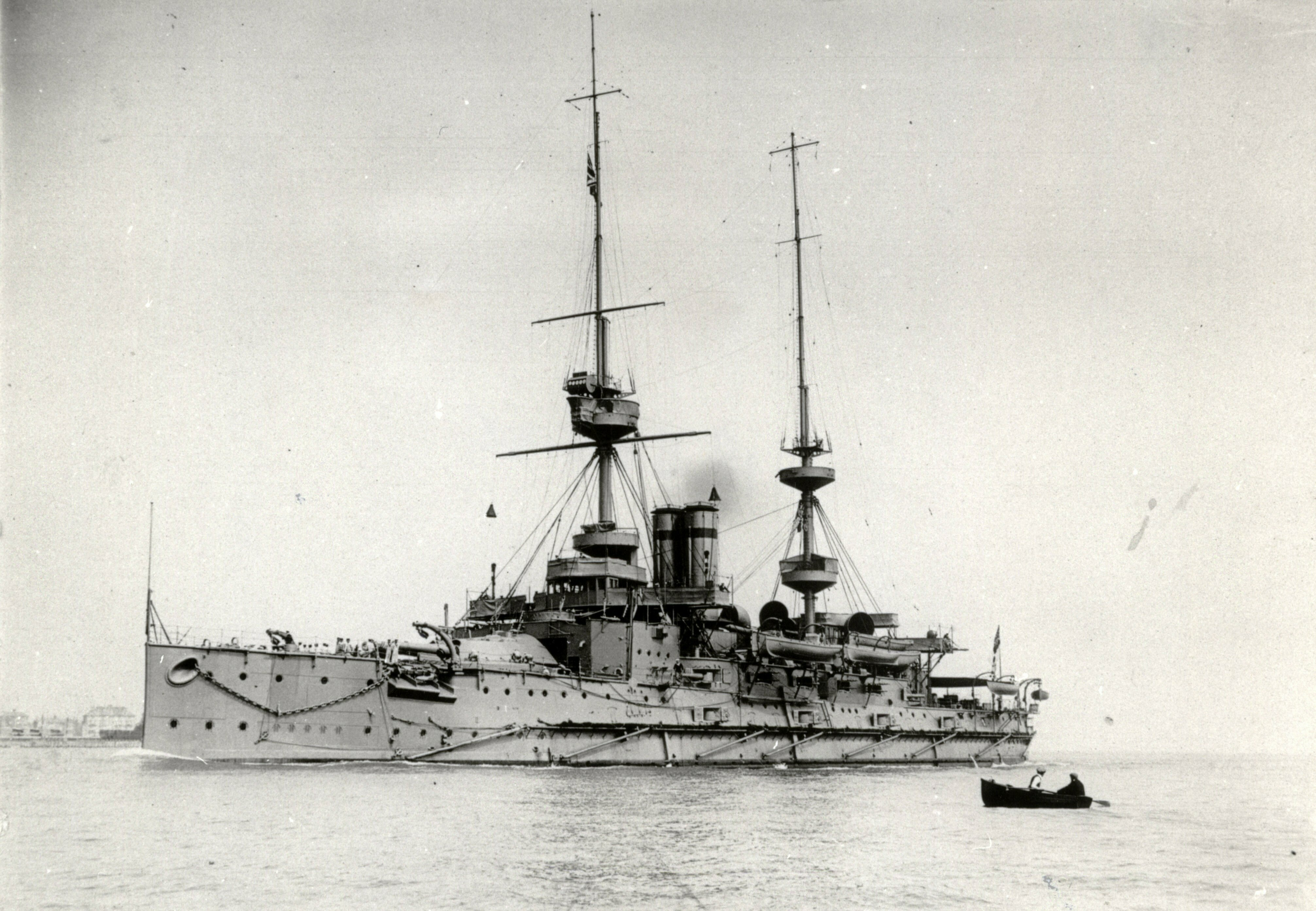
Prince George after her 1904 refit.

Upon the outbreak of the First World War in August 1914, Prince George returned to full commission on 8 August, and briefly was the squadron's first flagship, until relieved in this role by the battleship Vengeance on 15 August. On 25 August, Prince George covered the passage of the Plymouth Marine Division to Ostend, Belgium, and in September she covered the movement of the British Expeditionary Force from England to France. Prince George's Channel Fleet service ended in February 1915 when she transferred to the Dardanelles for service in the Dardanelles campaign as a "mine-bumper". She arrived at Tenedos on 1 March 1915, which would be her base until February 1916. She took part in attacks on Ottoman forts covering the Turkish Straits on 5 and 18 March. On 3 May, while firing on Turkish batteries, she took a 6-inch (152-mm) hit below the waterline, and returned to Malta for repairs.

Prince George was back in action on 12 and 13 July, supporting French troops with gunfire support from off of Krithia and Achi Baba. On 18 and 19 December she covered the evacuation of Allied troops from Suvla Bay, and the evacuation from West Beach on 8 and 9 January 1916; she was hit by a torpedo off Cape Helles on 9 January, but it failed to explode and she suffered no damage. She was at Salonika in January and February. Prince George left the Mediterranean at the end of February and paid off at Chatham Dockyard in March to provide crews for antisubmarine vessels. She remained at Chatham in a care and maintenance status through February 1918, serving as an auxiliary sickbay and in other subsidiary duties, then served as an accommodation ship there from March 1916 to May 1918.

In May 1918, Prince George began a refit at Chatham for conversion to a destroyer depot ship. She was renamed Victorious II in September 1918, (Note: Conway's All the World's Fighting Ships 1906–1921 puts the name change in July 1918. See Preston, p. 7.) and emerged from refit in October 1918. She was then attached to repair ship (her sister ship and former battleship) Victorious at Scapa Flow, where she served as a depot ship to destroyers of the Grand Fleet. She reverted to the name Prince George in February 1919, and in March transferred to Sheerness to serve as depot ship to destroyers based on the Medway. Prince George was placed on the disposal list at Sheerness on 21 February 1920, and was sold for scrapping to a British firm on 22 September 1921. She was resold to a German firm in December 1921, and departed for Germany for scrapping. During the voyage, Prince George was wrecked on 30 December 1921 off Camperduin, the Netherlands. She subsequently was stripped of valuable materials and left as a breakwater, remaining there to this day. In 2014 she was buried in sand as part of a beach expansion program. A marker rests above where the wreck lies.
