= Majestic-class battleship =

Pre-dreadnought battleship class of the British Royal Navy

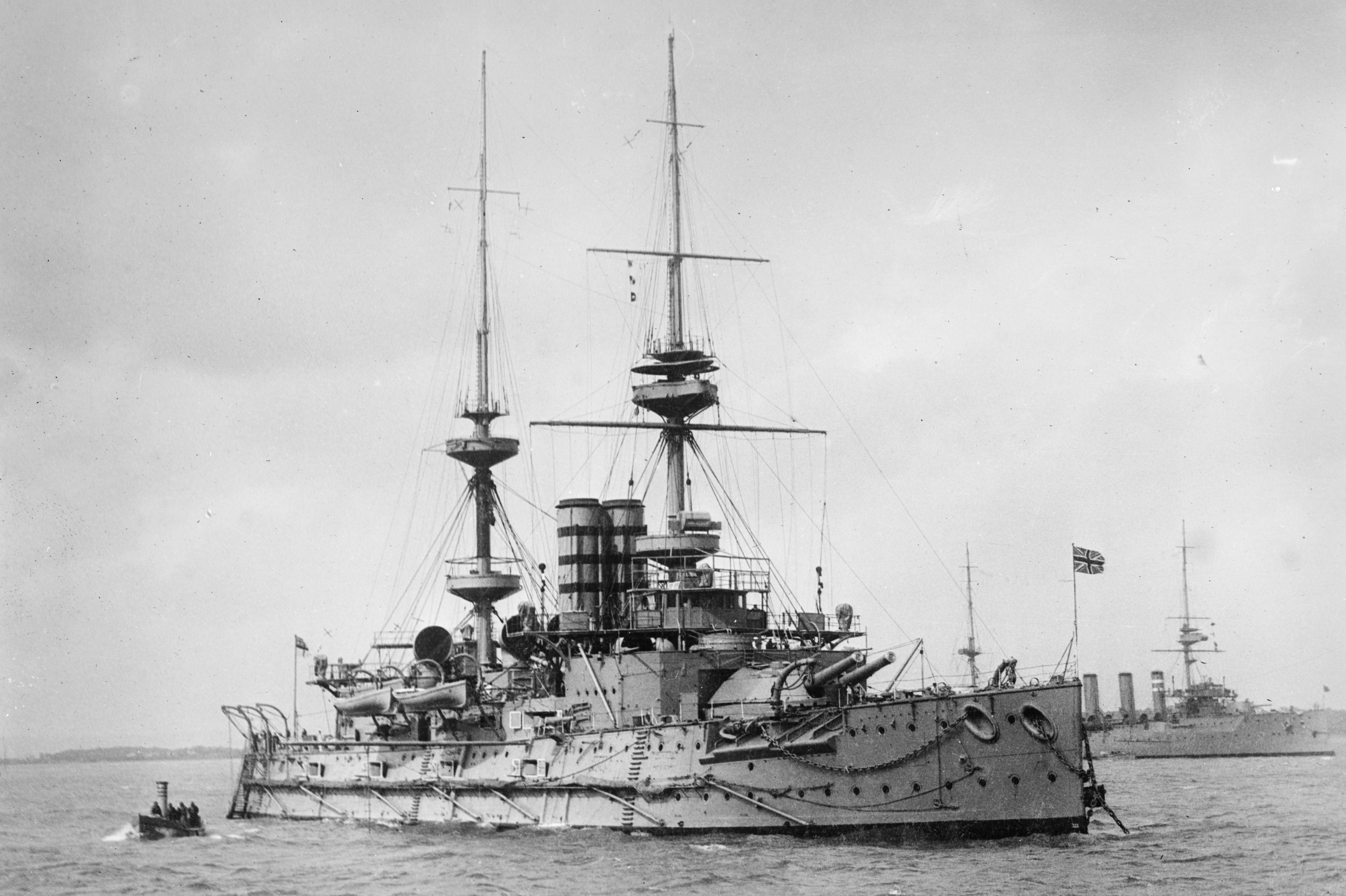
- HMS Mars

Class overview
- Name: Majestic-class battleship
- Builders: Laird Brothers, Birkenhead; J & G Thomson, Clydebank; Chatham Dockyard; Pembroke Dockyard; Portsmouth Dockyard
- Operators: Royal Navy
- Preceded by: HMS Renown
- Succeeded by: Canopus class
- Built: 1893–1898
- In commission: December 1895 – November 1921
- Completed: 9
- Lost: 1
- Retired: 8

General characteristics
- Type: Pre-dreadnought battleship
- Displacement: 16,060 long tons (16,320 t)
- Length: 421 ft (128 m)
- Beam: 75 ft (23 m)
- Draught: 27 ft (8.2 m)
- Installed power: 8 × Scotch marine boilers; 10,000 ihp (7,500 kW)
- Propulsion: 2 × triple-expansion steam engines; 2 × screw propellers
- Speed: 16 kn (30 km/h; 18 mph)
- Complement: 672
- Armament: 4 × BL 12-inch (305 mm) Mk VIII guns; 12 × QF 6-inch (152 mm) guns; 16 × 12-pounder (76-mm) guns; 12 × 3-pounder (47-mm) quick-firing guns; 5 × 18-inch (450-mm) torpedo tubes
- Armour: Belt armour: 9 in (229 mm); Deck: 2.5 to 4.5 in (64 to 114 mm); Barbettes: 14 in (356 mm); Conning tower: 14 inches

The Majestic class of nine pre-dreadnought battleships were built for the Royal Navy in the mid-1890s under the Spencer Programme, named after the First Lord of the Admiralty, John Poyntz Spencer. With nine units commissioned, they were the most numerous class of battleships. The nine ships, HMS Majestic, Caesar, Hannibal, Illustrious, Jupiter, Magnificent, Mars, Prince George, and Victorious, were built between 1894 and 1898 as part of a programme to strengthen the Royal Navy versus its two traditional rivals, France and Russia. This continued the naval re-armament initiatives begun by the Naval Defence Act 1889.

The Majestics introduced a number of significant improvements to British battleship design, including armoured gun shields for the barbette-mounted main battery guns. The ships were armed with a main battery of four BL 12-inch Mark VIII guns, the first large-calibre weapon in the Royal Navy to use smokeless propellant, which made it superior in almost all respects to earlier, larger guns. They were also the first British ships to incorporate Harvey armour, which allowed them to carry a much more comprehensive level of protection. The ships proved to be among the most successful designs of their day, and they were widely copied in foreign navies, including the Japanese Shikishima class and the battleship Mikasa, which were both modified versions of the Majestic design.

The nine ships served in a variety of roles throughout their careers. They primarily served in the Channel Fleet, though several took rotations in the Mediterranean Fleet, and Victorious served on the China Station in 1900–02. No longer frontline ships by the outbreak of the First World War in July 1914, the vessels were used to protect the crossing of the British Expeditionary Force and various points on the British coast. In 1915, several of the ships were disarmed, their guns going to equip the Lord Clive-class monitors. The disarmed battleships were used as troop ships during the Dardanelles Campaign, and Prince George and Majestic were used to bombard enemy positions before Majestic was torpedoed by a German U-boat. The surviving ships were employed in secondary roles from 1915 onwards, and after the war, all were sold for scrapping in 1920–22. Only one, Prince George, avoided the breakers' yards by wrecking off Camperduin.

== Design ==
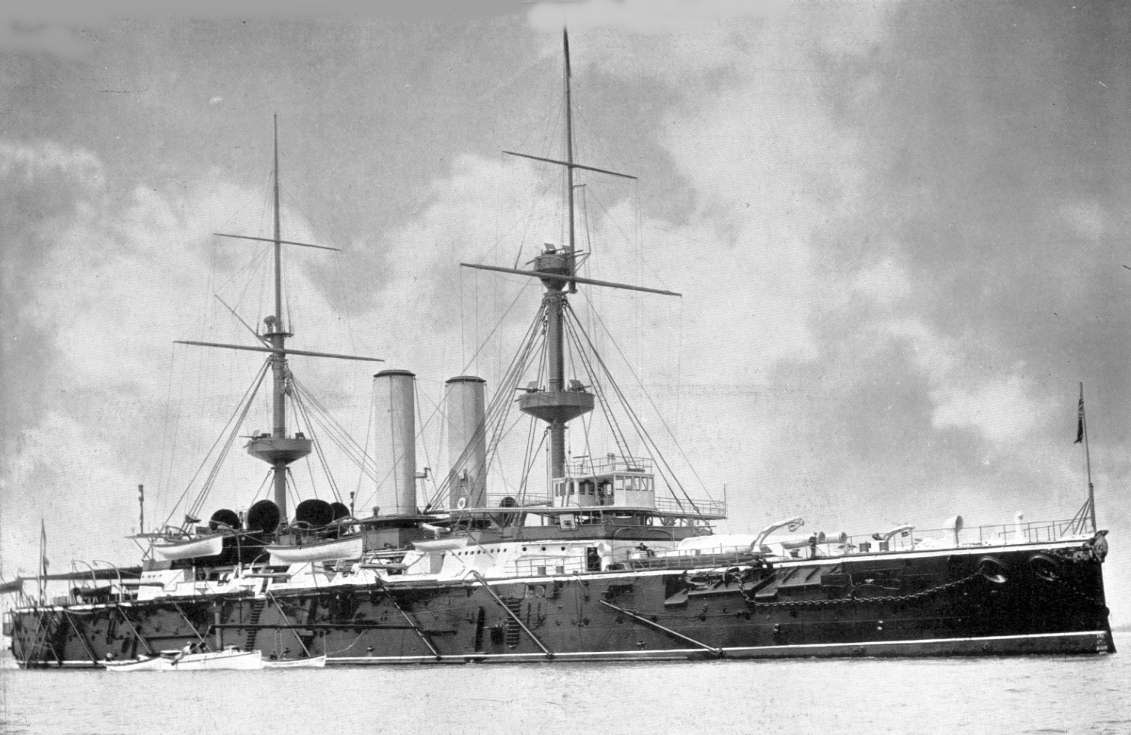
HMS Royal Sovereign, upon which the design for the Majestic class was based

In 1891, Rear Admiral Jackie Fisher, then the Controller of the Royal Navy, issued a request for a new battleship design based on the Royal Sovereign class, but that incorporated a recently designed 12 in (305 mm) gun and Harvey armour, which was significantly stronger than compound armour. The Director of Naval Construction, William Henry White, prepared a preliminary design for a 12,500-long-ton (12,700 t) ship armed with four of the 12 in guns and protected with an armour belt that was 9 inches (229 mm) thick. White submitted the design on 27 January 1892 to the Board. Due to the greater resilience that Harvey armour provided, less of it could be used for the same level of protection, allowing for significant weight reduction. As a result, the protection scheme was made stronger and more comprehensive than in the Royal Sovereigns, while minimising increased displacement. This included the fitting of fully enclosed armoured gun shields for the main battery guns.

The Board approved the design and intended to lay down three ships under the 1892 programme, but work on the 12 in gun was taking longer than predicted, and so construction was delayed to the 1893 programme. By that time, the third ship of what was to be the Majestic class was redesigned as a second-class battleship, Renown, leaving only two ships to be laid down under the 1893 estimates. By August 1893, however, the public perceived the strength of the Royal Navy to have fallen relative to its traditional rivals, the French and Russian navies. John Spencer, the First Lord of the Admiralty, proposed a large naval expansion plan referred to as the Spencer Programme that included seven more Majestic-class battleships to soothe public opinion.

The Majestics were to be a benchmark for all successor pre-dreadnoughts. While the preceding Royal Sovereign-class battleships had revolutionised and stabilised British battleship design by introducing the high-freeboard battleship with four main-battery guns in twin mountings in barbettes fore and aft, it was the Majestics that settled on the 12 in main battery and began the practice of mounting armoured gunhouses over the barbettes; these gunhouses, although very different from the old-style, heavy, circular gun turrets that preceded them, would themselves become known as "turrets" and became the standard on warships worldwide. The Majestic class, the largest class of battleships ever built, were some of the most successful battleships of their time, and they were widely copied. Indeed, the Japanese Shikishima class and the battleship Mikasa were based directly on the Majestics.

=== General characteristics and machinery ===
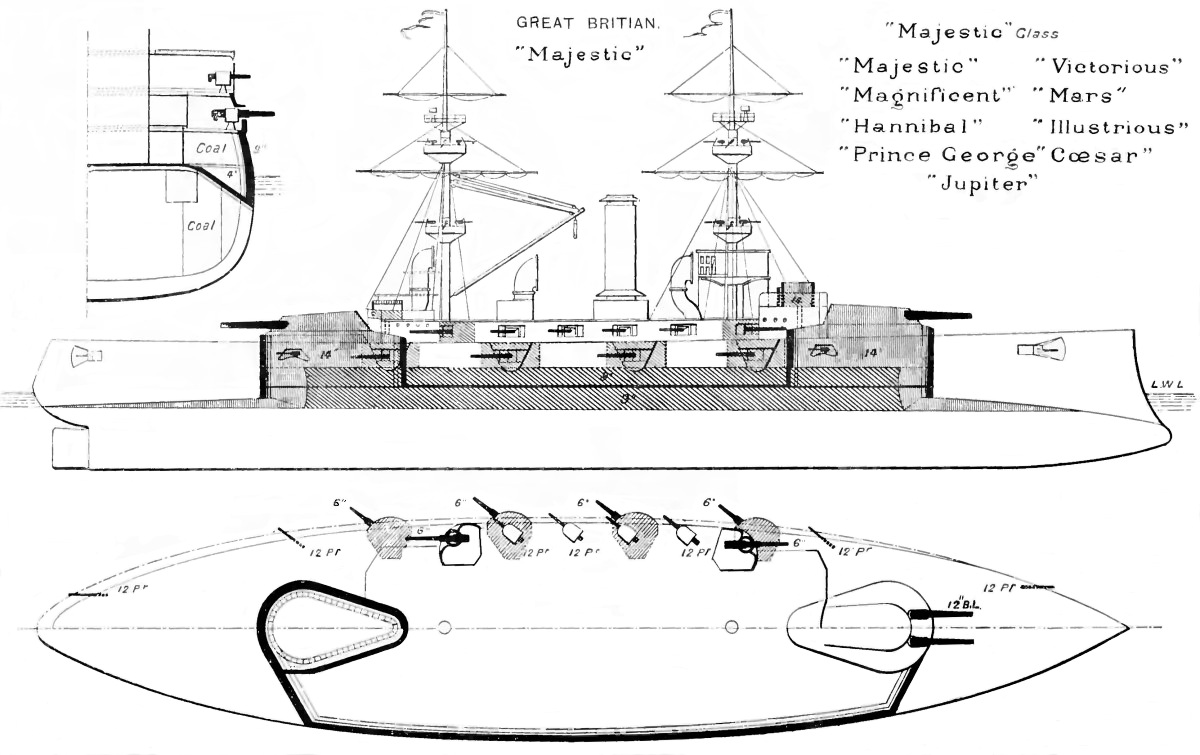
Right elevation, deck plan, and hull section as depicted in Brassey's Naval Annual 1902; the shaded areas represent the ship's armour protection.

The Majestics were 390 feet (120 m) long between perpendiculars and 421 feet (128 m) long overall. They had a beam of 75 ft (23 m) and a draught of 27 ft (8.2 m). They displaced up to 16,060 long tons (16,320 t) at full combat load. The ships had a freeboard of 25 ft (7.6 m) forward, 17 ft 3 in (5.26 m) amidships, and 18 ft 6 in (5.64 m) aft. Their hulls were divided into numerous watertight compartments, with 72 compartments inside the armoured citadel and 78 outside it. A double bottom extended for much of the length of the hull. They were fitted with two pole masts, each with two fighting tops. Except for Caesar, Hannibal, and Illustrious, they had a new design in which the bridge was mounted around the base of the foremast behind the conning tower to prevent a battle-damaged bridge from collapsing around the tower.

The Majestics were considered good seaboats, in large part due to their high freeboard, with an easy roll and good steamers, although they suffered from high fuel consumption. They were nevertheless very manoeuvrable. They had a transverse metacentric height of 3.7 ft (1.1 m) at full load. The ships had a crew of 672–794 officers and ratings, and this number varied between ships and over the course of their careers. Each ship carried a variety of smaller boats, usually including three steam pinnaces, one 42-foot (13 m) steam launch, two 34 ft (10 m) cutters, two 27 ft (8.2 m) whalers, three gigs of between 24 and 32 ft (7.3 and 9.8 m), one 16 ft (4.9 m) skiff dinghy, and one 13 ft 6 in (4.11 m) raft. The ships were equipped with six 24-inch (610 mm) searchlights, with four on the bridge and one on each mast. All nine ships received Type I wireless transmitters in 1909–10.

During the sea trials for the preceding battleship Royal Sovereign, the ship's engineers learned that the engines might fail at high levels of forced draught; as a result, the Majestics were designed to reach the same maximum speed with a more powerful engine. This allowed the engineers a wider margin of safety at maximum speed. Their propulsion system consisted of two 3-cylinder triple expansion engines, each driving a single four-bladed screw. Steam was provided by eight coal-fired, single-ended Scotch marine boilers, which were trunked into a pair of funnels placed side by side. Their engines were rated at 10,000 indicated horsepower (7,500 kW) at normal draught, and they provided a top speed of 16 knots (30 km/h; 18 mph). At forced draught, they could reach 12,000 ihp (8,900 kW) and 17 knots (31 km/h; 20 mph). By 1908, the ships had been re-boilered with mixed coal- and oil-fired models. The ships carried 1,100 tonnes (1,100 long tons; 1,200 short tons) of coal normally, and additional spaces allowed for up to 1,900 tonnes (1,900 long tons; 2,100 short tons) to be stored. With the installation of the new boilers, oil storage amounting to 400 to 500 tonnes (390 to 490 long tons; 440 to 550 short tons) was added. At a speed of 10 knots (19 km/h; 12 mph), the ships could steam for 7,000 nautical miles (13,000 km; 8,100 mi). At 14.6 knots (27.0 km/h; 16.8 mph), their cruising radius fell to 4,420 nmi (8,190 km; 5,090 mi).

=== Armament ===
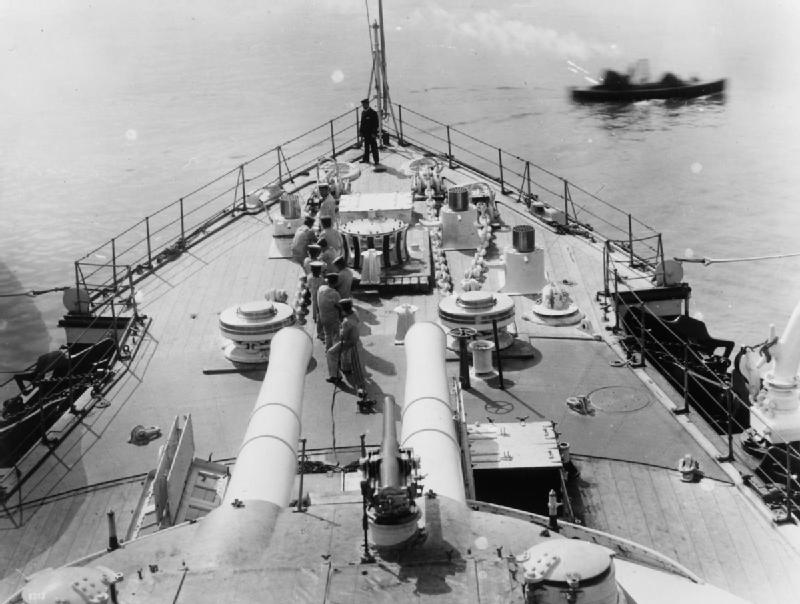
Majestic's forward 12 in gun turret; note the 12-pounder mounted atop the turret

Majestic and her sisters were armed with four BL 12-inch Mk VIII 35-calibre guns in twin-gun turrets, one forward and one aft. This calibre would become the standard for all British battleship classes built for the next fifteen years. They were the first new British battleships to mount a 12-inch main battery since the 1880s. The new gun was a significant improvement on the 13.5-inch (343 mm) gun which had been fitted on the Admiral and Royal Sovereign classes that preceded the Majestics, in terms of ballistics and strength of the gun itself, and it was significantly lighter. The 12 in gun had a muzzle velocity of 2,500 feet per second (760 m/s)—a significant increase over the 13.5 in gun owing to the use of smokeless propellant—and it could fire a 850-pound (390 kg) shell with a range of 13,900 yards (12,700 m).

The turrets were placed on pear-shaped barbettes; the first six ships had this arrangement, but the last two, Caesar and Illustrious, had circular barbettes. The BII mountings in the first six ships allowed all-around loading from the supply of ready ammunition kept in the turret, but the guns had to return to the centerline to bring ammunition up from the magazines, as the ammunition hoists did not rotate with the turret. Caesar and Illustrious, with their circular barbettes, had BIII mountings with rotating hoists, and these allowed all-around loading from the magazines. Both the BII and BIII mounts had a range of elevation from −5 degrees to 13.5 degrees, with the loading angle at maximum elevation. During the First World War, four of the Majestics were disarmed, and these guns were used to arm eight Lord Clive-class monitors. A further two turrets from Illustrious were later emplaced as coastal guns on the Tyne.

The saving in weight from the main battery allowed the Majestic class to carry a secondary battery of twelve QF (quick-firing) 6-inch 40-calibre guns, a larger secondary armament than in previous classes. These were mounted in casemates in two gun decks amidships, and they fired a 100-pound (45 kg) shell at a muzzle velocity of 2,205 ft/s (672 m/s). Elevated at 15 degrees, they could hit targets out to 10,000 yards (9,100 m). The ships also carried sixteen QF 12-pounder Mk I guns and twelve QF 2-pounder Mk I guns for defence against torpedo boats. These were placed in a variety of mounts, including in casemates, on the main battery turret roofs, and in the fighting tops. The ships were also equipped with five 18 in (450 mm) torpedo tubes, four of which were submerged in the ship's hull, with the last in a deck-mounted launcher in the stern. The Woolwich Arsenal manufactured the torpedoes, which were the Mark IV model; these carried a 200-pound (91 kg) warhead and had a range of 750 yards (690 m) at a speed of 27.5 knots (50.9 km/h; 31.6 mph).

=== Armour ===
The armoured belt on the Majestic class consisted of 9 inches (229 mm) of Harvey steel, which allowed equal protection with less cost in weight compared to previous types of armour. This allowed the ships to have a deeper and lighter belt than previous battleships without any loss in protection. The belt armour extended for 220 feet (67 m) along the hull; it covered 5 ft 6 in (1.68 m) above the waterline and 9 ft 6 in (2.90 m) below. The belt was connected, via the barbettes, by a 14 in (356 mm) thick transverse bulkhead forward and a 12 in thick bulkhead aft. The ship's armoured deck was 3 in (76 mm) thick on the central portion, with 4 in (102 mm) thick sloped sides that connected to the bottom edge of the belt armour. This arrangement required any shell that penetrated the belt to also pass through the deck before it could reach the ship's vitals. The deck was reduced to 2.5 in (64 mm) toward the bow and stern.

The barbettes for the main battery were protected with 14 in of armour on their exposed sides above the armoured deck, while the portion that was masked below the deck was reduced to 7 in (178 mm). The gunhouses for the main battery had 10 in (254 mm) thick faces, 5.5 in (140 mm) thick sides, 4 in (100 mm) rears, and 2 in (51 mm) thick roofs. The secondary guns' casemates were 6 in thick, with 2 in thick sides and rears to protect the gun crews from splinters. A mantlet that was 6 in thick covered the stern torpedo tube. The forward conning tower had 14 in of steel on the sides, except for the rear-facing side, which was reduced to 12 in. The aft conning tower had much thinner armour protection, with 3 in on all sides.

== Ships ==
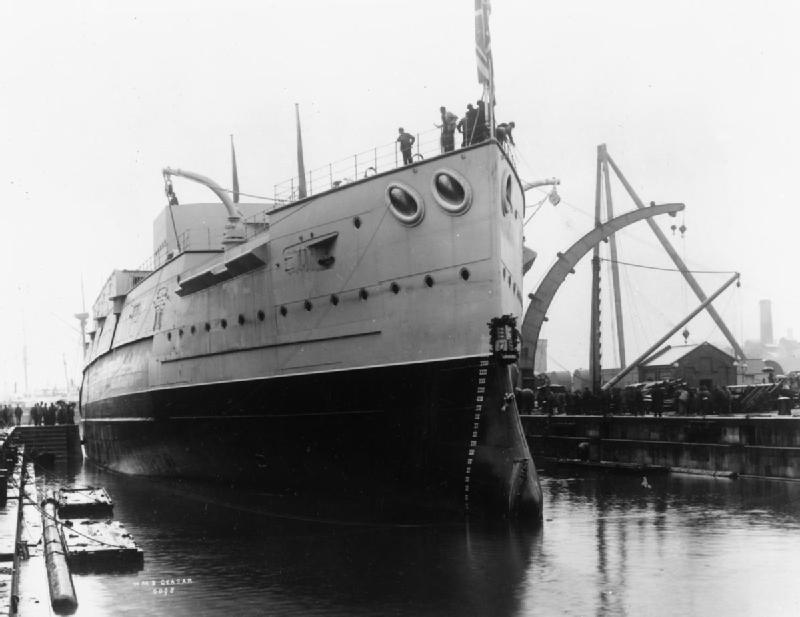
Caesar fitting out at Portsmouth

Construction data
Name	Builder	Laid down	Launched	Completed
Caesar	Portsmouth Dockyard	25 March 1895	2 September 1896	January 1898
Hannibal	Pembroke Dockyard	1 May 1894	28 April 1896	April 1898
Illustrious	Chatham Dockyard	11 March 1895	17 September 1896	April 1898
Jupiter	J & G Thomson, Clydebank	24 April 1894	18 November 1895	May 1897
Magnificent	Chatham Dockyard	18 December 1893	19 December 1894	December 1895
Majestic	Portsmouth Dockyard	February 1894	31 January 1895	December 1895
Mars	Laird Brothers	2 June 1894	30 March 1896	June 1897
Prince George	Portsmouth Dockyard	10 September 1894	22 August 1895	November 1896
Victorious	Chatham Dockyard	28 May 1894	19 October 1895	November 1896

== Service history ==
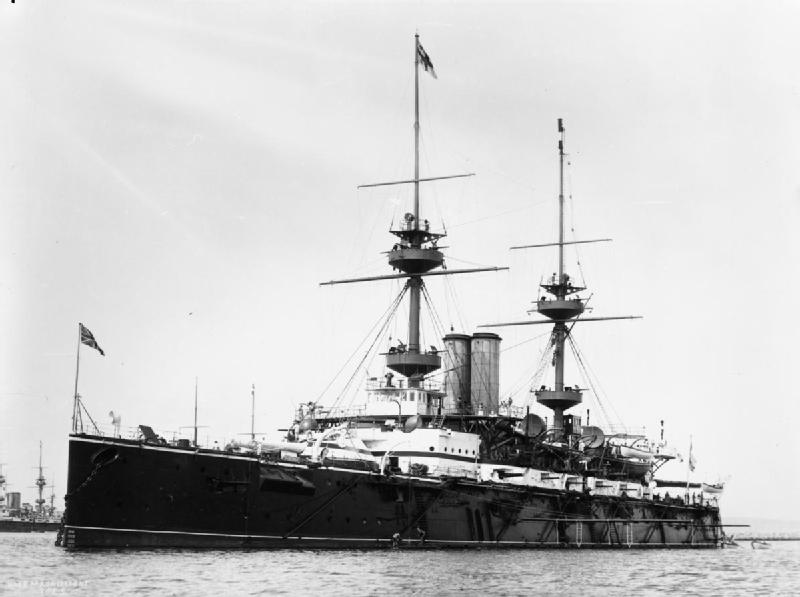
Magnificent in 1899

Majestic, Magnificent, Jupiter, Mars, Prince George, and Hannibal served in the Channel Fleet from their commissioning, with Magnificent as the flagship from 1895. They were present at the Diamond Jubilee for Queen Victoria in June 1897 and took part in the Coronation Review for King Edward VII in August 1902, along with Hannibal. Caesar and Illustrious instead went to the Mediterranean Fleet, remaining there until 1903 and 1904, respectively, when they returned to Britain to join their sisters in the Channel Fleet. Victorious served briefly in the Mediterranean Fleet in 1897 before being transferred to the China Station in 1898, remaining there until 1900. The ship then returned for another stint in the Mediterranean Fleet from 1900 to 1903, and in 1904 she joined her sisters in the Channel Fleet. In 1906, Majestic was paid off; the following year she and Magnificent were recommissioned into the Nore Division. At the same time, Caesar, Victorious, and Mars went to the Devonport Division, while Hannibal, Prince George, Jupiter, and Illustrious went to the Portsmouth Division.

In March 1912, Caesar was reduced to reserve in the 4th Squadron, Home Fleet. Later that year, Majestic, Prince George, and Illustrious were assigned to the 7th Battle Squadron (BS). Following Britain's entry into the First World War in August 1914, Caesar and Jupiter were assigned to the 7th BS, which was in turn assigned to the Channel Fleet and tasked with protecting the British Expeditionary Force as it crossed the English Channel to France. At the same time, Hannibal, Mars, Magnificent, and Victorious were assigned to the 9th Battle Squadron and stationed in the Humber to protect the British coast. Illustrious was instead used as a guard ship for the Grand Fleet, and was initially based at Loch Ewe.

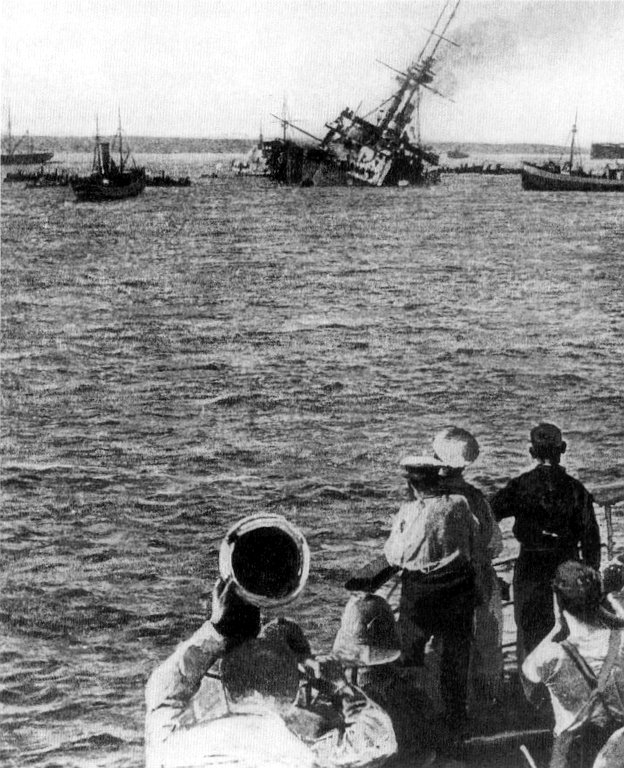
Majestic sinking off the Dardanelles, May 1915

In early 1915, Majestic and Prince George took part in the Dardanelles Campaign against the Ottoman Empire; they bombarded Ottoman positions around the Dardanelles until May, when Majestic was torpedoed and sunk by the German U-boat U-21 off Cape Helles. At around the same time, Prince George was hit by a shell from an Ottoman coastal battery, requiring repairs at Malta. Hannibal, Magnificent, Victorious, and Mars were laid up in early 1915 and had their 12 in guns removed to arm the Lord Clive-class monitors. Illustrious was similarly disarmed, with two of her guns going to the Tyne Turrets. Hannibal, Magnificent, and Mars were then used as troop ships during the operations off the Dardanelles. In late 1915 after the conclusion of the Dardanelles Campaign, Hannibal was stationed in Egypt as a depot ship, while Magnificent and Mars returned to Britain to be used as an ammunition ship and a depot ship, respectively.

Victorious was converted into a repair ship in 1915–1916 and based in Scapa Flow, the main base of the Grand Fleet. Jupiter was transferred to the Suez Canal Patrol in mid-1915, before returning to Devonport in late 1916 to be paid off. By 1916, Illustrious had been converted into a storeship and based in Chatham; she was joined there by Prince George, by then converted into a barracks ship. From December 1914 to September 1918, Caesar was employed as a guard ship, first at Gibraltar and then in the North America and West Indies Station. She served in the Adriatic Squadron in September 1918, and then in the Aegean Squadron in October. After the war, she supported the Allied intervention in the Russian Civil War in the Black Sea as a depot ship; she was the last British pre-dreadnought to serve overseas in any capacity.

Hannibal and Jupiter were sold in January 1920 and thereafter broken up in Italy and Britain, respectively. Illustrious followed her sisters to the breakers in June 1920, being scrapped at Barrow-in-Furness. Caesar was paid off in April 1920 and eventually sold for scrapping in Germany in July 1922. Magnificent and Mars were sold for scrap in May 1921 and broken up at Inverkeithing and Briton Ferry, respectively. Prince George was sold for scrapping in Germany in September, but while en route she ran aground off Camperduin. Victorious was renamed Indus II in 1920 and eventually sold for scrap in December 1922.
