= Tynemouth Watchtower =

Grade II listed building in England

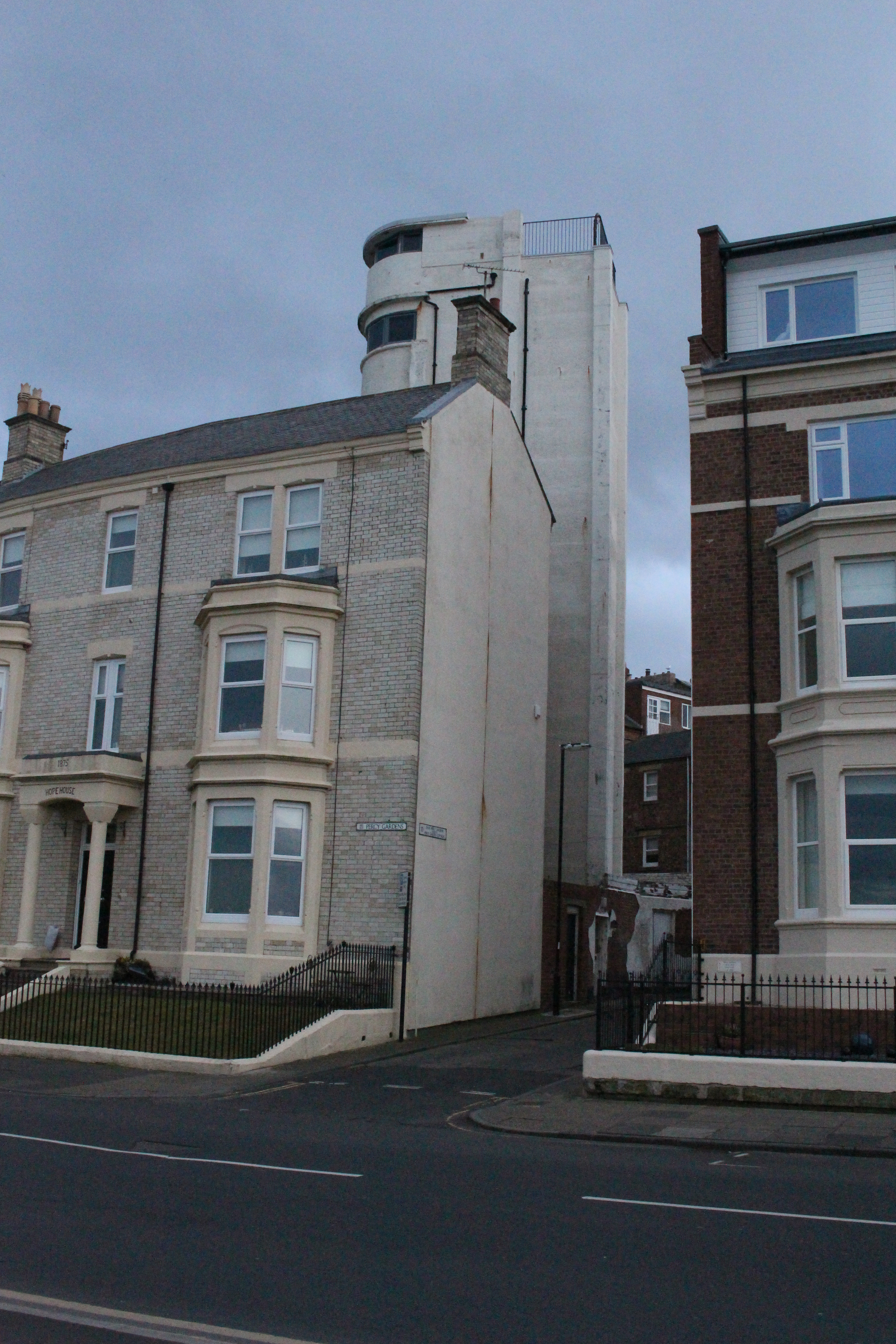
- The tower in 2018
- Interactive map of Tynemouth Watchtower
- 55°01′20″N 1°25′20″W
- Type: Look-out post and gun emplacement
- Location: 47A Percy Gardens, Tynemouth, North Tyneside
- OS grid reference: NZ 37032 69880

History
- Built: c. 1916
- Built for: War Office

Site notes
- Architectural style: Reinforced concrete
- Owner: Private

Listed Building – Grade II
- Official name: 47A, Percy Gardens
- Designated: 19 February 1986
- Reference no.: 1299885

The Tynemouth Watchtower, formally listed as 47A Percy Gardens, is a seven-storey reinforced concrete tower at Tynemouth, North Tyneside, in Tyne and Wear, England. Erected for the War Office in about 1916, it was built as a look-out post, fall-of-shot observation tower and range-finding station for the coastal artillery defending the mouth of the River Tyne. It has been designated a Grade II listed building since 19 February 1986. Sold by the Ministry of Defence in 1967, the tower was subsequently converted to residential use, and it remains a private dwelling.

== Background ==
The construction of the tower followed the German naval bombardment of the north-east coast in December 1914 and subsequent Zeppelin raids on Tyneside, which prompted a substantial strengthening of the region's coastal defences. Among the resulting works were the Tyne Turrets, a pair of batteries mounting 12-inch (300 mm) Mk VIII guns removed from the battleship HMS Illustrious: Roberts Battery at Hartley, north of the river, and Kitchener Battery at Marsden, to the south. The Tynemouth tower was raised in association with these installations and with the existing Tynemouth Battery at Tynemouth Priory.

The batteries were not brought into service before the Armistice; the Tyne Turrets were commissioned only in 1921 and were dismantled in 1926. The tower nevertheless remained in military hands and, according to accounts published at the time of the building's sale, was brought back into use from 1939 as a look-out and command position during World War II.

== Description ==
The Historic England list entry describes the building as a "look-out post and gun emplacement" of about 1916, comprising a reinforced concrete tower of seven storeys with a gun emplacement on the roof. The north elevation is plain and contains a boarded door; the south front carries six-sided windows set in rounded bays on the four upper floors. Internally, a concrete staircase with an iron handrail rises from the ground to the roof space, the trap-door to which is now blocked.

The structure stands approximately 70 feet (21 m) high and was described by the selling agent in 2023 as one of the tallest towers of its kind in the country. The principal rooms are curved in plan and measure approximately 3 metres (9.8 ft) by 4.79 metres (15.7 ft). Owing to its height and its position above the seafront, the building commands views over Tynemouth Castle, Long Sands and, in clear conditions, the Cheviot Hills some 50 miles (80 km) to the north.

== Residential use ==
The tower was sold by the Ministry of Defence in 1967 and thereafter adapted as a private house. The conversion arranged three bedrooms, a kitchen and a bathroom over the lower floors, with a sitting room occupying the former look-out storey and an observatory and terrace formed at roof level, on the site of the former gun position. A yard to the rear provides parking.

The property changed hands again in 2000 and was placed on the market in November 2023 at an asking price of £500,000, its first sale in twenty-three years.

== Restoration ==
The tower was subsequently acquired by Roly and Jaemi Glancy, who moved from a semi-detached house in Cullercoats with their three children. Roly Glancy, formerly the proprietor of an architectural practice, told reporters in December 2025 that the couple "were on the lookout for a property with character, something that was a bit interesting and unique".

The family's proposals involve stripping the interior back to the original structure before rebuilding. The kitchen is to be relocated from the ground floor to the fifth storey, at the level from which sea views begin; en-suite bathrooms are to be added to the bedrooms below; and the uppermost two floors are to be retained as a sitting room, study and roof terrace. Approximately one hundred steps connect the entrance to the roof. The owners have stated that they intend to occupy the building as a family home for some twenty years and have no plans to sell or let it, and they are documenting the works on social media.

In 2026, the family's occupation of the building was the subject of a first-person feature in The Sunday Times, which described both the outlook from the upper storeys and the practical demands of daily life in a seven-storey house.

Restoration work was reported to be commencing in January 2026.

== See also ==
- Tyne Turrets
- Tynemouth Castle and Priory
- Coastal artillery
