= Sébastien Bigot de Morogues =

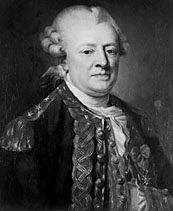
- Born: 1 March 1706; Brest, France
- Died: 26 August 1781 (aged 75); Villefallier, Loiret

Sébastien-François Bigot, vicomte de Morogues (French: [sebastjɛ̃ biɡo də mɔʁoɡ]; 1 March 1706 – 26 August 1781) was a French military officer.

== Early life ==
Sébastien-François Bigot was born on 1 March 1706 in Brest, France.

== Career ==
An artillery specialist, he served in the Royal-Artillerie then the French Navy. In 1759, he commanded the 70 gun Le Magnifique, including at the Battle of Quiberon Bay. He was the first director of the Académie de Marine. In 1763, he published Tactique navale, which was of such quality that it quickly became known in English and Dutch translations. He was made a lieutenant-general in the Navy in 1771.

== Death ==
He died on 26 August 1781 in Villefallier, near Orléans, France.

== Legacy ==
At least three roads in Brittany bear his name, according to the 1997 book Les Noms qui ont fait l'histoire de Bretagne.

== Bibliography ==
- Tactique Navale, 1763.

== Bibliography ==
- Étienne Taillemite, Dictionnaire des marins français, Paris, 2002, Tallandier, ISBN 2-84734-008-4.
