= HMS Majestic (1895) =

Pre-dreadnought battleship of the British Royal Navy

Coordinates: 40°02′30″N 26°11′02″E

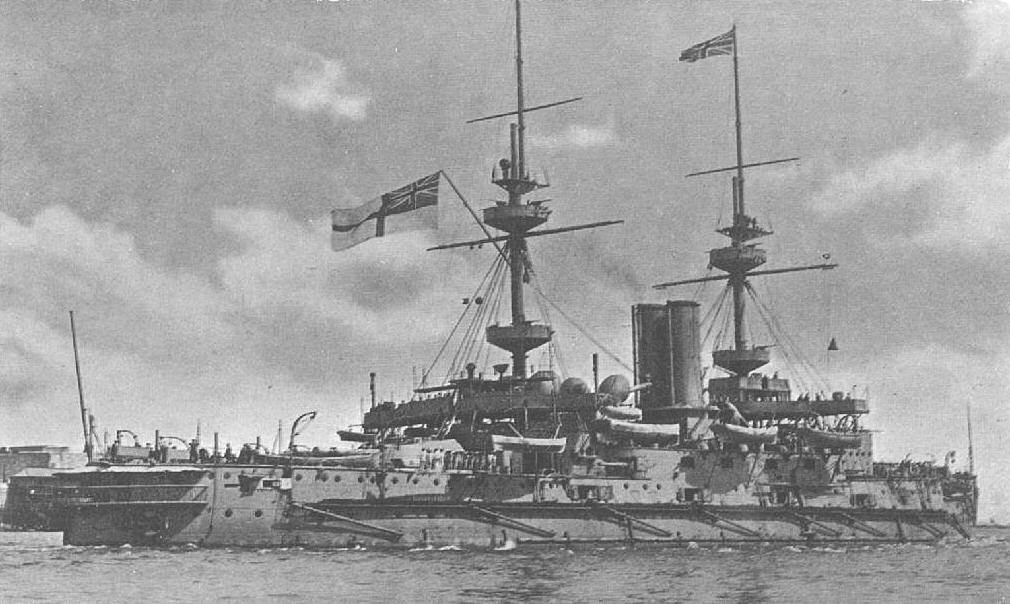
- HMS Majestic

History

United Kingdom
- Name: HMS Majestic
- Builder: Portsmouth Dockyard
- Laid down: February 1894
- Launched: 31 January 1895
- Commissioned: 12 December 1895
- Fate: Sunk, 27 May 1915

General characteristics
- Class & type: Majestic-class pre-dreadnought battleship
- Displacement: 16,060 long tons (16,320 t)
- Length: 421 ft (128 m)
- Beam: 75 ft (23 m)
- Draught: 27 ft (8.2 m)
- Installed power: 8 × Scotch marine boilers; 10,000 ihp (7,500 kW)
- Propulsion: 2 × triple-expansion steam engines; 2 × screw propellers
- Speed: 16 kn (30 km/h; 18 mph)
- Complement: 672
- Armament: 4 × BL 12 in (305 mm) guns; 12 × QF 6 in (152 mm) guns; 16 × 12 pounder (76 mm) guns; 12 × 3 pounder (47 mm) quick-firing guns; 5 × 18 in (457 mm) torpedo tubes
- Armour: Belt armour: 9 in (229 mm); Deck: 2.5 to 4.5 in (64 to 114 mm); Barbettes: 14 in (356 mm); Conning tower: 14 inches

HMS Majestic was a Majestic-class pre-dreadnought battleship of the Royal Navy. Commissioned in 1895, she was the largest pre-dreadnought launched at the time. She served with the Channel Fleet until 1904, following which she was assigned to the Atlantic Fleet. In 1907, she was part of the Home Fleet, firstly assigned to the Nore Division and then with the Devonport Division. From 1912, she was part of the 7th Battle Squadron.

When the First World War broke out Majestic, together with the rest of the squadron, was attached to the Channel Fleet during the early stages of the war before being detached for escort duties with Canadian troop convoys. She then had spells as a guard ship at the Nore and the Humber. In early 1915, she was dispatched to the Mediterranean for service in the Dardanelles Campaign. She participated in bombardments of Turkish forts and supported the Allied landings at Gallipoli. On 27 May 1915, she was torpedoed by a U-boat at Cape Helles, sinking with the loss of 49 men.

== Design ==
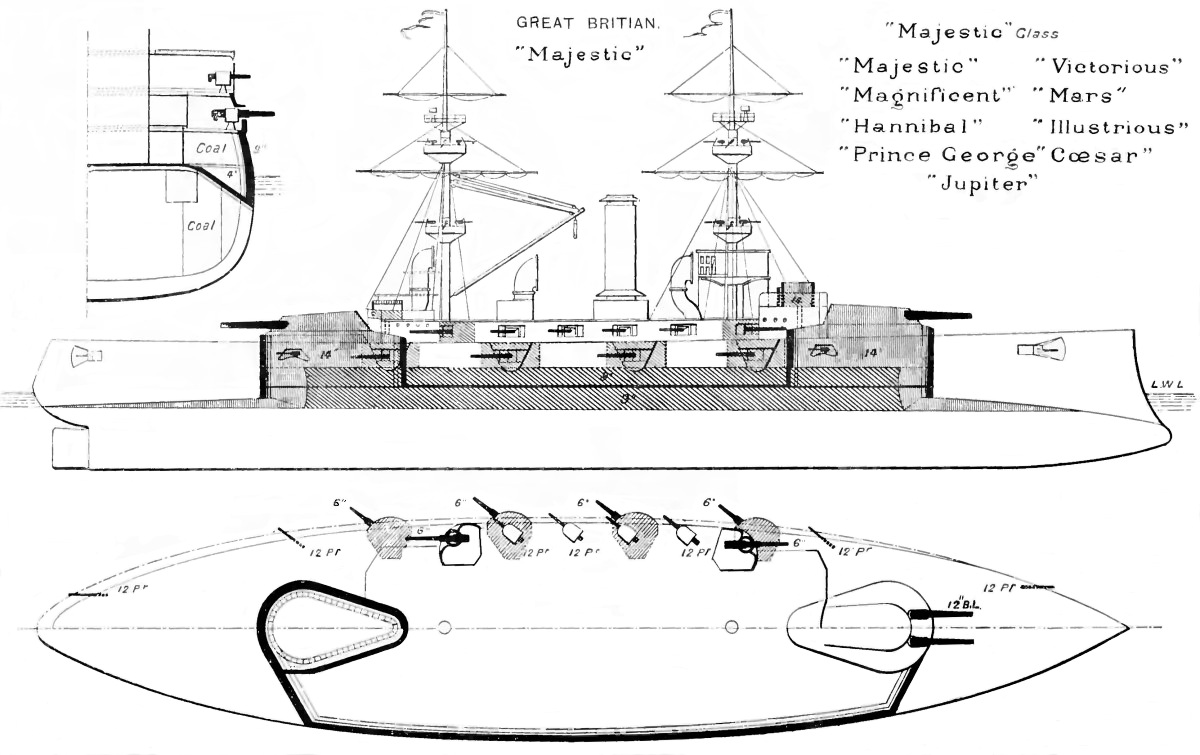
Right elevation, deck plan, and hull section as depicted in Brassey's Naval Annual 1902

Majestic was 421 feet (128 m) long overall and had a beam of 75 ft (23 m) and a draft of 27 ft (8.2 m). She displaced up to 16,060 long tons (16,320 t) at full load. Her propulsion system consisted of two 3-cylinder triple-expansion steam engines powered by eight coal-fired, cylindrical fire-tube Scotch marine boilers. By 1907–1908, she was re-boilered with oil-fired models. Her engines provided a top speed of 16 knots (30 km/h; 18 mph) at 10,000 indicated horsepower (7,500 kW). The Majestics were considered good seaboats with an easy roll and good steamers, although they suffered from high fuel consumption. She had a crew of 672 officers and ratings.

The ship was armed with a main battery of four BL 12-inch (305 mm) Mk VIII guns in twin-gun turrets, one forward and one aft. The turrets were placed on pear-shaped barbettes; six of her sisters had the same arrangement, but her sisters Caesar and Illustrious and all future British battleship classes had circular barbettes. Majestic also carried a secondary battery of twelve QF 6-inch (152 mm) /40 guns. They were mounted in casemates in two gun decks amidships. She also carried sixteen QF 12-pounder guns and twelve QF 2-pounder guns for defence against torpedo boats. She was also equipped with five 18 in (457 mm) torpedo tubes, four of which were submerged in the ship's hull, with the last in a deck-mounted launcher.

Majestic and the other ships of her class had 9 inches (229 mm) of Harvey steel in their belt armour, which allowed equal protection with less cost in weight compared to previous types of armour. This allowed Majestic and her sisters to have a deeper and lighter belt than previous battleships without any loss in protection. The barbettes for the main battery were protected with 14 in (356 mm) of armour, and the conning tower had the same thickness of steel on the sides. The ship's armoured deck was 2.5 to 4.5 in (64 to 114 mm) thick.

== Operational history ==
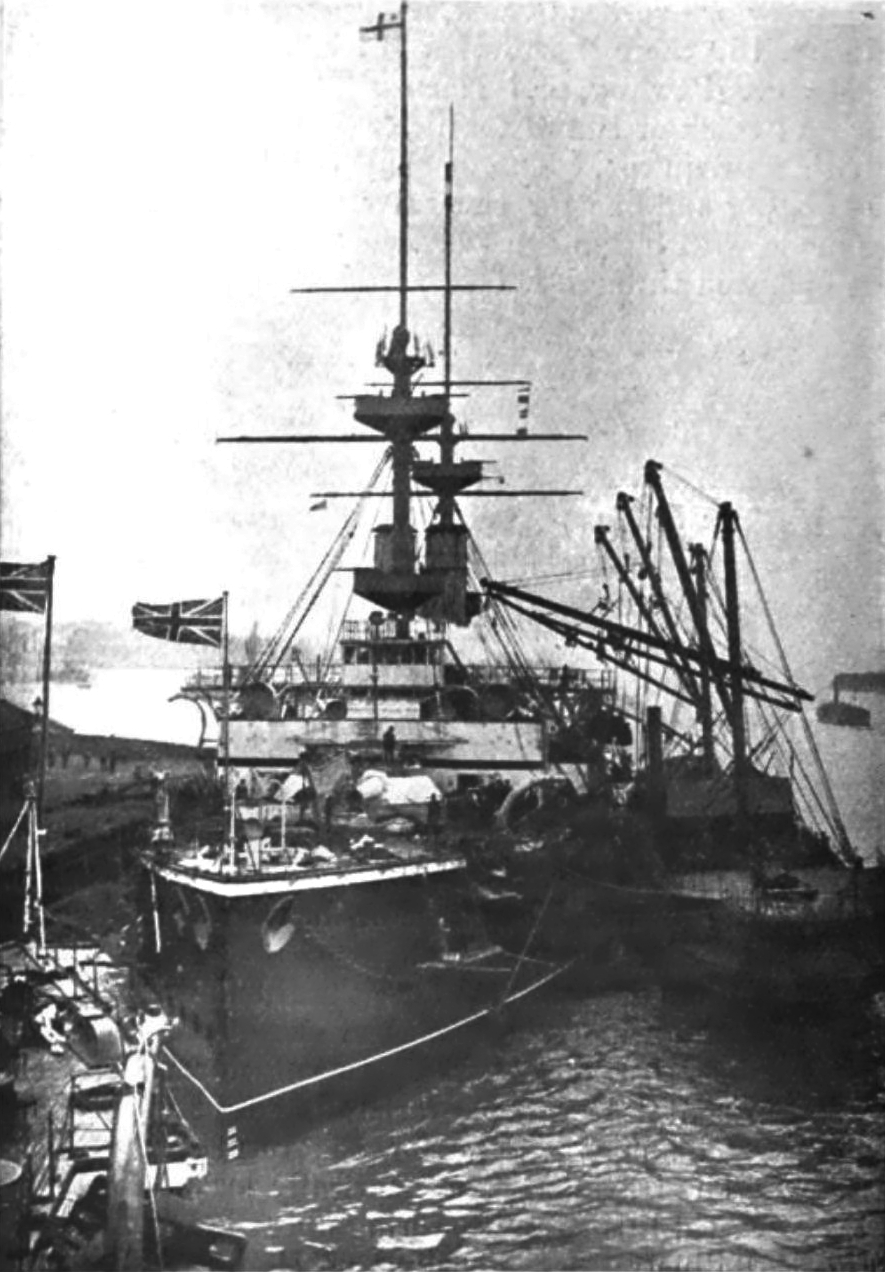
Majestic being coaled circa 1904

Majestic was laid down at the Portsmouth Dockyard in February 1894. She was launched from No. 13 Dock on 31 January 1895, by Princess Louise, Duchess of Argyll. After fitting-out work she commenced her builders trials in September 1895 in the waters south of the Isle of Wright. These were disrupted when on 9 September while passing through Spithead she ran aground on a sandbank and on a rising tide was refloated two hours later with no damage. She competed her trials on 18 September. She was commissioned into the Royal Navy at 9 am on 12 December 1895, with most of her crew having been sourced from HMS Royal Sovereign which at the time was in dry dock having with bilge keels fitted. She put to sea on 17 January 1896 to undertake further trials in the Channel on the way to Portland Harbour. She was assigned to the Channel Squadron's Portsmouth division. She then travelled north to the Clyde before spending the summer at Berehaven on the south coast of Ireland.

She was present at the Fleet Review at Spithead for the Diamond Jubilee of Queen Victoria on 26 June 1897, and was later flagship to Vice-Admiral Sir Harry Rawson, Commander-in-Chief of the Channel Fleet. Captain George Egerton was appointed in command on 28 June 1899, and paid off in April 1901, when Captain Edward Eden Bradford was appointed in command as she became the flagship of Rear-Admiral Arthur Wilson, who had been appointed Commander-in-Chief of the Channel Squadron. She took part in the Coronation Review held at Spithead for King Edward VII on 16 August 1902, and in September that year was head of a squadron visiting Nauplia and Souda Bay at Crete in the Mediterranean Sea. She underwent a refit at Portsmouth from February to July 1904, and then became a unit of the Atlantic Fleet when a reorganisation resulted in the Channel Fleet becoming the Atlantic Fleet in January 1905. On 1 October 1906, she paid off into reserve at Portsmouth.

Majestic recommissioned at Portsmouth on 26 February 1907 to become flagship of the Nore Division in the new Home Fleet, stationed at the Nore. She began a refit later that year in which she received radio and new fire control systems. When the flag was transferred to another ship in January 1908, she became a private ship in the Nore Division. In June 1908, Majestic transferred to the Devonport Division of the Home Fleet, stationed at Devonport. Her refit was completed in 1909, and in March 1909 she transferred to the 3rd Division at Devonport, then in August 1910 to the 4th Division at Devonport, where she underwent another refit in 1911. In May 1912, Majestic became part of the 7th Battle Squadron in the 3rd Fleet at Devonport. On 14 July 1912 she collided with her sister ship Victorious during manoeuvres, suffering no serious damage.

=== First World War ===
Upon the outbreak of the First World War in August 1914, Majestic and the rest of the 7th Battle Squadron were assigned to the Channel Fleet. Majestic underwent a refit in August and September 1914, then covered the passage of the British Expeditionary Force to France in September 1914. She was detached from the 7th Battle Squadron from 3 October 1914 to 14 October 1914 to escort the first Canadian troop convoy. At the end of October 1914, Majestic was transferred to the Nore to serve as guard ship there. On 3 November 1914, she transferred to the Humber to serve as guard ship there. In December 1914 she became a unit of the Dover Patrol, and combined with battleship Revenge to bombard German coastal artillery from off of Nieuwpoort, Belgium, on 15 December 1914. In January 1915, she was based at Portland.

==== Dardanelles campaign ====
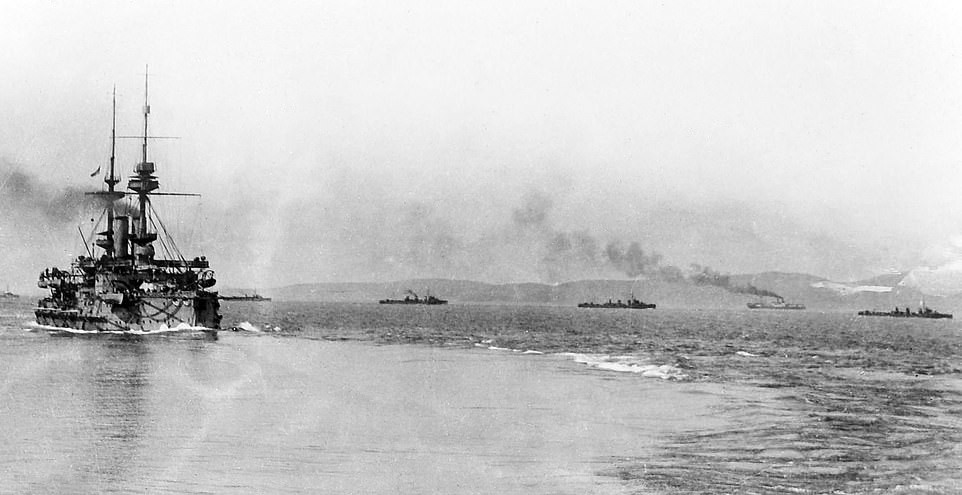
Majestic steaming out of Mudros harbour with several destroyers

In February 1915, Majestic was assigned to participate in the upcoming Dardanelles Campaign to open the Turkish Straits, and she departed early that month under the command of Captain H. F. G. Talbot to join the Mediterranean Fleet. Upon arriving at Malta, she was fitted with what was termed "mine-catching" gear so that she could serve as a "mine-bumper". She joined the Dardanelles force on 24 February 1915, and on 26 February 1915 departed Tenedos to bombard the Ottoman Turkish inner forts at the Dardanelles that morning. On 26 February 1915, Majestic and battleships Albion and Triumph became the first Allied heavy ships to enter the Turkish Straits during the campaign, firing on the inner forts from 0914 until 1740 hours. Majestic took a hit below the waterline, but was able to continue operations and patrolled the area again on 27 February 1915. She supported the early landings, shelling the forts from 1125 until 1645 hours on 1 March 1915 and again while patrolling on 3 March 1915. She arrived at Mudros on 8 March 1915.

On 9 March 1915, Majestic circumnavigated the entrance to the Dardanelles and bombarded Ottoman Turkish positions from 1007 until 1215 hours. She returned to Tenedos on 10 March 1915, patrolled off the Dardanelles again on 15 March 1915, and again returned to Tenedos on 16 March 1915. Majestic participated in the final attempt to force the straits by naval power alone on 18 March 1915. She opened fire on Fort 9 at 1420 hours and also engaged Turkish field guns hidden in woods. She shelled Fort 9 until she ceased fire at 18:35; the fort meanwhile fired on the mortally damaged battleship Ocean. Majestic was hit four times, twice in her lower tops and twice on her forecastle, and returned to Tenedos at 2200 hours with one dead and some wounded crew members. Majestic returned to patrol duties on 22 March 1915. She shelled Turkish positions on 28 March 1915 from 0950 to 1015 and from 1250 to 1340 hours and again opened fire on 14 April at 1458 hours. On 18 April, she fired on the abandoned British submarine E15 aground near Fort Dardanos and in danger of being captured; two picket boats, one from Majestic and one from Triumph, destroyed E15 with torpedoes, although the boat from Majestic was itself sunk by Turkish shore batteries while retiring. Majestic returned to Tenedos on 21 April 1915.

On 25 April 1915, Majestic was back in action, signalling London that Allied landings had begun at Gallipoli and supporting them with coastal bombardments until 1915 hours. She brought 99 wounded troops aboard at 2110 hours and recovered all her boats before anchoring off Gallipoli for the night. On 26 April 1915, she was back in action early, opening fire at 0617 hours. On 27 April 1915 she exchanged fire with Turkish guns, with several Turkish shells achieving very near misses before both sides ceased firing at 1130 hours. On 29 April 1915 she again was anchored off Gallipoli. Majestic relieved Triumph as flagship of Admiral Nicholson, commanding the squadrons supporting the troops ashore off Cape Helles, on 25 May 1915. (Note: Conway's All the World's Fighting Ships 1906–1921, however, gives the date of becoming flagship as 26 May 1915. See Preston, p. 7.)

=== Loss ===
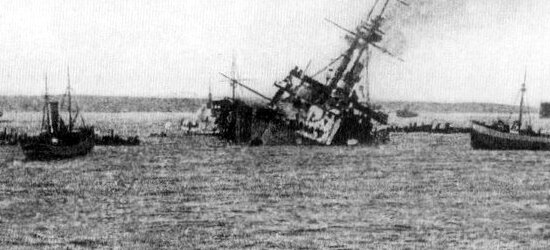
Majestic sinking at the Dardanelles, 27 May 1915

On 27 May 1915, while stationed off W Beach at Cape Helles, Majestic became the third battleship to be torpedoed off the Gallipoli peninsula in two weeks. Around 0645 hours, Commander Otto Hersing of the German submarine U-21 fired a single torpedo through the defensive screen of destroyers and anti-torpedo nets, striking Majestic and causing a huge explosion. The ship began to list to port and in nine minutes had capsized in 54 feet (16 m) of water, killing 49 men. (Note: According to Conway's All the World's Fighting Ships 1906–1921, however, Majestic capsized in seven minutes and only 40 men were killed. See Preston, p. 7.) Her masts hit the mud of the sea bottom, and her upturned hull remained visible for many months until it was finally submerged when her foremast collapsed during a storm.

== Dive site ==
In October 2021, Turkey opened the Gallipoli Historic Underwater Park, an underwater museum off Çanakkale accessible to scuba divers. The park includes a number of wrecks from vessels sunk during the Dardanelles and Gallipoli campaigns, including Majestic and the battleship Triumph. The wreck of Majestic now lies at a depth of 24 m (79 ft), and it is largely intact.
