= HMS Magnificent (1894) =

Pre-dreadnought battleship of the British Royal Navy

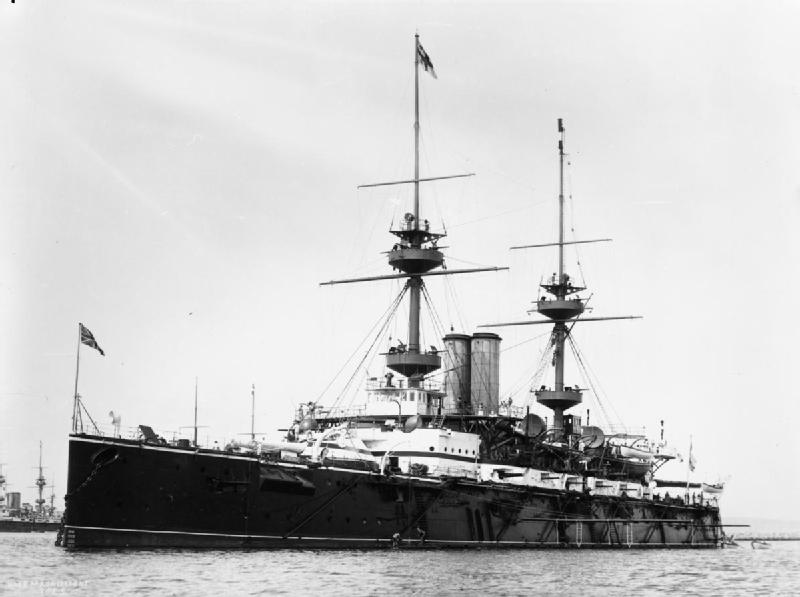
- HMS Magnificent

History

United Kingdom
- Name: HMS Magnificent
- Builder: Chatham Dockyard
- Laid down: 18 December 1893
- Launched: 19 December 1894
- Commissioned: 12 December 1895
- Decommissioned: April 1921
- Fate: Sold for scrapping 9 May 1921

General characteristics
- Class & type: Majestic-class pre-dreadnought battleship
- Displacement: 16,060 long tons (16,320 t)
- Length: 421 ft (128 m)
- Beam: 75 ft (23 m)
- Draught: 27 ft (8.2 m)
- Installed power: 8 × Scotch marine boilers; 10,000 ihp (7,500 kW)
- Propulsion: 2 × triple-expansion steam engines; 2 × screw propellers
- Speed: 16 kn (30 km/h; 18 mph)
- Complement: 672
- Armament: 4 × BL 12 in (305 mm) guns; 12 × QF 6 in (152 mm) guns; 16 × 12 pounder (76 mm) guns; 12 × 3 pounder (47 mm) quick-firing guns; 5 × 18 in (457 mm) torpedo tubes
- Armour: Belt armor: 9 in (229 mm); Deck: 2.5 to 4.5 in (64 to 114 mm); Barbettes: 14 in (356 mm); Conning tower: 14 inches

HMS Magnificent was one of the nine Majestic-class pre-dreadnought battleships of the Royal Navy. She entered service in late 1895 with the Channel Fleet, remaining with the fleet through its subsequent reorganisation into the Atlantic Fleet. In 1905, an explosion caused the deaths of 18 men but she remained in service until 1906, after which she underwent a refit. She served with the Home Fleet for most of her pre-war service.

Among the oldest of Britain's battleships at the time, Magnificent was a guard ship on the Humber when the First World War broke out. She was then, together with her sister ship Hannibal, assigned to Scapa Flow as a guard ship. In 1915, she was stripped of her main armament, and later in that year was converted to a troopship for use in the Dardanelles Campaign. Returning to England in 1916, she was inactive until late 1917, at which time she was converted to an ammunition ship. She continued to serve in this role until 1921, at which time she was decommissioned before being scrapped the following year.

== Design ==
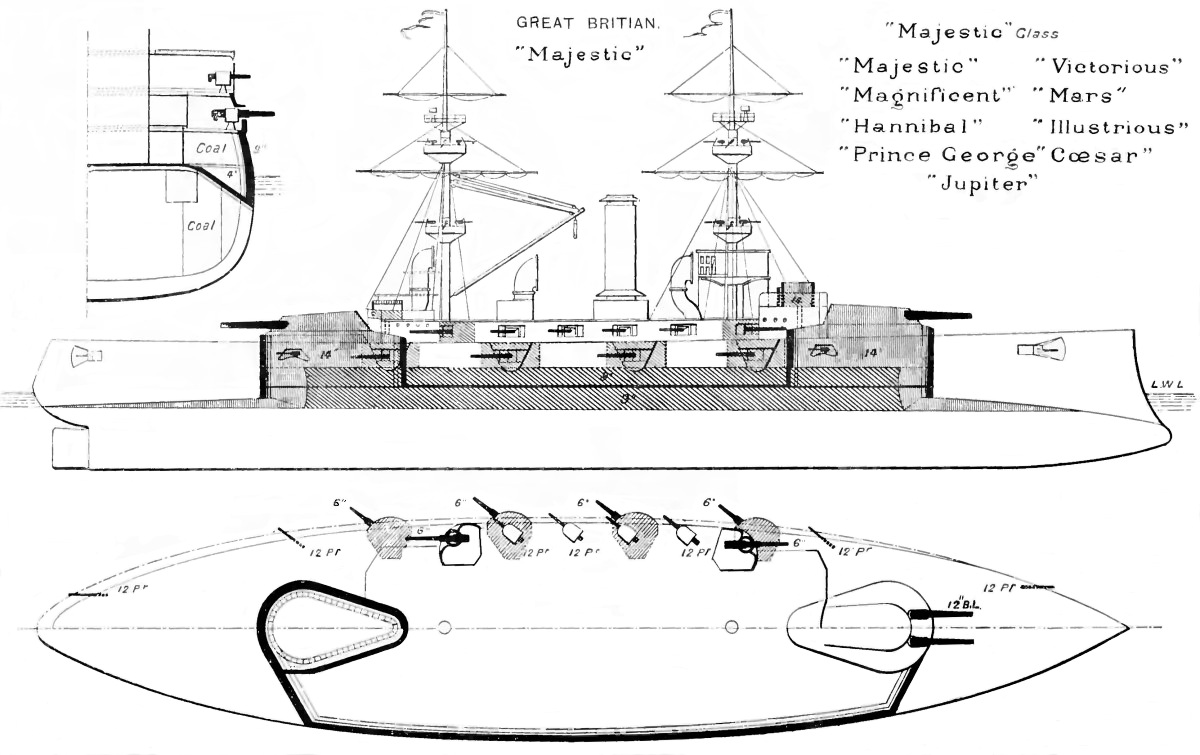
Right elevation, deck plan, and hull section as depicted in Brassey's Naval Annual 1902

Magnificent was 421 feet (128 m) long overall and had a beam of 75 ft (23 m) and a draft of 27 ft (8.2 m). She displaced up to 16,060 long tons (16,320 t) at full load. Her propulsion system consisted of two 3-cylinder triple-expansion steam engines powered by eight coal-fired, cylindrical fire-tube Scotch marine boilers. By 1907–1908, she was re-boilered with oil-fired models. Her engines provided a top speed of 16 knots (30 km/h; 18 mph) at 10,000 indicated horsepower (7,500 kW). The Majestics were considered good seaboats with an easy roll and good steamers, although they suffered from high fuel consumption. She had a crew of 672 officers and ratings.

The ship was armed with a main battery of four BL 12-inch (305 mm) Mk VIII guns in twin-gun turrets, one forward and one aft. The turrets were placed on pear-shaped barbettes; six of her sisters had the same arrangement, but her sisters Caesar and Illustrious and all future British battleship classes had circular barbettes. Magnificent also carried a secondary battery of twelve QF 6-inch (152 mm) /40 guns. They were mounted in casemates in two gun decks amidships. She also carried sixteen QF 12-pounder guns and twelve QF 2-pounder guns for defence against torpedo boats. She was also equipped with five 18 in (457 mm) torpedo tubes, four of which were submerged in the ship's hull, with the last in a deck-mounted launcher.

Magnificent and the other Majestic-class ships had 9 inches (229 mm) of Harvey steel in their belt armour, which allowed equal protection with less weight compared to previous types of armour. This allowed Magnificent and her sisters to have a deeper and lighter belt than previous battleships without any loss of protection. The barbettes for the main battery were protected with 14 in (356 mm) of armor, and the conning tower had the same thickness of steel on the sides. The ship's armored deck was 2.5 to 4.5 in (64 to 114 mm) thick.

== Service history ==
Magnificent was laid down at the Chatham Dockyard on 18 December 1893. She was launched a year and a day later, on 19 December 1894, after which fitting-out work commenced. She was commissioned into the Royal Navy another year later, in December 1895, to relieve the battleship Empress of India as second flagship of the Channel Fleet. On 26 June 1897, she was present at the Fleet Review at Spithead for the Diamond Jubilee of Queen Victoria. Captain John Ferris was appointed in command in January 1899, and from February the following year she joined the Eastern division of the Channel Fleet, flying the flag of Rear-Admiral Arthur Dalrymple Fanshawe. On receiving word of the death of Queen Victoria on 21 January 1901 while stationed in Portsmouth, Magnificent flew the Royal Standard at half mast. Captain Arthur John Horsley was appointed in command in October 1900, and in June the following year she became flagship of Rear-Admiral Sir William Acland, second in command of the Channel Squadron. He relinquished the position one year later, and at sunset on 5 June 1902 struck his flag on board the Magnificent. Rear-Admiral Assheton Curzon-Howe, who had succeeded Acland, transferred to the vessel later the same month. She took part in the fleet review held at Spithead on 16 August 1902 for the coronation of King Edward VII, and visited the Aegean Sea for combined manoeuvres with the Mediterranean Fleet the following month. Captain Sackville Carden was appointed in command on 16 October 1902, and took her to visit Gibraltar and Tetuan the following week.

By January 1904, the ship had become the flagship of the Channel Fleet. As a result of a reorganization in January 1905, the Channel Fleet became the Atlantic Fleet, and Magnificent accordingly became a part of the Atlantic Fleet. A gun explosion aboard Magnificent on 14 June 1905 resulted in 18 casualties. The explosion was caused by a faulty shell in one of the 6-inch guns; it failed to fire, and when the loader opened the breech, contact with the fresh air detonated the shell. On 15 November 1906, she ended her Atlantic Fleet service and was paid off at Devonport. Magnificent was commissioned into reserve on 16 November 1906, based at Chatham. During her reserve service, she was attached to the Gunnery School at Sheerness as a gunnery training ship in December 1906.

Magnificent left Chatham in March 1907 and was assigned to the Nore Division of the Home Fleet at the Nore. During this service, she was temporarily the flagship of the Commander-in-Chief in November 1907 and underwent a refit at Chatham in 1908 during which she had new fire control systems installed and was converted to burn fuel oil. She served as the second flagship of the Home Fleet from August 1908 to January 1909. Magnificent was reduced to a nucleus crew in February 1909 as part of the commissioned reserve. On 24 March 1909, she became the flagship of the Vice Admiral, 3rd and 4th Divisions, Home Fleet, at the Nore. She was relieved as flagship on 1 March 1910 by the battleship Bulwark. On 27 September 1910, Magnificent was recommissioned into the Home Fleet to serve as a turret drill ship and stokers' training ship at Devonport. Her sternwalk was damaged in a collision in December 1910. She became tender to the turret drill ship Vivid in February 1911 and a seagoing gunnery training ship at Devonport on 14 May 1912. She was slightly damaged on 16 June 1913 when she ran aground in fog near Cawsand Bay. She recommissioned for 3rd Fleet service on 1 July 1913.

=== First World War ===
During a precautionary mobilisation of the fleet immediately prior to the outbreak of First World War, Magnificent and her sister ships Hannibal, Mars, and Victorious on 27 July 1914 formed the 9th Battle Squadron, subordinate to the Admiral of Patrols and stationed at the Humber. Magnificent served as guard ship at the Humber. The war began while she was stationed there. On 7 August 1914, the 9th Battle Squadron was dissolved, and Magnificent and Hannibal transferred to Scapa Flow to reinforce the defences of the anchorage of the Grand Fleet there, becoming a guard ship at Scapa Flow. The Majestic-class ships were by then the oldest and least effective battleships in service in the Royal Navy. The first-class protected cruiser Crescent relieved Magnificent of guard ship duty on 16 February 1915, at which point Magnificent was paid off.

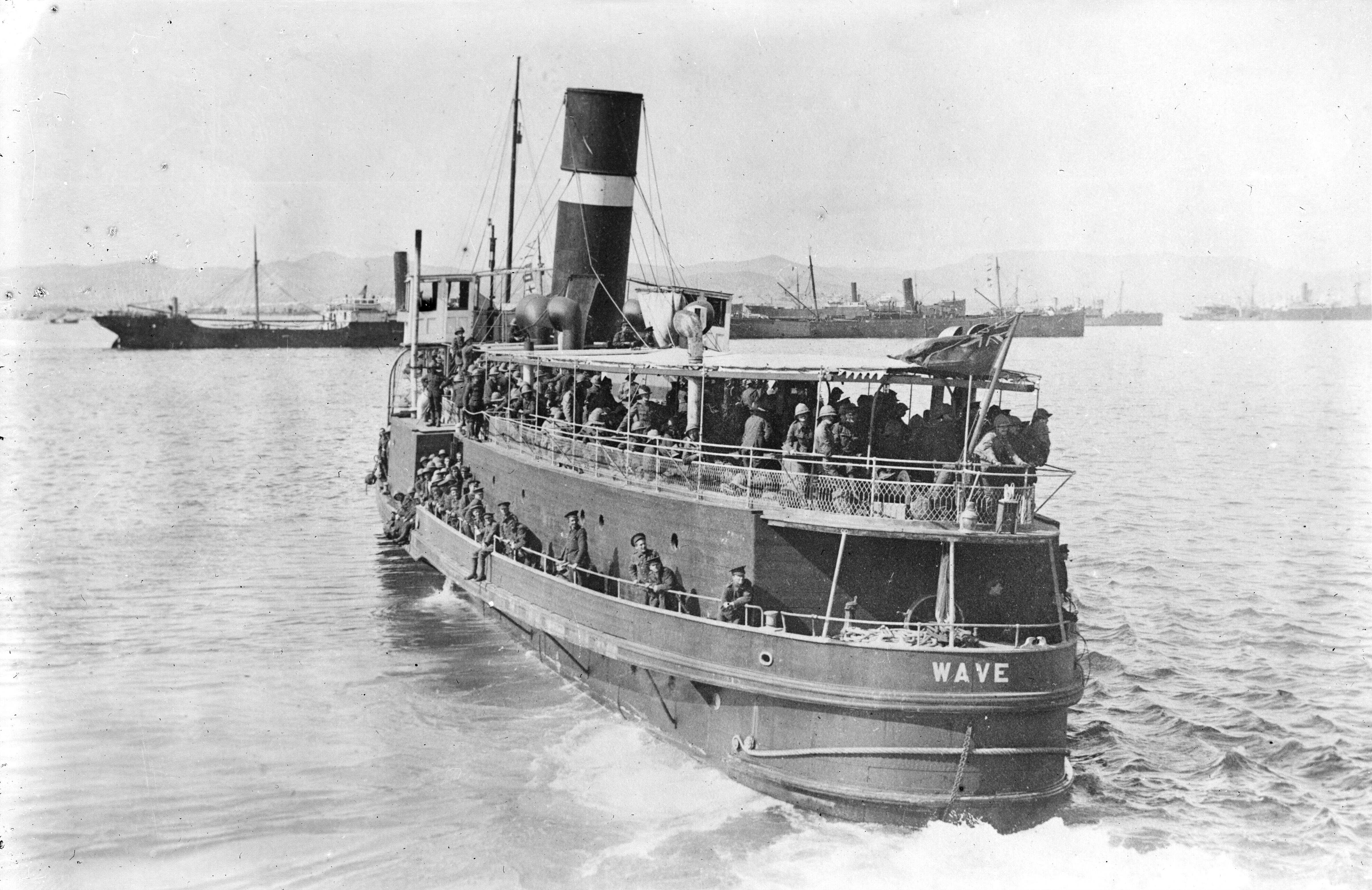
Wave leaving Magnificent with troops for Gallipoli, 10 October 1914

Later in February 1915, Magnificent arrived at Belfast to be disarmed. In March and April 1915, all of her 12-inch guns and all except for four of her 6-inch guns were removed. Her 12-inch guns were taken to arm the new Lord Clive-class monitors General Craufurd and Prince Eugene. After she was disarmed, Magnificent was laid up at Loch Goil in April 1915. On 9 September 1915, Magnificent was recommissioned to serve along with her similarly disarmed sister ships Hannibal and Mars as a troopship for the Dardanelles campaign. The three former battleships departed the United Kingdom on this duty on 22 September 1915, arriving at Mudros on 7 October 1915. On 18 December 1915 and 19 December 1915, Magnificent took part in the evacuation of Allied troops from Suvla Bay. She departed the Dardanelles in February 1916 after the conclusion of the campaign and returned to England, where she was paid off at Devonport on 3 March 1916.

Magnificent remained at Devonport until August 1917, serving as an overflow ship. In August 1917, she began a refit at Harland & Wolff in Belfast for conversion to an ammunition ship. When her refit was completed in October 1918, she was transferred to Rosyth for service as an ammunition store ship. Magnificent was placed on the disposal list on 4 February 1920, but continued to serve as an ammunition store ship at Rosyth until April 1921. She was sold for scrapping on 9 May 1921. Scrapping began at Thos. W. Ward Inverkeithing the following year.
