= Tyne Turrets =

Coastal defence structures near Tynemouth

- Northumberland, England, UK
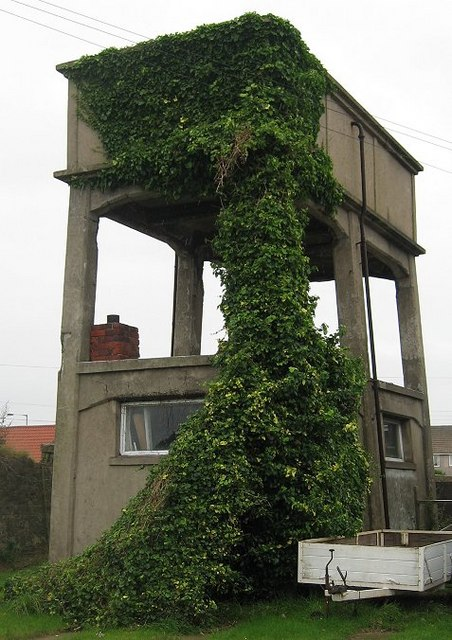
- Water tower at Robert's Battery, one of the two 'Tyne Turrets'

Location
- Location in England
- Coordinates: 55.014°N 1.426°W
- Grid reference: NZ368689

The Tyne Turrets were two 12-inch Mk VIII guns from the battleship HMS Illustrious, installed in Roberts Battery at Hartley, near Seaton Sluice north of the Tyne, and Kitchener Battery in Marsden near Lizard Point south of the river. The batteries were planned in World War I but only commissioned in 1921, and after a change of heart scrapped in 1926. This very heavy armament was only rivalled by the Dover harbour Admiralty Pier Turret at the time.

== See also ==
- Tynemouth Watchtower
