= HMS Caesar (1896) =

Pre-dreadnought battleship of the British Royal Navy

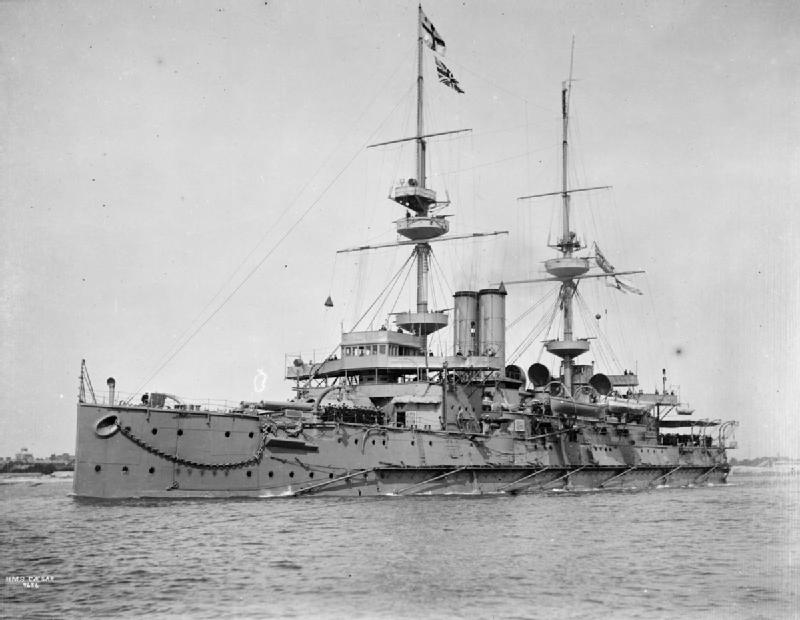
- HMS Caesar

History

United Kingdom
- Name: HMS Caesar
- Namesake: Julius Caesar
- Builder: Portsmouth Dockyard
- Laid down: 25 March 1895
- Launched: 2 September 1896
- Completed: January 1898
- Commissioned: 13 January 1898
- Decommissioned: 23 April 1920
- Fate: Sold for scrapping, 8 November 1921

General characteristics
- Class & type: Majestic-class pre-dreadnought battleship
- Displacement: 16,060 long tons (16,320 t)
- Length: 421 ft (128 m)
- Beam: 75 ft (23 m)
- Draught: 27 ft (8.2 m)
- Installed power: 8 × Scotch marine boilers; 10,000 ihp (7,500 kW)
- Propulsion: 2 × triple-expansion steam engines; 2 × screw propellers
- Speed: 16 kn (30 km/h; 18 mph)
- Complement: 672
- Armament: 4 × BL 12 in (305 mm) guns; 12 × QF 6 in (152 mm) guns; 16 × 12 pounder (76 mm) guns; 12 × 3 pounder (47 mm) quick-firing guns; 5 × 18 in (457 mm) torpedo tubes
- Armour: Belt armour: 9 in (229 mm); Deck: 2.5 to 4.5 in (64 to 114 mm); Barbettes: 14 in (356 mm); Conning tower: 14 inches

HMS Caesar (at the time written Cæsar) was a Majestic-class pre-dreadnought battleship of the Royal Navy, named after the Roman military and political leader Julius Caesar. The ship was built at the Portsmouth Dockyard, starting with her keel laying in March 1895. She was launched in September 1896 and was commissioned into the fleet in January 1898. She was armed with a main battery of four 12-inch (305 mm) guns and a secondary battery of twelve 6-inch (152 mm) guns. The ship had a top speed of 16 knots (30 km/h; 18 mph).

Caesar served with the Mediterranean Fleet after a brief stint in the Channel Fleet. In 1905, she resumed service with a now re-organised Channel Fleet and was also part of the Atlantic Fleet for a time. In the service of the Home Fleet from 1907, she was placed in reserve in 1912. Following the outbreak of the First World War, Caesar returned to the Channel Fleet before being transferred to the North America and West Indies Station in 1915 after a brief spell as a guard ship at Gibraltar. From 1918 to 1919 she served as a depot ship, firstly in the Mediterranean and Aegean Seas and then the Black Sea, in support of naval operations against the Bolsheviks. In this latter role, she was the last of the pre-dreadnought battleships to see service outside the United Kingdom. Returning to England in 1920, she was decommissioned and sold for scrap in 1921.

== Design ==
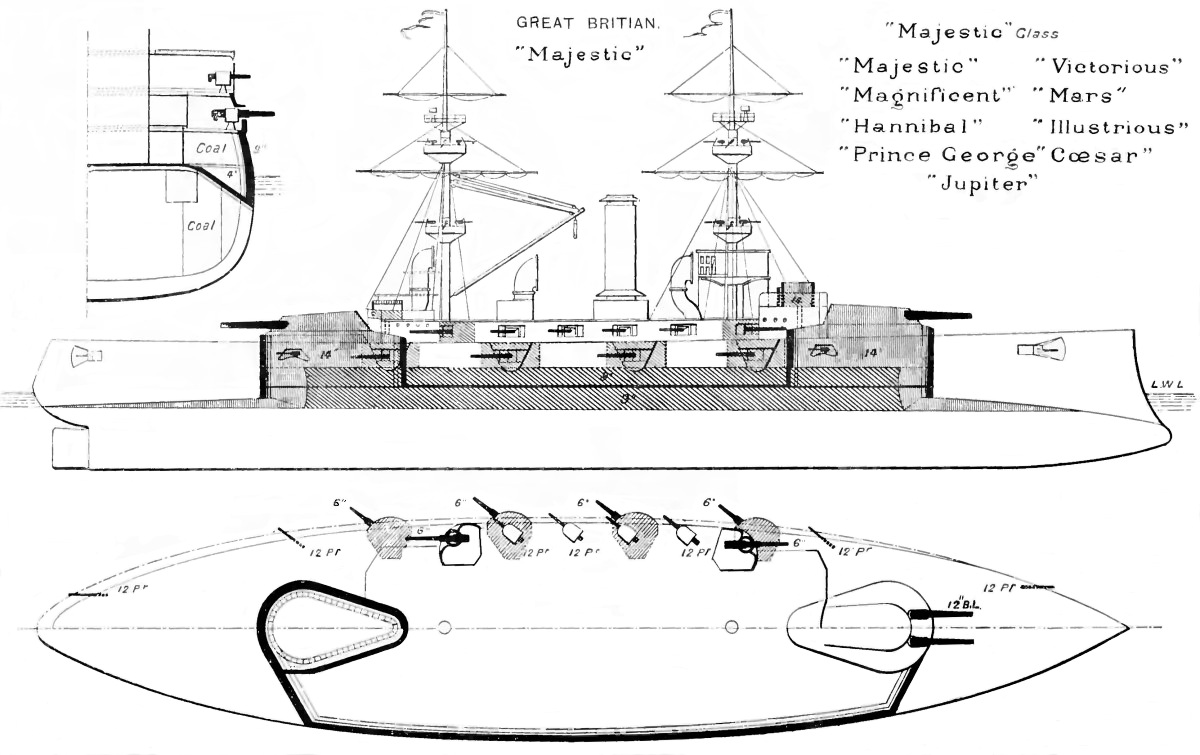
Right elevation, deck plan, and hull section as depicted in Brassey's Naval Annual 1902

Caesar was 421 feet (128 m) long overall and had a beam of 75 ft (23 m) and a draft of 27 ft (8.2 m). She displaced up to 16,060 long tons (16,320 t) at full load. Her propulsion system consisted of two 3-cylinder triple-expansion steam engines powered by eight coal-fired, cylindrical fire-tube Scotch marine boilers. By 1907–1908, she was re-boilered with oil-fired models. Her engines provided a top speed of 16 knots (30 km/h; 18 mph) at 10,000 indicated horsepower (7,500 kW). The Majestics were considered to have handled well, with an easy roll, although they suffered from high fuel consumption. She had a crew of 672 officers and ratings.

The ship was armed with a main battery of four BL 12-inch (305 mm) Mk VIII guns in twin-gun turrets, one forward and one aft. The turrets were placed on circular barbettes, unlike six of her sisters, which retained earlier pear-shaped barbettes. Caesar also carried a secondary battery of twelve QF 6-inch (152 mm) /40 guns. They were mounted in casemates in two gun decks amidships. She also carried sixteen QF 12-pounder guns and twelve QF 2-pounder guns for defence against torpedo boats. She was also equipped with five 18 in (457 mm) torpedo tubes, four of which were submerged in the ship's hull on the broadside, with the last in a deck-mounted launcher on the stern.

Caesar and the other ships of her class had 9 inches (229 mm) of Harvey steel in their belt armour, which allowed equal protection with less cost in weight compared to previous types of armour. This allowed Caesar and her sisters to have a deeper and lighter belt than previous battleships without any loss in protection. The barbettes for the main battery were protected with 14 in (356 mm) of armour, and the conning tower had the same thickness of steel on the sides. The ship's armoured deck was 2.5 to 4.5 in (64 to 114 mm) thick.

== Service history ==
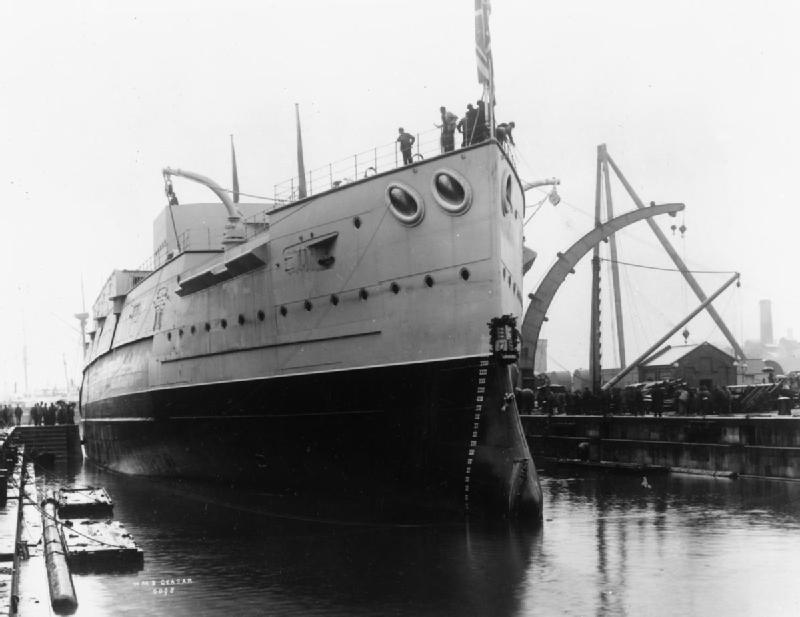
Caesar while fitting out at Portsmouth

HMS Caesar was built at the Portsmouth Dockyard, with her keel laying taking place on 25 March 1895. She was launched on 2 September 1896, and completed in January 1898. The ship was commissioned at Portsmouth on 13 January to serve in the Mediterranean Fleet. Before leaving for the Mediterranean, she was attached temporarily to the Channel Fleet to serve in home waters. In May 1898, Caesar departed the United Kingdom for her Mediterranean service under the command of Captain Edward Harpur Gamble. She visited Taormina on the island of Sicily in February 1900, and underwent a refit at Malta in 1900–1901. Captain George Callaghan was appointed to command her on 21 December 1901, succeeding Captain John Ferris. In February 1903 she left Malta for Platanias, accompanied by HMS Illustrious, HMS London and HMS Myrmidon. She ended her Mediterranean service in October 1903, paying off at Portsmouth on 6 October 1903 to begin a refit.

Her refit completed, Caesar was commissioned at Portsmouth on 2 February 1904 to relieve her sister ship HMS Majestic as flagship of the Channel Fleet. When the Channel Fleet became the Atlantic Fleet as a result of a reorganisation on 1 January 1905, Caesar became flagship of the Atlantic Fleet. She was relieved of this duty in March 1905, becoming 2nd Flagship of the new Channel Fleet (which had been the Home Fleet prior to the reorganisation). On 3 June 1905, Caesar collided with and sank the barque Afghanistan off Dungeness, suffering significant damage; her bridge wings were carried away and the boats, davits, and net booms on her port side were badly damaged. Caesar was refitted at Devonport to repair the damage.

Caesar became Flagship, Rear Admiral, Home Fleet, in December 1905. She was relieved of this duty in February 1907 and transferred back to the Atlantic Fleet to become its temporary flagship. She served in this role until May 1907. On 27 May 1907, Caesar was recommissioned for service in the Devonport Division of the new Home Fleet, which had been formed in January 1907. During this service she underwent a refit at Devonport in 1907–1908. In May 1909, Caesar transferred to the Nore, temporarily serving as the flagship of Vice Admiral, 3rd and 4th Divisions, Home Fleet. In April 1911 she transferred to Devonport to serve in the 3rd Division, Home Fleet. On 16 January 1911, Caesar was rammed by the barque Excelsior in fog at Sheerness, suffering no serious damage. In March 1912, Caesar was placed in commissioned reserve with a nucleus crew as part of the 4th Division, Home Fleet.

=== First World War ===
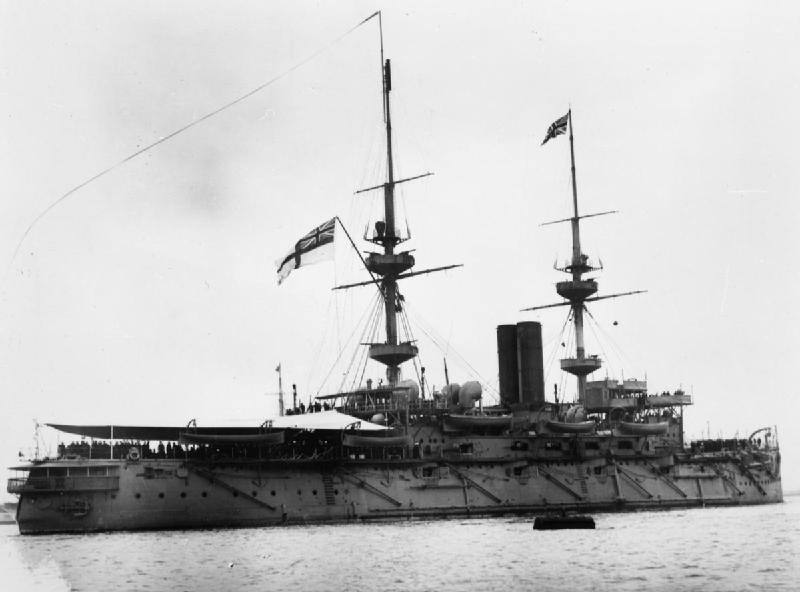
Caesar c. 1905

At the outbreak of the First World War in August 1914, Caesar was brought back into full commission and transferred to the 7th Battle Squadron of the Channel Fleet; the squadron was charged with the defence of the English Channel. During this service she helped in transporting the Plymouth Marine Division from Plymouth to Ostend, Belgium, and covered the passage of the British Expeditionary Force from England to France in September 1914. In December 1914, Caesar was detached from the 7th Battle Squadron and transferred to Gibraltar to serve as guard ship and gunnery training ship there. In July 1915, she transferred to the North America and West Indies Station, serving as guard ship and gunnery training ship at the Royal Naval Dockyard in the Imperial fortress colony of Bermuda and patrolling the Atlantic. In 1918 she was the flagship of Rear-Admiral Sir Morgan Singer, second-in-command, North America and West Indies Station (to Vice-Admiral Sir William Lowther Grant, the Commander-in-Chief, North America and West Indies Station), and Admiral Superintendent, Bermuda.

Her North America and West Indies Station service ended in September 1918, when Caesar was transferred to relieve HMS Andromache (the old second-class cruiser and former minelayer HMS Latona) as flagship of the Senior Naval Officer, British Adriatic Squadron, at Corfu, the last British pre-dreadnought to serve as a flagship. In September 1918, Caesar went to Malta for refit as a depot ship, during which she was equipped with repair shops and with leisure facilities such as recreation rooms and reading rooms. This conversion completed, she took up duties in October 1918 at Mudros as depot ship for the British Aegean Squadron. In January 1919 she was transferred to Port Said, Egypt, for service as a depot ship there. In June 1919, Caesar transited the Dardanelles and transferred to the Black Sea, where she served as a depot ship for British naval forces operating against the Bolsheviks during the Russian Revolution. In this service she became the last British pre-dreadnought to serve operationally overseas. Caesar returned to the United Kingdom in March 1920, paid off at Devonport on 23 April 1920, and was placed on the disposal list. She was sold to a British firm for scrapping on 8 November 1921, then resold to a German firm in July 1922 and towed from Devonport to Germany to be scrapped.
