= HMS Illustrious (1896) =

Pre-dreadnought battleship of the British Royal Navy

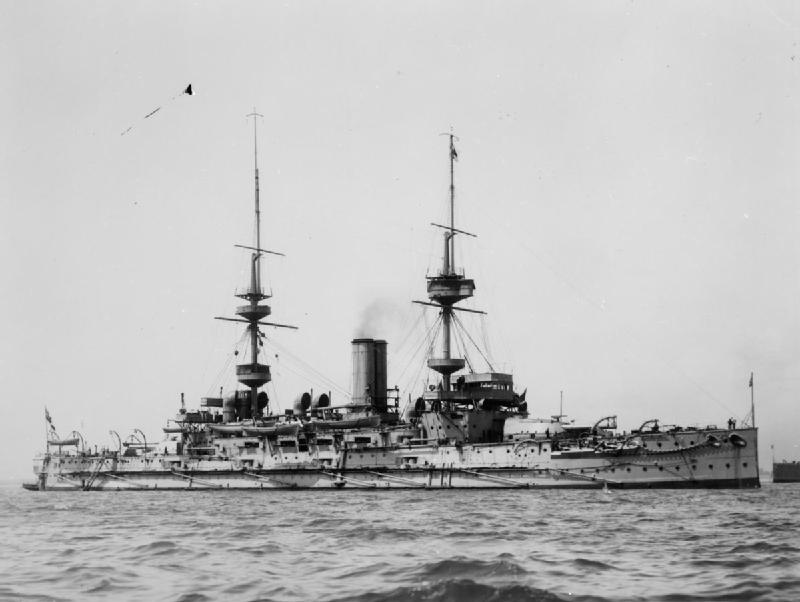
- HMS Illustrious c. 1905

History

United Kingdom
- Builder: Chatham Dockyard
- Laid down: 11 March 1895
- Launched: 17 September 1896
- Completed: April 1898
- Commissioned: 15 April 1898
- Decommissioned: 21 April 1919
- Fate: Sold for scrapping 18 June 1920

General characteristics
- Class & type: Majestic-class pre-dreadnought battleship
- Displacement: 16,060 long tons (16,320 t)
- Length: 421 ft (128 m)
- Beam: 75 ft (23 m)
- Draught: 27 ft (8.2 m)
- Installed power: 8 × Scotch marine boilers; 10,000 ihp (7,500 kW)
- Propulsion: 2 × triple-expansion steam engines; 2 × screw propellers
- Speed: 16 kn (30 km/h; 18 mph)
- Complement: 672
- Armament: 4 × BL 12 in (305 mm) guns; 12 × QF 6 in (152 mm) guns; 16 × 12 pounder (76 mm) guns; 12 × 3 pounder (47 mm) quick-firing guns; 5 × 18 in (457 mm) torpedo tubes
- Armour: Belt armour: 9 in (229 mm); Deck: 2.5 to 4.5 in (64 to 114 mm); Barbettes: 14 in (356 mm); Conning tower: 14 inches

The third HMS Illustrious of the British Royal Navy was a Majestic-class pre-dreadnought battleship. The ship was built at the Chatham Dockyard; her keel was laid down in March 1895, her completed hull was launched in September 1896, and she was commissioned into the fleet in April 1898. She was armed with a main battery of four 12-inch (305 mm) guns and a secondary battery of twelve 6-inch (152 mm) guns. The ship had a top speed of 16 knots (30 km/h; 18 mph).

Illustrious was assigned to the Mediterranean Fleet until 1904. Transferred to the Channel Fleet (which was subsequently reorganised to the Atlantic Fleet) she underwent a refit which was duly completed in early 1906. Rendered obsolete by the emergence of the new dreadnoughts, she served with the Home Fleet from 1908. One of the oldest battleships in the Royal Navy when the First World War broke out, she served as a guard ship at various regions around Northern England until late 1915. Her main armament was removed and she then served as a store ship for the remainder of the war. She was decommissioned in 1919 and scrapped the following year.

== Design ==
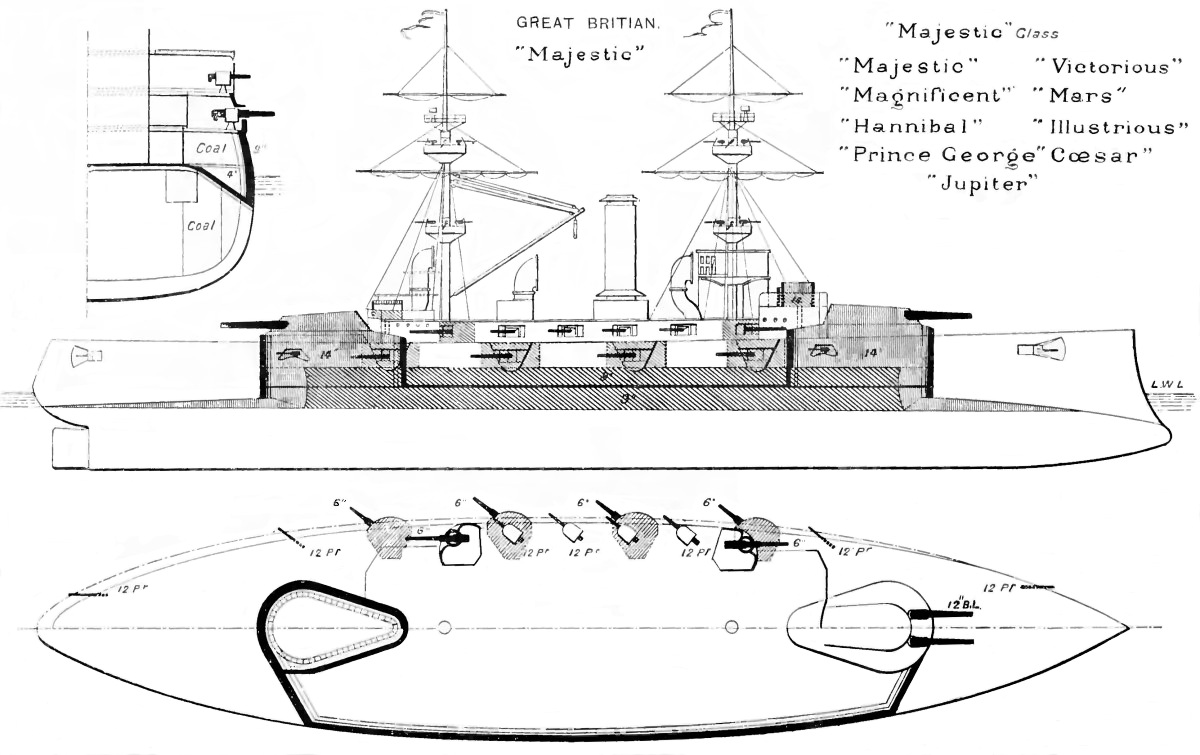
Right elevation, deck plan, and hull section as depicted in Brassey's Naval Annual 1902

Illustrious was 421 feet (128 m) long overall and had a beam of 75 ft (23 m) and a draft of 27 ft (8.2 m). She displaced up to 16,060 long tons (16,320 t) at full load. Her propulsion system consisted of two 3-cylinder triple-expansion steam engines powered by eight coal-fired, cylindrical fire-tube Scotch marine boilers. By 1907–1908, she was re-boilered with oil-fired models. Her engines provided a top speed of 16 knots (30 km/h; 18 mph) at 10,000 indicated horsepower (7,500 kW). The Majestics were considered good seaboats with an easy roll and good steamers, although they suffered from high fuel consumption. She had a crew of 672 officers and ratings.

The ship was armed with a main battery of four BL 12-inch (305 mm) Mk VIII guns in twin-gun turrets, one forward and one aft. The turrets were placed on circular barbettes, unlike six of her sisters, which retained earlier pear-shaped barbettes. Illustrious also carried a secondary battery of twelve QF 6-inch (152 mm) /40 guns. They were mounted in casemates in two gun decks amidships. She also carried sixteen QF 12-pounder guns and twelve QF 2-pounder guns for defence against torpedo boats. She was also equipped with five 18 in (457 mm) torpedo tubes, four of which were submerged in the ship's hull, with the last in a deck-mounted launcher.

Illustrious and the other ships of her class had 9 inches (229 mm) of Harvey steel in their belt armour, which allowed equal protection with less cost in weight compared to previous types of armour. This allowed Illustrious and her sisters to have a deeper and lighter belt than previous battleships without any loss in protection. The barbettes for the main battery were protected with 14 in (356 mm) of armour, and the conning tower had the same thickness of steel on the sides. The ship's armoured deck was 2.5 to 4.5 in (64 to 114 mm) thick.

== Service history ==
The keel for HMS Illustrious was laid down at the Chatham Dockyard on 11 March 1895 and the ship was launched on 17 September 1896. She commissioned at Chatham for service in the Fleet Reserve on 15 April 1898, Captain Sir Richard Poore in command. She went into full commission there on 10 May 1898 for service in the Mediterranean Fleet.

While in the Mediterranean, Illustrious participated between September and December 1898 in the operations at Crete of the International Squadron, a multinational force made up initially of ships of the Austro-Hungarian Navy, French Navy, Imperial German Navy, Italian Royal Navy (Regia Marina), Imperial Russian Navy, and Royal Navy that intervened between February 1897 and December 1898 in the 1897-1898 Greek Christian uprising against the Ottoman Empire′s rule on the island. By the time Illustrious joined the squadron, Austria-Hungary and the German Empire had withdrawn from the squadron, but the other four countries remained active in it. Its senior admirals formed an "Admirals Council" that governed Crete during the intervention, and the admirals decided in early September 1898 that the British should take control of the customs house at Candia (now Heraklion) in order to exact an export duty to fund the administration of the island. This resulted in a violent riot by Cretan Turks against British soldiers, sailors, and Christian civilians in Candia on 6 September 1898, which in turn prompted a flood of reinforcements to the town by the International Squadron. Illustrious was among the ships that arrived in the harbour in mid-September 1898 to help maintain order in the wake of the riot.

Captain Frank Finnis was appointed in command in February 1900, and in 1901 she underwent a refit at Malta. Captain Francis John Foley was appointed in command on 24 March 1902, and the following June she was the lead ship in a coronation fête at Gibraltar. In February 1903 she left Malta for Platanias, accompanied by HMS Caesar, HMS London and HMS Myrmidon. In July 1904, Illustrious transferred to the Channel Fleet. As a result of a reorganisation on 1 January 1905, the Channel Fleet became the Atlantic Fleet, and she became an Atlantic Fleet ship. Illustrious ended her Atlantic Fleet service in September 1905 and began a refit at Chatham.

Emerging from the refit, she commissioned into the Reserve at Chatham on 14 March 1906, then went into full commission for service in the new Channel Fleet (formerly the Home Fleet) on 3 April 1906, serving as Flagship, Rear Admiral. She collided with schooner Christa in the English Channel in fog on 13 June 1906. She was relieved as flagship and ended her Channel Fleet service on 1 June 1908, paying off at Chatham. Illustrious recommissioned at Chatham on 2 June 1908 for service with the Portsmouth Division of the new Home Fleet. On 22 March 1909 she collided with third-class cruiser HMS Amethyst in Portsmouth Harbour, but suffered no damage. She suffered another mishap on 21 August 1909 when she damaged her bottom by striking a reef in Babbacombe Bay. She underwent a refit in 1912, and later that year was transferred to the 3rd Fleet and participated in manoeuvres as Flagship, Vice Admiral, 7th Battle Squadron. (Note: According to Conway's All the World's Fighting Ships 1906–1921, Illustrious flew the flag of the Vice Admiral, 2nd Battle Squadron at this time.)

In late July 1914, the Royal Navy began a precautionary mobilisation, as war seemed imminent. The Majestic-class ships were by then the oldest and least effective battleships in service in the Royal Navy. At first, it was planned that Illustrious would pay off to provide crewmen for the new dreadnought battleship HMS Erin, but instead she was placed in full commission to serve as a guard ship for the Grand Fleet once the First World War began in August 1914. She began guard ship duty at Loch Ewe on 23 August 1914, transferring to Loch Na Keal on 17 October 1914, to the Tyne in November 1914, and to Grimsby on the Humber in December 1914. She remained on guard ship duty on the Humber until November 1915. (Note: According to Conway's All the World's Fighting Ships 1906–1921, Illustrious was in the "Southern Fleet" after May 1915.)

Illustrious paid off at Grimsby on 26 November 1915 to be converted to a disarmed harbour ship; two of her 12-inch (305-mm) guns were re-used in the Tyne Turrets. Her conversion was completed in March 1916. She served at Grimsby in her new role until August 1916, when she transferred to Chatham. Illustrious commissioned there on 20 November 1916 for use as a munitions storeship, and on 24 November 1916 she transferred to the Tyne to serve in this role. In November 1917, she transferred to Portsmouth to continue service as a munitions storeship there. Illustrious paid off on 21 April 1919 and was placed on the sale list at Portsmouth on 24 March 1920. She was sold for scrapping on 18 June 1920, and was broken up at Barrow.
