= HMS General Craufurd =

Lord Clive-class monitors in the Royal Navy

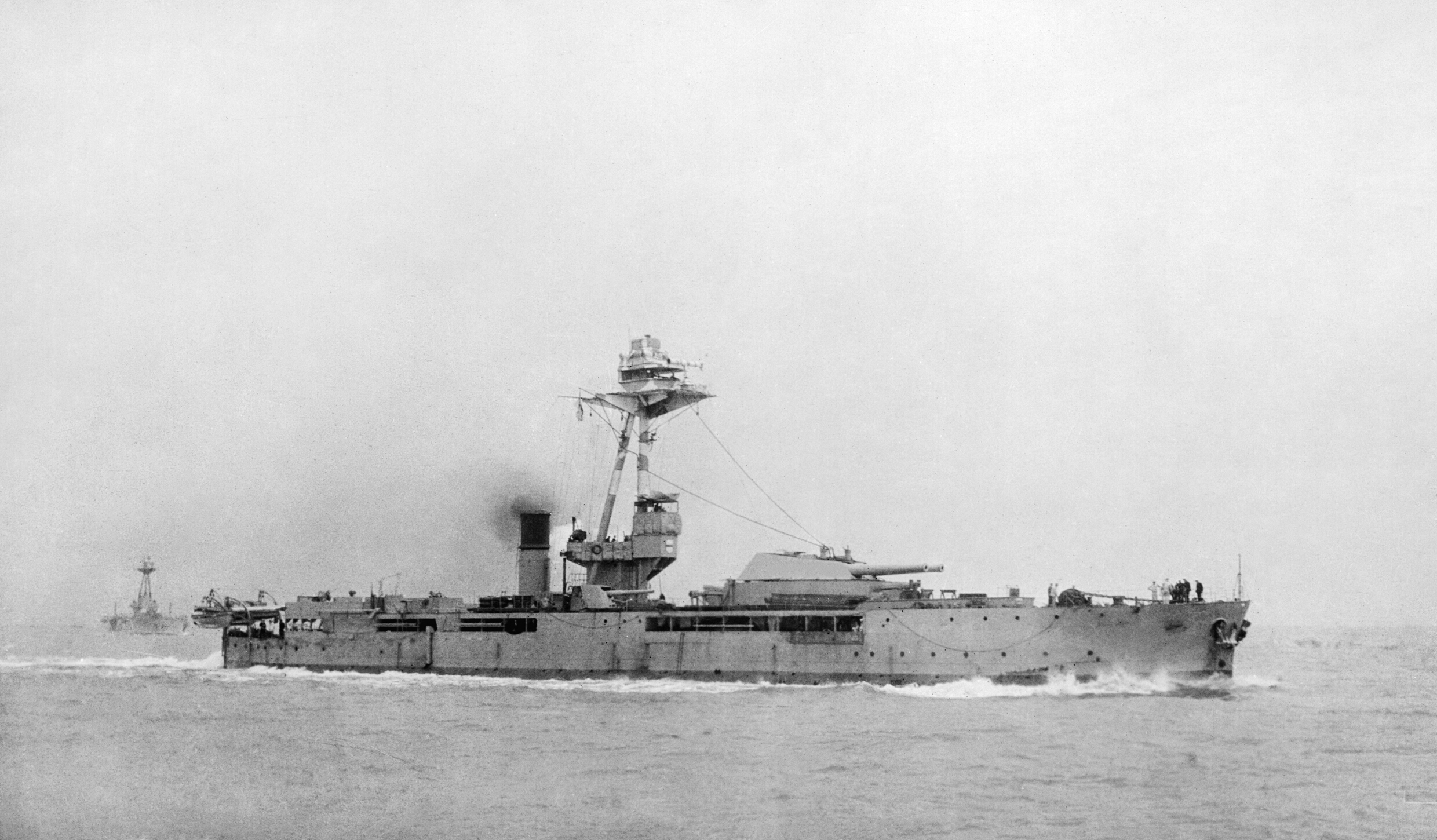
- General Craufurd at sea

History

United Kingdom
- Name: General Craufurd
- Namesake: General Robert Craufurd
- Builder: Harland and Wolff, Belfast
- Yard number: 479
- Laid down: 9 January 1915
- Launched: 8 July 1915
- Completed: 26 August 1915
- Fate: Sold for scrap, 9 May 1921

General characteristics (as built)
- Class & type: Lord Clive-class monitor
- Displacement: 5,850 long tons (5,944 t) (deep load)
- Length: 335 ft 6 in (102.3 m)
- Beam: 87 ft 2 in (26.6 m)
- Draught: 9 ft 11 in (3.02 m)
- Installed power: 2 water-tube boilers; 2,310 ihp (1,720 kW)
- Propulsion: 2 shafts; 2 triple-expansion steam engines
- Speed: 7 knots (13 km/h; 8.1 mph) (service)
- Endurance: 1,100 nmi (2,000 km; 1,300 mi) at 6.5 knots (12 km/h; 7 mph)
- Complement: 194
- Armament: 1 × twin 12 in (305 mm) guns; 1 × single 3 in (76 mm)) AA gun; 2 × single 12 pdr 3 in (76 mm) guns; 1 × single 3 pdr (47 mm (1.9 in)) AA gun
- Armour: Belt: 6 in (152 mm); Bulkheads: 6 in (152 mm); Turret face: 10.5 in (267 mm); Turret sides 5.5 in (140 mm); Barbette: 8 in (203 mm); Conning tower: 6 in (152 mm); Deck: 1–2 in (25–51 mm)

HMS General Craufurd was the one of eight Lord Clive-class monitors built for the Royal Navy during World War I. Their primary armament was taken from obsolete pre-dreadnought battleships. The ship spent the war in the English Channel bombarding German positions along the Belgian coast as part of the Dover Patrol. She participated in the failed First and Second Ostend Raids in 1918, bombarding the defending coastal artillery as the British attempted to block the Bruges–Ostend Canal. Later that year General Craufurd supported the coastal battles during the Hundred Days Offensive until the Germans evacuated coastal Belgium in mid-October. The ship was decommissioned almost immediately after the war ended the following month, but she was reactivated in 1920 to serve as a gunnery training ship for a year. General Craufurd was sold for scrap in 1921.

== Design ==
All of the British monitors built during the war were intended to bombard land targets. To this end the Lord Clive class were given a heavy armament modified to increase its range and a shallow draught to allow them to work inshore as necessary. As the Royal Navy did not expect the ships to engage in naval combat, speed was very much not a priority. General Craufurd had an overall length of 335 feet 6 inches (102.3 m), a beam of 87 feet 2 inches (26.6 m) including the torpedo bulge, 57 feet (17.4 m) without, and a draught of 9 feet 11 inches (3.02 m) at deep load. She displaced 5,850 long tons (5,940 t) at deep load and her crew numbered 12 officers and 182 ratings. The ship was powered by a pair of four-cylinder Harland & Wolff triple-expansion steam engines, each driving one propeller shaft using steam provided by two water-tube boilers. The engines were designed to produce a total of 2,310 indicated horsepower (1,720 kW) which was intended to give her a maximum speed of 10 knots (18.5 km/h; 11.5 mph). On her sea trials General Craufurd only made 7.42 knots (13.7 km/h; 8.5 mph) because her designers were unfamiliar with the proper way to contour her hull to maximise her propeller efficiency; the ship reached 7 knots (13.0 km/h; 8.1 mph) in service as she was more heavily loaded. The monitor carried 356 long tons (362 t) of coal which gave her a range of 1,100 nautical miles (2,000 km; 1,300 mi) at 6.5 knots (12.0 km/h; 7.5 mph).

=== Armament, fire control, and armour ===
The Lord Clives mounted two BL 12-inch (305 mm) Mk VIII guns in a single hydraulically powered gun turret which came from the Majestic-class predreadnought battleships; General Craufurd received hers from Magnificent. To suit their new role as long-range bombardment weapons, the turrets were modified to increase the maximum elevation of the guns from 13.5° to 30°. Their secondary armament consisted of a pair of quick-firing (QF) 12-pounder (3 in (76 mm)) guns on low-angle mounts. Anti-aircraft defence was provided by a single QF 3-inch 20-cwt gun (Note: "Cwt" is the abbreviation for hundredweight, 20 cwt referring to the weight of the gun.) and a QF 2-pounder (40 mm (1.6 in)) Mk I gun.

The spotting top on the tripod mast between the turret and the funnel housed a rangefinder that fed data to the director on the roof of the spotting top. The director's crew would calculate the amount of traverse and elevation needed to hit the target and transmit that information to the turret for the guns to follow.

The Lord Clive-class ships were protected against gunfire by a sloping waterline belt amidships of 6-inch (152 mm) Krupp cemented armour (KCA) that was closed off at its ends by transverse bulkheads of equal thicknesses to form the ships' central armoured citadel. The 2-inch-thick (51 mm) upper deck of high-tensile steel served as the roof of the citadel and the forecastle deck above it consisted of 1-inch (25 mm) plates of high-tensile steel. For protection against torpedoes, the ships were fitted with bulges 15 feet (4.6 m) deep.

The turret taken from Magnificent retained its original armour, viz. 10.5-inch-thick (270 mm) faces and 5.5-inch (140 mm) sides with a 2-inch roof, all of Harvey armour. Its original circular barbettes was replaced by a new one formed from a dozen plates of 8-inch (203 mm) KCA. The ships were also fitted with a cast-steel conning tower just forward of the barbette that had 6-inch sides and a roof 2.5 inches (64 mm) thick.

=== Wartime modifications ===
Four QF 6-inch guns with 200 rounds per gun were added in early 1916 abreast the funnel when it was realized that the two 12-pounder guns were not powerful enough to defend the ship from German destroyers. Two coal bunkers were turned into magazines for them, reducing the range to approximately 960 nmi (1,780 km; 1,100 mi), and increasing the crew in size to 215, necessitating plating in the sides of much of the upper deck to provide quarters. These guns were later exchanged for longer-ranged 6-inch Mk VII guns. The 3-pounder gun was replaced by another QF 3-inch 20-cwt anti-aircraft gun late in the war.

== Construction and career ==
General Craufurd, named after General Robert Craufurd, commander of the British Light Division during the early years of the Peninsular War who was killed in action at the siege of Ciudad Rodrigo in 1812, has been the only ship of her name to serve in the Royal Navy. She was laid down with the name M.7 on 9 January 1915 at Harland & Wolff's Berth no. 3 in its shipyard in Belfast, Northern Ireland, as yard number 479 and was renamed General Craufurd on 8 March. The ship was launched on 8 July and completed on 26 August at an estimated cost of about £260,000.

She participated in a bombardment of the German naval base at Ostend, Belgium on 7 September, but Vice-Admiral Reginald Bacon had to order a withdrawal after his flagship, General Craufurd's sister ship, Lord Clive, was hit four times in quick succession by a previously unknown artillery battery. General Craufurd and her three sisters had only managed to shoot 14 rounds before they had to retire, which only started a fire in the dockyard. On the 25th General Craufurd and her sister Prince Eugene bombarded German positions at Zeebrugge, Belgium, as part of a deception operation to suggest that the Allies were launching an attack in that sector. During the remainder of September and October, she occasionally fired on German coastal batteries. On 15 November General Craufurd and the seaplane carrier Riviera were sent to the Thames Estuary where they could develop techniques to allow aircraft to correct the shooting of multiple monitors via Wireless in an area that had been laid out to replicate some of the features of the Belgian coast.

=== 1916 ===
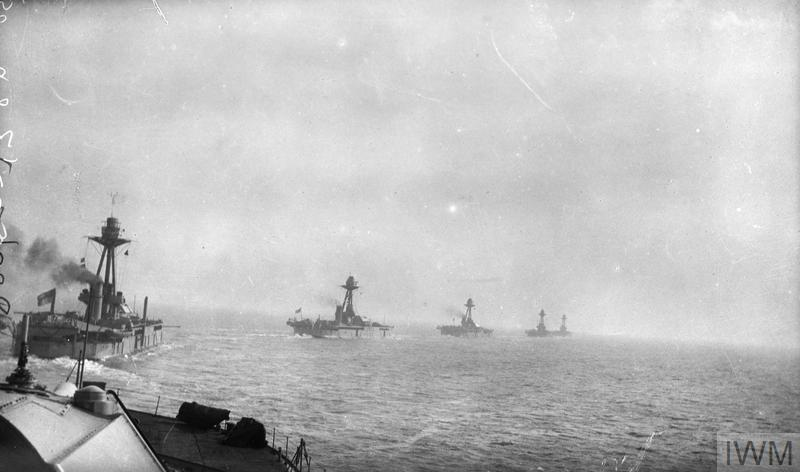
Lord Clive leading the six 12-inch monitors of the Dover Patrol, possibly in September 1916. Taken from Prince Rupert, showing (from left to right) Sir John Moore, Prince Eugene, General Craufurd, and General Wolfe.

During December 1915 and January 1916, General Craufurd was stationed in the Thames Estuary as a propaganda exercise to shoot down approaching German Zeppelins with shrapnel shells fired by her main guns, but the Zeppelins never came within range. The monitors bombarded German batteries at Westende, Belgium, on 26 January to evaluate the newly developed air-spotting techniques, but each ship only fired about eleven rounds during the half-hour bombardment. This was the last bombardment for the next seven months as the monitors were used to support British light forces and the Dover Barrage, the complex of minefields and nets in the Channel.

The uncluttered forecastle deck of the Lord Clives allowed Bacon to use General Craufurd to ferry three 50-long-ton (51 t) BL 12-inch Mk X gun barrels and three 28-long-ton (28 t) BL 9.2-inch (234 mm) Mk X barrels to Dunkirk, France, to be used to bombard the German coastal artillery. The barrels were loaded by crane onto chocks positioned on General Craufurd's portside deck and were then rolled off the deck via a thick wooden ramp onto the stone jetty in Dunkirk. The first barrel was difficult to unload because it was thinner at the muzzle than at the breech and wanted to curve as it rolled. Subsequent barrels were encased in wood to make them easier to roll. General Craufurd delivered the first gun in April and then the rest beginning in July.

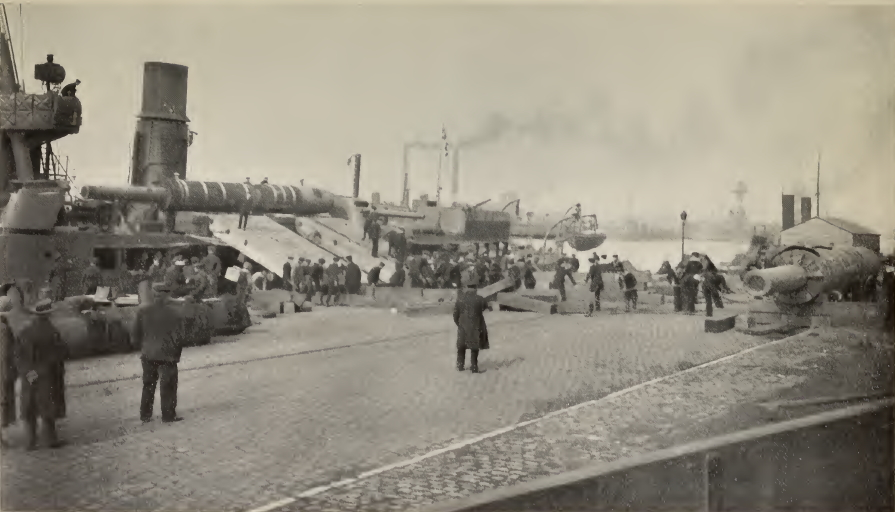
One of the second batch of 12-inch guns being unloaded in July; note the wooden jacket around the middle of the barrel

In August the monitor began trials to develop procedures for engaging targets at night while using a gyroscope hooked up to her fire-control system to help maintain the turret on the target while manoeuvring. She fired 38 round at Middlekerk on 16 August as part of these trials. Four days later a Short Type 184 floatplane was hoisted aboard to spot the ship's shells and transmit corrections; low cloud cover that prevented the observer aboard the aircraft from seeing any targets. This infuriated Bacon and he prohibited Commander Edward Altham from conducting any more experiments. To add insult to injury, Bacon limited General Craufurd's participation in the diversionary bombardment conducted in support of the Battle of the Somme in early September to only seven rounds spread over the seven days of the operation. This was the last bombardment of 1916 as the monitors reverted to their role of supporting the Dover Barrage and patrolling between Calais and The Downs.

=== 1917–1921 ===
General Craufurd was intended to be used during the Great Landing, a plan to land troops between Westende and Middelkerke to exploit the anticipated Allied gains made during the Battle of Passchendaele in July and pocket German troops between the landing and the advancing troops. The troops were to be landed via three enormous 2,500-long-ton (2,500 t) pontoons, each of which could carry a brigade of infantry, an artillery battery and three tanks. Each of the pontoons was lashed in position between two monitors and General Craufurd, together with General Wolfe, was modified in early 1917 to handle one of them. The ship and her sisters rehearsed their role up until mid-July when the battle began, but the Allies could not make the ten-mile (16 km) advance necessary to launch the operation. Field Marshal Haig refused to support Bacon's proposal for a more modest landing in the Nieuport-Middelkerke area in September, so the operation was cancelled on 2 October. General Craufurd was then docked at HM Dockyard, Portsmouth, for maintenance and repairs. Beginning in November, the monitors returned to their normal wintertime role of defending the barrage.

Four of the 12-inch monitors, including General Craufurd, were tasked to support the attempt to block the entrance to the Ostend-Bruges Canal that led to the naval base at Bruges by bombarding the coastal artillery defending the port. Before the first attempt on 11 April had to be called off because the wind shifted and the required smoke screen couldn't be laid properly, the monitors had already fired 50 rounds between them. A second attempt was cancelled because of bad weather. During the third attempt of 23 April, which failed when the blockships ran aground, General Craufurd fired about fifty rounds of 12-inch and some 6-inch shells and was near missed in return by the German guns. The monitor played a minor role in another attempt on 9/10 May when she buoyed the approach channel, but the blockship was blinded by smoke and failed to arrive at her intended position at the canal entrance.

The night before the Fifth Battle of Ypres began on 28 September, the monitors bombarded targets along the coast to simulate preparations for an amphibious landing and then switched to other targets after dawn. General Craufurd and the other monitors were tasked to bombard the German lines of communication, firing slowly to keep up a steady pressure. During the day each ship fired about one hundred 12-inch shells and had fired sixty rounds from their secondary armament during the previous night. The bombardment continued at a slower pace for the next five days, but ceased when the Allied advance stopped. When it resumed on 14 October in the Battle of Courtrai, the monitors resumed their task until the Germans evacuated the coast a few days later.

With the war over on 11 November, the monitors were no longer needed and were soon decommissioned. General Craufurd was the first to go and was paid off on the 15th. She was recommissioned as a gunnery training ship in January 1919 and was offered for sale to the Kingdom of Romania. Nothing came of the offer and the monitor was paid off again in early 1920. General Craufurd was sold for scrap to Thos. W. Ward on 9 May 1921 for approximately £11,035, although she did not arrive at the ship breakers until 10 September 1923.

== Bibliography ==
- Bacon, Reginald (1919). The Dover Patrol 1915-1917. (2 vols.). New York: George H. Doran Co. OCLC 1136826. Vol. 1 • Vol. 2
- Buxton, Ian (2008) [1978]. Big Gun Monitors: Design, Construction and Operations 1914–1945 (2nd Revised ed.). Barnsley, UK: Seaforth Publishing. ISBN 978-1-84415-719-8.
- Colledge, J. J.; Warlow, Ben (2006) [1969]. Ships of the Royal Navy: The Complete Record of All Fighting Ships of the Royal Navy from the 15th Century to the Present (3rd Rev ed.). London: Chatham Publishing. ISBN 978-1-86176-281-8. OCLC 67375475.
- Crossley, Jim (2013). Monitors of the Royal Navy; How the Fleet Brought the Great Guns to Bear. Barnsley, UK: Pen & Sword. ISBN 978-1-78383-004-6.
- Dunn, Steve R. (2017). Securing the Narrow Sea: The Dover Patrol 1914–1918. Barnsley, UK: Seaforth Publishing. ISBN 978-1-84832-251-6.
- Preston, Antony (1985). "Great Britain and Empire Forces". In Gray, Randal (ed.). Conway's All the World's Fighting Ships 1906–1921. Annapolis, Maryland: Naval Institute Press. pp. 1–104. ISBN 0-85177-245-5.
