= HMS Victorious (1895) =

Pre-dreadnought battleship of the British Royal Navy

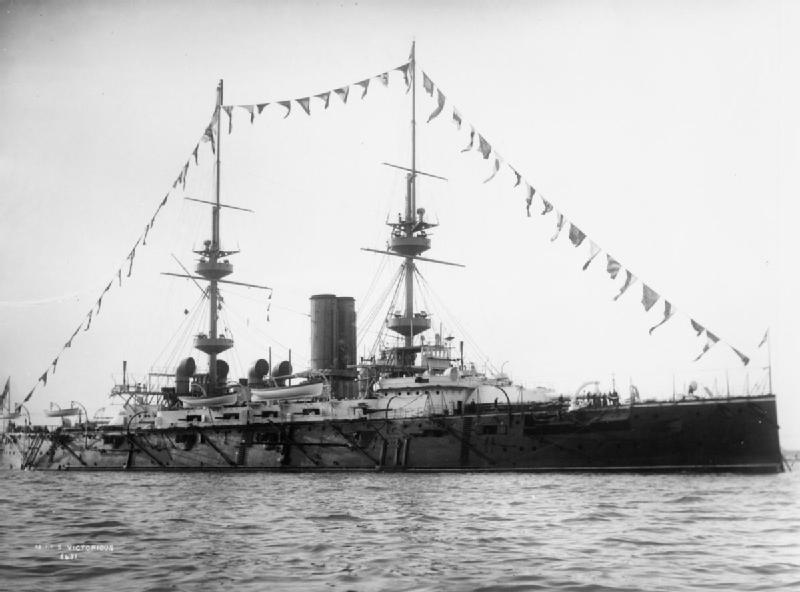
- HMS Victorious in 1898

History

United Kingdom
- Name: HMS Victorious
- Ordered: 1893–1894 Naval Estimates
- Builder: Chatham Dockyard
- Laid down: 28 May 1894
- Launched: 19 October 1895
- Completed: November 1896
- Commissioned: 4 November 1896
- Decommissioned: 28 March 1920
- Fate: Sold for scrapping 9 April 1923

General characteristics
- Class & type: Majestic-class pre-dreadnought battleship
- Displacement: 16,060 long tons (16,320 t)
- Length: 421 ft (128 m)
- Beam: 75 ft (23 m)
- Draught: 27 ft (8.2 m)
- Installed power: 8 × Scotch marine boilers; 10,000 ihp (7,500 kW)
- Propulsion: 2 × triple-expansion steam engines; 2 × screw propellers
- Speed: 16 kn (30 km/h; 18 mph)
- Complement: 672
- Armament: 4 × BL 12 in (305 mm) guns; 12 × QF 6 in (152 mm) guns; 16 × 12 pounder (76 mm) guns; 12 × 3 pounder (47 mm) quick-firing guns; 5 × 18 in (457 mm) torpedo tubes
- Armour: Belt armor: 9 in (229 mm); Deck: 2.5 to 4.5 in (64 to 114 mm); Barbettes: 14 in (356 mm); Conning tower: 14 inches

HMS Victorious was one of nine Majestic-class pre-dreadnought battleships of the British Royal Navy. She was armed with a main battery of four 12-inch (305 mm) guns in two twin turrets, and was capable of a top speed of 16 knots (30 km/h; 18 mph). She served primarily on home waters, and participated in the Fleet Review for the Diamond Jubilee for Queen Victoria in 1897. She served briefly in the Mediterranean in 1898 before being transferred to the China Station later that year; Victorious remained in East Asian waters until 1900, when she returned to the Mediterranean.

After returning to the United Kingdom in 1904, Victorious served as the second flagship of the Channel Fleet. She remained in active service with the fleet in various units until 1908, when she was modernized and then placed in reserve. At the outbreak of the First World War in August 1914 she was mobilized with three of her sister ships into the 9th Battle Squadron, though by January 1915 she was again withdrawn from front-line service. In September her main guns were removed to arm a pair of monitors. Victorious was subsequently used as a repair ship. After the end of the war she was renamed Indus II; plans to use her as a harbor ship were cancelled and, in April 1923, she was sold for scrap.

== Design ==
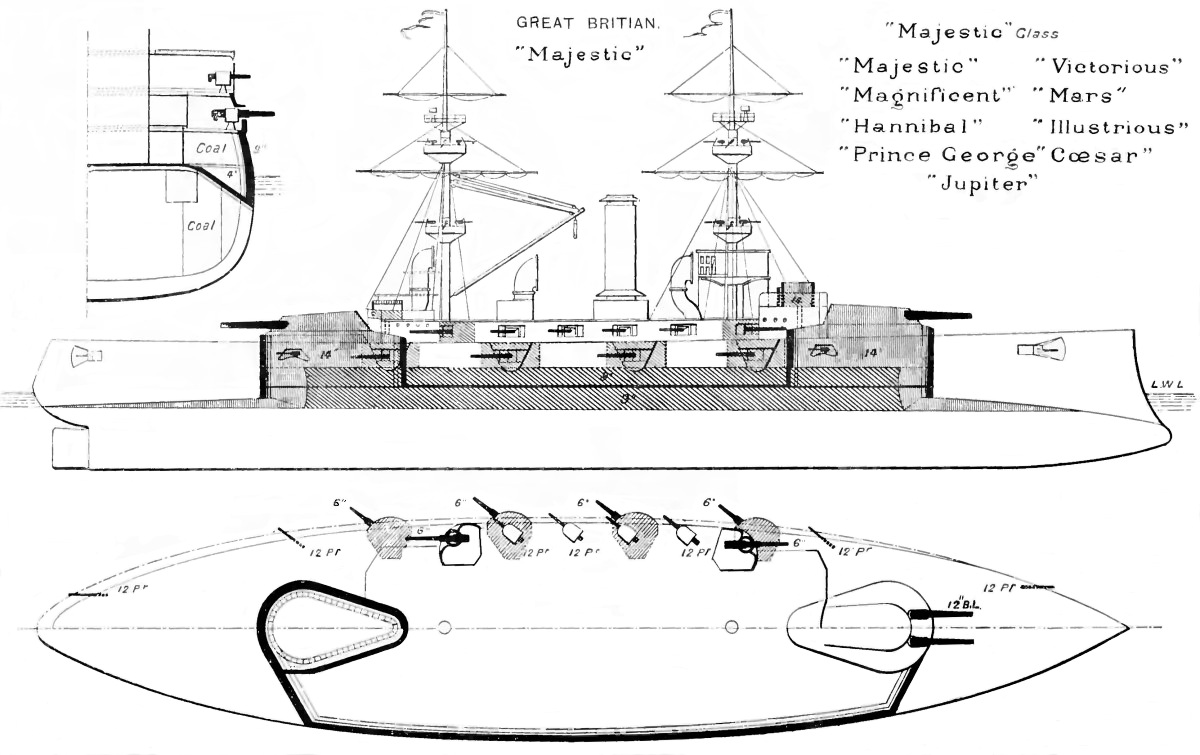
Right elevation, deck plan, and hull section as depicted in Brassey's Naval Annual 1902

Victorious was 421 feet (128 m) long overall and had a beam of 75 ft (23 m) and a draft of 27 ft (8.2 m). She displaced up to 16,060 long tons (16,320 t) at full load. Her propulsion system consisted of two 3-cylinder triple-expansion steam engines powered by eight coal-fired, cylindrical fire-tube Scotch marine boilers. By 1907–1908 she was re-boilered with oil-fired models. Her engines provided a top speed of 16 knots (30 km/h; 18 mph) at 10,000 indicated horsepower (7,500 kW). The Majestics were considered good seaboats with an easy roll and good steamers, although they suffered from high fuel consumption. She had a crew of 672 officers and ratings.

The ship was armed with a main battery of four BL 12-inch (305 mm) Mk VIII guns in twin-gun turrets, one forward and one aft. The turrets were placed on pear-shaped barbettes; six of her sisters had the same arrangement, but her sisters Caesar and Illustrious and all future British battleship classes had circular barbettes. Victorious also carried a secondary battery of twelve QF 6-inch (152 mm) /40 guns. They were mounted in casemates in two gun decks amidships. She also carried sixteen QF 12-pounder guns and twelve QF 2-pounder guns for defence against torpedo boats. She was also equipped with five 18 in (457 mm) torpedo tubes, four of which were submerged in the ship's hull, with the last in a deck-mounted launcher.

Victorious and the other ships of her class had 9 inches (229 mm) of Harvey steel in their belt armour, which allowed equal protection with less cost in weight compared to previous types of armour. This allowed Victorious and her sisters to have a deeper and lighter belt than previous battleships without any loss in protection. The barbettes for the main battery were protected with 14 in (356 mm) of armor, while the conning tower had the same thickness of steel on the sides. The ship's armored deck was 2.5 to 4.5 in (64 to 114 mm) thick.

== Operational history ==
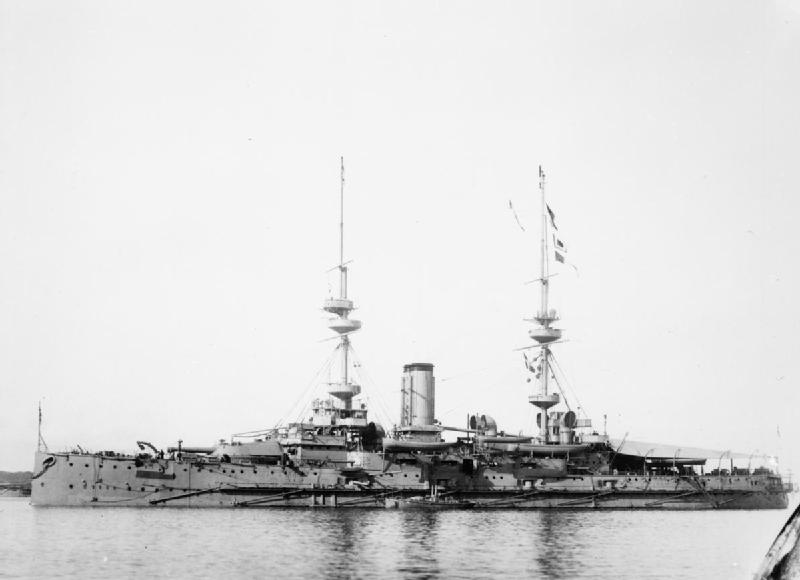
Victorious underway c. 1903

Victorious was laid down at the Chatham Dockyard on 28 May 1894, launched on 19 October 1895—after which fitting-out work commenced. She was commissioned into the Royal Navy about a year later, on 4 November 1896, for service in the Fleet Reserve at Chatham Dockyard. On 8 June 1897 she went into full commission for service in the Mediterranean Fleet. Before leaving the United Kingdom, she was present at the Fleet Review at Spithead for the Diamond Jubilee of Queen Victoria on 26 June 1897. She moved to the Mediterranean where she relieved the battleship Anson. In February 1898 Victorious was detached from the Mediterranean Fleet for service on the China Station. On 16 February she ran hard aground while entering the harbor at Port Said en route to China. Several tugs attempted to free her but were unable; pump dredgers were needed to shift the sediment around the hull to get her free. She was successfully refloated on 18 February.

In 1900, she returned to the Mediterranean and underwent a refit at Malta. Under the command of Captain Charles Henry Cross, she took part in combined manoeuvres off Cephalonia and Morea in late September and early October 1902. Her Mediterranean service over, Victorious was paid off at Chatham on 8 August 1903 and began a refit there that lasted until February 1904. Victorious was recommissioned at Devonport on 2 February 1904 to serve as second flagship of the Channel Fleet. On 14 July 1904 the torpedo boat TB 113 rammed her at Hamoaze, slightly damaging her. When under a reorganization on 1 January 1905, the Channel Fleet became the new Atlantic Fleet, and Victorious became an Atlantic Fleet unit.

Captain Robert Falcon Scott, the Antarctic explorer, served as her Captain, acting as Flag Captain to Rear-Admiral George Egerton aboard her, for a period in 1906. Her Atlantic Fleet service ended when she paid off at Devonport on 31 December 1906. On 1 January 1907 Victorious was recommissioned to serve at the Nore as part of the Nore Division of the new Home Fleet. She underwent a refit at Chatham in 1908 in which she was converted to burn fuel oil and had main battery fire control and radio installed. She was reduced to a nucleus crew, in commission in reserve, in March 1909. Victorious was transferred to the Devonport Division, Home Fleet, in January 1911, and to the 3rd Fleet in May 1912. She damaged her sternwalk in a collision with her sister ship Majestic in fog on 14 July 1912 and began a short refit at Chatham in December 1913. (Note: According to Conway's All the World's Fighting Ships 1906–1921, however, this collision happened in June 1910. See Preston, p. 7.)

=== First World War ===
In July 1914, the Royal Navy began a precautionary mobilisation as war began to seem imminent. As part of this, Victorious and her sister ships Hannibal, Mars, and Magnificent, formed the 9th Battle Squadron on 27 July 1914, stationed at the Humber to defend the British coast; Victorious remained there as guard ship after the 9th Battle Squadron was dissolved on 7 August 1914. In December 1914 she transferred to the Tyne to serve as guard ship there. On 4 January 1915 Victorious paid off at Elswick. The Majestic-class ships were by then the oldest and least effective battleships in service in the Royal Navy; Victorious was laid up on the Tyne February until September 1915 and her 12-inch (305-mm) guns were removed for use aboard the new Lord Clive-class monitors Prince Rupert and General Wolfe. Between September 1915 and February 1916, Palmers converted her into a repair ship at Jarrow.

The converted Victorious was commissioned as a repair ship on 22 February 1916 and arrived at Scapa Flow to replace the converted merchant ship Caribbean, which had been lost in September 1915, as repair ship for the Grand Fleet. Victorious performed this role there until March 1920 when she was renamed Indus II and transferred to Devonport for a refit to prepare her for service with the Indus Establishment. She arrived at Devonport on 28 March 1920 and paid off into a care and maintenance status while she awaited the beginning of her refit. Plans for the refit, however, were cancelled; work began to convert her into a harbor depot ship but, in April 1922, that conversion was cancelled before it could be completed and she was placed on the disposal list that month. Indus II was sold for scrapping on 19 December 1922, but the sale was cancelled on 1 March 1923. She was again sold on 9 April 1923 and was towed from Devonport to Dover to be scrapped.
