= HMS Mars (1896) =

Pre-dreadnought battleship of the British Royal Navy

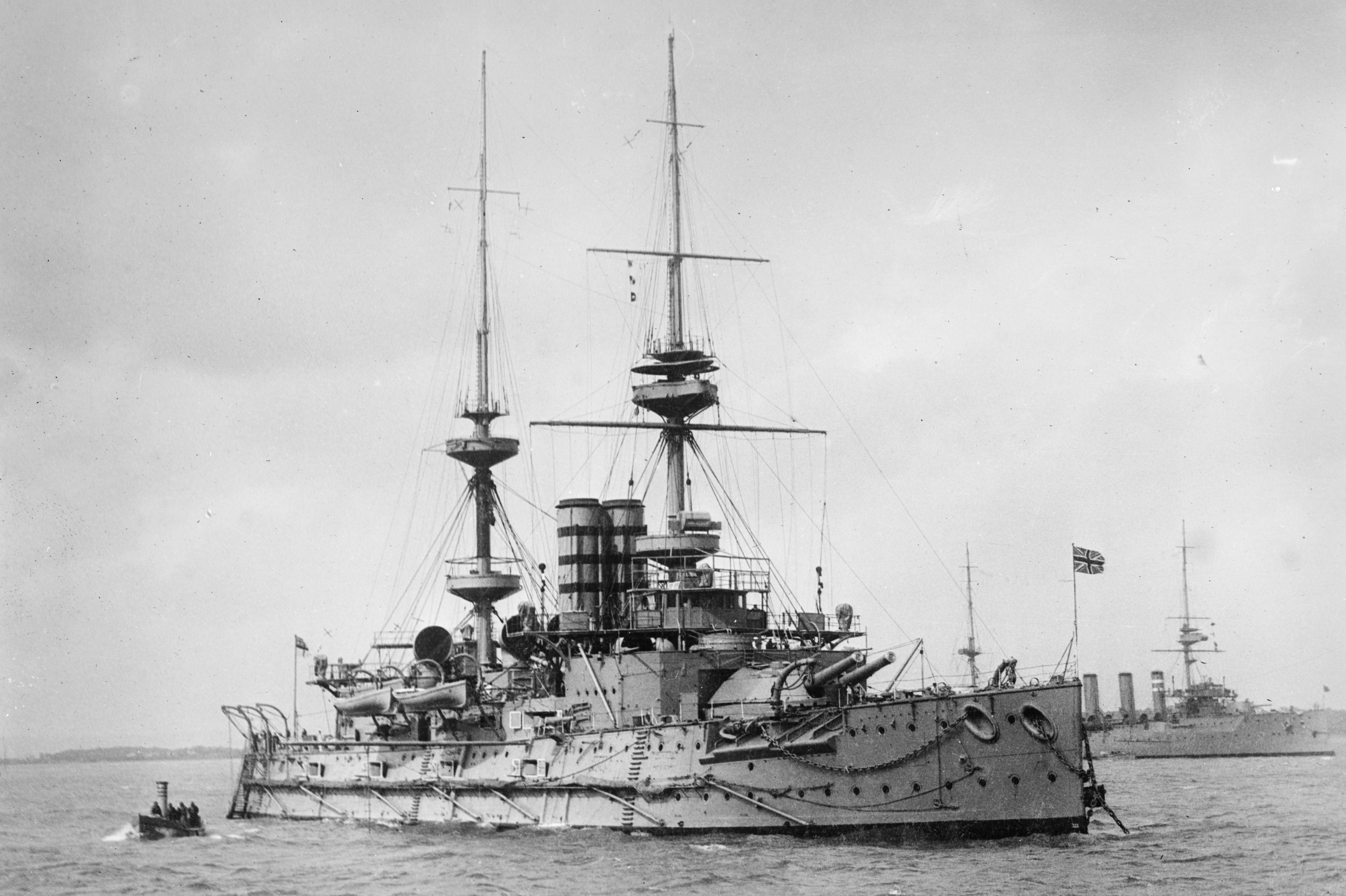
- HMS Mars at anchor

History

United Kingdom
- Namesake: Mars, the Roman god of war
- Builder: Laird Brothers, Birkenhead
- Laid down: 2 June 1894
- Launched: 30 March 1896
- Completed: June 1897
- Commissioned: 8 June 1897
- Decommissioned: 7 July 1920
- Fate: Sold for scrapping 9 May 1921

General characteristics
- Class & type: Majestic-class pre-dreadnought battleship
- Displacement: 16,060 long tons (16,320 t)
- Length: 421 ft (128 m)
- Beam: 75 ft (23 m)
- Draught: 27 ft (8.2 m)
- Installed power: 8 × Scotch marine boilers; 10,000 ihp (7,500 kW)
- Propulsion: 2 × triple-expansion steam engines; 2 × screw propellers
- Speed: 16 kn (30 km/h; 18 mph)
- Complement: 672
- Armament: 4 × BL 12 in (305 mm) guns; 12 × QF 6 in (152 mm) guns; 16 × 12 pounder (76 mm) guns; 12 × 3 pounder (47 mm) quick-firing guns; 5 × 18 in (457 mm) torpedo tubes
- Armour: Belt armour: 9 in (229 mm); Deck: 2.5 to 4.5 in (64 to 114 mm); Barbettes: 14 in (356 mm); Conning tower: 14 inches

HMS Mars was a Royal Navy pre-dreadnought battleship of the Majestic class, the seventh member of a class of nine ships. The ship was laid down in the Laird Brothers shipyard in June 1894, she was launched in March 1896, and she was commissioned into the fleet in June 1897. She was armed with a main battery of four 12-inch (305 mm) guns and a secondary battery of twelve 6-inch (152 mm) guns. The ship had a top speed of 16 knots (30 km/h; 18 mph).

Mars served in the Channel Fleet after her commissioning and was present at the Coronation Fleet Review for Edward VII in 1902. She was reduced temporarily to the Reserve in March 1906 before returning to service with the Channel Fleet in October. The following March she was reassigned to the Home Fleet. As tensions in Europe rose dramatically in late July 1914, Mars was mobilized with her sister ships into the 9th Battle Squadron, based as a guard ship in the Humber. In December, she was transferred to the Dover Patrol, though in February 1915, she was decommissioned in Belfast and disarmed. Mars served as a troop ship during the Dardanelles Campaign before being converted into a depot ship. She remained in service until July 1920; the old ship was sold for scrap in May 1921 and broken up in November.

== Design ==
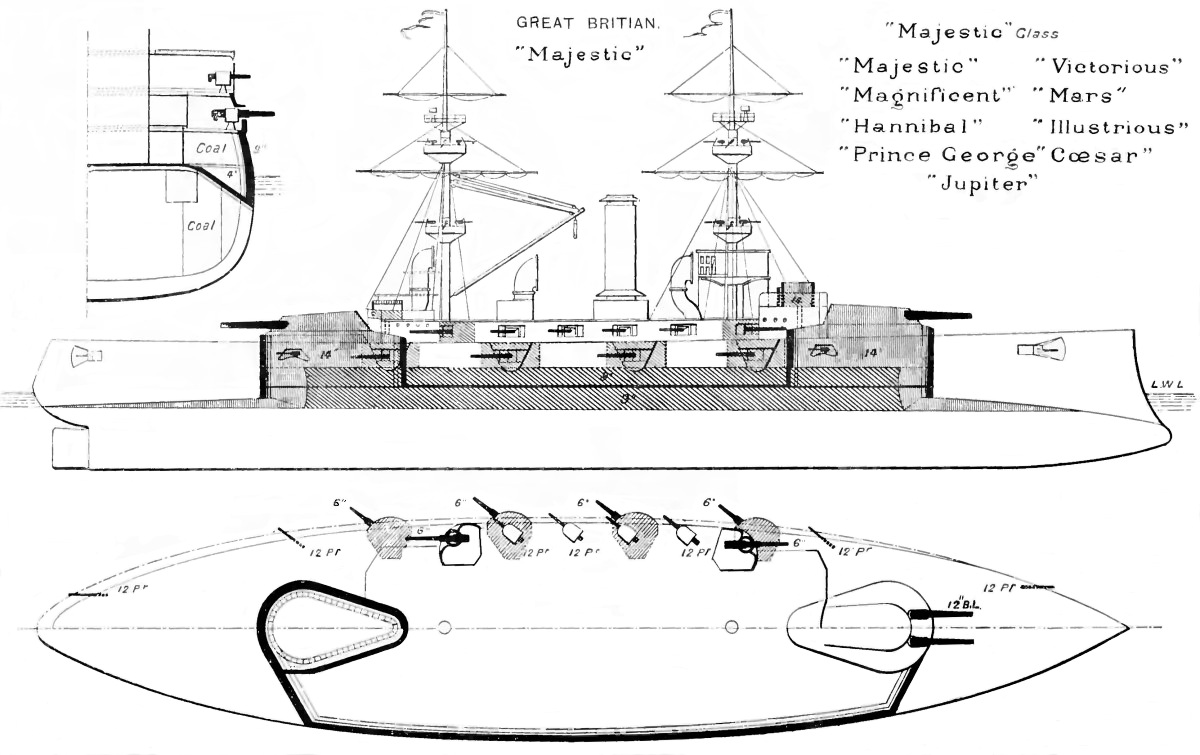
Right elevation, deck plan, and hull section as depicted in Brassey's Naval Annual 1902

Mars was 421 feet (128 m) long overall and had a beam of 75 ft (23 m) and a draft of 27 ft (8.2 m). She displaced up to 16,060 long tons (16,320 t) at full load. Her propulsion system consisted of two 3-cylinder triple-expansion steam engines powered by eight coal-fired, cylindrical fire-tube Scotch marine boilers. By 1907–1908, she was re-boilered with oil-fired models. Her engines provided a top speed of 16 knots (30 km/h; 18 mph) at 10,000 indicated horsepower (7,500 kW). The Majestics were considered good seaboats with an easy roll and good steamers, although they suffered from high fuel consumption. She had a crew of 672 officers and ratings.

The ship was armed with a main battery of four BL 12-inch (305 mm) Mk VIII guns in twin-gun turrets, one forward and one aft. The turrets were placed on pear-shaped barbettes; six of her sisters had the same arrangement, but her sisters Caesar and Illustrious and all future British battleship classes had circular barbettes. Mars also carried a secondary battery of twelve QF 6-inch (152 mm) /40 guns. They were mounted in casemates in two gun decks amidships. She also carried sixteen QF 12-pounder guns and twelve QF 2-pounder guns for defence against torpedo boats. She was also equipped with five 18 in (457 mm) torpedo tubes, four of which were submerged in the ship's hull, with the last in a deck-mounted launcher.

Mars and the other ships of her class had 9 inches (229 mm) of Harvey steel in their belt armour, which allowed equal protection with less cost in weight compared to previous types of armour. This allowed Mars and her sisters to have a deeper and lighter belt than previous battleships without any loss in protection. The barbettes for the main battery were protected with 14 in (356 mm) of armour, and the conning tower had the same thickness of steel on the sides. The ship's armoured deck was 2.5 to 4.5 in (64 to 114 mm) thick.

== Service history ==
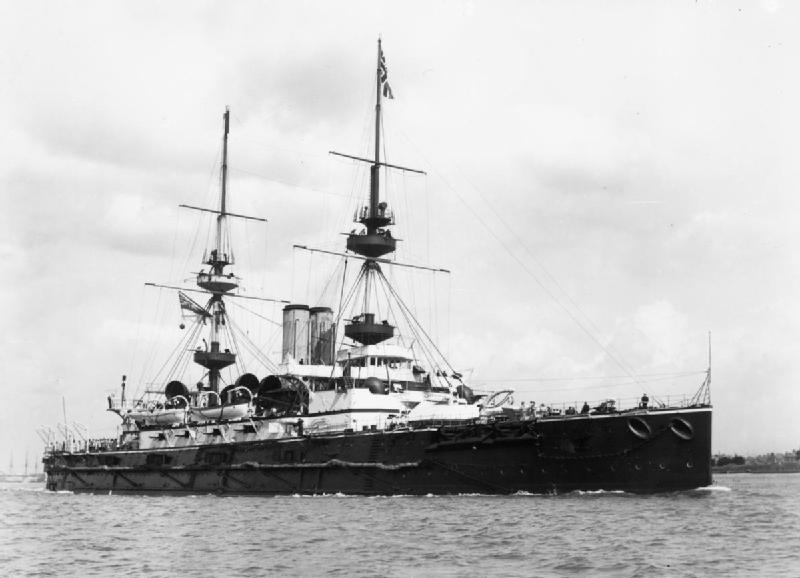
Mars underway c. 1898

HMS Mars was laid down at the Laird Brothers shipyard in Birkenhead on 2 June 1894. She was launched on 30 March 1896. She commissioned on 8 June 1897 for service with the Channel Fleet, where she served in the Portsmouth division. She was present at the Fleet Review at Spithead for the Diamond Jubilee of Queen Victoria on 26 June 1897. Captain Henry John May was appointed in command on 5 January 1899, and succeeded by Captain Henry Deacon Barry who was appointed in command in September 1900. She took part in the Coronation Fleet Review for King Edward VII on 16 August 1902, and the following two months she was part of a squadron visiting Nauplia and Souda Bay at Crete for combined manoeuvres between the Channel and Mediterranean fleets. On 16 August 1904, Mars began a refit at Portsmouth. During her refit, the Channel Fleet became the Atlantic Fleet in a reorganization on 1 January 1905, and she remained in the renamed unit. Her refit was completed in March 1905. Her Atlantic Fleet service ended on 31 March 1906, when she commissioned into the Reserve at Portsmouth.

Mars recommissioned at Portsmouth for service in the new Channel Fleet on 31 October 1906. This service ended when she paid off at Portsmouth on 4 March 1907. Mars recommissioned on 5 March 1907 for service in the Devonport Division of the new Home Fleet which had been organized in January 1907, and was based at Devonport. During this service, she underwent refits in 1908–1909 and 1911–1912. By July 1914, she was in the 4th Division, Home Fleet. With war appearing to be imminent, the Royal Navy undertook a precautionary mobilization on 27 July 1914. As part of this, Mars and her sister ships Hannibal, Magnificent, and Victorious formed the 9th Battle Squadron, which was based in the Humber under the Admiral of Patrols. Mars was serving as a guard ship at the Humber when the First World War began in August 1914, and continued in that duty after the 9th Battle Squadron was dissolved on 7 August 1914.

Mars was transferred to the Dover Patrol on 9 December 1914, and was based at Dover briefly before moving to Portland on 11 December 1914. She was based at Portland until February 1915. The Majestic-class ships were by then the oldest and least effective battleships in service in the Royal Navy. In February 1915, Mars transferred to Belfast, where she paid off on 15 February 1915. In March and April 1915 she was disarmed there by Harland and Wolff, retaining only four of her 6-inch (152-mm) guns and some lighter guns; her 12-inch (305-mm) guns were taken to arm the new Lord Clive-class monitors Earl of Peterborough and Sir Thomas Picton. After that, she was laid up in Loch Goil in April 1915.

In September 1915, Mars recommissioned to serve as a troopship in the Dardanelles campaign. Mars and her similarly disarmed sister ships Hannibal and Magnificent, also acting as troopships, arrived at Mudros on 5 October 1915. At the Dardanelles, Mars took part in the evacuation of Allied troops from Anzac Cove on 8 and 9 December 1915 and from West Beach at Cape Helles on 8 and 9 January 1916. During the West Beach evacuation, Mars was covered by what had once been her 12-inch (305-mm) guns, now mounted on Sir Thomas Picton. Mars returned to Devonport in February 1916, then paid off at Chatham, where she underwent a refit for conversion to a harbor depot ship. She recommissioned as a harbor depot ship on 1 September 1916, and served in this capacity at Invergordon until July 1920. Mars was placed on the sale list at Invergordon on 7 July 1920. She was sold for scrapping on 9 May 1921 and left Invergordon for scrapping at Briton Ferry in November 1921.
