= HMS Sir Thomas Picton =

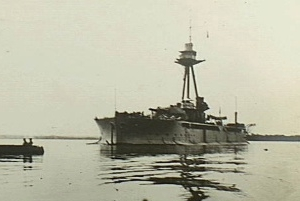
- Sir Thomas Picton c. 1916

History

United Kingdom
- Name: Sir Thomas Picton
- Namesake: Sir Thomas Picton
- Builder: Harland & Wolff, Belfast
- Yard number: 481
- Laid down: 16 January 1915
- Launched: 30 September 1915
- Completed: 4 November 1915
- Decommissioned: 1921
- Fate: Scrapped, 1921

General characteristics
- Class & type: Lord Clive-class monitor
- Displacement: 6,150 tons
- Length: 335 ft (102.1 m)
- Beam: 87 ft (26.5 m)
- Draught: 9.7 ft (3.0 m)
- Propulsion: 2 shafts, reciprocating steam engines, 2 boilers, 2,310 hp
- Speed: 6.5 knots (12.0 km/h; 7.5 mph)
- Complement: 187
- Armament: 2 × BL 12 in (305 mm) guns; 2 × 3 in (76 mm) guns

HMS Sir Thomas Picton was a First World War Royal Navy Lord Clive-class monitor. Sir Thomas Picton was the only Royal Navy ship ever named for Sir Thomas Picton, a British general of the Peninsular War who was killed at the Battle of Waterloo. The ship's original 12" main battery was stripped from the obsolete Majestic-class battleship HMS Mars.

The Lord Clive-class monitors were originally built in 1915 to engage German shore artillery in occupied Belgium during the First World War. Sir Thomas Picton, however was differently employed, being dispatched to the Eastern Mediterranean upon completion for service with the fleet there alongside her sister Earl of Peterborough. In early 1916, she shelled Turkish positions at the Dardanelles and during the remainder of the war was active against Turkish units in Egypt, Palestine and Turkey itself.

Following the armistice in November 1918, Sir Thomas Picton and her sisters were put into reserve pending scrapping, as the reason for their existence ended with the liberation of Central Power-held coastlines. In 1921, Sir Thomas Picton was scrapped along with all her sisters.
