= 9th Battle Squadron =

Former battleship formation of the Royal Navy

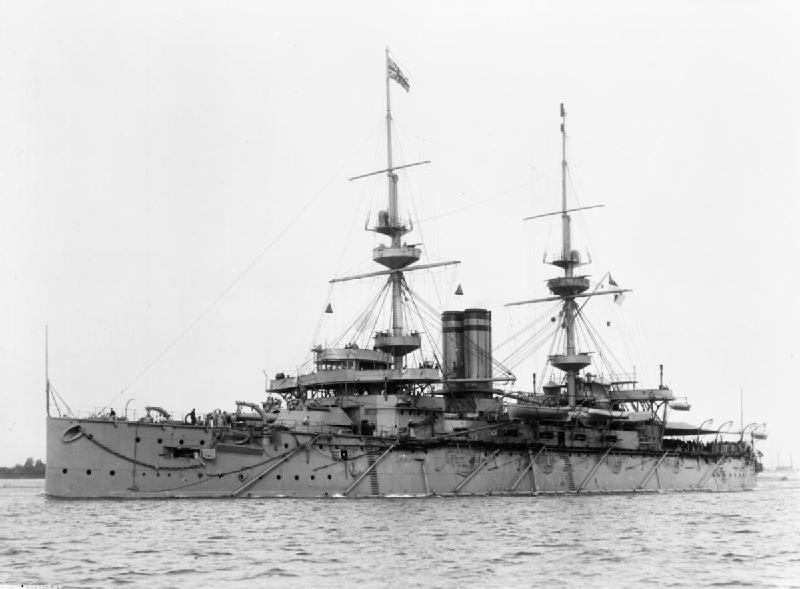
- HMS Hannibal
- Active: July 1914 – August 1914
- Country: United Kingdom
- Branch: Royal Navy
- Size: Squadron

The 9th Battle Squadron was a short-lived squadron of the British Royal Navy consisting of battleships serving in the Grand Fleet.

== History ==
The 9th Battle Squadron was formed at Grimsby on 27 July 1914, and comprised a number of the older Majestic-class pre-dreadnought battleships. These included:

- HMS Hannibal
- HMS Magnificent
- HMS Mars
- HMS Victorious

Due to the age and obsolescence of its constituent vessels, on 7 August 1914 the 9th Battle Squadron was dissolved and the ships were allocated to guard ship duty.
