= HMS Rupert =

Several ships of the Royal Navy have been named HMS Rupert or derivatives of the name, after Prince Rupert of the Rhine, son of Frederick V, Elector Palatine and a famous Royalist cavalry commander during the English Civil War.

- HMS Rupert (1666), launched in 1666 was a third-rate ship of the line which served in the navy for 103 years.
- HMS Rupert's Prize (1692) of 1692 was a sixth-rate ship captured by the above ship of the line during the Nine Years' War.
- HMS Rupert's Prize (1741) of 1741 was a sloop captured by the above ship of the line during the War of Jenkins' Ear.
- HMS Rupert (1872), launched in 1872 was a turret ram battleship prototype sold in 1907.
- HMS Prince Rupert of 1915 was a First World War Royal Navy Lord Clive-class monitor.
- HMS Rupert (1929) was a Rainbow-class submarine ordered in February 1929 but suspended in August, then cancelled.
- HMS Rupert (K561) of 1943 was a Captain-class frigate purchased from the United States during World War II.
