= HMS Hannibal (1896) =

Pre-dreadnought battleship of the British Royal Navy

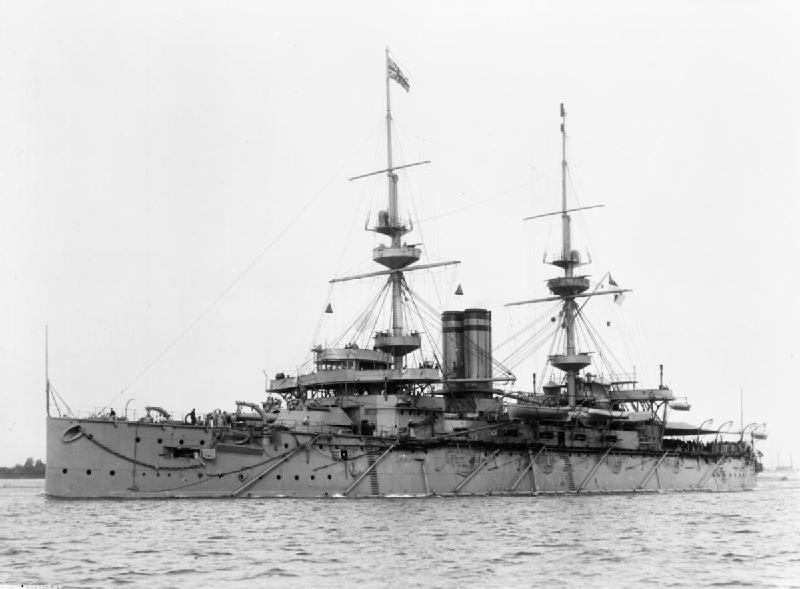
- HMS Hannibal

History

United Kingdom
- Namesake: Hannibal
- Builder: Pembroke Dock
- Laid down: 1 May 1895
- Launched: 28 April 1896
- Completed: April 1898
- Commissioned: April 1898
- Decommissioned: January 1920
- Fate: Sold for scrapping 28 January 1920

General characteristics
- Class & type: Majestic-class pre-dreadnought battleship
- Displacement: 16,060 long tons (16,320 t)
- Length: 421 ft (128 m)
- Beam: 75 ft (23 m)
- Draught: 27 ft (8.2 m)
- Installed power: 8 × Scotch marine boilers; 10,000 ihp (7,500 kW)
- Propulsion: 2 × triple-expansion steam engines; 2 × screw propellers
- Speed: 16 kn (30 km/h; 18 mph)
- Complement: 672
- Armament: 4 × BL 12 in (305 mm) guns; 12 × QF 6 in (152 mm) guns; 16 × 12 pounder (76 mm) guns; 12 × 3 pounder (47 mm) quick-firing guns; 5 × 18 in (457 mm) torpedo tubes
- Armour: Belt armour: 9 in (229 mm); Deck: 2.5 to 4.5 in (64 to 114 mm); Barbettes: 14 in (356 mm); Conning tower: 14 inches

HMS Hannibal was a Majestic-class pre-dreadnought battleship built for the Royal Navy, and the sixth ship to bear the name HMS Hannibal. The ship was laid down at the Pembroke Dock in May 1894, she was launched in April 1896, and commissioned into the fleet in April 1898. She was armed with a main battery of four 12-inch (305 mm) guns and a secondary battery of twelve 6-inch (152 mm) guns. The ship had a top speed of 16 knots (30 km/h; 18 mph).

Hannibal served with the Channel Fleet (later reorganised to the Atlantic Fleet) after commissioning in 1898. In 1906 she underwent a refit, which included a conversion from a coal burner to using oil. She was placed in reserve from 1907, only to be mobilised in July 1914 as a precautionary measure prior to the outbreak of the First World War. From August 1914 to February 1915 Hannibal was a guard ship at Scapa Flow. Later that year, her main armament was removed and she was converted to a troopship, serving in this capacity during the Dardanelles campaign. From November 1915 to the end of the war, she served as a depot ship based in Alexandria, Egypt. She was disposed of in 1920 and scrapped later that year.

== Design ==
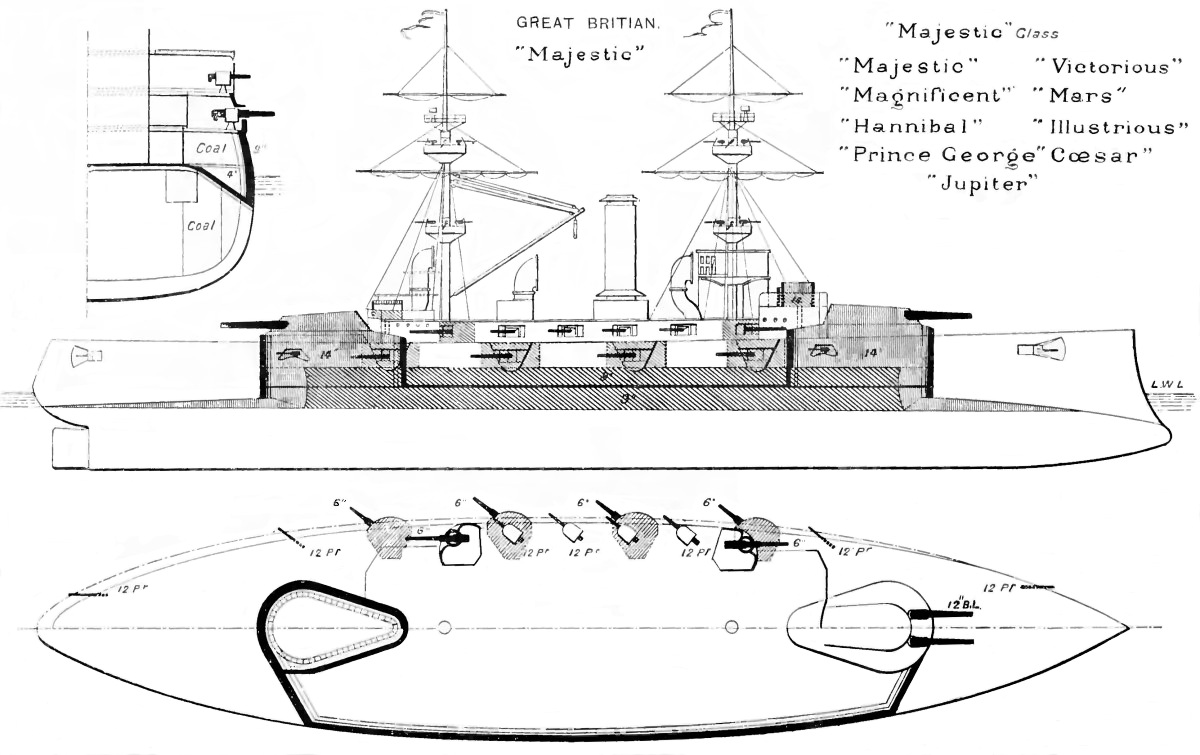
Right elevation, deck plan, and hull section as depicted in Brassey's Naval Annual 1902

Hannibal was 421 feet (128 m) long overall and had a beam of 75 ft (23 m) and a draft of 27 ft (8.2 m). She displaced up to 16,060 long tons (16,320 t) at full load. Her propulsion system consisted of two 3-cylinder triple-expansion steam engines powered by eight coal-fired, cylindrical fire-tube Scotch marine boilers. By 1907–08, she was re-boilered with oil-fired models. Her engines provided a top speed of 16 knots (30 km/h; 18 mph) at 10,000 indicated horsepower (7,500 kW). The Majestics were considered good seaboats with an easy roll and good steamers, although they suffered from high fuel consumption. She had a crew of 672 officers and ratings.

The ship was armed with a main battery of four BL 12-inch (305 mm) Mk VIII guns in twin-gun turrets, one forward and one aft. The turrets were placed on pear-shaped barbettes; six of her sisters had the same arrangement, but her sisters Caesar and Illustrious and all future British battleship classes had circular barbettes. Hannibal also carried a secondary battery of twelve QF 6-inch (152 mm) /40 guns. They were mounted in casemates in two gun decks amidships. She also carried sixteen QF 12-pounder guns and twelve QF 2-pounder guns for defence against torpedo boats. She was also equipped with five 18 in (457 mm) torpedo tubes, four of which were submerged in the ship's hull, with the last in a deck-mounted launcher.

Hannibal and the other ships of her class had 9 inches (229 mm) of Harvey steel in their belt armour, which allowed equal protection with less cost in weight compared to previous types of armour. This allowed Hannibal and her sisters to have a deeper and lighter belt than previous battleships without any loss in protection. The barbettes for the main battery were protected with 14 in (356 mm) of armour, and the conning tower had the same thickness of steel on the sides. The ship's armoured deck was 2.5 to 4.5 in (64 to 114 mm) thick.

== Service history ==
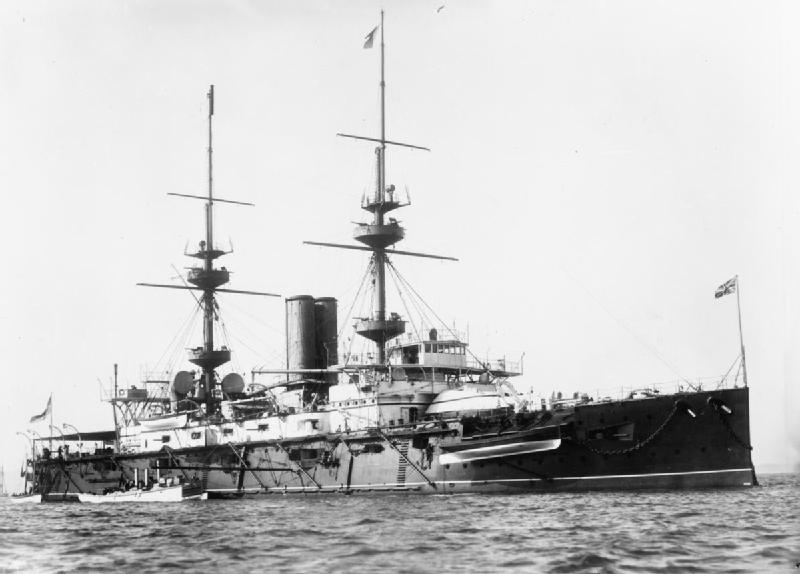
Hannibal in 1898

The keel for HMS Hannibal was laid down at the Pembroke Dock on 1 May 1894. Her completed hull was launched on 28 April 1896. She went into the commissioned reserve upon completion in April 1898. On 10 May 1898 she went into full commission to serve in the Portsmouth division of the Channel Fleet, under the command of Captain Sir Baldwin Wake Walker. She was part of a huge fleet of ships present in the Solent for the passage of the body of Queen Victoria from Cowes to Portsmouth on 2 February 1901. Captain George Augustus Giffard was appointed in command on 10 May 1902, and she was present at the Coronation Fleet Review for King Edward VII on 16 August 1902.

Earlier the same month, two officers and a seaman of the Hannibal drowned while on a fishing excursion outside Berehaven. In September 1902 she was part of a squadron visiting Nauplia and Souda Bay at Crete in the Mediterranean Sea. On 17 October 1903 she collided with and badly damaged her sister ship HMS Prince George off Ferrol, Spain. When a fleet reorganisation led to the Channel Fleet being redesignated the Atlantic Fleet on 1 January 1905, Hannibal became an Atlantic Fleet unit. Hannibal transferred to the new Channel Fleet (formerly the Home Fleet) on 28 February 1905. This service ended on 3 August 1905, when she paid off into reserve at Devonport.

Hannibal underwent a refit in 1906 in which she was converted to burn oil fuel and received fire control for her main battery. She then recommissioned in reserve on 20 October 1906. In January 1907, Hannibal went into full commission as a temporary replacement for battleship HMS Ocean in the Channel Fleet while Ocean was under refit. When Ocean returned to service, Hannibal remained in Channel Fleet service as a temporary replacement for battleship HMS Dominion while Dominion was undergoing refit. When Dominion returned to service in May 1907, Hannibal went back into the commissioned reserve, becoming a part of the Portsmouth Division of the new Home Fleet in July 1907. While in commissioned reserve at Portsmouth, Hannibal suffered two significant mishaps. On 19 August 1909 she struck a reef in Babbacombe Bay, damaging her bottom. On 29 October 1909 she collided with torpedo boat HMS TB 105, suffering no damage herself but badly damaging the torpedo boat. She underwent a refit at Devonport from November 1911 to March 1912.

=== First World War ===
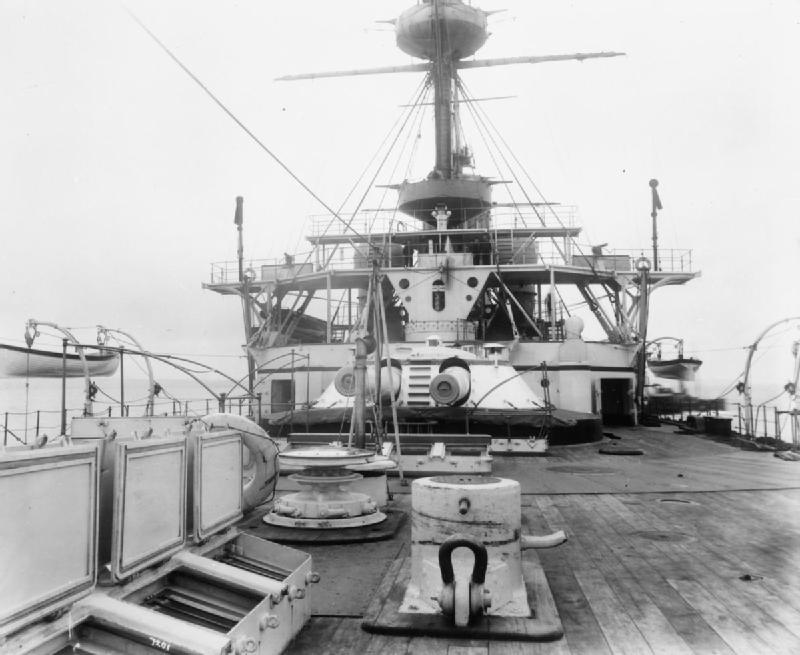
View of 'Y' turret (12 inch Mk VIII guns) and after superstructure from the quarterdeck

The Royal Navy began a precautionary mobilisation in July 1914 when war appeared increasingly likely. As part of this, Hannibal and her sister ships HMS Mars, HMS Magnificent, and HMS Victorious formed the 9th Battle Squadron on 27 July 1914, stationed at the Humber to defend the British coast. Hannibal was serving as a guard ship on the Humber when the First World War began in August 1914. The 9th Battle Squadron was dissolved on 7 August 1914, and Hannibal was transferred to Scapa Flow, where she served as a guard ship until relieved by the first-class protected cruiser HMS Royal Arthur on 20 February 1915. Hannibal then paid off at Dalmuir.

The Majestic-class ships were by then the oldest and least effective battleships in service in the Royal Navy. While inactive at Dalmuir, Hannibal was disarmed between March and April 1915 except for four 6-inch (152 mm) guns and some lighter guns. Her 12-inch (305 mm) guns were taken for use aboard the new Lord Clive-class monitors HMS Prince Eugene and HMS Sir John Moore. After she was disarmed, she was laid up at Scapa Flow and Loch Goil until September 1915. Hannibal recommissioned at Greenock on 9 September 1915 to serve as a troopship in the Dardanelles campaign. She arrived at Mudros in this capacity on 7 October 1915. In November 1915, Hannibal became a depot ship for auxiliary patrol craft at Alexandria, Egypt, supporting both forces operating from Egypt and those in the Red Sea until June 1919, leaving Egypt for Malta on 9 September. Hannibal was paid off for disposal at Malta on 25 October 1919, was sold for scrapping on 28 January 1920, and was broken up in Italy.
