= HMS Sir John Moore =

History

United Kingdom
- Name: Sir John Moore
- Namesake: John Moore
- Builder: Scotts, Greenock
- Yard number: 469
- Laid down: 13 January 1915
- Launched: 31 May 1915
- Commissioned: 22 July 1915
- Decommissioned: 1921
- Fate: Sold for scrap, 8 November 1921

General characteristics (as built)
- Class & type: Lord Clive-class monitor
- Displacement: 5,850 long tons (5,940 t) (deep load)
- Length: 335 ft 6 in (102.3 m)
- Beam: 87 ft 2 in (26.6 m)
- Draught: 9 ft 10 in (3 m) (deep load)
- Installed power: 2 water-tube boilers; 2,500 ihp (1,900 kW)
- Propulsion: 2 shafts, 2 triple-expansion steam engines
- Speed: 7.8 knots (14.4 km/h; 9.0 mph) (trials)
- Complement: 12 officers, 182 ratings
- Armament: 1 × twin 12 in (305 mm) guns; 1 × single 3 pdr (47 mm (1.9 in)) AA gun; 1 × single 2 pdr (40 mm (1.6 in)) AA gun
- Armour: Waterline belt: 6 in (152 mm); Deck: 1–2 in (25–51 mm); Barbette: 8 in (203 mm); Gun turret: 5.5–10.5 in (140–267 mm); Conning tower: 6 in (152 mm)

HMS Sir John Moore was one of eight Lord Clive-class monitors built for the Royal Navy in 1915 to conduct shore bombardments during the First World War. The ship was assigned to the Dover Patrol for the duration of the war and was sold for scrap in 1921.

== Design and description ==
The Lord Clive design was derived from that of the preceding Abercrombie class, modified to suit the smaller and lighter main battery. The ships had an overall length of 335 feet 6 inches (102.3 m), a maximum beam of 87 feet 2 inches (26.6 m), and a deep draught of 9 feet 10 inches (3 m). She displaced 5,850 long tons (5,940 t) at deep load. To improve stability, 15-foot (4.6 m) torpedo bulges were incorporated into the hull. Her crew numbered 12 officers and 182 ratings.

Sir John Moore was powered by a pair of three-cylinder triple-expansion steam engines each driving one propeller shaft using steam provided by two coal-burning watertube boilers. The engines developed a total of 2,500 indicated horsepower (1,900 kW) and were designed for a maximum speed of 10 knots (19 km/h; 12 mph), although the ships proved to be significantly slower, with Sir John Moore reaching a speed of 7.8 knots (14.4 km/h; 9.0 mph) during her sea trials. The Lord Clives had a range of 1,100 nautical miles (2,000 km; 1,300 mi) at a cruising speed of 6.5 knots (12.0 km/h; 7.5 mph).

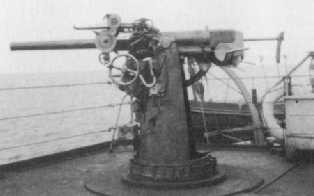
QF 3-pounder on Sir John Moore, c. 1918

Si were armed with a pair of BL 12-inch (305 mm) Mk VIII guns in a single twin-gun turret; Sir John Moore's turret was taken from the elderly predreadnought battleship HMS Hannibal. Their anti-aircraft armament consisted of a Vickers 3-pounder (47 mm (1.9 in)) and a 2-pounder (40 mm (1.6 in)) guns on high-angle mounts.

== Construction and career ==
Sir John Moore, named for General Sir John Moore, was laid down on 13 January 1915 at Scotts Shipbuilding and Engineering Company's shipyard in Greenock. The ship was launched on 31 May and commissioned on 22 July.

Following the armistice in November 1918, Sir John Moore briefly served as a tender for the gunnery school. She was placed in reserve in early 1920 and listed for sale. Sir John Moore was sold for scrap on 8 November 1921 and towed to Bremen, Germany, on 23 December 1922 for demolition.
