= HMS Earl of Peterborough =

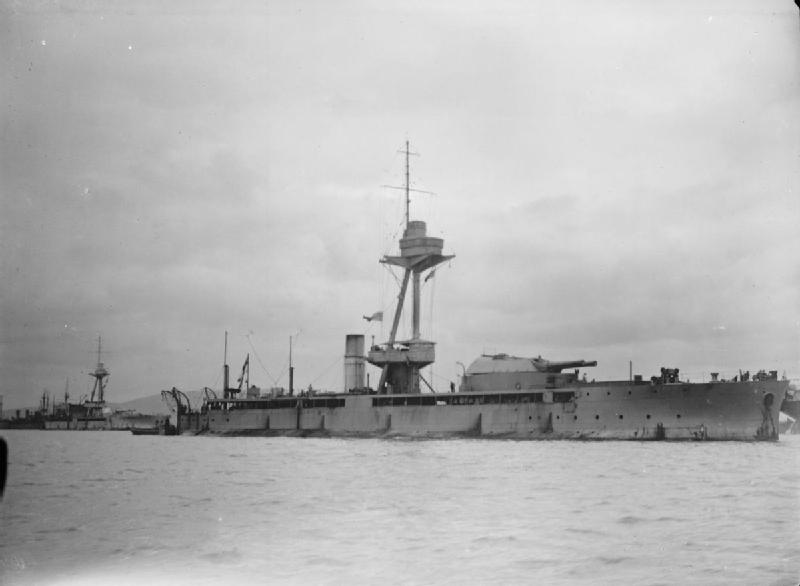
- Earl of Peterborough at Mudros. HMS Roberts astern

History

United Kingdom
- Name: HMS Earl of Peterborough
- Builder: Harland & Wolff, Belfast
- Yard number: 480
- Laid down: 16 January 1915
- Launched: 26 August 1915
- Completed: 23 September 1915
- Decommissioned: 1921
- Fate: Scrapped, 1921

General characteristics
- Class & type: Lord Clive-class monitor
- Displacement: 6,150 tons
- Length: 335 ft (102.1 m)
- Beam: 87 ft (26.5 m)
- Draught: 9.7 ft (3.0 m)
- Propulsion: 2 shafts, reciprocating steam engines, 2 boilers, 2,310 hp
- Speed: 6.5 knots (12.0 km/h; 7.5 mph)
- Complement: 187
- Armament: 1 × twin BL 12-inch (305 mm) guns; 2 × single 3-inch (76 mm) guns

HMS Earl of Peterborough was a First World War Royal Navy Lord Clive-class monitor, named after Charles Mordaunt, 3rd Earl of Peterborough, a British general of the War of the Spanish Succession who fought in Spain. The ship's original 12-inch main battery was stripped from an obsolete Majestic-class battleship, HMS Mars.

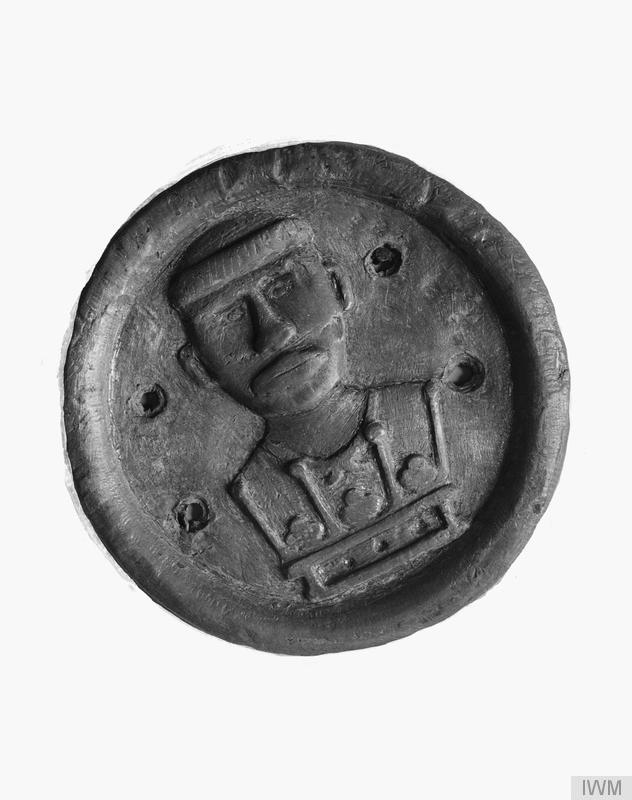
Earl of Peterborough Ship's badge

The Lord Clive-class monitors were originally built in 1915 to engage German shore artillery in occupied Belgium during the First World War. Earl of Peterborough, however was differently employed, being dispatched to the Eastern Mediterranean upon completion for service with the fleet there. Early in 1916 she shelled Turkish positions in the Dardanelles and during the remainder of the war was active against Turkish units in Egypt, Palestine and Turkey itself.

Following the armistice in November 1918, Earl of Peterborough and her sisters were put into reserve pending scrapping, as the reason for their existence ended with the liberation of Central Power-led coastlines. In 1921 Earl of Peterborough was scrapped along with all her sisters.
