= HMS Prince Eugene =

British naval ship

History

United Kingdom
- Name: Prince Eugene
- Builder: Harland & Wolff, Govan
- Yard number: 477
- Laid down: 1 February 1915
- Launched: 14 July 1915
- Completed: 2 September 1915
- Commissioned: 21 August 1915
- Decommissioned: 1919
- Fate: Sold for scrap, 9 May 1921

General characteristics (as built)
- Class & type: Lord Clive-class monitor
- Displacement: 5,850 long tons (5,940 t) (deep load)
- Length: 335 ft 6 in (102.3 m)
- Beam: 87 ft 2 in (26.6 m)
- Draught: 9 ft 10 in (3 m) (deep load)
- Installed power: 2 water-tube boilers; 2,500 ihp (1,900 kW)
- Propulsion: 2 shafts, 2 triple-expansion steam engines
- Speed: About 7.5 knots (13.9 km/h; 8.6 mph)
- Complement: 12 officers, 182 ratings
- Armament: 1 × twin 12 in (305 mm) guns; 1 × single 3 in (76 mm) AA gun; 1 × single 2 pdr (40 mm (1.6 in)) AA gun
- Armour: Waterline belt: 6 in (152 mm); Deck: 1–2 in (25–51 mm); Barbette: 8 in (203 mm); Gun turret: 5.5–10.5 in (140–267 mm); Conning tower: 6 in (152 mm)

HMS Prince Eugene was one of eight Lord Clive-class monitors built for the Royal Navy in 1915 to conduct shore bombardments during the First World War. The ship was assigned to the Dover Patrol for the duration of the war and provided cover for the Inshore Squadron during the First Ostend Raid. She was sold for scrap in 1921.

== Design and description ==
The Lord Clive design was derived from that of the preceding Abercrombie class, modified to suit the smaller and lighter main battery. The ships had an overall length of 335 feet 6 inches (102.3 m), a maximum beam of 87 feet 2 inches (26.6 m), and a deep draught of 9 feet 10 inches (3 m). She displaced 5,850 long tons (5,940 t) at deep load. To improve stability, 15-foot (4.6 m) torpedo bulges were incorporated into the hull. Her crew numbered 12 officers and 182 ratings.

Prince Eugene was powered by a pair of four-cylinder triple-expansion steam engines each driving one propeller shaft using steam provided by two coal-burning water-tube boilers. The engines developed a total of 2,500 indicated horsepower (1,900 kW) and were designed for a maximum speed of 10 knots (19 km/h; 12 mph), although the ships proved to be significantly slower, with Prince Eugene reaching an adjusted speed of 7.6 knots (14.1 km/h; 8.7 mph) during her sea trials. The Lord Clives had a range of 1,100 nautical miles (2,000 km; 1,300 mi) at a cruising speed of 6.5 knots (12.0 km/h; 7.5 mph).

The ships were armed with a pair of BL 12-inch (305 mm) Mk VIII guns in a single twin-gun turret; Prince Eugene's turret was taken from the elderly predreadnought battleship HMS Hannibal. The ship's anti-aircraft armament consisted of a (3 in (76 mm)) and a 2-pounder (40 mm (1.6 in)) guns on high-angle mounts.

== Construction and career ==
Prince Eugene was named after Prince Eugene of Savoy and has been the only ship of the Royal Navy to be named after the general. The ship was laid down on 1 February 1915 at Harland & Wolff's Govan shipyard, launched on 14 July and commissioned on 2 September.

During a refit from December 1917 to March 1918, Prince Eugene was modified to accept a single 18-inch (457 mm) gun in a limited-traverse mount aft of her funnel. Delivery of the mounts was slow and the ship had not received hers by the war's end in November 1918. Prince Eugene was decommissioned in early 1919 and was sold for scrap on 9 May 1921. She arrived at Thos. W. Ward's Preston, Lancashire, scrapyard on 10 August 1923 to begin demolition.
