= HMS Prince Rupert =

Royal Navy warship

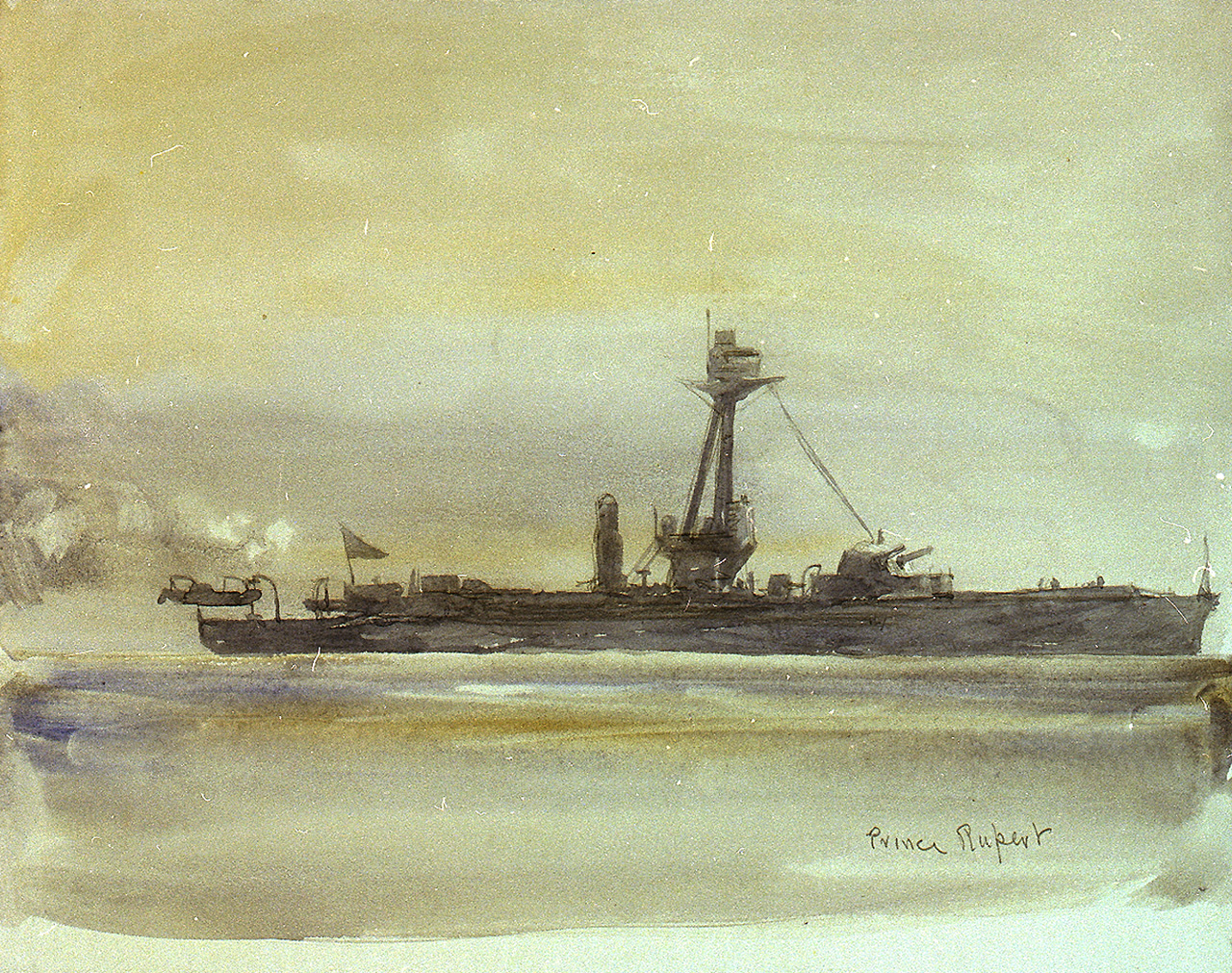
- A painting of Prince Rupert

History

United Kingdom
- Name: Prince Rupert
- Builder: William Hamilton & Co, Port Glasgow
- Laid down: 12 January 1915
- Launched: 20 May 1915
- Decommissioned: 1923
- Fate: Scrapped, 1923

General characteristics
- Class & type: Lord Clive-class monitor
- Displacement: 6,150 tons
- Length: 335 ft (102.1 m)
- Beam: 87 ft (26.5 m)
- Draught: 9.7 ft (3.0 m)
- Propulsion: 2 shafts, reciprocating steam engines, 2 boilers, 2,310 hp
- Speed: 6.5 knots (12.0 km/h; 7.5 mph)
- Complement: 187
- Armament: 2 × 12 in (305 mm) guns; 2 × 3 in (76 mm) guns

HMS Prince Rupert was a First World War Royal Navy Lord Clive-class monitor named after Prince Rupert of the Rhine, an important Royalist commander of the English Civil War and key figure in the Restoration navy. Although she is the only ship of the Royal Navy to have ever had this precise name, other ships have been named after Prince Rupert as HMS Rupert. Her 12" main battery was stripped from the obsolete Majestic-class battleships.

The Lord Clive-class monitors were built in 1915 to engage German shore artillery in occupied Belgium during the First World War. Prince Rupert, with her sisters was regularly engaged in this service in the Dover Monitor Squadron, bombarding German positions along the coast and someway inland with their heavy guns.

Following the armistice in November 1918, Prince Rupert and all her sisters were put into reserve pending scrapping, as the reason for their existence had ended with the liberation of Belgium. In 1923 Prince Rupert was scrapped, outliving all her sister ships by two years as she had been briefly attached to the stone frigate HMS Pembroke at Chatham Dockyard.

== Bibliography ==
- Buxton, Ian (2008) [1978]. Big Gun Monitors. Seaforth Publishing. ISBN 978-1-84415-719-8.
- Colledge, J. J.; Wardlow, Ben & Bush, Steve (2020). Ships of the Royal Navy: The Complete Record of All Fighting Ships of the Royal Navy from the 15th Century to the Present (5th ed.). Barnsley, UK: Seaforth Publishing. ISBN 978-1-5267-9327-0.
- Dittmar, F. J.; Colledge, J. J. (1972). British Warships 1914–1919. London, UK: Ian Allan. ISBN 978-0-7110-0380-4.
- Preston, Antony (1985). "Great Britain and Empire Forces". In Gray, Randal (ed.). Conway's All the World's Fighting Ships 1906–1921. Annapolis, Maryland: Naval Institute Press. pp. 1–104. ISBN 0-85177-245-5.
