= Lord Clive-class monitor =

1915 class of British monitors

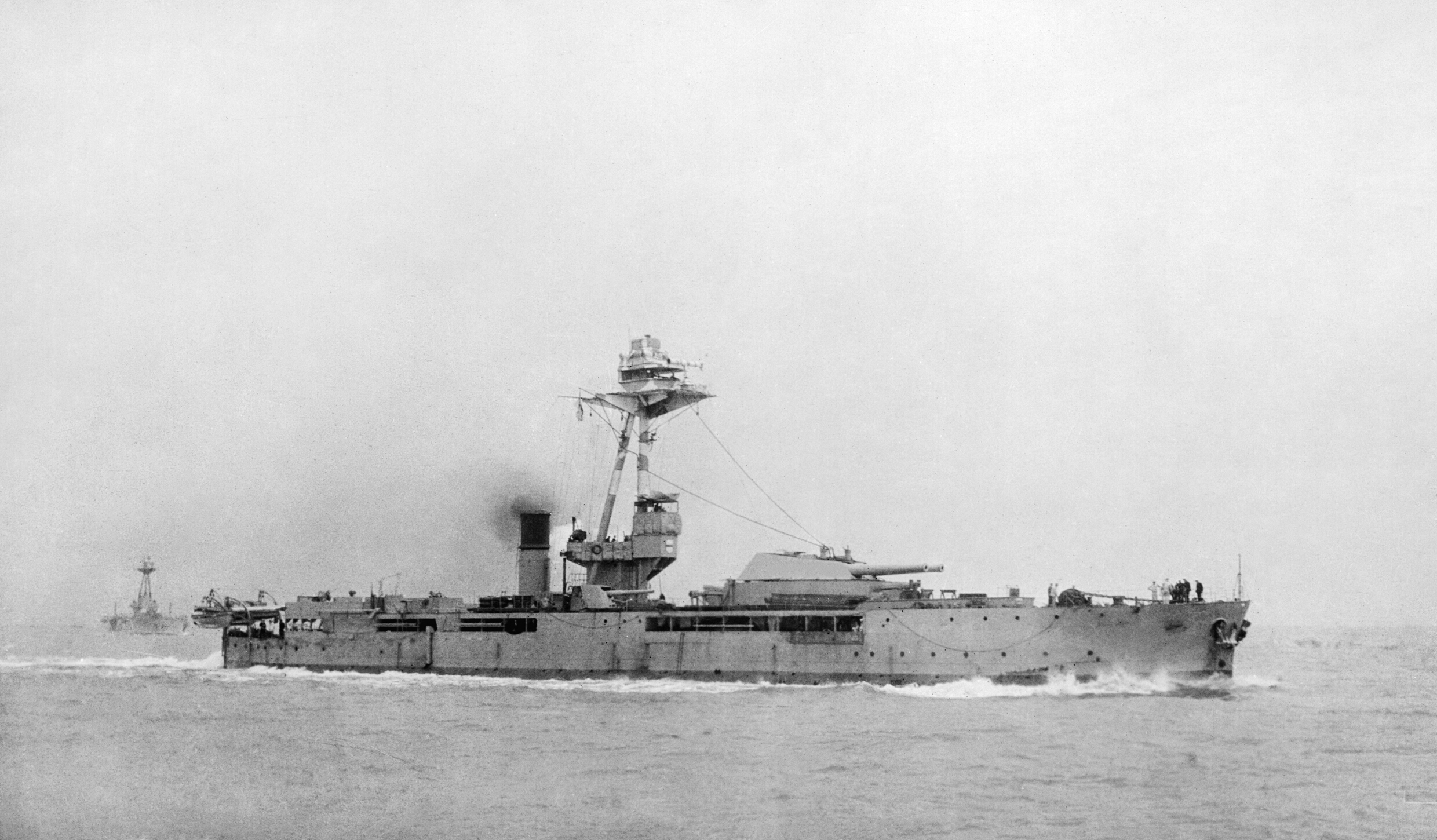
- General Craufurd

Class overview
- Name: Lord Clive class
- Builders: Harland & Wolff (5); Palmers Shipbuilding & Iron (1); Scotts Shipbuilding & Eng. (1); William Hamilton (1)
- Operators: Royal Navy
- Preceded by: Abercrombie class
- Succeeded by: Marshal Ney class
- Built: 1915
- In commission: June 1915 – 1927
- Completed: 8
- Scrapped: 8

General characteristics
- Type: Monitor
- Displacement: 6,150 tons
- Length: 335 ft (102 m)
- Beam: 87 ft (27 m)
- Draught: 9 ft 7 in (2.92 m)
- Propulsion: 2 shafts, reciprocating steam engines, 2 boilers, 2,310 hp
- Speed: 6.5 knots (12.0 km/h)
- Complement: 194
- Armament: Originally two BL 12 inch Mk VIII in a single turret, two QF 3-pounder guns. Lord Clive and General Wolfe had an additional single BL 18 inch Mk I in 1918 installed aft. Similar work on Prince Eugene was not completed because of the end of the war.
- Armour: Belt: 6 inch; Turret: 10.5 inch; Barbette 8 inch; Deck 2 inch

The Lord Clive-class monitor, sometimes referred to as the General Wolfe class, were ships designed for shore bombardment and were constructed for the Royal Navy during the First World War.

== Design ==
The slow progress of the war led to the need for more shore bombardment ships and various schemes for using spare heavy guns were considered. Heavier guns such as 13.5-inch and 15-inch weapons had no available mountings so the main armament consisted of a single twin 12-inch (305 mm) gun turret taken from decommissioned Majestic-class pre-dreadnought battleships.

The ships were ordered after the Abercrombie class had begun building and the hull form was a near repeat of that design. The rapid design to fit the 12-inch turrets was carried out by Charles Lillicrap as second in his series of monitor classes. Extra quick-firing artillery for protection from destroyers and torpedo boats was also fitted in most ships and consisted of up to four six-inch guns.

== Ships ==
Construction data
Ship	Namesake	Builder	Launched	Service / Fate
Lord Clive	Clive of India	Harland & Wolff, Belfast	June 1915	Served in the Dover monitor squadron and as a gunnery trials ship after the war. Broken up in 1927.
General Craufurd	Robert Craufurd	Harland and Wolff, Belfast	July 1915	Served with the Dover Monitor squadron. Broken up in 1921.
Earl of Peterborough	Charles Mordaunt, 3rd Earl of Peterborough	Harland and Wolff, Belfast	August 1915	Served in the Mediterranean during World War I. Broken up in 1921.
Sir Thomas Picton	Thomas Picton	Harland and Wolff, Belfast	1915	Served in the Mediterranean. Broken up in 1921.
Prince Eugene	Prince Eugene of Savoy	Harland and Wolff, Govan	September 1915	Served in the Dover Monitor Squadron. Broken up in 1921.
Prince Rupert	Prince Rupert of the Rhine	William Hamilton & Co, Port Glasgow	May 1915	Served in the Dover Monitor Squadron. Broken up in 1923.
Sir John Moore	Sir John Moore	Scotts, Greenock	May 1915	Served in the Dover Monitor squadron. Broken up in 1921.
General Wolfe	James Wolfe	Palmers, Newcastle	September 1915	Served in the Dover Monitor squadron. Broken up in 1921.

== 18-inch conversions ==
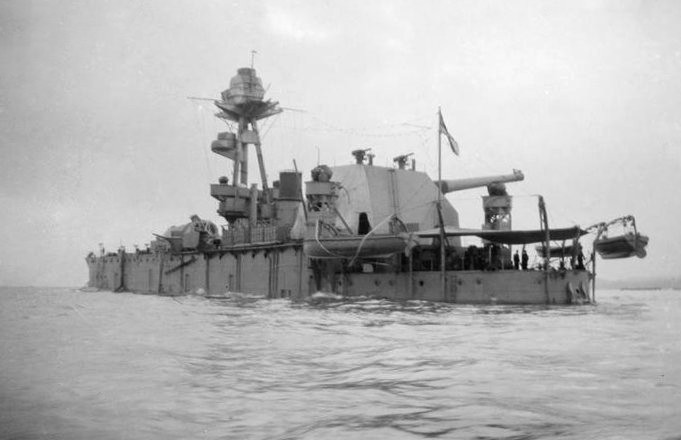
The stern of HMS Lord Clive; showing her BL 18 inch gun on its fixed mounting, November 1918

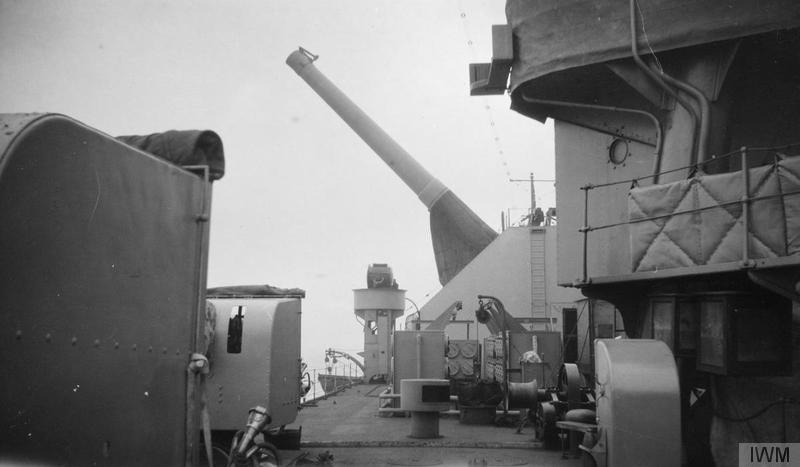
On board Lord Clive; her BL 18 inch gun is at its full elevation. November 1918

Three of the ships, HMS General Wolfe, Lord Clive and Prince Eugene, were to be converted to take the BL 18-inch guns that had originally been allocated to HMS Furious. The guns were mounted aft, permanently arranged to fire over the starboard beam. The mounting consisted of two massive side girders parallel to the barrel, between which the gun was slung. At the forward end was a support about which the gun could train in a limited arc, with a hydraulic cylinder providing ten degrees of traverse each side of the mounting center line. The gun was loaded at the fixed angle of 10 degrees, but firing was only allowed between 22 degrees and 45 degrees of elevation, to distribute the large firing forces evenly between the forward and after supports. The mounting was covered by a large non-traversing half-inch steel plate shield fixed to the deck.

The enormous rounds and charges were transported to the gunhouse on a light railway fixed to the main deck. Work was completed on Lord Clive and General Wolfe but the end of World War I intervened before Prince Eugene was finished. Both of the converted ships saw action. The original 12-inch turret was left in place on them to maintain stability.

General Wolfe fired on a railway bridge at Snaeskerke, four miles (6 km) south of Ostend, Belgium, on 28 September 1918. The range of 36,000 yards (33 km) made this the greatest range at which a Royal Navy vessel has ever engaged an enemy target using guns. Lord Clive fired a mere four rounds with the replacement gun at enemy targets.

The guns used were as follows:

- The gun from the rear turret of Furious was to have been fitted to Prince Eugene;
- The gun intended for the forward turret of Furious was fitted to General Wolfe;
- The gun fitted to Lord Clive was a spare.

== Bibliography ==
- Bacon, Reginald (1919). The Dover Patrol 1915–1917. (2 vols.). New York: George H. Doran Co. Vol. 1 • Vol. 2
- Buxton, Ian (2008) [1978]. Big Gun Monitors: Design, Construction and Operations 1914–1945 (2nd Revised ed.). Barnsley, UK: Seaforth Publishing. ISBN 978-1-84415-719-8.
- Colledge, J. J.; Warlow, Ben (2006) [1969]. Ships of the Royal Navy: The Complete Record of All Fighting Ships of the Royal Navy from the 15th Century to the Present (3rd Rev ed.). London: Chatham Publishing. ISBN 978-1-86176-281-8. OCLC 67375475.
- Crossley, Jim (2013). Monitors of the Royal Navy; How the Fleet Brought the Great Guns to Bear. Barnsley, UK: Pen & Sword. ISBN 978-1-78383-004-6.
- Dittmar, F. J. & Colledge, J. J., "British Warships 1914–1919", (Ian Allan, London, 1972), ISBN 0-7110-0380-7
- Dunn, Steve R. (2017). Securing the Narrow Sea: The Dover Patrol 1914–1918. Barnsley, UK: Seaforth Publishing. ISBN 978-1-84832-251-6.
- Friedman, Norman (2011). Naval Weapons of World War One: Guns, Torpedoes, Mines and ASW Weapons of All Nations; An Illustrated Directory. Barnsley: Seaforth Publishing. ISBN 978-1-84832-100-7.
- Parkes, Oscar; Prendergast, Maurice, eds. (1969) [1919]. Jane's Fighting Ships 1919. New York: Arco Publishing Co. ISBN 978-0-71534-716-4. OCLC 1902851.
- Preston, Antony (1985). "Great Britain and Empire Forces". In Gray, Randal (ed.). Conway's All the World's Fighting Ships 1906–1921. Annapolis, Maryland: Naval Institute Press. pp. 1–104. ISBN 0-85177-245-5.
