= BL 12-inch Mk VIII naval gun =

Ordnance BL 12-inch Mk VIII gun
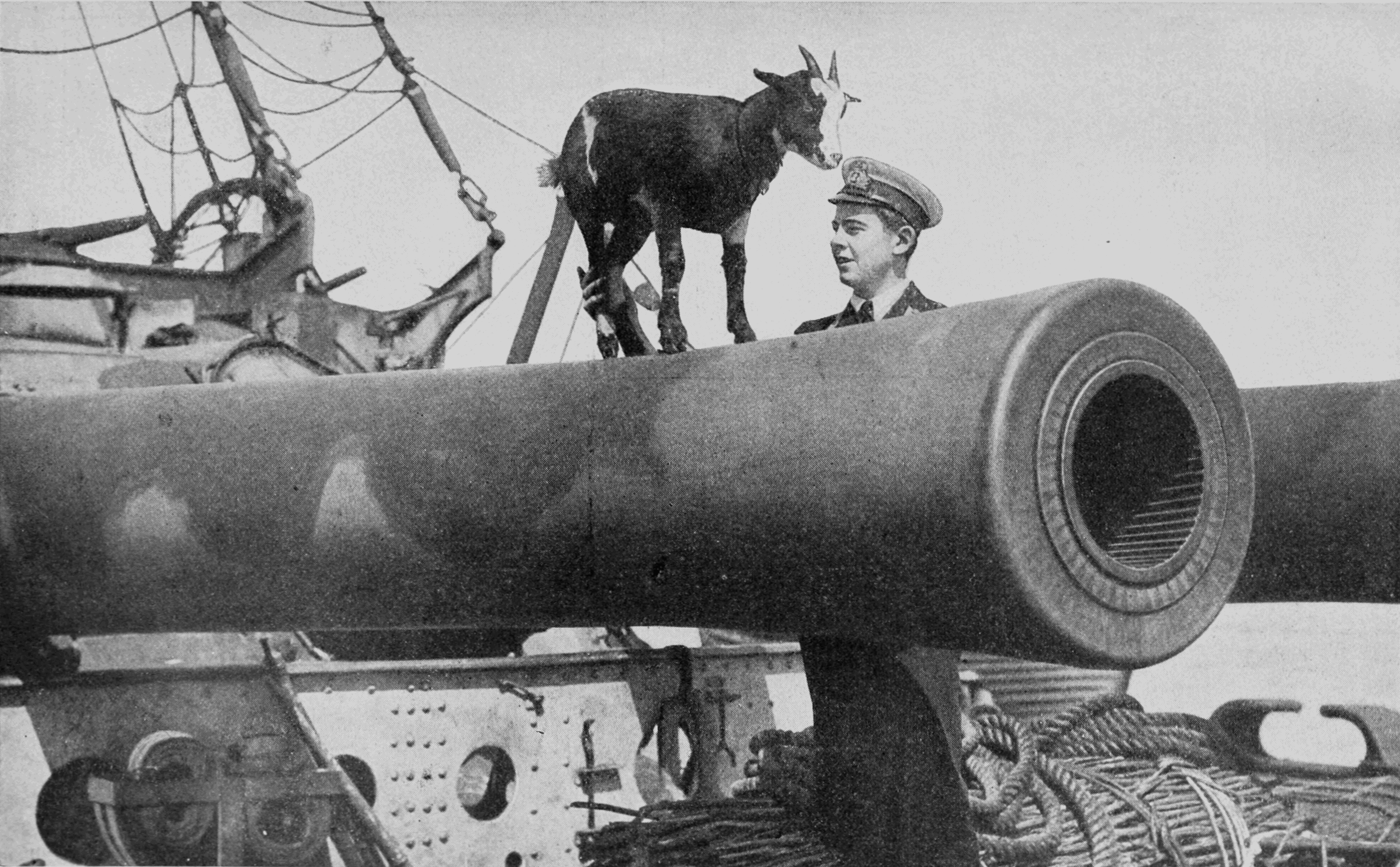
- Muzzle of gun on HMS Canopus, 1916
- Type: Naval Gun, Coastal Defence
- Place of origin: United Kingdom

Service history
- In service: 1895–1927
- Used by: Royal Navy
- Wars: World War I

Production history
- Designer: Woolwich Arsenal
- Manufacturer: Vickers
- Variants: Mk VIII, VIIIe, VIIIv

Specifications
- Mass: 46 tons barrel & breech
- Length: 445.6 in (11.32 m)
- Barrel length: 35 ft 5 in (10.80 m) (35.43 calibres)
- Shell: 850 lb (390 kg)
- Calibre: 12-inch (304.8 mm)
- Breech: Welin interrupted screw
- Recoil: hydraulic
- Elevation: 3 / +13.5 degrees
- Traverse: +150 / -150 degrees
- Rate of fire: Battleships: 1 in 70 sec. Monitors: 1 in 60 sec.
- Muzzle velocity: 2,367 ft/s (721 m/s)
- Effective firing range: 10,000 yd (9,100 m)
- Maximum firing range: 26,000 yd (24,000 m)

The BL 12-inch Mark VIII naval gun (Note: Mark VIII = Mark 8. Britain used Roman numerals to denote marks (models, abbreviated Mk) of ordnance until after World War II. Hence this was the 8th model of British 12-inch breech-loading naval guns,) was one of the first large British rifled breech-loading naval guns designed for the higher pressures generated by the new cordite propellant of the 1890s, and Britain's first large wire-wound gun. It represented a major advance compared to previous British guns.

== Naval service ==
The gun was installed on the Majestic-class battleships from 1895 and on the Canopus-class battleships from 1899. During World War I guns removed from the obsolete Majestic class were mounted in Lord Clive-class monitors for shore bombardment.

== Land service ==
From 1921 to 1926 two guns from the decommissioned battleship HMS Illustrious were in service in the Tyne Turrets for coast defence, north and south of the mouth of the River Tyne in the northeast of England.

== Problems in service ==
During bombardment service when mounted in the Lord Clive-class monitors deposition of copper from the projectile driving bands needed frequent removal. However, problems with the inner liners were more serious. The continual drag of the driving bands caused the liner to be gradually stretched forward. The resulting protrusion at the muzzle could simply be cut off, but in addition the liner began to form a ridge in the barrel near the shoulders of the outer ‘A’ tube, where the inner ‘A’ tube was keyed to the outer. The ridge accumulated copper from the driving bands, which could give sufficient retardation to the projectile to start the fuze, which resulted in a premature detonation either within the bore, or soon after leaving the muzzle. This happened several times during bombardment service, including an occasion when Lord Clive showered pieces of shell over the French destroyer Aventurier. The ‘steel choke’ restriction could be temporarily removed by rubbing down with an emery-covered block pulled back and forth in the bore, but the only permanent solution was to fit new guns with a modified design of liner, which had a different arrangement of internal shoulders.

== Images ==
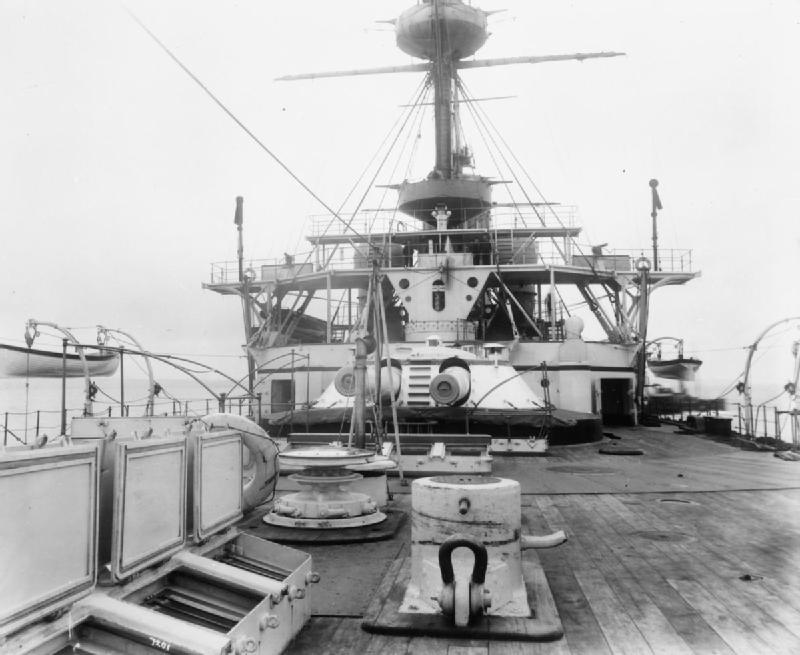
Y turret (aft) guns of HMS Hannibal.

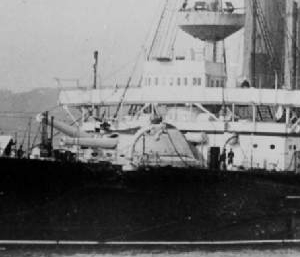
Forward guns of HMS Ocean

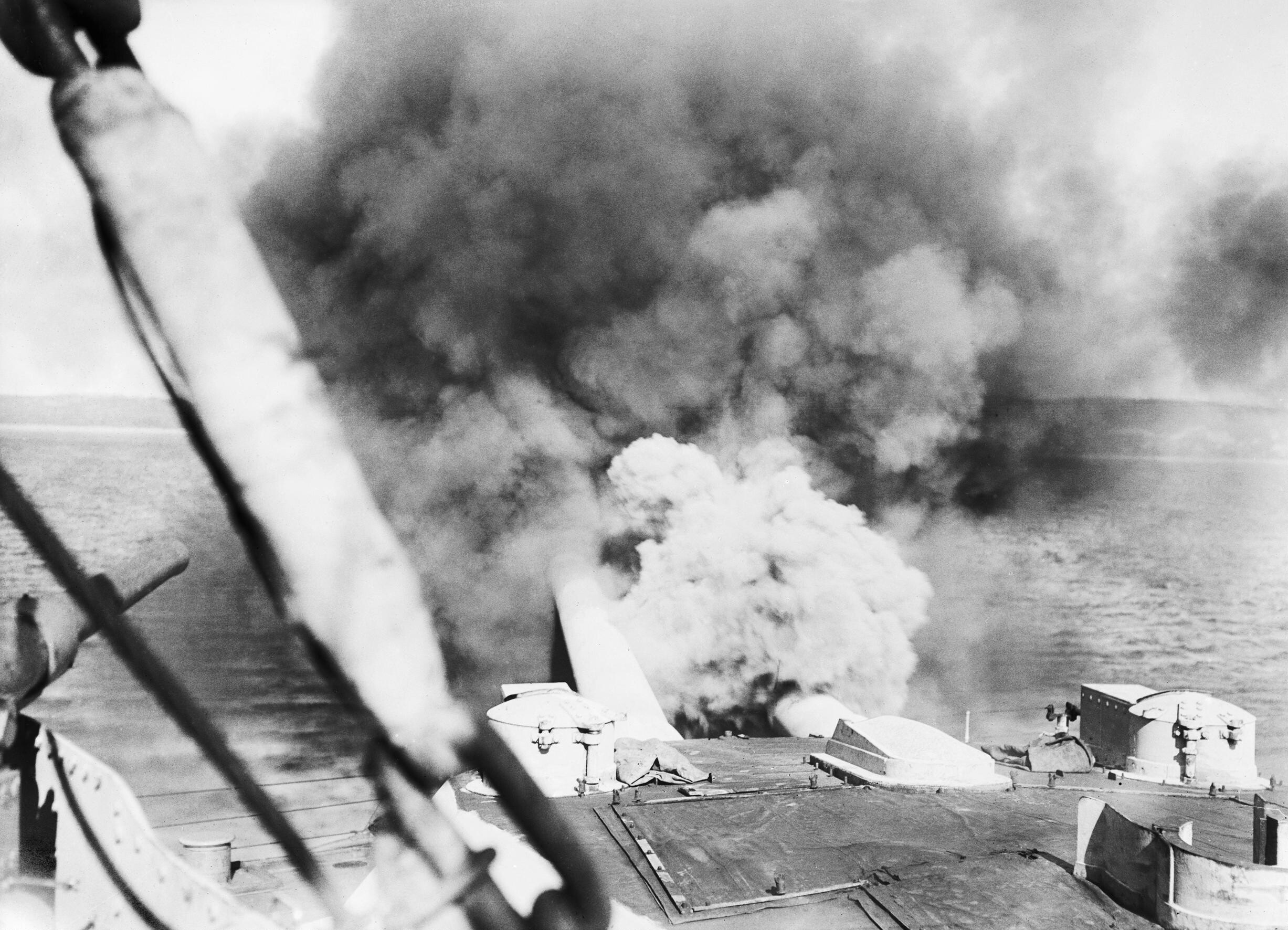
HMS Canopus bombarding Turkish forts, Dardanelles March 1915. Photo by Ernest Brooks.

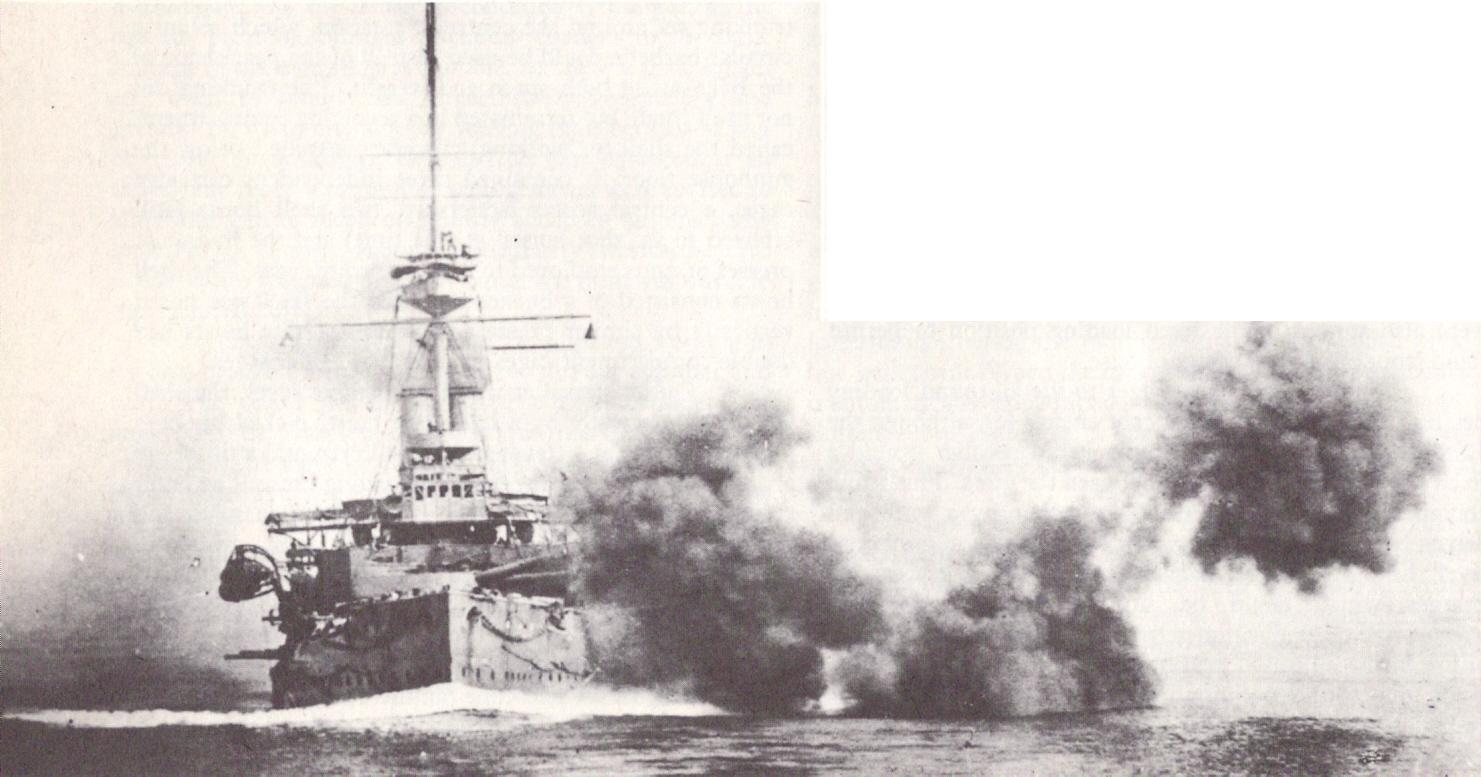
The battleship HMS Illustrious fires her 12-inch (305 mm) Mark VIII guns during gunnery practice.

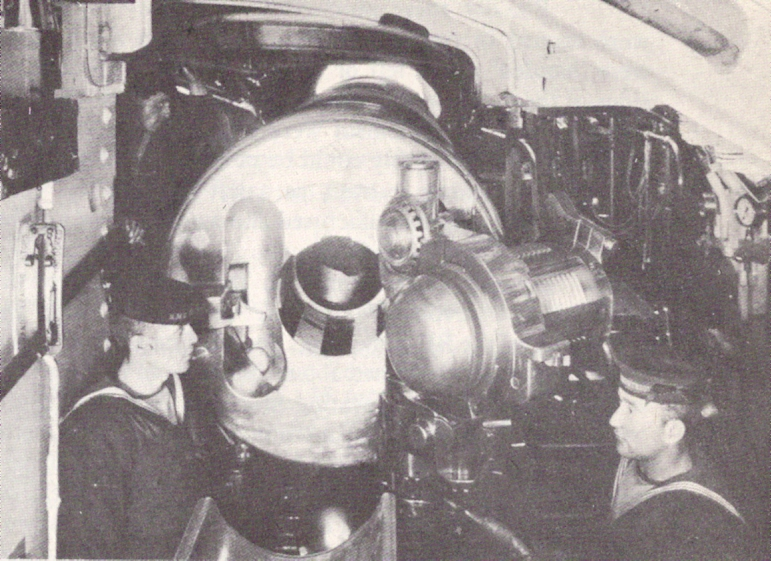
The starboard 12-inch (305 mm) Mark VIII gun in one of the turrets aboard the battleship HMS Illustrious. The gun's breech is open.

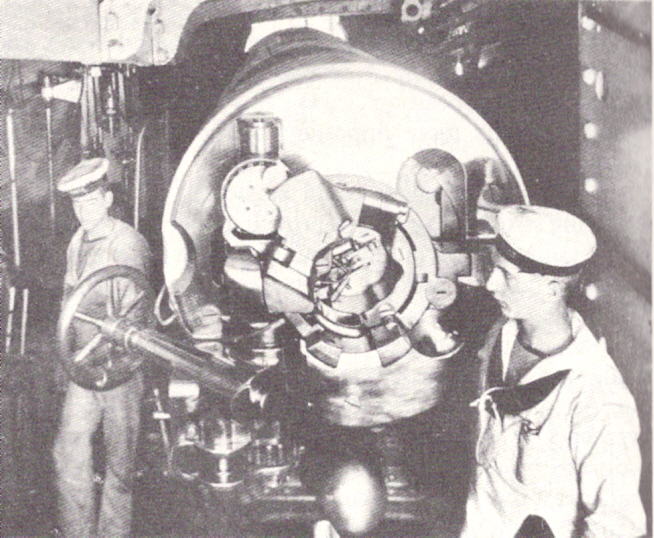
The starboard 12-inch (305 mm) Mark VIII gun in one of the turrets aboard the British battleship HMS Caesar. The gun's breech is closed.

== See also ==
- List of naval guns

=== Weapons of comparable role, performance and era ===
- 12"/35 caliber gun - contemporary US Navy weapon
- 12-inch gun M1895 - contemporary US Army coast defence weapon
- Canon de 305 mm Modèle 1893/96 gun - contemporary French naval and railway weapon

== Bibliography ==
- Text Book of Gunnery, 1902. London: Printed for His Majesty's Stationery Office, by Harrison and Sons, St. Martin's Lane
- I. V. Hogg & L. F. Thurston, British Artillery Weapons & Ammunition 1914–1918. London: Ian Allan, 1972.
- Tony DiGiulian, British 12"/35 (30.5 cm) Mark VIII
