= Munster Training Area =

Military training area in Germany

Coordinates: 53°02′08″N 10°07′07″E

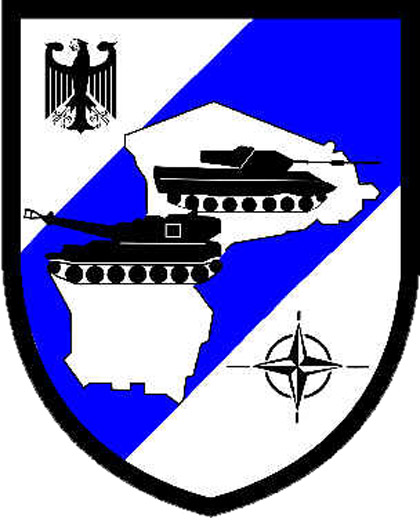
Munster Training Area coat of arms

Location

The Munster Training Area (German: Truppenübungsplatz Munster) is a military training area in Germany on the Lüneburg Heath. It comprises two separate areas with different purposes: Munster North (Munster-Nord) (size: 102 square kilometres (39 sq mi)) and Munster South (Munster-Süd) (size: 74 square kilometres (29 sq mi)). The two areas are separated geographically by the town of Munster and several barracks. When the military training area was established a camp or Lager was built about 1.5 kilometres (0.93 mi) from the town centre which became known as Munsterlager. Between Munster North and South there is a road corridor to the nearby training area of Bergen-Hohne over which exercising troops can transfer from one area to the other. There are many rare and endangered plant species on this terrain today that thrive in the environment created by the training area.

== Munster South Training Area ==
In 1891 the Prussian Ministry of War began to buy up areas of heath and marsh between Munster, Reiningen and Wietzendorf and to lay out a military training area and military camp for the X Hanoverian Army Corps. The camp was first established in June 1893 by the 91st Infantry Regiment (Infanterieregiment 91) from Oldenburg under its commanding officer, Colonel Paul von Hindenburg, who later became the Reichspräsident.

Today there is a barracks here, the Hindenburg-Kaserne, named after him. The terrain, which was originally used for exercises and troop movements, has been used since the formation of the post-war German armed forces, the Bundeswehr, as an artillery range. It has an area of 7,400 hectares (18,000 acres) and lies in the districts of Heidekreis and Celle. On this range, specially constructed for tube artillery, rocket artillery and mortars, weapons fire into the target area from locations lying outside the actual training area.

Live artillery firing takes place at Munster South using M109 and PzH howitzers. In addition, Marder infantry fighting vehicles, equipped with MILAN surface-to-surface anti-tank guided missiles, Luchs recce tanks and Fennek recce vehicles also use the ranges. Training Area South also has bivouac sites and ranges for small arms and anti-tank weapons. Ground-based trials with MILAN surface-surface anti-tank guided missile were carried out here. In addition there are grenade ranges, explosives ranges, infantry battle ranges and target areas for the German Air Force, the Luftwaffe, firing rockets and bombs from their Tornado fighter-bombers. Bölkow Bo 105 anti-tank helicopters exercise here, firing HOT 3105 guided missiles. Exercising troops from Germany, Belgium, the Netherlands and Britain can be accommodated in Trauen Camp (Lager Trauen) where there are facilities for 1,750 soldiers.

== Munster North Training Area ==
In 1916 a chemical weapons production site, Gasplatz Breloh, was built in north Munster. In 1935 this area became the Munster North Training Area. It is located in the districts of Heidekreis, Lüneburg and Uelzen, and has battle training ranges for armoured vehicles.

The training area covers a total of 10,200 hectares (25,000 acres). As well as four major ranges for armoured vehicle mounted weapons and anti-tank guided missiles there are infantry weapon ranges and special ranges for hand-held anti-tank weapons. In addition there are grenade ranges, explosives ranges and a facility for air defence training.

There are also firing positions for artillery and mortars to support combined arms training. Other weapon systems used on this exercise area include the Leopard 2, Marks A5, A6 and A6M. Munster North is also used to exercise the Marder infantry fighting vehicle, as well as the Luchs and Fennek recce vehicles. Even non-military organisations, such as the bomb disposal service (Kampfmittelräumdienst or KMRD) of the state of Lower Saxony, the German Federal Police and police special response units (Spezialeinsatzkommandos), make use of the training facilities.

== Gasplatz Breloh ==
=== First World War ===
In 1916 the so-called Breloh Camp (Breloh-Lager) was built in north Munster by a regiment of gas warfare engineers (‘’Gaspionier-Regiment’’). In January 1917 the Prussian War Office issued an order for the construction of a facility for gas munitions. Gasplatz Breloh was built on a piece of land about 6,500 hectares (16,000 acres) in size in the Raubkammer Forest (part of the present-day Munster North Training Area). Three factories were erected for the manufacture of chemical war material and associated munitions. Production began as early as July that year and, by the end of the First World War in 1918 extensive facilities had been built, the majority of which were working.

==== Factories at Gasplatz Breloh ====
(in the First World War)

Factory	Size	Products
Klopperwerk I	560 m^{2} (6,000 sq ft)	Green Cross (Grünkreuz): Phosgene, Chloropicrin (Chlorpikrin or Klop) and Diphosgene (Perstoff or Per)
Klopperwerk II	560 m^{2} (6,000 sq ft)	Green Cross: Phosgene, Chloropicrin (Klop) and Diphosgene (Per)
Lostwerk I	2,400 m^{2} (26,000 sq ft)	Yellow Cross (Gelbkreuz): Mustard gas (Schwefellost), Lewisite and Dick
Lostwerk II	660 m^{2} (7,100 sq ft)	Yellow Cross: Mustard gas, Lewisite and Dick
Clarkwerk	>2,500 m^{2} (27,000 sq ft)	Blue Cross (Blaukreuz): Clark I Clark II The factory was unfinished at the end of the war in 1918

In addition the site had the following facilities:

- Power station
- Several camps for about 4,500 people
- About 100 km (62 mi) of industrial railway
- A firing range (up to 4,000 m (13,000 ft)) for trials purposes
- Several test sites and buildings
- Several dumps of captured ammunition

Another test facility was planned on the Westerhorn Estate (Gut Westerhorn).

More than 6,000 people (75 officers, 677 NCOs and about 5,775 special staff) produced in these facilities about a quarter of the total war munitions for the German Army at that time. The working conditions were, by modern standards, appalling. Protective clothing did not exist. People handled the dangerous chemicals without concern for their own safety. As well as the production and storage of the actual chemicals, war munitions were also filled here. In addition, captured munitions were stored at Munster; for example, about 20,000 chlorine gas bottles of Russian origin and chemical jars (Nebeltöpfe). Extensive trials were carried out with chemicals and munitions on the firing ranges and test sites.

=== Inter-war period ===
At the end of the war in 1918 the Gasplatz held about 48,000 tonnes (47,000 long tons; 53,000 short tons) of chemical munitions, several thousand tonnes of chemically-filled captured munitions and 40 tank wagons of unfilled chemicals. These supplies were sunk in the North Sea and the Baltic. During the preparations for this there was a tragic accident on 24 October 1919. A train laden with chemical weapons and munitions exploded. Apart from the Clarkwerk factory and the power station almost the entire facility was destroyed, a total of 42 buildings. Chemical grenades were catapulted for miles around and clouds of poison gas threatened the surrounding villages, some having to be evacuated. Many houses in the surrounding area were badly damaged. In addition to the immediate victims of the explosion there were numerous deaths in the months that followed.

The terrain was supposed to be cleared by 1925. Roughly 1,000 workers combed the surface of the land out to a radius of 3 km (1.9 mi) from the explosion site. There was no detection equipment at that time. A considerable quantity of chemical munitions remained live. In 1921 the Hamburg firm of Stolzenberg took over the work that had been previously carried out by König and Evaporator AG. Stolzenberg established a chemical incineration facility and a site to convert chlorine gas and diphosgene. The latter installation exploded on being taken into service in April 1922. In spite of everything, clearance work was completed in 1925 and the remaining facilities were blown up at the behest of the Allies.

In 1935 the Wehrmacht opened Breloh again as a Weapon Testing and Firing Site (Kampfstoffversuchs- und Geschützübungsplatz). The plan was for an overall split of 15% chemical and 85% explosive munitions. The chemical weapons were to be filled with mustard gas (Lost) and phenacyl chloride. The 6,500 hectares (16,000 acres) or so of the old Gasplatz were transferred in 1934 to the Reich Defence Ministry and were expanded through purchases and expropriation to about 10,200 hectares (25,000 acres). The whole complex, which was largely built between 1935 and 1938, was called the Munster North Army Testing Facility (Heeresversuchstelle Munster-Nord), often referred to as the Raubkammer Army Testing Facility. The main purpose of the facility was the testing of chemical weapons that had been developed in Berlin at the Army Chemical Defence Laboratory in Spandau Citadel (Heeresgasschutzlaboratorium Zitadelle Spandau). No. 9 Weapon Testing Office of the Army Weapons Office (Heereswaffenamt) and the Army Chemical Defence Laboratory moved at the beginning of March 1945 from Berlin to Munster (Örtze), due to air raids, and carried on working there until the end of the Second World War.

=== Second World War ===
An extensive range of tests were carried out on a wide variety of shells of various calibres, as well as on mines, projectiles, bombs (up to 500 kg (1,100 lb)) and spray equipment. The substances tried included arsenic oil, hydrogen cyanide, mustard gas (Lost), Tabun, Sarin, cyanogen chloride, phenacyl chloride, Adamsite, Aeroform, Excelsior (10-chlor-9,10-dihydroacridarsin) and many others. Chemical munitions were filled at the so-called "fog-filling point" (Nebelfüllstelle), which had a tank capacity for about 3,000 t (3,000 long tons; 3,300 short tons) of chemical. At this filling point there was a large underground facility that was partly linked with walkways. During a spraying demonstration by the Luftwaffe on 8 September 1944, a Do-217E-3 crashed, killing all those on board. The facilities were mostly disguised as "simple" bunker complexes or as houses in rural style. A network of railway branches linked the individual parts of the site with one another. There was also a link to the Reichsbahn network.

=== After the Second World War ===
Following occupation of the site by British forces in 1945 almost all the chemical installations were demolished in the succeeding years and most of the stocks of chemicals were also destroyed. In spite of that, it has left a dangerous legacy behind which is one of the largest areas of residual contamination caused by armaments in Germany. Since April 1956 there has been intensive work to clear the pollution. Today this is the responsibility of the specialist Group for Chemical Weapon Clearance (Gruppe für Kampfmittelbeseitigung), the Chemical Defence Research Establishment (Wehrwissenschaftliches Institut für Schutztechnologien) and the federal Chemical Weapon and Armament Pollution Disposal Company (Gesellschaft zur Entsorgung chemischer Kampfstoffe und Rüstungsaltlasten).

== Munsterlager ==
In 1891 Munster was still a small village on the Lüneburg Heath with 470 inhabitants. By 1905 its population had grown to 1225. A military camp was established by the railway line from Bremen via Soltau and Munster to Uelzen which was about 1.5 kilometres (0.93 mi) from the town centre of Munster. The first unit to occupy the camp was the 91st Infantry Regiment from Oldenburg in June 1893, commanded by Colonel Paul von Hindenburg, later to be Reichspräsident. Around the turn of the 19th century other troops were stationed there including those involved in the Boxer Rebellion in China and units destined for the German colonies in Africa. In the First World War the camp was used to house about 21,000 prisoners of war.

Belgian and French prisoners in Munsterlager

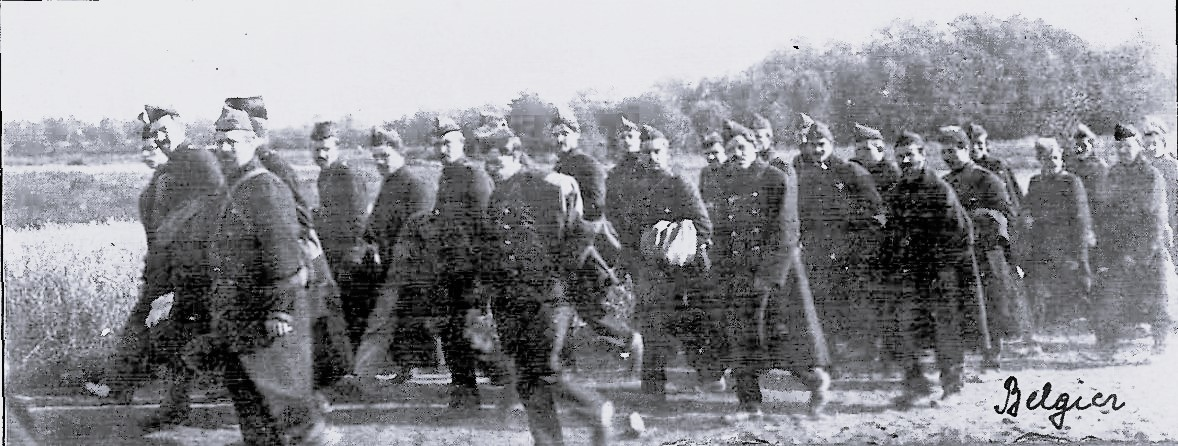

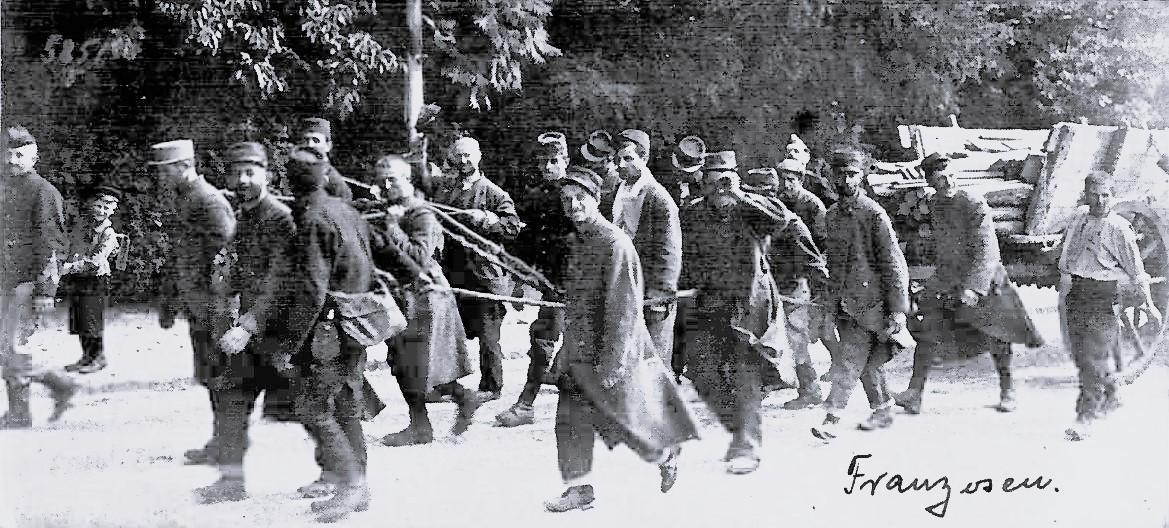

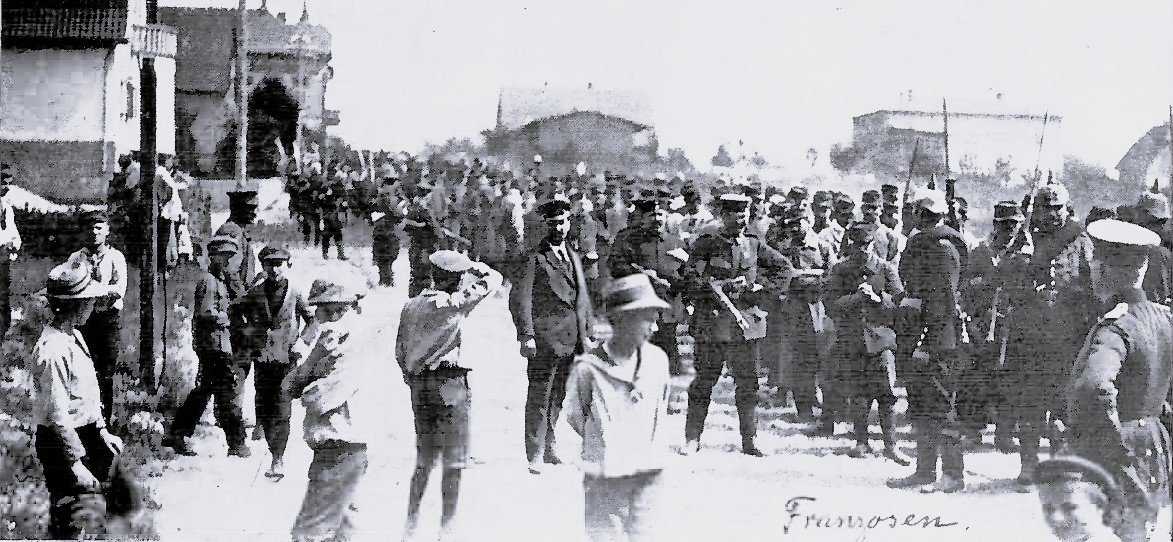

After the occupation of the site by British forces in 1945 the British Occupying Power established the largest prisoner of war release camp soldiers in Germany from this vast military estate owned by the Wehrmacht. In Munster and Breloh about 1.7 million prisoners of war were admitted and returned home. In the facility at Hornheide, the Breloh refugee camp was set up. The different hutted camps, which were given letters of the alphabet by the British (e.g. M Camp), were partly torn down during the 1960s when Munster no longer wanted to be "Munsterlager".

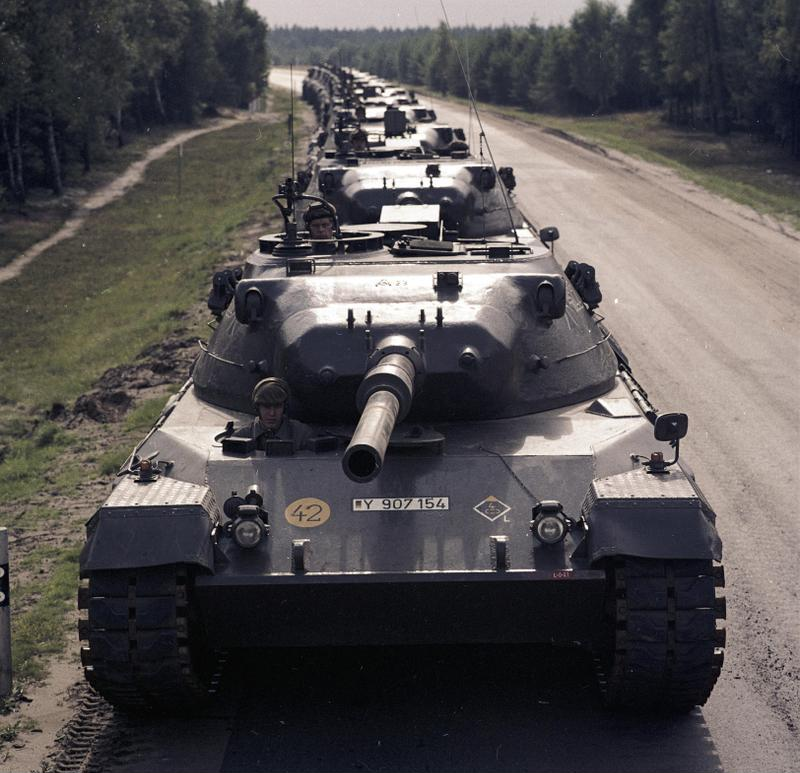
1965: Leopard I main battle tank in Munsterlager

In 1956 Munster was the base for important military installations for the Bundeswehr, Germany's newly formed armed forces. Almost at the same time the Training Area Headquarters, the Garrison Staff, the Armoured Vehicle Training Centre (formerly the Armoured Forces School), the 9th Armoured Demonstration Brigade (Panzerlehrbrigade 9) with the Panzergrenadier School, the Armoured Demonstration Battalion and the Panzergrenadier Demonstration Battalion, 53 Trials Unit (Erprobungsstelle 53) today the Chemical Defence Research Establishment (Wehrwissenschaftliches Institut für Schutztechnologien – ABC-Schutz), the Society for the disposal of chemical warfare agents and old armaments GmbH (Ltd.) (GEKA) and other units and organisations were set up.

The British Forces stationed in Germany, which had maintained a garrison in Munster since the war, gave this up in 1993 and left. After the withdrawal of the British from the remaining open areas were used to build houses and shops. The former barracks was renovated and partly converted. It is largely used today for commercial purposes. The old headquarters building now houses the municipal department of works for the town of Munster, the officers mess has been turned into a hotel.

== Commandants of the Training Area ==
- Colonel Erich Freiherr von Falkenstein: 1 February 1928 to 31 March 1930
- Major General Franz Becker: 1 July 1942 to 30 May 1944

The present commander of Munster Training Area (to 30 June 2008 Colonel Udo Meyer, from 1 July 2008 Colonel Gerd Ahrens) has his headquarters at Bergen-Hohne Training Area which is also subordinated to him. The commander is also in charge of Ehra-Lessien Training Area and Lübtheen Training Area.

== See also ==
- Bergen-Hohne Training Area
- Soltau-Lüneburg Training Area
