= Diggle =

Diggle or Diggles may refer to:

== People ==
- Andy Diggle (born 1971), British comic book writer and former editor of 2000 AD
- Angus Diggle (1956–2019), British solicitor
- Devon Diggle (born 1988), Canadian water polo player
- Edmund Diggle, (1627–1688), English priest
- Edward Diggle (1864–1934), British billiards player
- G. H. Diggle (1902–1993), British chess player
- Graham Diggle (1889–1971), Australian rules football player
- James Diggle, CBE, FBA (born 1944), British classicist
- Joan Roig i Diggle (1917–1936), beatified Spanish catholic
- John Diggle (1847–1920), British Anglican bishop
- Joseph Diggle JP (1849–1917), British clergyman, politician, public servant
- Neston Diggle, CMG, RN (1881–1963), British Royal Navy officer
- Percy Robert Diggle (1887–1977), British rugby union player
- Peter Diggle, (born 1950), British statistician
- Roland Diggle (1885–1954), American musician
- Steve Diggle (born 1955), British musician in the punk band Buzzcocks
- Dr. Diggles, member of the band Dope D.O.D., signed to Duck Down Music
- Cathy Diggles, Miss Canada 1955 at Miss Universe 1955
- J. Diggles, Australian soldier awarded the Military Medal at the 1918 New Year Honours (MM)
- Silvester Diggles (1817–1880), Australian artist and musician

=== Fictional ===
- Andy Diggle, a fictional character from the DC Comics based Arrowverse in the CW network TV show Arrow; see List of supporting Arrow characters
- Dedalus Diggle, a member of the Order of the Phoenix in the Harry Potter universe
- John Diggle (character), a fictional character from the TV series Arrow

== Places ==
- Diggle, Greater Manchester, England, UK; a village in Saddleworth parish, Metropolitan Borough of Oldham, Greater Manchester
- Diggle railway station, Diggle, Oldham, Greater Manchester, England, UK
- Diggle Brook, a tributary of the River Tame, Greater Manchester, England, UK
- Diggle Reservoir, England, UK; see River Tame, Greater Manchester
- Diggle Junction, Huddersfield line, England, UK; a railway junction

== Other ==
- Diggles: The Myth of Fenris, a game released by Innonics on 27 September 2001
- A race of burrowing bird monsters from the rpg roguelike Dungeons of Dredmor
