= Carbonyl diazide =

Names
- IUPAC name Carbonyl diazide
- Other names Carbonyl azide, Carbonic diazide, Azido ketone

Identifiers
CAS Number	14435-92-8
3D model (JSmol)	Interactive image
ChemSpider	11676745
PubChem CID	18772028
- InChI: InChI=1S/CN6O/c2-6-4-1(8)5-7-3 Key: VQXINLNPICQTLR-UHFFFAOYSA-N
- SMILES: C(=O)(N=[N+]=[N-])N=[N+]=[N-]

Properties
Chemical formula	CO(N_{3})_{2}
Molar mass	112.052 g·mol^{−1}
Appearance	colorless liquid
Melting point	16 °C (61 °F; 289 K)

Hazards
- Occupational safety and health (OHS/OSH)
Main hazards	Shock-sensitive explosive
- Except where otherwise noted, data are given for materials in their standard state (at 25 °C [77 °F], 100 kPa). Infobox references

Carbonyl diazide is a chemical compound with the chemical formula CO(N_{3})_{2}. In terms of its structure, it can be described as two azide groups −N_{3} covalently attached to the carbonyl group −C(=O)− by single bonds. It can be prepared by way of the reaction between triphosgene and tetra-n-butylammonium azide, in a dimethyl ether or diethyl ether solution.

The first synthesis of carbonyl diazide was reported in 1894, although there have been multiple alternative syntheses since then.

Like all azides, it is a explosive compound that readily detonated, therefore care is needed when handling this chemical.
