= Musical Opinion =

European classical music magazine

- Categories: Music
- Frequency: Quarterly
- Founded: 1877
- Company: Musical Opinion Ltd
- Country: United Kingdom
- Based in: London
- Language: English
- Website: www.musicalopinion.com
- ISSN: 0027-4623
- OCLC: 1758905

Musical Opinion, often abbreviated to MO, was a European classical music magazine edited and produced in the UK. It was among the oldest such periodicals in the UK, having been continuously in publication from 1877 until 2026. The original title was Musical Opinion and Music Trade Review: British, Foreign and Colonial (1877–1964). On 31 March 2026, its publisher announced that Musical Opinion and its sister publication The Organ had ceased trading, that subscriptions would cease and that no further publication would appear.

In its first year Musical Opinion critically reviewed Brahms' new Second Symphony, and in 1879 his Violin Concerto. The October 1936 issue carried an interview with Rachmaninov and championed the young William Walton as Britain's most exciting young composer. In the 1890s it was competitive because it was supported by income from advertising.

In 1927, when the editor and proprietor was Arthur W. Fitzsimmons (died 1948), the composer Havergal Brian became assistant editor of Musical Opinion. He held the post until 1940. This period could be said to have been its heyday: it was then a leading journal in its field, with each issue comprising over 100 large-format pages and a wide range of subject matter (including much contemporary music) being covered by some of the most prominent British writers on music of the time. Regular contributors included Gerald Abraham, Eric Blom, Dmitri Calvocoressi, Eaglefield Hull, Alfred Kalmus, Basil Maine and Percy Scholes. Other frequent contributors include the American composer and organist, Roland Diggle, and the British composer, Joseph Holbrooke.

In 1921 Musical Opinion launched a sister magazine, The Organ.

Between 1984 and 2009, Musical Opinion was edited by Denby Richards. As of 2024, the editor is Robert Matthew-Walker (since April 2009), who is also editor of The Organ.

From the time of its first issue (September 1877), Musical Opinion appeared monthly; but in the 1990s increasing production and postal costs threatened the magazine's survival. In 1994 Musical Opinion became a quarterly publication—with regular subscribers being kept up to date with information and reviews in the intervening months by means of 'Supplements' posted to them. In 2000 these supplements were reduced from two per quarter to one. In 2003, Musical Opinion abandoned the idea of posted 'Supplements' and once more became a straightforward 'newsstand' publication appearing quarterly.
