= White Cross (chemical warfare) =

German WWI tear gas

White Cross (Weißkreuz) is a German World War I chemical warfare agent consisting of one or more lachrymatory agents: bromoacetone (BA), bromobenzyl cyanide (Camite), bromomethyl ethyl ketone (homomartonite, Bn-stoff), chloroacetone (Tonite, A-stoff), ethyl bromoacetate, and/or xylyl bromide.

During World War I, White Cross was also a generic code name used by the German Army for artillery shells with an irritant chemical payload affecting the eyes and mucous membranes.

== See also ==
- Blue Cross (chemical warfare)
- Green Cross (chemical warfare)
- Yellow Cross (chemical warfare)
