= Robert Matthew-Walker =

English composer and writer (born 1939)

- Born: 23 July 1939 (age 87); Lewisham, London

Robert Matthew-Walker (born 23 July 1939) is an English composer, writer, editing marketer and broadcaster, mainly involved in classical music.

== Early life and career ==
Robert Matthew-Walker was born in Lewisham, London, and studied at Goldsmiths College; the University of London, the London College of Music, and the London College of Printing (now University of the Arts, London). After leaving the Army in 1962, following service at the Joint Air Reconnaissance Intelligence Centre (JARIC), the War Office, and in North Africa, he studied composition privately with the French composer Darius Milhaud in Paris from 1962 to 1963.

He was employed in the City as Company Secretary for Thom & Cook Ltd and founded the Tunnel Club rock venue in Greenwich in 1968. In 1970, he joined CBS Records and was appointed head of their classical department in London just three months later. By 1974, he became the director of marketing for CBS. He later served as the director of Masterworks Marketing, Europe, for CBS in Paris.

In 1975, he joined RCA Records in London as head of the classical department.

He founded several specialist classical labels, including Phoenix Records, Trax Records, and AVM Classics. Matthew-Walker has produced over 130 albums and won the Grand Prix du Disque of the Academie Charles Cros in 1980 for his recording of Brian Ferneyhough's Sonatas for String Quartet by the Berne String Quartet (the first recording of any of Ferneyhough's works), amongst several other recording awards for his work as a producer. He compiled the first two series of '100 Greatest Classics' for Filmtrax, and for Stylus 'The Pavarotti Collection' (reissued by Decca as 'The Essential Pavarotti') which sold over 600,000 copies and reached no. 8 in the pop album charts. He also appeared with the disco rapper Adamski on a dance single, 'Kraktali Daze'.

Robert Matthew-Walker was a member of The Critics' Circle. From 1984 to 1988 he edited the magazine Music and Musicians, and between 1996 and 2008, the UK Grieg Society's journal The Grieg Companion (Vols 1–12). In April 2009, he became the editor of Musical Opinion and its sister-publication, The Organ; he is also a contributor to Classic Record Collector. He has broadcast many times, and in 1980, he wrote and presented an eight-part History of Classical Recording for BBC Radio. He has published sixteen books, not all of them on musical subjects, and in total has sold half a million copies. He has also been a Fellow of the Atlantic Council of Great Britain.

As a composer, his output includes six symphonies (1956-68), the Symphonic Variations for Orchestra (1955), concertos for flute, horn, oboe and cello, four string quartets and various violin and piano sonatas. Works such as Days To Remember, Three Pieces for Rock Band (1966), and the Meditation on the Death of Elvis Presley (1980) indicate an interest in rock music.

== Bibliography ==
- Muhammad Ali: His Fights in the Ring, London (1978) ISBN 9780170055710
- Elvis Presley – A Study in Music (1982)
- Simon and Garfunkel, Hippocrene Books (1983) ISBN 0-88254-729-1
- Rachmaninoff: His Life and Times, Omnibus Press (1984) ISBN 0-7119-0253-4
- David Bowie – Theatre of Music (1985)
- Madonna: The Biography, Pan books (1991) ISBN 0-330-31482-3
- The Symphonies of Robert Simpson (various authors, ed. Matthew-Walker) (1991)
- Alun Hoddinott on Record: A Composer and the Gramophone, DGR Books (1993) ISBN 978-1-898343-01-1
- The Recordings of Edvard Grieg: A Tradition Captured, DGR Books (1993) ISBN 978-1-898343-02-8
- Cincinnati Interludes (Sir Eugene Goossens, ed. R. Matthew-Walker), DGR Books (1995) ISBN 978-1-898343-05-9
- Havergal Brian: Reminiscences and Observations, DGR Books (1995) ISBN 978-1-898343-04-2
- Heartbreak Hotel: The Life and Music of Elvis Presley Castle Communications (1995) ISBN 1-86074-055-3
- The Music of Vyacheslav Artyomov: An Introduction, DGR Books (1997) ISBN 978-1-898343-06-6
- Broadway to Hollywood: the Musical and the Cinema (1998) ISBN 978-1-86074-145-6
- Mahler's 'Das Lied Von Der Erde' – Analytical Aspects, DGR Books (2002) ISBN 9781898343097
- Sorrow, Tomorrow. A Story of London, DGR Books (2015) ISBN 978-1-898343-15-8
- The House of Brindley – organ builders of Sheffield (Bryan Hughes, ed. R. Matthew-Walker) Musical Opinion (2015) ISBN 978-1-898343-14-1
- Edvard Grieg – a biographical study DGR Books (2016) ISBN 978-1-898343-00-4
- The New Grieg Companion (Ed. R. Matthew-Walker) Grieg Society of Great Britain (2020)
- Aspects of Grieg – 18 short essays Grieg Society of Great Britain (2021)
- Robert Simpson – A Memoir Musical Opinion (2021)
- Gustav Mahler: Three Essays DGR2 Books (2023)
- Murdad-Trinimansk; a Story from London DGR2 Books (2023) ISBN 978-1-803528-24-3
