= Green Cross (chemical warfare) =

German WWI chemical pulmonary agent

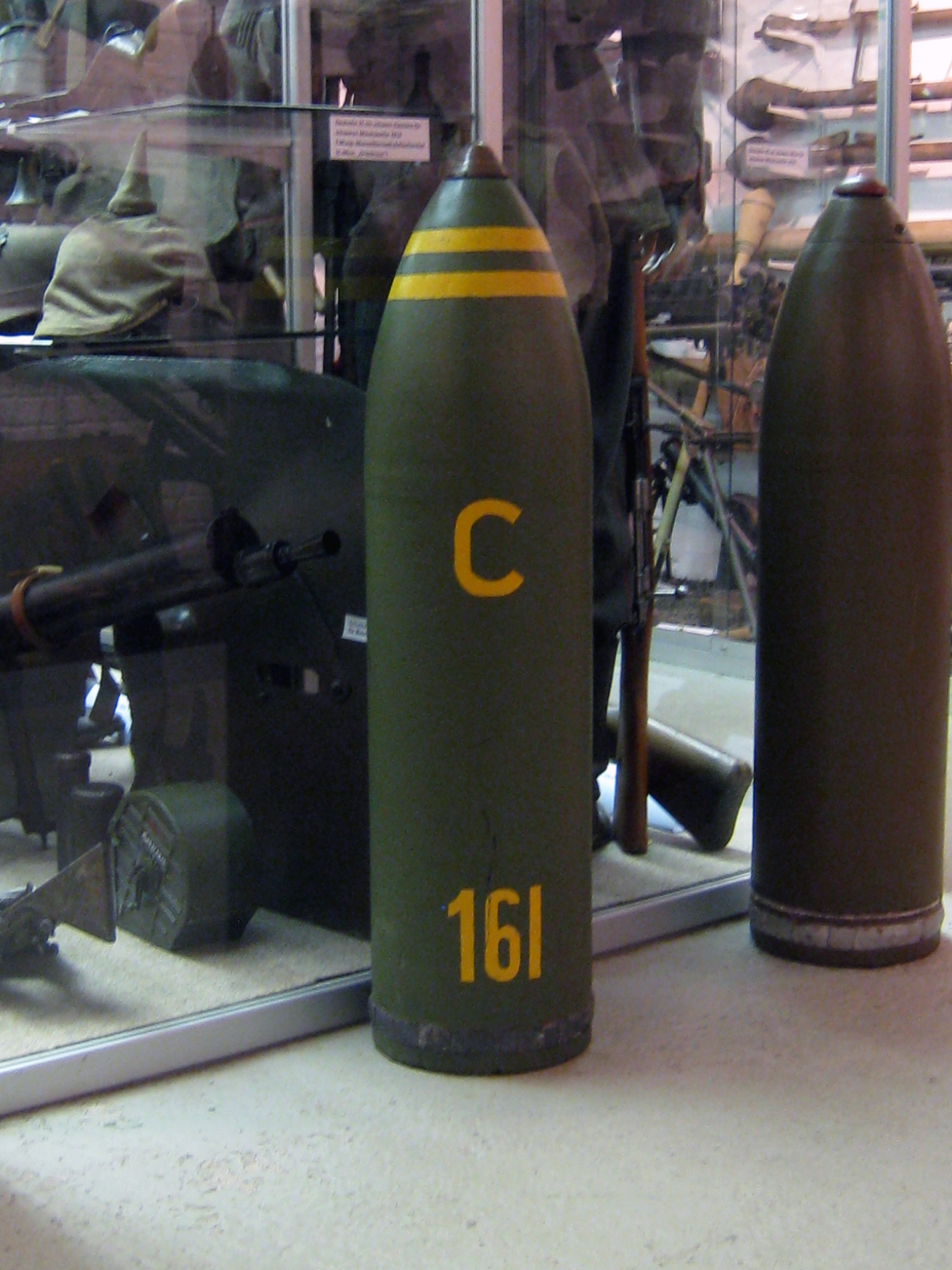
Green Cross artillery shell

Green Cross (Grünkreuz) is a German World War I chemical warfare pulmonary agent consisting of chloropicrin (PS, Aquinite, Klop), phosgene (CG, Collongite) and/or trichloromethyl chloroformate (diphosgene, Surpalite, Perstoff).

Green Cross is also a generic World War I German marking for artillery shells with pulmonary agents (chemical payload affecting the lungs). The tip of the projectile with the fuse end painted green and a green cross at the bottom of the cartridge.

Other Green Cross mixtures were based on phosgene and/or diphosgene.

The first use of Green Cross was on May 31, 1915, in a German offensive in Ypres. The mixture was chlorine-phosgene, with 95% and 5%.

== See also ==
- Blue Cross (chemical warfare)
- Yellow Cross (chemical warfare)
- White Cross (chemical warfare)
