= The Organ (magazine) =

British magazine

- Editor: Robert Matthew-Walker
- Categories: Music
- Frequency: Quarterly
- Founded: 1921
- Company: Musical Opinion Ltd
- Country: United Kingdom
- Based in: London
- Language: English
- Website: www.theorganmag.com
- ISSN: 0030-4883

The Organ is a quarterly magazine about the world of the pipe organ. It is based in London, United Kingdom, but features organs in other countries too. It was established in 1921 as a sister-publication of Musical Opinion. The publisher is the company Musical Opinion Ltd. Its editor-in-chief has been Robert Matthew-Walker.
