= HMS General Wolfe =

World War I British monitor

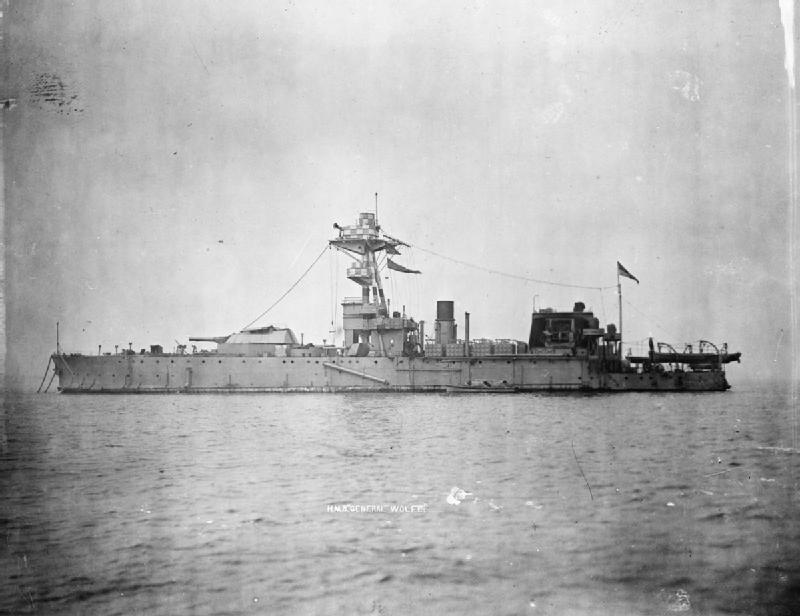
- General Wolfe in 1918

History

United Kingdom
- Name: General Wolfe
- Namesake: General James Wolfe
- Ordered: 6 January 1915
- Builder: Palmers, Newcastle
- Laid down: January 1915
- Launched: 9 September 1915
- Commissioned: 27 October 1915
- Out of service: 1919
- Nickname(s): "Elephant and Castle"
- Fate: Scrapped, 1923
- Notes: Made the longest-range shot in the history of the Royal Navy

General characteristics 9 November 1915
- Class & type: Lord Clive-class monitor
- Displacement: 5,900 long tons (5,995 t) legend
- Length: 335 ft 6 in (102.3 m)
- Beam: 87 ft 2 in (26.6 m)
- Draught: 9 ft 7 in (2.9 m)
- Propulsion: 2 × shafts; triple-expansion steam engines, 2 × boilers, 2,500 ihp
- Speed: 8 knots (14.8 km/h; 9.2 mph)
- Complement: 194
- Armament: 2 × BL 12 inches (305 mm) guns in a single turret; 2 × 12 pdr (76 mm) guns on single mounts; 1 × 3 pdr (47 mm) high angle (HA) gun; 1 × 2 pdr (40 mm) HA gun on a single mount; 4 × 0.303 in (7.7 mm) Vickers machine gun

General characteristics 11 November 1918
- Displacement: 6,850-long-ton (6,960 t)
- Draught: 8 ft 9 in (2.7 m) forward; 13 ft 2 in (4.0 m) aft
- Armament: 1 × BL 18-inch (457 mm) Mark I gun in a single mount; 2 × BL 12-inch (304.8 mm) Mk VIII guns in a single turret; 2 × 6-inch (150 mm) guns; 2 × 3-inch (76 mm) guns on single mounts; 2 × 2 pdr (40 mm) HA gun on single mounts

HMS General Wolfe, also known as Wolfe, was a Lord Clive-class monitor which was built in 1915 for shore-bombardment duties in the First World War. Her class of eight ships was armed by four obsolete Majestic-class pre-dreadnoughts which had their 12-inch guns and mounts removed, modified and installed in the newly built monitors. Wolfe spent her entire war service with the Dover Patrol, bombarding the German-occupied Belgian coastline, which had been heavily fortified. In the spring of 1918 she was fitted with an 18-inch (457 mm) gun, with which she made the longest-range firing in the history of the Royal Navy—36,000-yard (20 mi)—on a target at Snaeskerke, Belgium. After the war, she was laid up before being stripped and put up for sale in 1920. She was finally scrapped in 1923.

== Background and construction ==
The outbreak of the First World War and the rapid fall of Belgium into German hands meant that for the first time in decades the North Sea between the United Kingdom and Europe would not be wholly surrounded by friendly or neutral powers. In order to harass the Germans occupying the Belgian coast, and to prevent the use of ports by Imperial German Navy warships, vessels were needed which could traverse the shallow coastal waters and bombard the enemy. At this time aircraft were still relatively primitive and therefore orders were placed for shallow-draught vessels with long-range guns, the Abercrombie-class monitors.

The speed with which the Abercrombie class of monitor had commenced construction, coupled with the prospect of large-scale shore bombardment presented by the entry of the Ottoman Empire into the First World War led to Winston Churchill, First Lord of the Admiralty and political head of the Royal Navy writing to First Sea Lord Jacky Fisher 11 December 1914;

I propose as a basis of discussion, that in addition to the 4 Schwab monitors, we prepare 8 more at a cost of not more than £700,000 apiece. These vessels should be armed with 13.5-inch (343 mm) or 15-inch (381 mm) guns, two or four in each as convenient.

There were however no spare usable guns. Three 13.5-inch guns and mountings were free after the sinking of HMS Audacious, but there were no turrets available. Although 15-inch guns and turrets would later be re-allocated to monitors, at this time it was not thought to be a feasible option while the Queen Elizabeth class and Revenge-class battleships were being completed. It was then suggested that the 12-inch (305 mm) guns and barbettes of the obsolete pre-dreadnought Majestic-class battleships be removed and placed in the monitors while the older ships were utilised as transports and hulks. Admiral Percy Scott, the foremost gunnery expert in the navy was consulted, who recommended that if the elevation of the guns was increased from their then limit of 13.5° to 30° then a comfortable range of 21,000-yard (19 km) could be reached.

Five of the monitors were allocated to the firm of Harland and Wolff, to be constructed at their Belfast and Govan yards. Another, which became HMS Prince Rupert was built at William Hamilton & Company of Port Glasgow and another at Scotts' shipyard at Greenock. This left the monitor provisionally named M9. Initially the order for her went to Fairfield's on 23 December 1914. Due to a mass re-allocation of resources caused by the halting of capital ship construction, the construction of the former battleship, now the battlecruiser HMS Renown building at Fairfield was speeded up, while capacity at Palmer's in the North of England had been increased by the transfer of HMS Repulse to Clydebank. The order for M9 was therefore given to Palmer's Hebburn-on-Tyne yard on 6 January 1916 who also received the order for its two 4-cylinder triple-expansion engines.

Before M9 was laid down at Hebburn, it was decided from which ship she would receive her main-armament. On 1 January 1915 it was decided that HMS Victorious would surrender one of her two 12-inch turrets, which was converted in situ by the Elswick Ordnance Company on Tyneside and then removed by crane—waiting dockside at Elswick until the monitor was launched and ready to have it fitted. The hull form was similar to the Abercrombie class, except that due to the lighter main armament the hull could be made slighter narrower and shorter, which meant that even with 15-foot (5 m) bulges she would be able to berth in most docks—a severe handicap for most monitors.

M9, so named as it was the ninth monitor laid down for the Royal Navy, was originally intended to be named simply Wolfe after the victor of the Battle of the Plains of Abraham, James Wolfe. On 15 February 1915 she was renamed Sir James Wolfe before receiving the name she would be launched under, General Wolfe, on 8 March. In common with all her sister-ships, which were named for famous British soldiers, the title of the ship's namesake was most often dropped—thus Wolfe.

== Early career ==
Wolfe was launched at Hebburn on 9 September 1915, and commissioned for service on 9 November under Commander Neston William Diggle, who had been appointed to her on 27 October. She was the last of her class to complete, and arrived at Dover for service with The Dover Patrol on 12 November. Her sister-ships had already performed a number of shore bombardments, and Wolfe had to wait until 25 January 1916, when Marshal Foch of the French Army requested a demonstration of the monitors. Wolfe went to sea under Captain John Alfred Moreton, and flew the flag of Vice-Admiral Reginald Bacon, the patrol's commander-in-chief, who had served with Moreton in the submarine service. Anchored off the Belgian coast in the afternoon of the 26th, Wolfe and six other monitors bombarded the German artillery batteries at Westende, between Nieuport and Ostend, each of the larger monitors firing about eleven rounds with spotting (observation of the fall of shot) provided by aircraft.

On 24 April 1916, Wolfe and her sister-ship Prince Eugene were detailed to cover the laying of a net barrage twelve miles off the Belgian coast, stretching twenty miles from Nieuport to Zeebrugge. Wolfe was spotted by the Tirpitz battery (four 11-inch (279 mm) guns) and straddled at a range of 32,000-yard (18 mi). She steamed out of range, only to be ineffectively attacked by German aircraft, which Wolfe responded to with shrapnel shell. She then provided cover for British destroyers when the Germans attempted to press home a torpedo-boat attack. Afterwards, up until September when the weather turned wintry, Wolfe and the other 12-inch monitors patrolled the Belgian coast along with other monitors, destroyers and drifters to prevent the Germans breaking out or laying more mines, or sweeping up British minefields. By dint of their enormous beam and large guns, the 12-inch monitors were thought to be invulnerable to all warships but cruisers.

During the build-up to the reopening of the Somme offensive on 15 September 1916, the Dover Patrol was asked to tie-down the enemy forces on the coast of Belgium. From 8 September to 15 September all the monitors of the patrol were engaged, and the 12-inch monitors, including Wolfe, fired two hundred of the three hundred heavy rounds fired in this period. They also acted as aiming marks for the larger 15-inch gunned monitors. For the next twelve months, weather permitting, the monitors continued the unglamorous task of patrolling. In July 1917, Wolfe with a number of her sister-ships was taken off patrolling in preparation for Operation Hush, a planned landing on the Belgian coast by the 1st Division. She and HMS General Craufurd would have been tasked with towing one of three 540-foot-long (160 m) pontoons, each of which would have been capable of landing hundreds of men as well as tanks, guns and transport. The landing had been designed to coincide with Allied success at the 3rd Battle of Ypres which opened on 31 July 1917. This offensive faltered, however, so it was deemed too dangerous to attempt an assault on the coast. The monitors, which had been training at South West Reach in the River Thames without leave since July, were ordered to Portsmouth on 2 October. Wolfe arrived on 4 October and was dry-docked for maintenance.

== 18-inch monitor ==
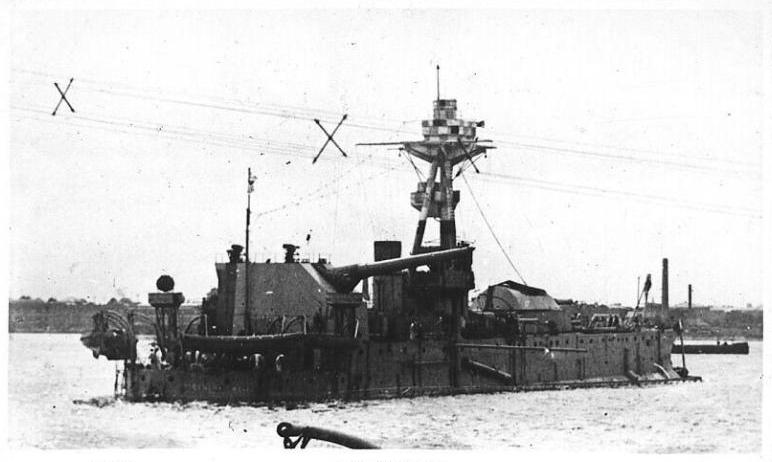
Starboard quarter view of Wolfe showing her 18-inch gun to good effect.

In the new year of 1918, Wolfe was selected to be converted to take an 18-inch (457 mm) gun along with Lord Clive and Prince Eugene. The mounting for the gun, the largest in service with any navy, was named the "15-inch B C.D.". "15-inch B" was the code name for the 18-inch gun itself, and C.D., for "Coast Defence" reflected the possible usage of the mount on land. The mounting was designed and produced by the Elswick Ordnance Company and due to labour troubles, although ordered in October 1917, it was not completed until May, and finally arrived in Portsmouth for installation on Wolfe on 20 June 1918. Wolfe had been taken in hand by Portsmouth Dockyard on 5 April for the structural modifications required to take the weight of the 18-inch gun and mounting on her quarterdeck. The total weight of the mounting was 384 tons, not including the weight of sixty shells and seventy-two full charges of cordite. The gun itself, which was fixed to starboard, had been intended for "A" turret of the large light cruiser HMS Furious and was fitted on 9 July. Wolfe was ready for gun trials on 7 August, which took place off the Isle of Wight and were successful. The mounting, with its large box-shaped shield, so disfigured the stern of the ship that it earned Wolfe the nickname of "Elephant and Castle".

On 15 August the monitor returned to the Dover Patrol, the first of the 18-inch monitors to re-enter service. She had a new commanding officer, Commander S. B. Boyd-Richardson. The rest of August and most of September she saw no action.

In cooperation with Allied forces attacking on the coast of Belgium, the monitors were used on a protracted shore bombardment. In the night of 27/28 September, the seven monitors available to the Patrol bombarded targets near Ostend and Zeebruge, using their sub-calibre (smaller) guns, to trick the Germans into thinking that a night landing by Allied forces might be made there (following the earlier Ostend and Zeebrugge Raids in April).

By dawn the monitors had arranged themselves in three divisions off the West Deep, where they could harass German lines of communication far inland. Wolfe was in Division III with the new-completed coast defence ship HMS Gorgon. Wolfe was anchored parallel to the coastline, and at 07:32 opened fire on the railway bridge at Snaeskerke (four miles south of Ostend) at a range of 36,000-yard (32,918 m) away. She therefore fired the heaviest shell from the largest gun at the longest range up to that time, and at the longest range any Royal Navy ship has fired in action. During the rest of the day Wolfe fired fifty-two 18-inch shells out of her supply of sixty at Snaeskerke, all landing close to the target.

For the next two weeks, Wolfe and the other monitors of the patrol kept up an intermittent bombardment of the Belgian coast, interrupted by bad weather or lack of air support for spotting the fall of shot. In mid-October the Germans evacuated the Belgian coast and the monitors returned to Sheerness when the Armistice was signed. Wolfe paid off on 19 November 1918.

== Post-war fate ==
General Wolfe was placed on the sale list by Admiralty order on 7 April 1920. It had been announced on the 6th that she, in company with the other monitors lying at Immingham being tended by care and maintenance parties, would travel singly to the Portsmouth Royal Dockyard to have guns and other useful fittings removed, after which they would then return to the Humber. In December 1920 her 18-inch gun was removed and placed into storage; it was scrapped in 1933. The ship was sold to Thos. W. Ward on 9 May 1921 and broken up at Hayle in 1923.

== In command ==
- Commander N. W. Diggle
- Captain J. A. Moreton
- Commander Sydney Boyd Boyd-Richardson

== Bibliography ==
- Buxton, Ian (2008) [1978]. Big Gun Monitors. Seaforth Publishing. ISBN 978-1-84415-719-8.
- Colledge, J. J.; Wardlow, Ben & Bush, Steve (2020). Ships of the Royal Navy: The Complete Record of All Fighting Ships of the Royal Navy from the 15th Century to the Present (5th ed.). Barnsley, UK: Seaforth Publishing. ISBN 978-1-5267-9327-0.
- Dittmar, F.J.; Colledge, J.J. (1972). British Warships: 1914–1919. Shepperton: Ian Allan Ltd. ISBN 0-7110-0380-7.
- Gilbert, Martin (1972). Winston S. Churchill Companion, Parts 1 and 2. Vol. III. London: Heinemann.
- Preston, Antony (1985). "Great Britain and Empire Forces". In Gray, Randal (ed.). Conway's All the World's Fighting Ships 1906–1921. Annapolis, Maryland: Naval Institute Press. pp. 1–104. ISBN 0-85177-245-5.
