= John Alfred Moreton =

British military personnel

Captain John Alfred Moreton, CMG, DSO, Croix de Guerre (France), Légion d'honneur (France), Order of Leopold (Belgium), China Medal (Boxer Rising with bar for Taku Forts) was an officer of the Royal Navy active in the First World War. For a short period of time in November 1919 he was military governor of the Latvian city of Riga.

== Naval career ==
Moreton joined the Royal Navy in 1891, and was promoted to lieutenant on 31 December 1898.

In early August 1902 he was appointed to the submarine depot ship HMS Hazard, to take command of HM Submarine No.3. His superior was Captain Reginald Bacon (captain of Hazard), who appreciated Moreton and asked to have him as his first lieutenant on HMS Dreadnought.

Promoted to captain on 1 January 1916, he commanded the monitors General Wolfe and Erebus. He took a leading role in the British Campaign in the Baltic 1918-19 as part of the Allied intervention in the Russian Civil War. For a short period of time in November 1919, he was Military Governor of the Latvian city of Riga.
