= Operation Hush =

Abortive military operation in First World War

- Part of The First World War
- The Yser front in 1917
Date	June–October 1917
Location	Nieuwpoort, Belgian coast 51°07′N 02°45′E
Result	Cancelled

Belligerents
United Kingdom	Germany

Commanders and leaders
Douglas Haig; Henry Rawlinson; Sir Reginald Bacon; John Du Cane	Friedrich Sixt von Armin; Ludwig von Schröder

Strength
5 Divisions	3 Marine divisions; 1 Army division

Casualties and losses
None	None

Operation Hush was a British plan for amphibious landings on the Belgian coast in 1917 during the First World War. The landings were to be combined with an attack from Nieuwpoort and the Yser bridgehead, left over since the Battle of the Yser in 1914. Plans were considered in 1915 and 1916, then shelved due to operations elsewhere.

Operation Hush was intended to begin once the Third Battle of Ypres, the main offensive at Ypres, had advanced to Roulers, Koekelare and Thourout, with advances by the French and Belgians in between. On 10 July, Marine-Korps-Flandern conducted Unternehmen Strandfest (Operation Beach Party) a spoiling attack to forestall an Allied coastal operation. The Germans used mustard gas for the first time, captured part of the bridgehead over the Yser and annihilated two British infantry battalions.

Operation Hush was cancelled on 14 October 1917, as the advance at Ypres was too far behind schedule. In April 1918, the Dover Patrol raided Zeebrugge to sink blockships in the canal entrance to trap U-boats, which closed the canal for a short time. From September to October 1918, the Belgian coast was occupied by the Allies during the Fifth Battle of Ypres.

== Background ==
=== Strategic developments ===
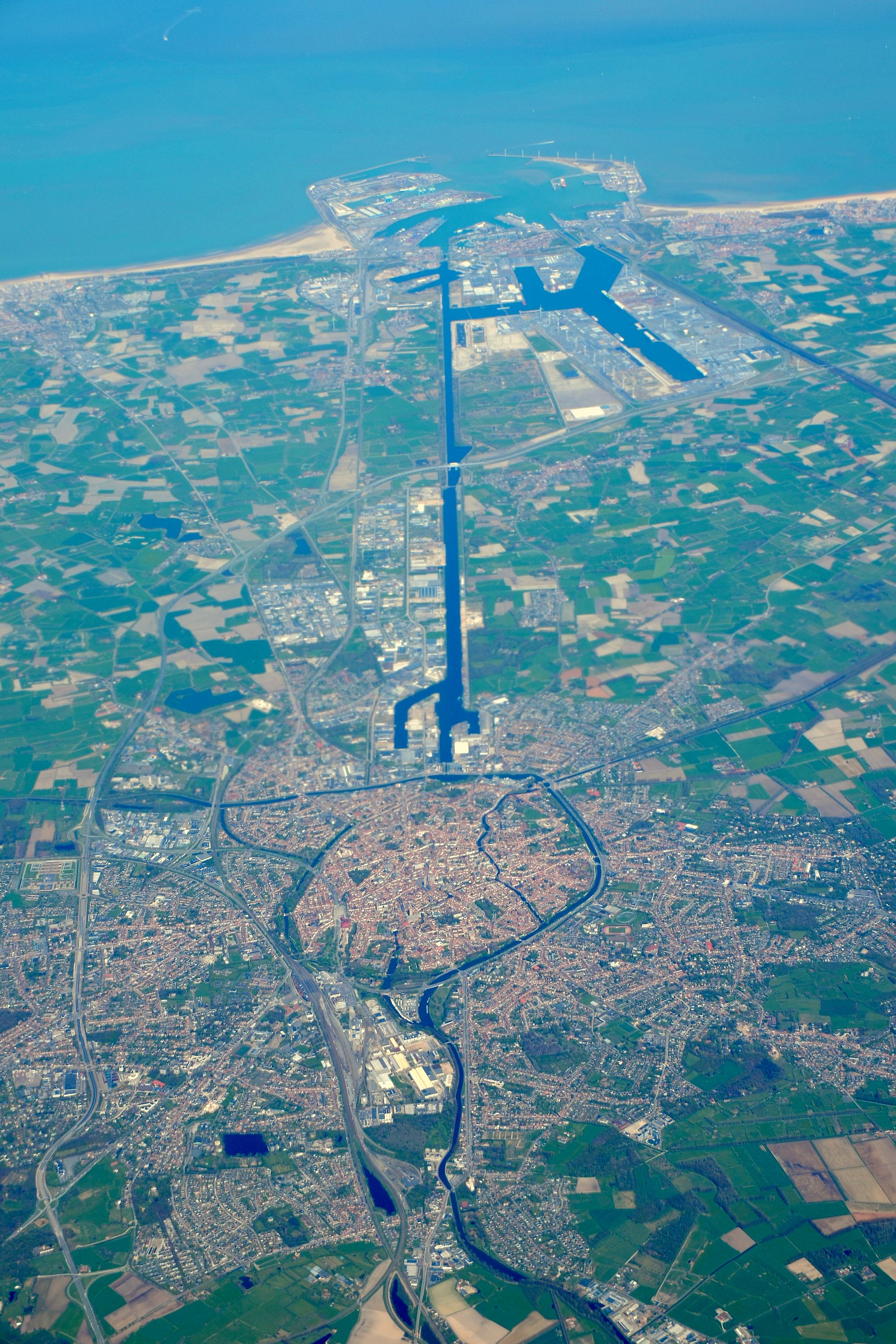
Aerial view of Bruges and the Boudewijnkanaal canal (April 2022)

The German occupation of the Belgian coast in 1914 caused the Admiralty swiftly to advocate their removal. On 26 October 1914 the First Lord, Winston Churchill wrote to Sir John French, commander of the British Expeditionary Force (BEF) "We must have him off the Belgian coast". Churchill offered naval fire support for an army operation and French adopted the idea for the main effort of 1915. The army would advance between Dixmude and the sea while the navy provided bombardments and a surprise landing near Zeebrugge. The plan was cancelled by the British government in favour of the Gallipoli Campaign.

In early 1916 the idea of a coastal attack was revived and talks began between Sir Douglas Haig the new BEF commander-in-chief and Rear Admiral Reginald Bacon, commander of the Dover Patrol. Haig appointed Lieutenant-General Aylmer Hunter-Weston, who had commanded the 29th Division and then VIII Corps at Gallipoli, to work with Bacon on the plan. An offensive from Ypres and the landing operation, superseded an offensive on the coast. Bacon proposed to land 9,000 men from six monitors and 100 trawlers in Ostend harbour, with decoys towards Zeebrugge and Middelkirke, as a coastal assault began from Nieuwpoort. Hunter-Weston rejected the plan because the front was too narrow. Ostend harbour was in range of German heavy guns and the harbour exits were easy to block. Bacon began work on a new plan for a landing near Middelkirke, which incorporated Hunter-Weston's recommendations and Haig's desire for tanks to be used in the landings.

The Battle of the Somme in 1916 forced Haig to postpone an offensive in Flanders until 1917 and the coastal attack depended on retaining the Yser bridgehead, because the river was deep, tidal and 100–200 yd (91–183 m) wide. Lieutenant-Colonel Norman MacMullen (GSO I) and a small planning group formed in January 1917 at General Headquarters (GHQ), recommended that the operation should not begin until a general advance from Ypres had reached Roulers, which Haig accepted. A coastal offensive was to be conducted if one of three conditions were met, that the offensive at Ypres had prompted a collapse in the German defence, if the Germans took troops from the coast to replace losses in a long battle in the Ypres area or if the Allied advance at Ypres had reached Passchendaele ridge and the Fifth Army was advancing on Roulers (now Roeselare) and Thourout (now Torhout).

=== Tactics ===
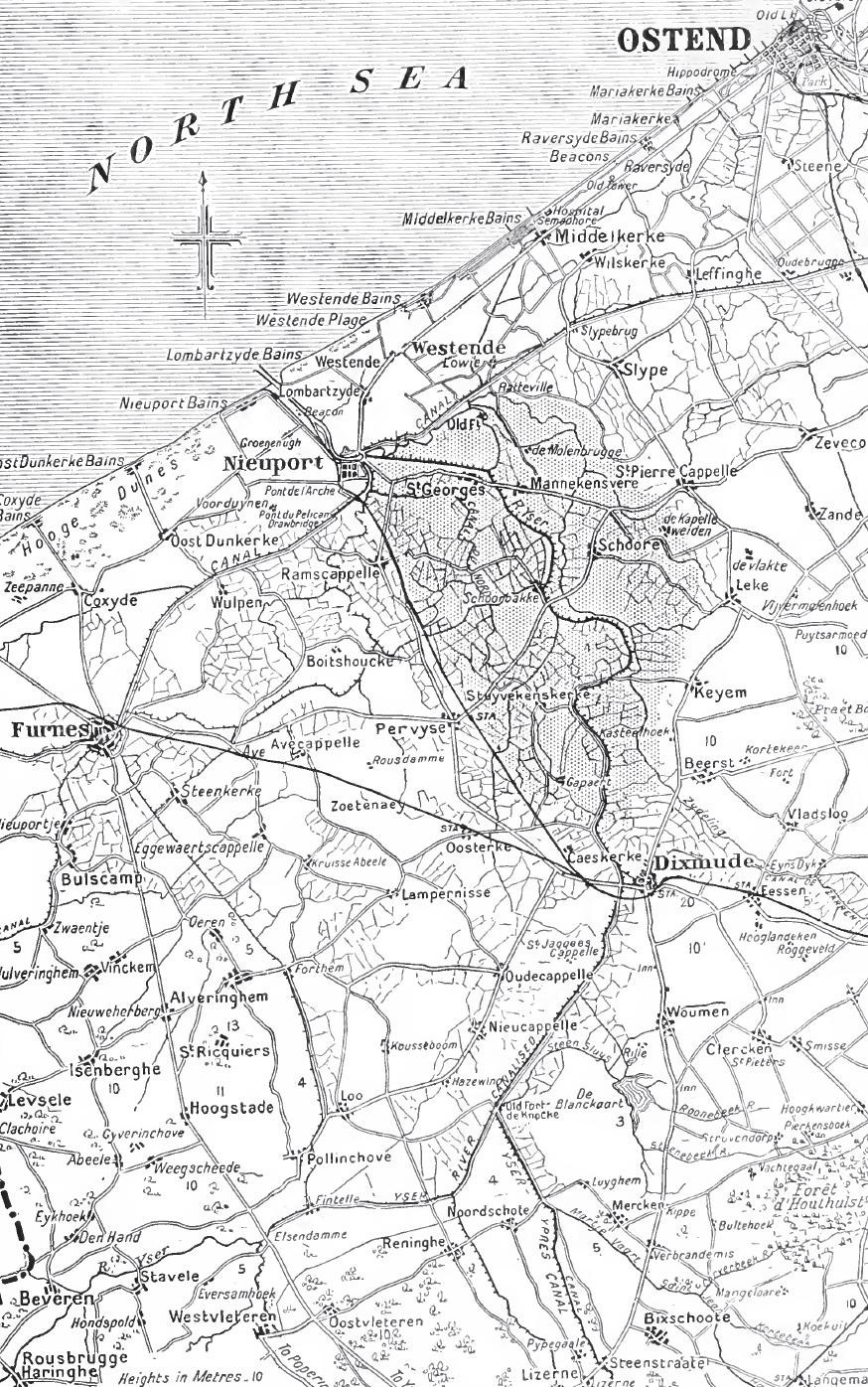
Yser inundations, 1914–1918

To land troops swiftly, retaining the benefit of surprise, Bacon designed flat-bottomed craft which could land on beaches. The pontoons were 550 ft × 32 ft (167.6 m × 9.8 m), specially-built and lashed between pairs of monitors. Men, guns, wagons, ambulances, boxcars, motor cars, handcarts, bicycles, Stokes mortar carts and sidecars, plus two male tanks and one female tank, were to be embarked on each monitor. HMS General Wolfe and the other monitors would push the pontoons up the beach, the tanks would drive off, pulling sledges full of equipment, climb the sea-walls (an incline of about 30°), surmount a large projecting coping-stone at the top and then haul the rest of their load over the wall.

The Belgian architect who had designed the wall was a refugee in France and supplied his drawings. A replica was built at Merlimont and a detachment of tanks under Major Bingham rehearsed on it, using "shoes" on the tank tracks and special detachable steel ramps carried on the tanks, until they could climb the wall. In experiments on the Thames Estuary, the pontoons performed exceptionally well, riding out very bad weather and being easier to manoeuvre than expected, leading to hopes that they could be used again after the initial assault to land reinforcements. Night landings were also practised, with wire stretched between buoys to guide the pontoons to within 100 yd (91 m) of their landing place.

After Unternehmen Strandfest (Operation Beach Party), a German spoiling attack, 52 Squadron Royal Flying Corps (RFC) and the Fourth Balloon Wing, developed III Wing methods of co-operation during artillery observation, by having balloon observers direct preliminary ranging until shells were landing close to a target, then handing over to the aeroplane observer for the final corrections of aim. When the air observer had ranged the guns, the balloon observer took over again. The new method was economical on aircrew and had the advantage of telephone communication between the ground and the balloon, since aircraft wireless could only transmit.

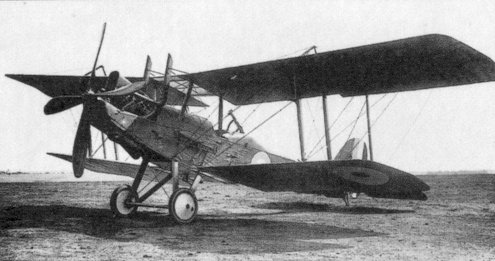
Example of a Royal Aircraft Factory R.E.8 similar to the ones flown by 52 Squadron

Air co-operation with Royal Engineer sound ranging was also practised. A line of microphones was connected to a receiving station further back and activated by a forward observer. Air observers routinely sent "NF" by wireless and a position report when German batteries were seen to be firing; German shelling often cut off the ground observer from contact with the rear and the sound-ranging station was equipped with a wireless receiver and used receipt of "NF", to activate the sound ranging apparatus. The device could also be used to identify the position of German artillery when the air observer was unable accurately to indicate the position of the guns; balloon observers also assisted the ranging section by reporting gun flashes.

== Prelude ==
=== British preparations ===
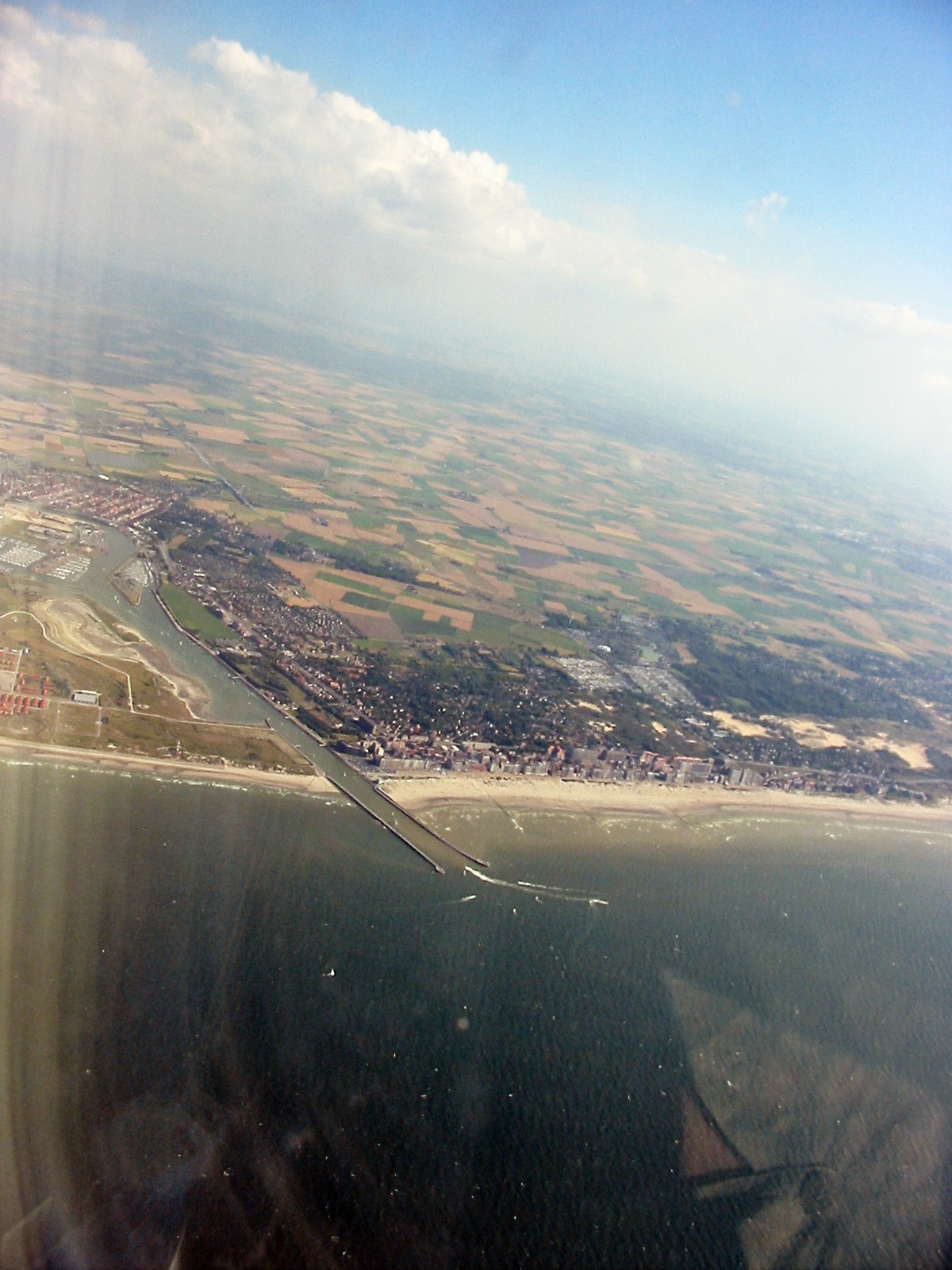
Mouth of the Yser river

The Third (Corps) Wing of IV Brigade RFC moved north with XV Corps (Lieutenant-General Sir John Du Cane) in June and was temporarily made an independent mixed command, responsible for army co-operation and defence when the line was taken over from the French. (Note: From 30 January 1916, each British army had a Royal Flying Corps brigade attached, which was divided into wings, the "corps wing" with squadrons responsible for close reconnaissance, photography and artillery observation on the front of each army corps and an "army wing" which by 1917 conducted long-range reconnaissance and bombing, using the aircraft types with the highest performance.) By 10 July the Fourteenth (Army) Wing of IV Brigade had arrived, the brigade taking responsibility for reconnaissance in the area Keyem (now Keiem), Ichtergem, Bruges, Blankenberghe (now Blankenberge), Oost and Dunkirk Bains until 13 July, then Keyem, Oostcamp, Zeebrugge, Oost and Dunkirk Bains, while Royal Naval Air Service (RNAS) units reconnoitred as required. The offensive patrol front was from Stuyvekenskerke (now Stuivekenskerke) to Oost and Dunkirk Bains and by RNAS aircraft north of Nieuwpoort to 3 mi (4.8 km) west of Dunkirk. RNAS aircraft conducted night-bombing sorties in the area Dixmude, Thourout, Ghent, Retranchement and Nieuwpoort Bains. The 9th (Headquarters) Wing acted as a mobile reserve on the Flanders front.

When XV Corps took over from the 29th Division and the 133rd Division of the XXXVI Corps (36 Corps d'Armée) on the coast on 20 June. The British artillery was held back as the French would only allow their infantry to be covered by French guns. The French position had three defensive areas, St Georges on the right (inland) side, almost surrounded by water, at the junction with the Belgian army (which held the line for 13 mi (21 km) southwards to Nordschoote), the Lombartzyde area (now Lombardsijde) in the centre, with inundations on either side and Nieuwpoort Bains on the left to the coast, either side of the Geleide Brook. The sectors were linked across the inundations by bridges and isolated from the rear by the Yser and Dunkirk canals, crossed by floating-barrel bridges called Richmond, Kew and Mortlake near Nieuwpoort Bains and Barnes, Putney and Vauxhall bridges near Nieuwpoort. A permanent roadway crossed lock gates east of Nieuwpoort and another bridge named Crowder was built later near Nieuwpoort. In the centre of the front was a 2,000 yd (1.1 mi; 1.8 km) stretch with no crossing over the Yser; no man's land was 65–80 yd (59–73 m) wide. There was very little cover for artillery in the area and machine-guns were vulnerable to stoppages from wind-blown sand.

The 1st Division (Major-General Peter Strickland) and the 32nd Division (Major-General Cameron Shute) took over and had only limited artillery support for several days, while the British artillery completed the relief. Du Cane ordered that the positions were to be held at all costs but the main French defences had been built in the south bank,the bridgehead, 800 yd (730 m) deep from St Georges to the coast, being held as an outpost. Three breastworks gave some protection from artillery-fire and there were no underground shelters for reserves. Tunnellers began work on dugouts in the sand dunes but few had been completed by early July. A defence plan for the bridgehead was issued on 28 June, relying mainly on artillery but of 583 guns in the Fourth Army, only 176 had arrived by 8 July, the remainder being with the First and Second armies, in support of operations towards Lens and Lille, due to arrive by 15 July. On the night of 6/7 July, German aircraft bombed the main British aerodrome at Bray-Dunes near Dunkirk, causing nine casualties and damage to twelve aircraft. Reconnaissance flights by IV Brigade RFC and the RNAS aircraft were hampered from 7 to 9 July by ground mist and clouds down to 900 ft (270 m). Vague reports of increased activity behind the German front had been received but a special flight early on 8 July found nothing, despite the unusual amount of movement, as the Germans prepared to attack; on 9 July all aircraft were grounded by bad weather.

=== British plan ===
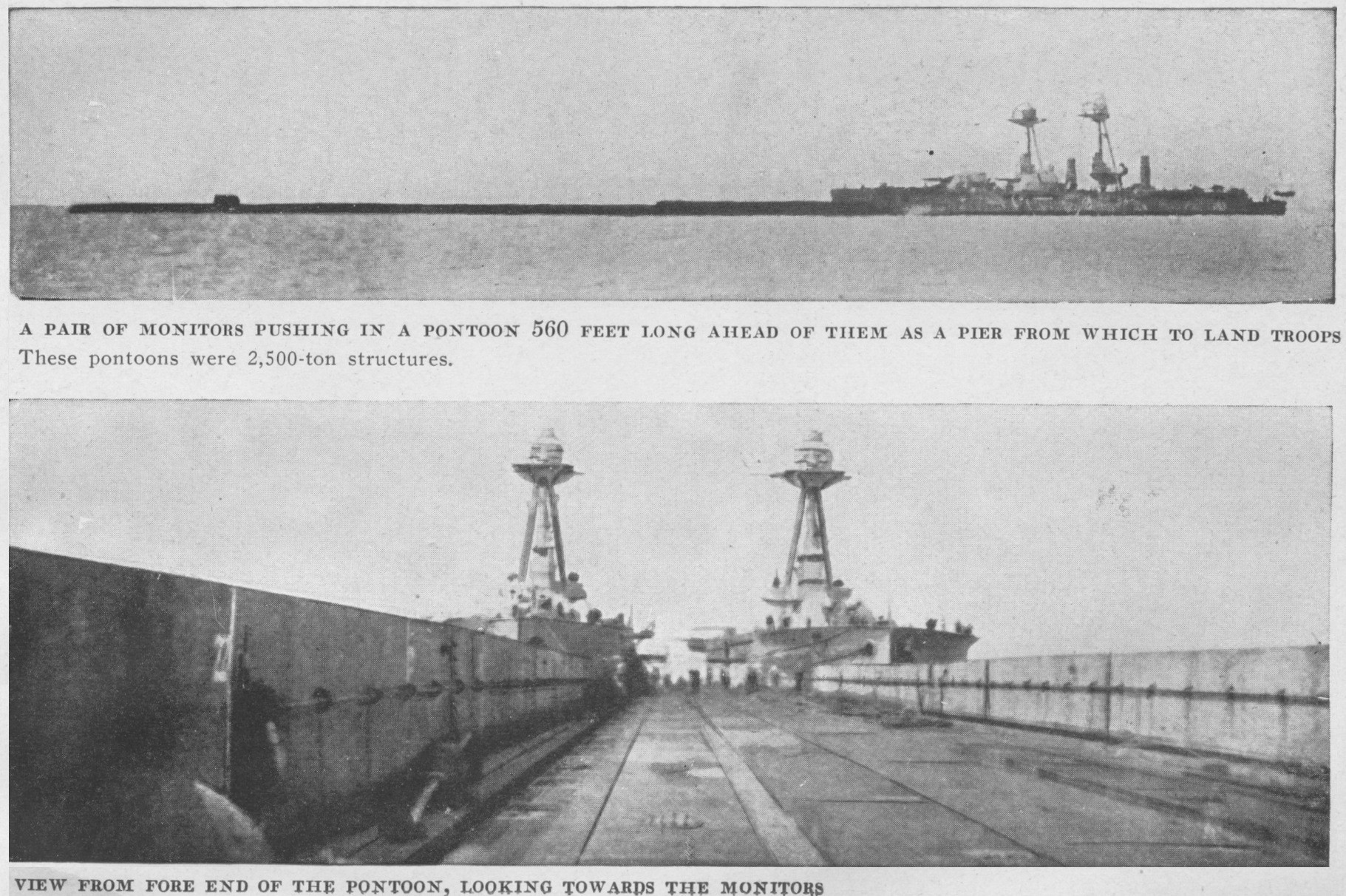
Pontoon under way

A landing operation would begin at dawn under the command of Rear-Admiral Bacon and an army division in three parties of about 4,500 men each, would disembark on the beaches near Middelkirke, covered by a naval bombardment and a smoke screen generated by eighty small vessels. Trawlers would carry telephone cable ashore and tanks would disembark from the landing pontoons and climb the sea-wall to cover the infantry landing. The infantry would have four 13-pounder guns and two light howitzers and each wing of the landing had a motor machine-gun battery. For mobility, each landing party had more than 200 bicycles and three motorbikes. Three landing sites were chosen, at Westende Bains, 1 mi (1.6 km) behind the German second line; another site 0.75 mi (1.21 km) beyond the German third line and a third landing 1.75 mi (2.82 km) beyond that at Middelkirke Bains, to cut off the line of retreat of the German artillery around Westende, turn the German second and third positions and advance inland as far as possible.

The northern landing brigade was to send a flying column with specialist engineers to Raversyde, to destroy the German artillery battery there and then advance east or south-east, to threaten the German withdrawal route to the south and isolate Ostend. All the landing forces were to rush inland towards Leffinghe and Slype, occupying bridges over the Plasschendaele canal and road junctions nearby. Extra transport would move with the two XV Corps divisions advancing from Nieuwpoort. XV Corps would break out of the Nieuwpoort bridgehead between St Georges and the coast, with a barrage from 300 guns with naval guns in support over a 3,500 yd (2.0 mi; 3.2 km) front. A 1,000 yd (910 m) advance would be followed by a one-hour pause. Four similar advances over six hours would take the land attack to Middelkirke, where it would link with the landing force, keeping three divisions in reserve. The German defence was expected to have two brigades in the first two defence lines as the attack began. The plan was approved by Haig on 18 June and the 1st Division was chosen to make the coastal landing. (Note: British units: Fourth Army, XV Corps, 1st Division, 32nd Division, 33rd Division, 49th Division, 66th Division, IV Brigade Royal Flying Corps, 4 (Naval Wing) Royal Naval Air Service (approximately 200 aircraft), Dover Patrol. German units: 4th Army, Guards Corps, Marine-Korps-Flandern, 3rd Marine Division, 199th Division.)

=== German preparations ===
On 19 June a patrol from the 3rd Marine Division captured eleven soldiers of the British 32nd Division which, with increased artillery and air activity, was taken by Admiral von Schröder the commander of Gruppe Nord and Marine Korps Flandern, as a sign that the British contemplated a coastal operation. (Note: In 1941, Charles Bean, the Australian official historian, wrote that the Germans decided on a spoiling attack on the coast to strengthen a weak spot, because of the offensive being prepared by the Allies at Ypres, rather than being prompted by the discovery of British troops on the coast.) Unternehmen Strandfest (Operation Beach Party) a spoiling attack by the reinforced 3rd Marine Division with the 199th Division in reserve, was planned to capture ground east of the Yser, from Lombartzijde creek to the sea, led by the Guard Corps commander General Ferdinand von Quast, who took over Gruppe Nord on 30 June. Parts of the 3rd Marine Division were withdrawn during the second half of June to rehearse an attack by frontal assault, with covering fire from eleven torpedo boats off the coast; artillery reinforcements with 300,000 rounds of ammunition were moved to the coast. (Note: Thirty field batteries, twelve light howitzer batteries, sixteen heavy howitzer batteries, ten mortar batteries, seven siege batteries and three long-range naval guns.)

==== Batterie Pommern ====
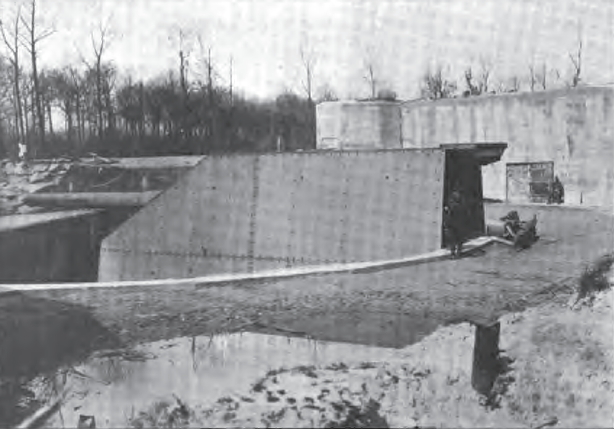
38 cm Lange Max at Koekelare (Leugenboom) the largest gun in the world in 1917

In June 1917 Krupp completed the construction of Batterie Pommern at Koekelare with Langer Max, the biggest gun of the world, an adaptation of its 38 cm type. The gun played an important part in the German defence of Flanders and was used to bombard Dunkirk 31 mi (50 km) distant, to stop the unloading of supplies and was sometimes used for diversionary operations. The gun fired its first shell at Dunkirk on 27 June; during the Third Battle of Ypres the gun was also used to shell Ypres.

=== Unternehmen Strandfest ===
Unternehmen Strandfest (Operation Beach Party, also the Battle of the Dunes) began with a German artillery bombardment on 6 July, though not of an intensity sufficient to suggest an attack. The dawn of 9 July was wet and stormy; Strandfest was postponed for 24 hours at 6:10 a.m., about two hours before zero hour. The next day was overcast, with a strong wind and the bombardment increased at 5:30 a.m. The British floating bridges near the coast were destroyed and near Nieuwpoort, only one bridge and the lock-bridge remained intact. By 10:15 a.m., telephone and wireless contact with the British front was lost. The shelling was heaviest from the Geleide Brook to the coast, held by the 2nd Brigade of the 1st Division. By 11:00 a.m., the two British battalions had been cut off. Before noon all the German artillery and mortars began firing, except for twenty-minute periods at 2:00 p.m., 4:00 p.m. and 7:00 p.m. for observation. The breastworks on the British side were only 7 ft (2.1 m) high and 3 ft (0.91 m) thick and collapsed immediately. Sand clogged the defenders' small-arms and the Germans used Yellow Cross (mustard gas) and Blue Cross gas shells for the first time, mainly for counter-battery fire, which reduced the British artillery to a "feeble" reply.

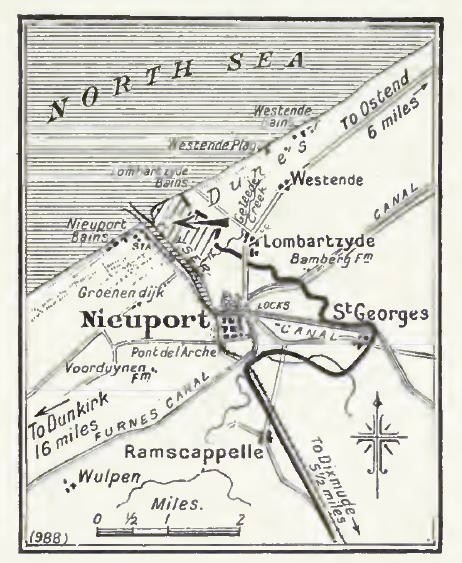
German spoiling attack on the Yser, 10 July 1917

German aircraft made low-altitude strafing attacks and by late afternoon, the British troops on the west bank of the Yser were pinned down. The British artillery defence plan was implemented, with one-hour bombardments of German trench lines at 9:30 a.m., 11:25 a.m. and 2:10 p.m., which were ineffective against German concrete shelters. The German artillery had a 3:1 advantage in numbers and to conceal their presence, many British guns had not registered, only 153 coming into action. At 8:00 p.m., Marine regiments 1 and 2 of the 3rd Marine Division, with the 199th Division in support, attacked on a front of 2,000 yd (1.1 mi; 1.8 km) between Lombartzyde and the sea, with an outflanking attack along the sea shore.

The main attack advanced in five waves, close behind a creeping barrage. Groups of the specialist Marine Korps Sturmabteilung (assault detachment) made up the first wave and advanced to the third breastwork, overwhelmed the defenders and moved forward to the Yser bank after a short pause. The second wave overran the British troops at the second breastwork and then dug in at the third breastwork; the third wave advanced to the Yser bank to reinforce the first wave and set up machine-gun nests. The fourth wave carried engineer stores for consolidation and moppers-up with flame-throwers dealt with the British survivors in the first breastwork, then advanced to the third breastwork, as the fifth wave took over the second breastwork.

In twenty minutes German troops reached the river bank and isolated the British parties still resisting, 70–80 per cent having already been killed or wounded by the artillery bombardment,

...the enemy was using a new gas shell freely. Shell bursts like a small H.E. Gas makes you sneeze and run at the nose and eyes. Smell is like cayenne pepper. This actually was the "Blue-Cross" shell, a different type from the mustard ("Yellow-Cross") shell. Both new shells were used in this action.

— Charles Bean Australian official historian

and at 8:30 a.m., British observers on the far bank saw troops holding out near the Northamptonshire battalion headquarters. A counter-attack was attempted by troops of the Rifle Corps battalion before the troops opposite were overrun. By 8:45 a.m. the captured position was consolidated and some of the blocked British dugouts were excavated by the Germans to rescue the occupants. All of the British garrison in the bridgehead was lost and more than 1,284 prisoners were taken; about forty British troops managed to swim the Yser where they were caught in the German bombardment. German casualties were about 700 men. Overnight 64 men from the two infantry battalions and four from the 2nd Australian Tunnelling Company swam the river, having hid in tunnels until dark. Further inland in the 32nd Division area from the Geleide Brook to St. Georges, the 97th Brigade was attacked. The German advance stopped at the second breastwork, which had been made the objective as the ground behind could be easily flooded; a counter-attack overnight by the garrison and some reinforcements regained the position, except for 500 yd (460 m) near Geleide Brook. On 10 July, German smoke-screens, low cloud and fighter attacks made air observation very difficult but some new German battery positions were detected. The front line was plotted from the air late on 10 July and early on 11 July. An extra flight was transferred to 52 Squadron for artillery observation of the great concentration of German guns but when British aircraft began to direct artillery-fire, they found that the Germans had put smoke generators around the main batteries to conceal them.

== Aftermath ==
=== Analysis ===
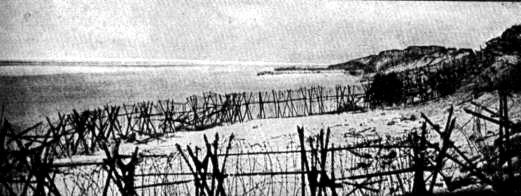
Nieuwepoort, the north end of the Western Front

Admiral Roger Keyes thought that the operation was doomed to fail and Admiral John Jellicoe expected a great success. Despite the demands of the battles at Ypres, Haig kept XV Corps on the coast throughout, ready to exploit a general withdrawal by the 4th Army. Haig resisted suggestions to launch the operation independently, wanting it to be synchronised with the advance on Roulers, which loomed in early October but did not occur until a year later. In 1936, J. F. C. Fuller, a former staff officer of the Heavy Branch Machine Gun Corps, called the scheme "a crack-brained one, a kind of mechanical Gallipoli affair". When in the area in 1933, Fuller had found that the sea-walls were partially covered in a fine green seaweed, which the tanks might not have been able to scale.

In 1996, Robin Prior and Trevor Wilson wrote that the amphibious part of the plan was extremely risky, given the slow speed of the monitors and the pontoons having no armour. A German mobile force was on hand as a precaution and the area could be flooded. In 1997, Andrew Wiest called the plan an imaginative way to return to a war of movement, foreshadowing the amphibious warfare of the Second World War and a credit to Haig but that his refusal to agree to a landing independent of events at Ypres, showed that he had overestimated the possibility of a German collapse. In 2008, J. P. Harris wrote that the German spoiling attack demonstrated that the decline of the German armies in France had been exaggerated and that the War Cabinet neglected to question Haig more rigorously, after he had assured them that the reverse was due to local factors.

=== Subsequent operations ===
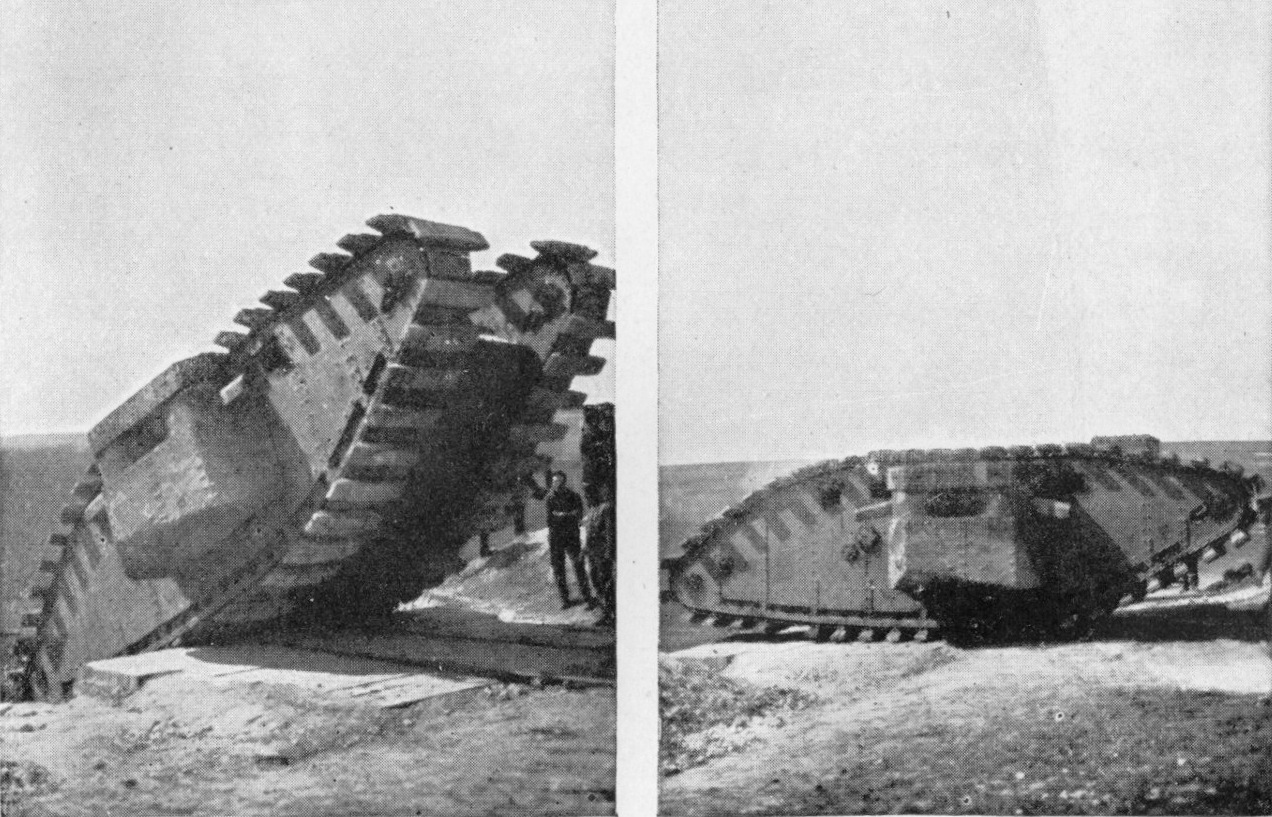
Climbing tank with track spuds, tilts forward atop the sea-wall.

On 11 July Rawlinson ordered that lost ground be recovered by outflanking the new German line along the canal in the Dunes sector. Du Cane noted that instant counter-attacks made on local initiative usually succeeded, while those ordered later by higher authority were too late to exploit disorganisation among the attackers; adequate preparation and a methodical attack was necessary. The remainder of the bridgehead was constricted, the German artillery reinforcements were still present and after a successful counter-attack, British troops would be vulnerable to another German operation.

Du Cane wanted to wait until the rest of the British artillery arrived and the main offensive at Ypres had begun. Rawlinson accepted Du Cane's views and counter-attacks planned for 12 July by the 32nd Division were cancelled. The 33rd Division was moved to the coast in August and took over from Nieuwpoort to Lombartsyde, spending three weeks in the line, under night bombing and gas shelling. Two of the 33rd Division battalions were kilted Scottish and suffered severely from mustard gas burns, until equipped with undergarments.

To keep British preparations secret, crews from 52 Squadron RFC and the 1st Division were segregated on 16 July, at Le Clipon, a camp enclosed by barbed wire and a story was put about that it was in quarantine. The 1st Division artillery was reduced to three 18-pounder batteries and nine tanks, two cyclist battalions, a motor machine-gun battery and a machine-gun company. It was planned to create three brigade columns, each of which would embark on two monitors, 2,500 men being carried by the pontoon lashed between the monitors. Special fighter patrols were arranged to keep German reconnaissance aircraft away from training areas and arrangements were made for early warning of German aircraft approaching Dunkirk, fighters standing by to intercept them.

Operation Hush was revised to incorporate the cancelled counter-attack plan; the attack on Lombartzyde would begin from the ground still held north of the Yser, by the 66th (2nd East Lancashire) Division and a flank attack shortly after from the Geleide Brook to the coast. The attack up the coast and the landings were left unchanged. Haig accepted the plan on 18 July, to go ahead on 8 August (the operation was postponed several times before it was cancelled). On 24 August, the 33rd Division raided German outposts on the Geleide Brook, killed "many" Germans and took nine prisoners, for a loss of one killed and sixteen wounded. Next day the Germans retaliated by recapturing the easternmost post and on 26 August, fired fifteen super-heavy shells into Nieuwpoort, demolishing the 19th Brigade headquarters. The division was withdrawn from the coastal sector in early September.

The presence of two British divisions in the coastal sector convinced the German commanders that the danger of a British coastal offensive remained. The best tidal conditions for a landing would occur again on 18 August and the Fifth Army made its second general attack at Ypres on 16 August at the Battle of Langemarck, partly to meet the postponed landing date but failed to advance far in the most vital sector, leading to another postponement to 6 September. At a meeting on 22 August, Haig, Rawlinson and Bacon discussed three alternatives, another postponement of the coastal operation, conducting the operation independently or moving the divisions from XV Corps to the Fifth Army.

Rawlinson favoured an independent operation, which he thought would get as far as Middelkirke, bringing Ostend into artillery-range, which would make the Germans counter-attack, despite the pressure being exerted on them at Ypres. Bacon wanted the area between Westende and Middelkirke to be occupied so that 15-inch naval guns would be within range of Bruges 31,000 yd (18 mi; 28 km) away and Zeebrugge 34,000 yd (19 mi; 31 km) distant. The Zeebrugge–Bruges canal would also be in range and its locks could be destroyed. Haig rejected the proposal and the September operation was postponed, this time for a night landing under a full moon in the first week of October, unless the situation at Ypres changed sooner.

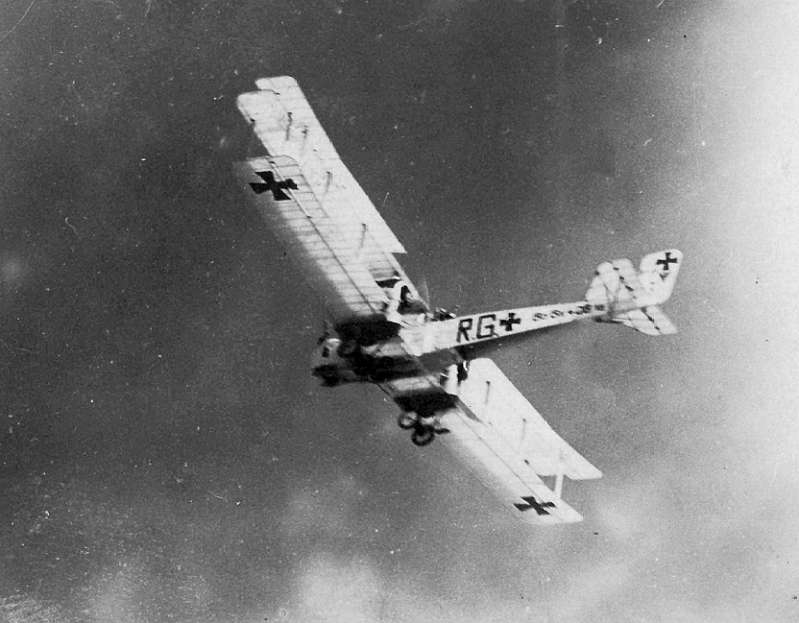
Example of a Gotha RG bomber

In September, Rawlinson and Bacon became pessimistic and Haig postponed the operation again but told them to be ready for the second week of October. The 42nd (East Lancashire) Division moved from Ypres, relieved the 66th (2nd East Lancashire) Division in late September and found that the area was under frequent German artillery-fire, bombing and gas attacks. The coastal sector was also beneath the flight path of German Gotha bombers attacking Dunkirk, which was attacked on twenty-three nights in September. Hopes rose after the Battle of Broodseinde (4 October) and again after the Battle of Poelcappelle (9 October), although the coastal operation could not start before the end of the month.

After the First Battle of Passchendaele (12 October), Hush was cancelled; on 14 October, Rawlinson wrote, "...things have not been running at all smoothly – it is now clear that we shall do nothing on the coast here". The 1st Division left the camp at Le Clipon on 21 October and the rest of the Fourth Army followed on 3 November. On 23 April 1918, the Dover Patrol conducted the Zeebrugge Raid and sank block ships in the canal entrance to stop U-boats leaving port. The Belgian Army and the British Second Army began the Fifth Battle of Ypres on 28 September 1918 and on 17 October, Ostend was captured.

== See also ==
- Dover Patrol
- Zeebrugge Raid
- First Ostend Raid
- Second Ostend Raid
