= Neston Diggle =

Royal Navy officer

Captain Neston William Diggle, CMG (7 January 1881 – 17 December 1963) was a Royal Navy officer during the First World War who was Naval attaché in Rome 1919–1922.

Diggle was born in 1880, the son of Wadham Neston Diggle who had previously been a Lieutenant in the Royal Navy and his first wife, Emma Cookson. Diggle senior subsequently married on 5 April 1883 Lily Julia Noble (d. 25 January 1942).

He entered the Royal Navy, training like all other naval cadets at Britannia, and was on 8 June 1897 appointed to the battleship HMS Royal Sovereign as a Midshipman. Diggle was soon after appointed to the battleship HMS Mars, when he was selected to travel with a procession of 12 pdr guns in Queen Victoria's Diamond Jubilee parade through London.

He was promoted to Lieutenant on 15 July 1901, and served on board the Cormorant at Gibraltar from 1901 to 1902. In September 1902 he was posted to the protected cruiser HMS Isis, based at Dartmouth.

Following service in the first world war, Diggle was British Naval attaché in Rome from July 1919 until 1922.

In addition to the CMG, Diggle was awarded the 1914 Star, the World War I British War Medal, the World War I Victory Medal, the Queen Victoria Diamond Jubilee Medal, Officer of the French Legion of Honour, Officer of the Order of the Crown (Belgium), the Croix de guerre 1914-1918 (France) with palm, and the Croix de guerre (Belgium) with palm.

After his retirement from the Royal Navy, Diggle lived in the village of Tellisford, Somerset and he became a director of the investment company the Sons of Gwalia Limited.

== Commands ==
- HMS Hussar, torpedo gunboat.
- HMS General Wolfe, monitor.
