= Angus Diggle =

British solicitor (1956–2019)

Angus Diggle (1956 – 23 November 2019) was a disgraced British former solicitor, educated at Bolton School, Shrewsbury and Bristol University, who was convicted of attempted rape in a case that was widely reported at the time.

== Notoriety ==
Diggle first came to public notice when he was sentenced to three years in prison for the attempted rape of a woman after a Highland Ball at the Grosvenor House Hotel in Park Lane, Mayfair, London in 1993. He was found by the woman's friends wearing only his spectacles, frilly cuffs and a luminous condom, and reportedly told the police: "I spent £200 on her. Why can't I do what I did to her?" Many were surprised at the severity of the sentence, including the victim herself, and questions were raised in the House of Lords about Diggle's guilt.

His sentence was later reduced to two years on appeal and he was freed after serving 12 months after gaining full remission for good behaviour. After the outcome of the rape trial was known, it was found out that Diggle had recently been sacked from his job as a conveyancing solicitor with North Western Regional Health Authority, after he had been fined £50 for intimidating a 20-year-old woman on a train.

== More trouble with the law ==
=== 1997 ===
In 1997, Diggle put his own name forward as one of 150 possible candidates for the then vacant Parliamentary seat of Kensington and Chelsea. Conservative officials there were at the time keen to avoid embarrassment after then sitting MP Sir Nicholas Scott was de-selected for being found face down in the gutter in a Bournemouth Street. Diggle was not selected; he was not included even on a "long-list."

=== 1998 ===
In 1998, Diggle was struck off as a Solicitor after getting drunk and abusive to two police officers in the red-light area of Bolton during a Sunday afternoon drinking binge. He is reported as having said to the police, "Do you know who I am? I'm a famous person."

=== 2010 ===
In November 2010 Diggle was given a two-year antisocial behaviour order banning him from every bar and club in his hometown of Bolton; he was also told to stay away from rail services and other premises whilst intoxicated. If he is caught breaking the order he could face five years in prison. Earlier in 2010, Diggle was caught urinating in the street while being seen to stagger through the red-light district of Bolton; he later swore at a police officer when he was arrested. Only a month after the urinating incident, Diggle was arrested again after drunkenly hurling racist verbal abuse at an Afro-Caribbean passenger at a railway station. He had been reported by a female customer services operator who had been left "shocked and embarrassed" when Diggle apparently called the passenger a "black bastard".

=== 2011 ===
In November 2011, Diggle was convicted of common assault (by battery) after a trial at Bolton Magistrates Court. The Court was told that on 16 August 2011 Diggle lunged at an officer of G4S a security firm, Andrew Brocklehurst, who was at Diggle's house to install equipment.

One of Diggle's neighbours reportedly said, "Angus used to be charming but the scandal left him ruined. He's obviously bitter."

=== 2012 ===
On 13 September 2012 Diggle was charged before Bolton Magistrates Court with using, "Threatening, abusive or insulting words or disorderly behaviour within hearing or sight of a person likely to be caused harassment, alarm of distress." The matter was adjourned until 12 October.

== Aftermath ==
"Since his various brushes with the law, Diggle found it hard to obtain employment and took to writing melancholy and bizarre posts on Twitter."

An announcement of Diggle's death appeared in the Bolton News on 17 December 2019 revealing he died in November.
