= Blue Cross (chemical warfare) =

German World War I chemical agent

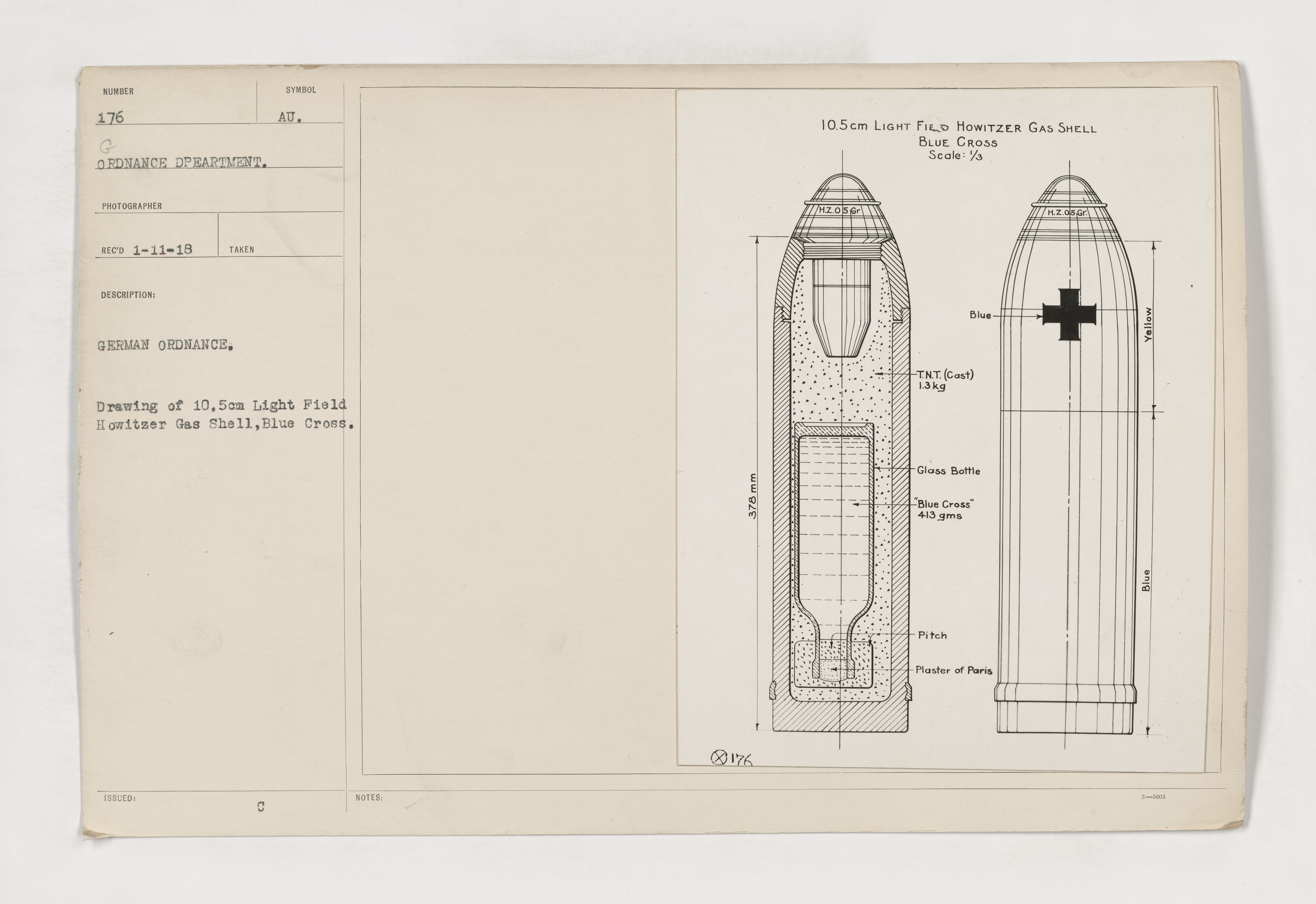
A diagram of combined HE-chemical shell for 10.5 cm howitzers with Blue Cross agent

Blue Cross (German: Blaukreuz) is a German World War I chemical warfare agent consisting of diphenylchloroarsine (DA, Clark I), diphenylcyanoarsine (CDA, Clark II), ethyldichloroarsine (Dick), and/or methyldichloroarsine (Methyldick). Clark I and Clark II were the main agents used.

Clark I was initially used with Green Cross munitions; however for the first time it was used as a standalone agent in the night from July 10 to July 11, 1917, at Nieuwpoort, Belgium, during Operation Strandfest. The artillery munition contained many glass spheres closed with a cork and sealed with the explosive trinitrotoluene (TNT). N-ethylcarbazole was later added. Depending on the caliber, the munition contained 7–120 kg (15–265 lb) of the agent.

"Blue Cross" is also a generic World War I German marking for artillery shells with chemical payload affecting the upper respiratory tract.

== See also ==
- Green Cross (chemical warfare)
- Yellow Cross (chemical warfare)
- White Cross (chemical warfare)
- Lewisite
