= Triphosgene =

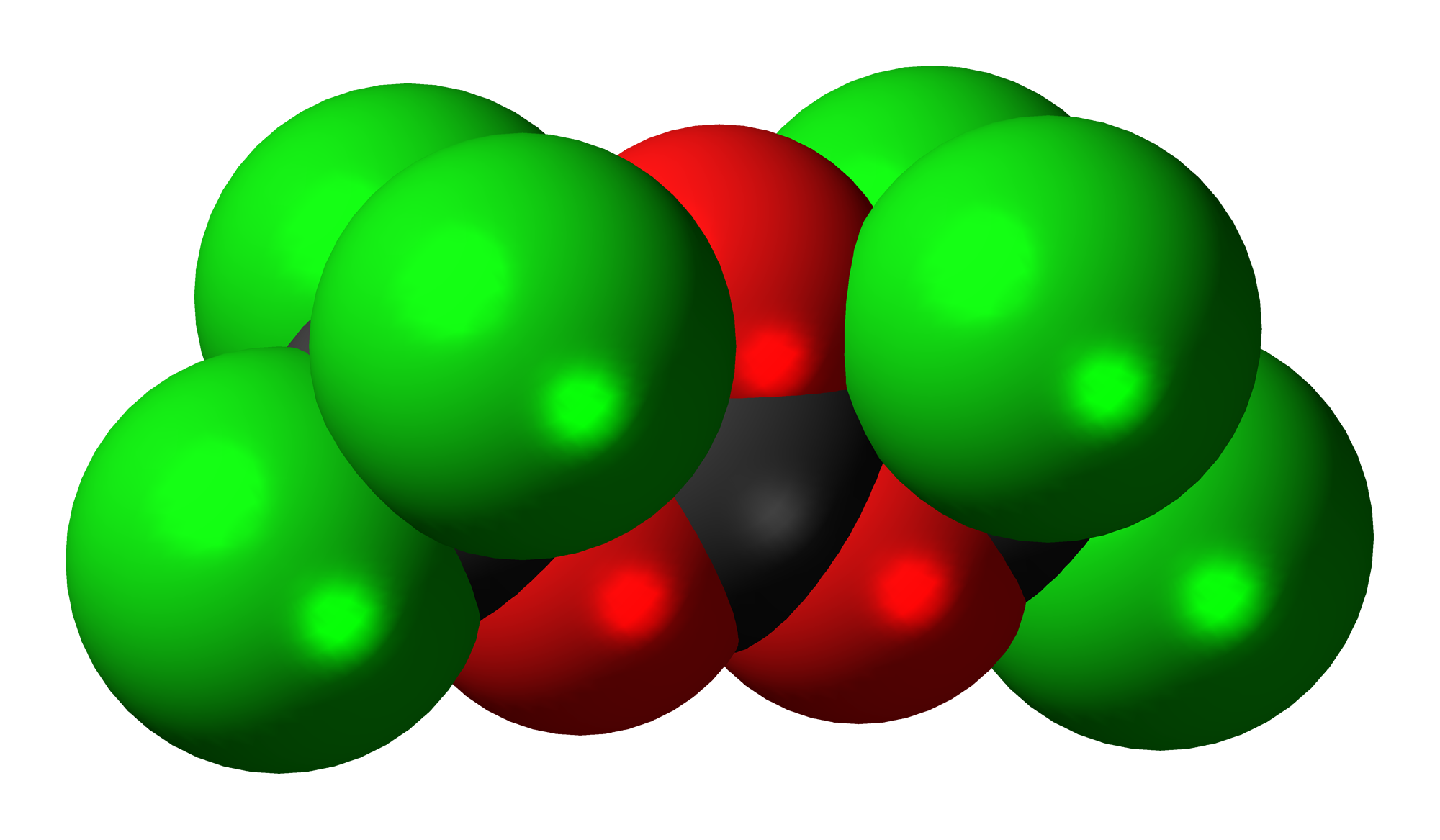

Names
- Preferred IUPAC name Bis(trichloromethyl) carbonate
- Other names BTC

Identifiers
CAS Number	32315-10-9
3D model (JSmol)	Interactive image
ChemSpider	85216
ECHA InfoCard	100.046.336
PubChem CID	94429
UNII	2C0677Q3B2
CompTox Dashboard (EPA)	DTXSID00865631
- InChI: InChI=1S/C3Cl6O3/c4-2(5,6)11-1(10)12-3(7,8)9 Key: UCPYLLCMEDAXFR-UHFFFAOYSA-N; InChI=1/C3Cl6O3/c4-2(5,6)11-1(10)12-3(7,8)9 Key: UCPYLLCMEDAXFR-UHFFFAOYAA
- SMILES: ClC(Cl)(Cl)OC(=O)OC(Cl)(Cl)Cl

Properties
Chemical formula	C_{3}Cl_{6}O_{3}
Molar mass	296.748 g/mol
Appearance	white solid
Density	1.780 g/cm^{3}
Melting point	80 °C (176 °F; 353 K)
Boiling point	206 °C (403 °F; 479 K)
Solubility in water	Reacts
Solubility	*soluble in dichloromethane: soluble in THF; soluble in toluene

Hazards
- GHS labelling
Pictograms	(GHS06: Toxic) (GHS05: Corrosive)
Signal word	Danger
Hazard statements	H314, H330
Precautionary statements	P260, P280, P284, P305+P351+P338, P310
Safety data sheet (SDS)	SDS Triphosgene
- Except where otherwise noted, data are given for materials in their standard state (at 25 °C [77 °F], 100 kPa). verify (what is ?) Infobox references

Triphosgene (bis(trichloromethyl) carbonate (BTC)) is a chemical compound with the formula OC(OCCl_{3})_{2}. It is used as a solid substitute for phosgene, which is a gas and diphosgene, which is a liquid. Triphosgene is stable up to 200 °C. Triphosgene is used in a variety of halogenation reactions. Triphosgene is named this way because one equivalent of triphosgene behaves like three equivalents of phosgene. Triphosgene generates two equivalents of phosgene in situ, while the carbonate has the same reactivity as one equivalent of phosgene.

== Preparation ==
This compound is commercially available. It is prepared by exhaustive free radical chlorination of dimethyl carbonate:

CH_{3}OCO_{2}CH_{3} + 6 Cl_{2} → CCl_{3}OCO_{2}CCl_{3} + 6 HCl

Triphosgene can be easily recrystallized from hot hexanes.

== Uses ==
Triphosgene is used as a reagent in organic synthesis as a source of CO^{2+}. It behaves like phosgene, to which it cracks thermally:

OC(OCCl_{3})_{2} ⇌ 3 OCCl_{2}

Alcohols are converted to carbonates. Primary and secondary amines are converted to ureas and isocyanates.

Triphosgene has been used to synthesize chlorides. Alkyl chlorides are produced from alcohols upon treatment with a mixture of triphosgene and pyridine. Alkyl dichlorides and trichlorides can similarly be prepared. Vinyl chlorides are synthesized from 2-epoxyketone using triphosgene and DMF to form the Vilsmeier reagent in situ.

== Safety ==
The vapor pressure of Triphosgene is sufficiently high for it to reach concentrations that are considered toxicologically unsafe. While several properties of triphosgene are not yet readily available, it is known that it is very toxic if inhaled. Toxic gases (phosgene and hydrogen chloride) are emitted when it comes in contact with water. There is a lack of information and variability regarding the proper handling of triphosgene. It is assumed to have the same risks as phosgene.

== See also ==
- Phosgene
- Diphosgene
