= Yellow Cross (chemical warfare) =

German WWI mustard-gas based agent

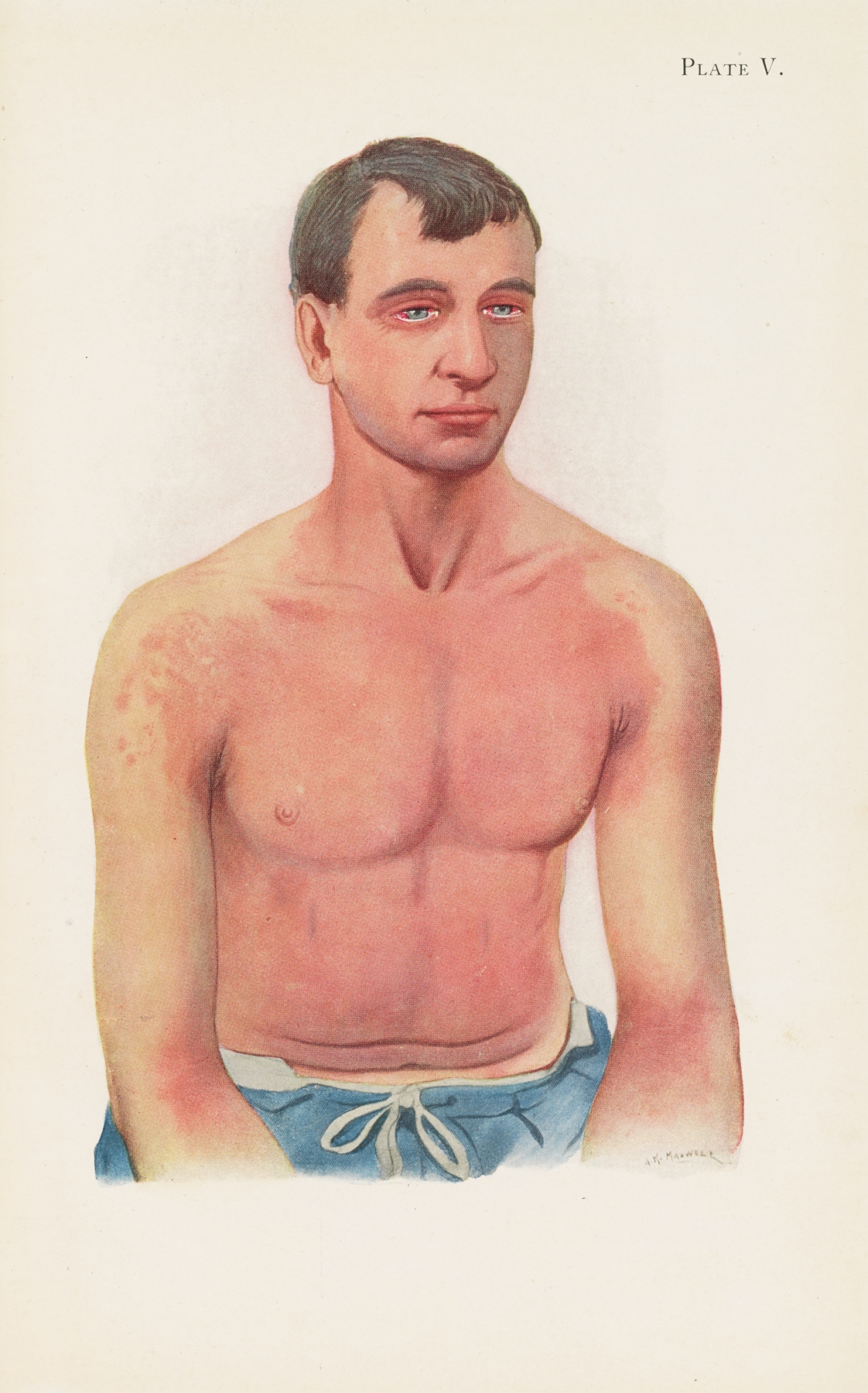
Plate V. Erythema of skin from general exposure to the vapour of Yellow Cross substance (1918) - illustration by A. Kirkpatrick Maxwell (Scottish, 1884-1975)

Yellow Cross (Gelbkreuz) is a German World War I chemical warfare agent usually based on mustard gas (also known as sulfur mustard, HS, Yperite, or Lost, among other names).

The original Gelbkreuz was a composition of 80–90% of sulfur mustard and 10–20% of tetrachloromethane or chlorobenzene as a solvent which lowered its viscosity and acted as an antifreeze, or, alternatively, 80% sulfur mustard, 10% bis(chloromethyl) ether, and 10% tetrachloromethane. A later formulation, Gelbkreuz 1, was a mixture of 40% ethyldichloroarsine, 40% ethyldibromoarsine, and 20% of bis(chloromethyl) ether. In some cases nitrobenzene, also highly toxic, was used to mask the material's characteristic odour. French "ypérite no.20" was a similar mixture of 80% sulfur mustard and 20% tetrachloromethane.

Yellow Cross is also a generic World War I German marking for artillery shells with chemical payload affecting the skin.

== See also ==
- Green Cross (chemical warfare)
- Blue Cross (chemical warfare)
- White Cross (chemical warfare)
