= Diphosgene =

- Diphosgene

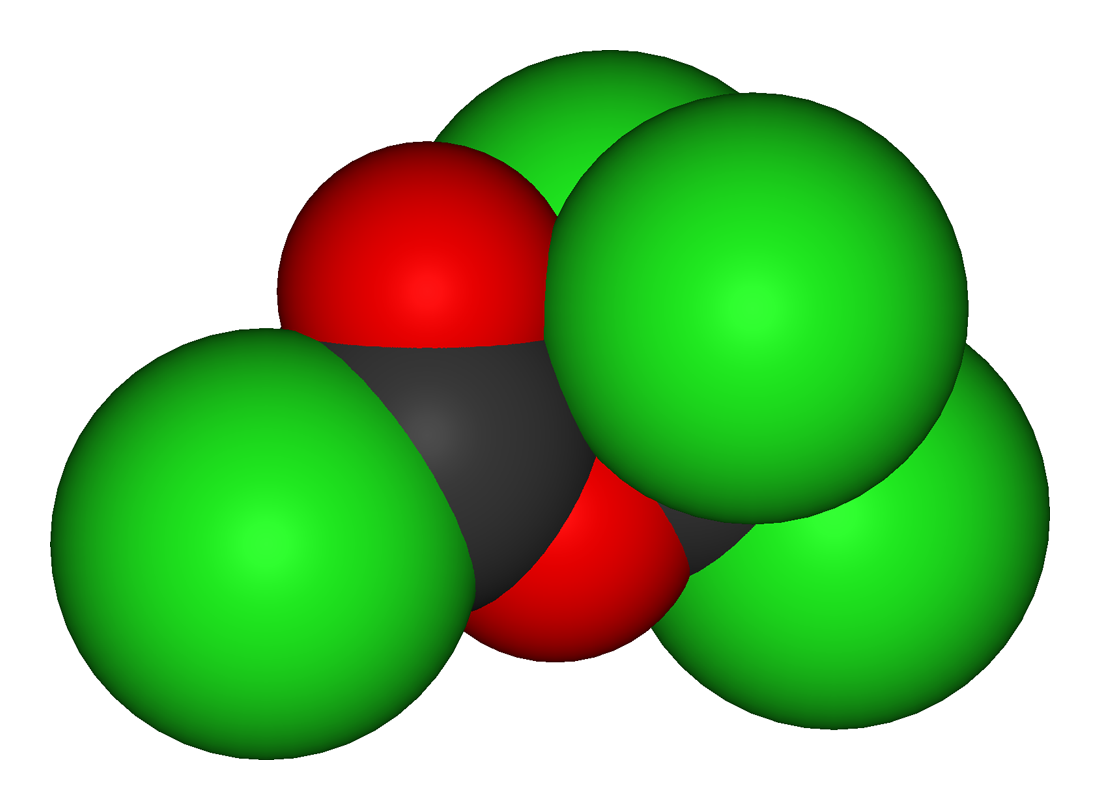
- Diphosgene

Names
- Preferred IUPAC name Trichloromethyl carbonochloridate
- Other names Trichloromethyl chloroformate, surpalite

Identifiers
CAS Number	503-38-8
3D model (JSmol)	Interactive image
ChemSpider	21154424
ECHA InfoCard	100.007.242
EC Number	207-965-9
PubChem CID	10426
RTECS number	LQ7350000
UNII	PO4Q4R80LV
CompTox Dashboard (EPA)	DTXSID60862065
- InChI: InChI=1S/C2Cl4O2/c3-1(7)8-2(4,5)6 Key: HCUYBXPSSCRKRF-UHFFFAOYSA-N; InChI=1/C2Cl4O2/c3-1(7)8-2(4,5)6 Key: HCUYBXPSSCRKRF-UHFFFAOYAO
- SMILES: ClC(=O)OC(Cl)(Cl)Cl

Properties
Chemical formula	C_{2}Cl_{4}O_{2}
Molar mass	197.82 g/mol
Appearance	liquid at room temperature
Density	1.65 g/cm^{3}
Melting point	−57 °C (−71 °F; 216 K)
Boiling point	128 °C (262 °F; 401 K)
Solubility in water	insoluble, reacts

Hazards
- Occupational safety and health (OHS/OSH)
Main hazards	highly toxic, maybe corrosive; asphyxiant
- GHS labelling
Pictograms	(GHS05: Corrosive) (GHS06: Toxic)
Signal word	Danger
Hazard statements	H300, H301, H314, H330
Precautionary statements	P260, P264, P270, P271, P280, P284, P301+P310, P301+P330+P331, P303+P361+P353, P304+P340, P305+P351+P338, P310, P320, P321, P330, P363, P403+P233, P405, P501
Flash point	32 °C (90 °F; 305 K)

Related compounds
Related compounds	COCl_{2}, Cl_{2}
- Except where otherwise noted, data are given for materials in their standard state (at 25 °C [77 °F], 100 kPa). verify (what is ?) Infobox references

Diphosgene is an organic chemical compound with the formula ClCO_{2}CCl_{3}. This colorless liquid is a valuable reagent in the synthesis of organic compounds. Diphosgene is related to phosgene and has comparable toxicity, but is more conveniently handled because it is a liquid, whereas phosgene is a gas.

== Production and uses ==
Diphosgene is prepared by radical chlorination of methyl chloroformate under UV light:

Cl-CO-OCH_{3} + 3 Cl_{2} —(hv)→ Cl-CO-OCCl_{3} + 3 HCl

Another method is the radical chlorination of methyl formate:

H-CO-OCH_{3} + 4 Cl_{2} —(hv)→ Cl-CO-OCCl_{3} + 4 HCl

Diphosgene converts to phosgene upon heating or upon catalysis with charcoal. It is thus useful for reactions traditionally relying on phosgene. For example, it convert amines into isocyanates, secondary amines into carbamoyl chlorides, carboxylic acids into acid chlorides, and formamides into isocyanides. Diphosgene serves as a source of two equivalents of phosgene:

2 RNH_{2} + ClCO_{2}CCl_{3} → 2 RNCO + 4 HCl

With α-amino acids diphosgene gives the acid chloride-isocyanates, OCNCHRCOCl, or N-carboxy-amino acid anhydrides depending on the conditions.

It hydrolyzes to release HCl in humid air.

Diphosgene is used in some laboratory preparations because it is easier to handle than phosgene.

== Role in World War I ==
Diphosgene was originally developed as a pulmonary agent for chemical warfare, a few months after the first use of phosgene. It was used as a poison gas in artillery shells by Germany during World War I. The first recorded battlefield use was in May 1916. German forces preferred diphosgene, liquid at room temperature, because it was easier to handle than gaseous phosgene. Diphosgene was developed because the vapors could destroy the filters of the gas masks in use at the time.

== Safety ==
Diphosgene has a relatively high vapor pressure of 10 mm Hg (1.3 kPa) at 20 °C and decomposes to phosgene around 300 °C. Exposure to diphosgene is similar in hazard to phosgene.

== See also ==
- Phosgene
- Triphosgene
- Carbonyldiimidazole
