= Roland Diggle =

Roland Diggle (January 1, 1885 – January 13, 1954) was an English-born, American organist and composer who wrote and arranged an enormous number of published pieces, and who served for forty years as organist and choirmaster at St. John's Episcopal Church of Los Angeles, California.

== Biography ==
Roland Diggle was born in London, England, and he was educated at the Royal College of Music in London.

He moved to the US in 1904 where he became a tireless advocate of organ music. During his lifetime he wrote or arranged over 500 organ compositions. He was well known in national and international music circles and his works have been published both in the U.S. and abroad. He served for forty years as organist and choirmaster at St. John's Episcopal Church of Los Angeles, California (from 1914). In 1915 he presented recitals at both the San Diego and San Francisco World's Fair Expositions. He was an important figure in the American Guild of Organists.

According to Vernon Gotwals in Grove Music Online, his style was "improvisatory and facile"; his works include Benedictus omnia opera, a choral work which was formerly popular.

He died on January 13, 1954, in Los Angeles, California.
