= HMS Zealandia =

Pre-dreadnought battleship of the British Royal Navy

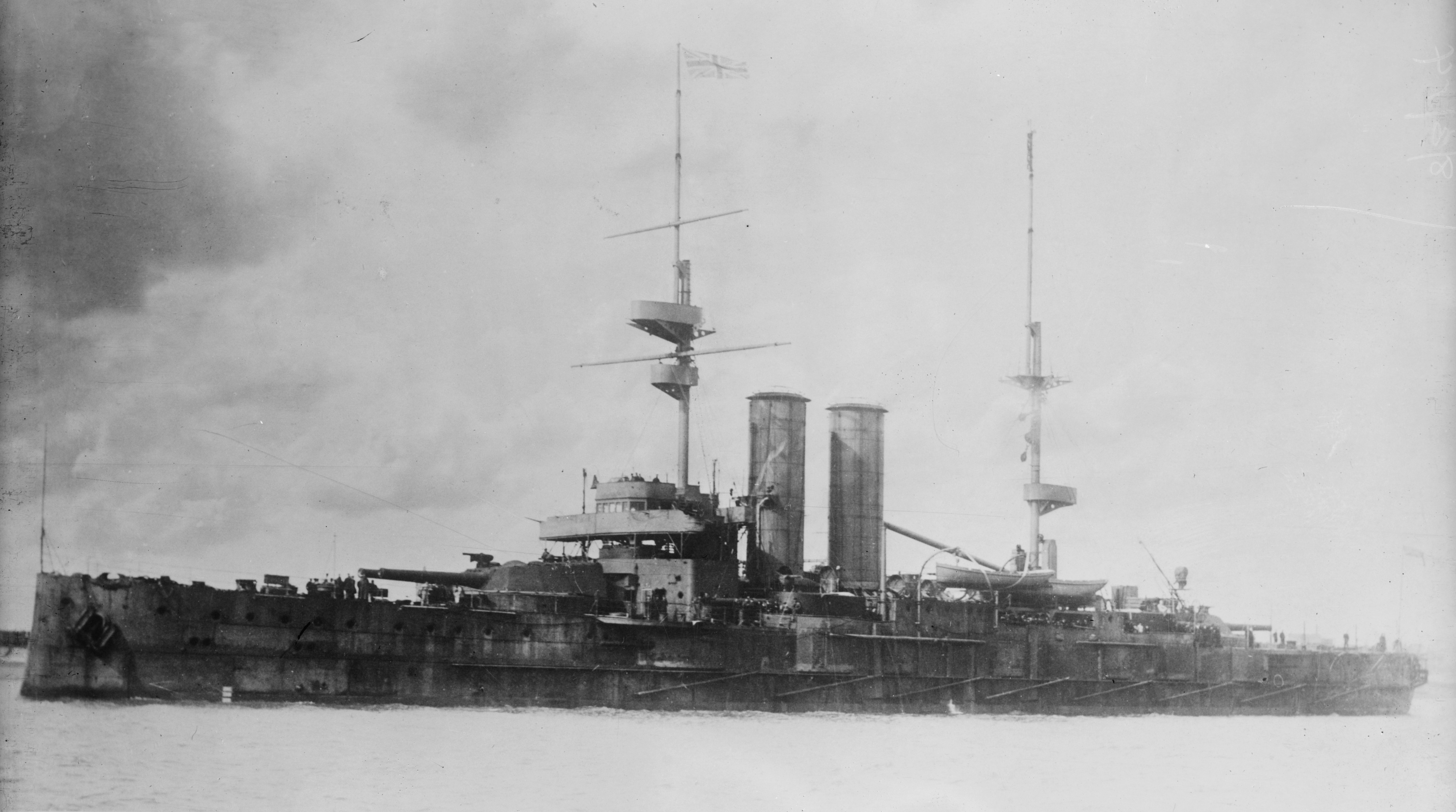
- HMS New Zealand between 1904 and 1911.

History

United Kingdom
- Name: HMS New Zealand (later HMS Zealandia)
- Namesake: As New Zealand, the country of New Zealand; As Zealandia, the personification of New Zealand
- Builder: Portsmouth Dockyard
- Laid down: 9 February 1903
- Launched: 4 February 1904
- Completed: June 1905
- Commissioned: 11 July 1905
- Decommissioned: 20 September 1917
- Renamed: Renamed HMS Zealandia on 1 December 1911
- Fate: Sold for scrapping, 8 November 1921

General characteristics
- Class & type: King Edward VII-class pre-dreadnought battleship
- Displacement: Normal: 15,585 to 15,885 long tons (15,835 to 16,140 t); Full load: 17,009 to 17,290 long tons (17,282 to 17,567 t)
- Length: 453 ft 9 in (138.3 m) (loa)
- Beam: 75 ft (22.9 m)
- Draught: 25 ft 8 in (7.82 m)
- Installed power: 16 water-tube boilers; 18,000 ihp (13,420 kW)
- Propulsion: 2 × triple-expansion steam engines; 2 × screw propellers
- Speed: 18.5 knots (34.3 km/h; 21.3 mph)
- Complement: 777
- Armament: 4 × BL 12 in (305 mm) Mk IX guns; 4 × BL 9.2 in (234 mm) Mk X guns; 10 × BL 6 in (152 mm) Mk VII guns; 14 × 12-pounder 3 in (76 mm) guns; 14 × 3-pounder 47 mm (1.9 in) guns; 4 × 18-in (450-mm) torpedo tubes (submerged)
- Armour: Belt: 9 in (229 mm); Bulkheads: 8–12 in (203–305 mm); Barbettes: 12 in; Turrets: Main battery: 8–12 in; 9.2-inch battery: 5–9 in (127–229 mm); Casemates: 7 in (178 mm); Conning tower: 12 in; Decks: 1–2.5 in (25–64 mm)

HMS New Zealand was a King Edward VII-class battleship of the Royal Navy. Like all ships of the class (apart from HMS King Edward VII) she was named after an important part of the British Empire. The ship was built by Portsmouth Dockyard between 1903 and 1905. Armed with a battery of four 12-inch (305 mm) and four 9.2 in (234 mm) guns, she and her sister ships marked a significant advance in offensive power compared to earlier British battleship designs that did not carry the 9.2 in guns.

After commissioning in July 1905, she served briefly with the Atlantic Fleet from October to March 1907 before transferring to the Channel Fleet. She then joined the Home Fleet in 1909. She was renamed HMS Zealandia in 1911. In 1912, she, along with her sister ships, was assigned to the 3rd Battle Squadron, part of the Home Fleet. That year, the squadron went to the Mediterranean Sea during the First Balkan War as part of an international blockade of Montenegro. In 1913, the ship returned to British waters.

When the First World War broke out, Zealandia was transferred back to the 3rd Battle Squadron, which was assigned to the Grand Fleet, the main British fleet during the war. Through 1914 and 1915, the ships frequently went to sea to search for German vessels, but Zealandia saw no action during this period. By the end of the year, the Grand Fleet stopped operating with the older 3rd Battle Squadron ships, and in November 1915, Zealandia was detached to serve in the Gallipoli Campaign. The campaign ended shortly thereafter, however, and so Zealandia returned to Britain in January 1916 and rejoined the 3rd Battle Squadron in March. Paid off in late 1917, the ship was converted into a gunnery training ship in early 1918, but she never served in that capacity. In 1919, she was used as a barracks ship before being sold in 1921 and broken up in 1923.

== Design ==
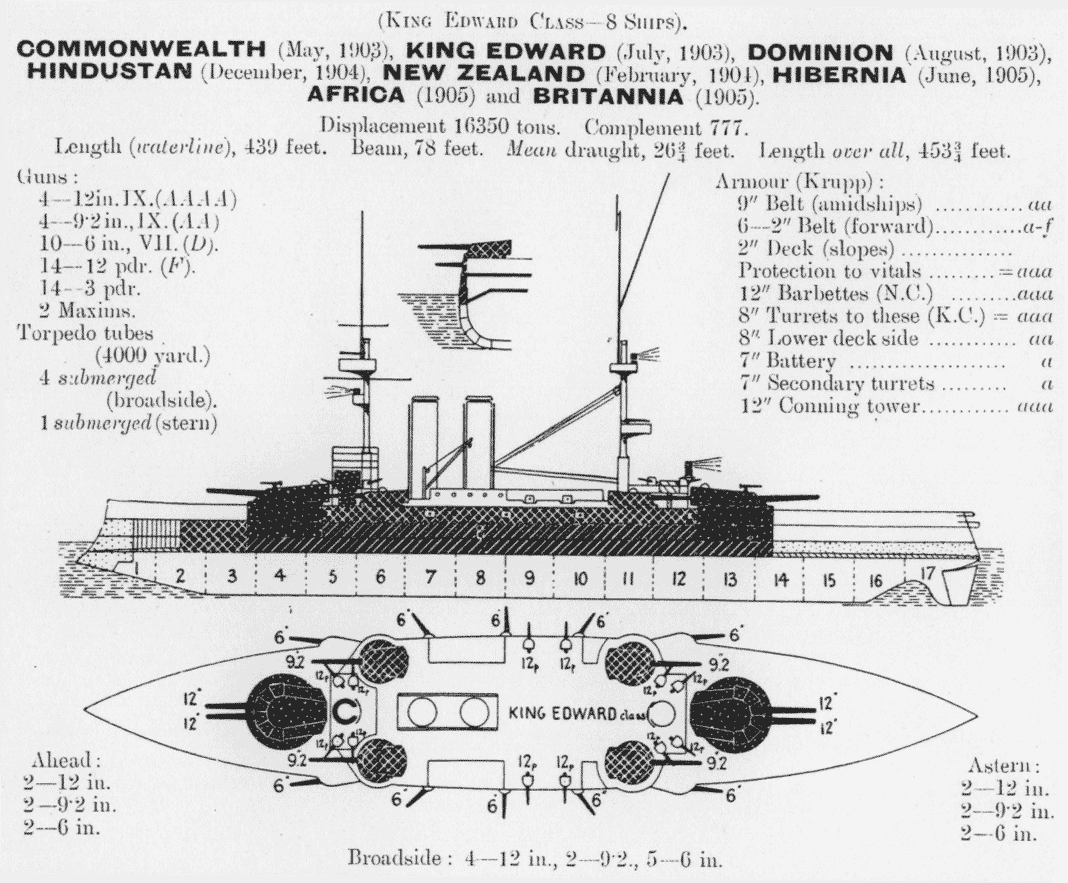
Left elevation and deck plan as depicted in Jane's Fighting Ships

Following the development of pre-dreadnought type battleships carrying heavy secondary guns of 8-inch (203 mm) diameter in the Italian Regia Marina and the United States Navy, the Royal Navy decided to build similar ships. Initial proposals called for a battleship equipped with eight 7.5 in (190 mm) guns to support the main battery, though under the direction of William Henry White, the Director of Naval Construction, these were replaced with four 9.2 in (234 mm) guns. The new ships, though based on the general Majestic type that had formed the basis of the preceding four battleship designs, marked the first significant change in the series. Like all late pre-dreadnoughts that entered service in the mid-1900s, New Zealand was made almost instantaneously obsolescent by the commissioning of the all-big-gun HMS Dreadnought in December 1906, armed with a battery of ten heavy guns compared to the typical four of most pre-dreadnoughts.

New Zealand was 453 feet 9 inches (138.30 m) long overall, with a beam of 75 ft (23 m) and a draft of 25 ft 8 in (7.82 m). The King Edward VII-class battleships displaced 15,585 to 15,885 long tons (15,835 to 16,140 t) normally and up to 17,009 to 17,290 long tons (17,282 to 17,567 t) fully loaded. Her crew numbered 777 officers and ratings. The King Edward VII-class ships were powered by a pair of 4-cylinder triple-expansion engines that drove two screws, with steam provided by sixteen water-tube boilers. The boilers were trunked into two funnels located amidships. The King Edward VII-class ships had a top speed of 18.5 knots (34.3 km/h; 21.3 mph) from 18,000 indicated horsepower (13,000 kW).

New Zealand had a main battery of four 12-inch (305 mm) 40-calibre guns mounted in twin-gun turrets fore and aft. These were supported by a heavy secondary battery of four 9.2 in (234 mm) guns in four single turrets, two on each broadside. The ships also mounted ten 6-inch (152 mm) 45-calibre guns mounted in casemates, in addition to fourteen 12-pounder 3 in (76 mm) guns and fourteen 3-pounder 47 mm (1.9 in) guns for defence against torpedo boats. As was customary for battleships of the period, she was also equipped with five 18-inch (457 mm) torpedo tubes submerged in the hull; two were on each broadside, with the fifth in the stern.

New Zealand had an armoured belt that was 9 inches (229 mm) thick; the transverse bulkheads on the aft end of the belt was 8 to 12 in (203 to 305 mm) thick. The sides of her main battery turrets were also 8 to 12 in thick, atop 12 in barbettes, and the 9.2 turrets had 5 to 9 in (127 to 229 mm) sides. The casemate battery was protected with 7 in (178 mm) of armour plate. Her conning tower had 12-inch-thick sides. She was fitted with two armoured decks, 1 and 2.5 in (25 and 64 mm) thick, respectively.

== Service history ==
=== Early career ===
HMS New Zealand, named for the Colony of New Zealand, was ordered under the 1902/1903 Naval Estimates and built at Portsmouth Dockyard. She was laid down on 9 February 1903, launched on 4 February 1904, and completed in June 1905. New Zealand commissioned on 11 July at Devonport Dockyard for service in the Atlantic Fleet. She underwent a refit at Gibraltar from October to December 1906, and transferred to the Channel Fleet on 4 March 1907. That year, the ship underwent a refit that included the installation of new fire control equipment and searchlights. Under a fleet reorganisation on 24 March 1909, the Channel Fleet became the 2nd Division, Home Fleet, and New Zealand became a Home Fleet unit in that division.

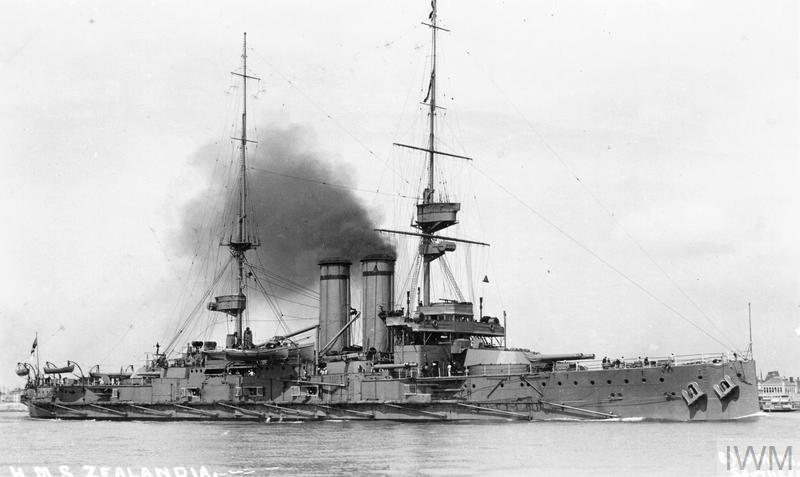
Zealandia at Portsmouth

To release her name for use by the new battlecruiser New Zealand, which had been presented to the Royal Navy by the government of New Zealand, it became necessary to rename New Zealand in 1911. At first the name Caledonia, the Roman name for Scotland, was favoured, but this met opposition in New Zealand. Eventually, the name Zealandia, a personification of New Zealand, was agreed upon, and the ship was renamed Zealandia on 1 December 1911.

Under a fleet reorganisation in May 1912, Zealandia and all seven of her sisters (Africa, Britannia, Commonwealth, Dominion, Hibernia, Hindustan, and King Edward VII) were assigned to form the 3rd Battle Squadron, part of the First Fleet, Home Fleet. The squadron was detached to the Mediterranean Sea in November because of the First Balkan War (October 1912 – May 1913); it arrived at Malta on 27 November and subsequently participated in a blockade by an international force of Montenegro and in an occupation of Scutari. The squadron returned to the United Kingdom in 1913 and rejoined the Home Fleet on 27 June.

=== First World War ===
==== With the Grand Fleet ====
Map of the North Sea

Upon the outbreak of the First World War in August 1914, the 3rd Battle Squadron, at the time under the command of Vice Admiral Edward Bradford, was assigned to the Grand Fleet and based at Rosyth, where it was reinforced with the five Duncan-class battleships, It was used to supplement the Grand Fleet's cruisers on the Northern Patrol. On 6 August, the day after Britain declared war on Germany, elements of the Grand Fleet sortied to inspect the coast of Norway in search of a German naval base violating Norwegian neutrality. Zealandia and the rest of the 3rd Battle Squadron provided distant support to the operation. No such base was found, and the ships returned to port the next day. On 14 August, the ships of the Grand Fleet went to sea for battle practice before conducting a sweep into the North Sea later that day and into 15 August. During sweeps by the fleet, she and her sisters often steamed at the heads of divisions of the far more valuable dreadnoughts, where they could protect the dreadnoughts by watching for mines or by being the first to strike them. On 2 November 1914, the squadron was detached to reinforce the Channel Fleet and was rebased at Portland. It returned to the Grand Fleet on 13 November 1914.

On 14 December, the 1st Battlecruiser Squadron, 2nd Battle Squadron, and accompanying cruisers and destroyers left port to intercept the German forces preparing to raid Scarborough, Hartlepool and Whitby. On the first reports of contact with German units on the morning of 16 December, the Grand Fleet commander, Admiral John Jellicoe, ordered Bradford to take the 3rd Battle Squadron to support the ships in contact at 10:00. Four hours later, they met the 1st and 4th Battle Squadrons, en route from Scapa Flow, though they failed to reach the German High Seas Fleet before the latter withdrew. The Grand Fleet remained at sea until late on 17 December, at which point the 3rd Battle Squadron was ordered back to Rosyth. Zealandia and the rest of the squadron joined the Grand Fleet for another sweep into the North Sea on 25 December. The fleet returned to its ports two days later, having failed to locate any German vessels.

The 3rd Battle Squadron went to sea on 12 January 1915 for gunnery training, steaming north and passing to the west of Orkney on the night of 13–14 January. After completing training on the 14th, they returned to Rosyth on 15 January. On 23 January, the 1st and 2nd Battlecruiser Squadrons sortied to ambush the German I Scouting Group in what resulted in the Battle of Dogger Bank the following day. Later on the 23rd, the rest of the Grand Fleet, including Zealandia, sortied to support the battlecruisers. The 3rd Squadron ships left first and steamed at full speed to reach ships of the Harwich Force, which had reported contact with German vessels. The battlecruisers intervened first, and Zealandia and her sisters arrived around 14:00, by which time the battlecruisers had sunk the armoured cruiser Blücher and the surviving German ships had fled. The 3rd Battle Squadron patrolled the area with the rest of the Grand Fleet over the night before being detached at 08:00 on 25 January to steam to Rosyth.

Elements of the Grand Fleet went to sea repeatedly over the next few months. The 3rd Battle Squadron patrolled the central North Sea in company with the 3rd Cruiser Squadron from 10 to 13 March. The two units again went to sea to sweep the central North Sea from 5 to 8 April. A major fleet operation followed on 11 April, with the entire Grand Fleet sortieing for a sweep of the North Sea on 12 and 13 April. The squadrons returned to their ports on 14 April to replenish their fuel. Another such operation followed on 17 April, which also failed to find any German ships. The 3rd Battle Squadron returned to Rosyth late on 18 April. The fleet sortied again on 21 April, returning to port two days later. The 3rd Battle Squadron, joined by the 3rd Cruiser Squadron, patrolled the northern North Sea from 5 to 10 May, during which a German U-boat attacked the battleships but failed to score a hit.

Another sweep into the North Sea took place on 17–19 May, and no German forces were encountered. The fleet went to sea again on 29 May for a patrol south to the Dogger Bank before returning to port on 31 May, again without having located any German vessels. The Grand Fleet spent much of June in port conducting training, but the most modern units went to sea on 11 June for gunnery practice to the northwest of Shetland. While they were training, Zealandia and the rest of the 3rd Battle Squadron, along with the 3rd Cruiser Squadron, patrolled the central North Sea. Fleet activities were limited in July, owing to a threatened strike by coal miners, which began on 18 July and threatened the supply of coal for the fleet's ships. The strike continued into August, which led Jellicoe to continue to limit fleet activities to preserve his stocks of coal. The fleet saw little activity in September, and during this period, the Grand Fleet began to go to sea without the older ships of the 3rd Battle Squadron.

==== Later operations ====
On 6 November 1915, a division of the 3rd Battle Squadron, consisting of the battleships Zealandia, Hibernia (the flagship), Russell, and Albemarle, was detached from the Grand Fleet to serve in the Gallipoli Campaign. Albemarle had to return for repairs, assisted by Hibernia and accompanied by Zealandia, after suffering severe damage in heavy seas on the first night of the outbound voyage. Zealandia incurred damage to her gun ports, which also necessitated repairs. After work on Zealandia was completed, she, Russell, and Hibernia pressed on and arrived at the Dardanelles on 14 December 1915. In late January 1916, Zealandia and Hibernia left the eastern Mediterranean to return to the United Kingdom, arriving at Portsmouth Dockyard on 6 February 1916. Zealandia underwent a refit there that lasted until March 1916, after which the ship rejoined the 3rd Battle Squadron and the Grand Fleet on 26 March 1916.

On 29 April 1916, the 3rd Battle Squadron was rebased at Sheerness, and on 3 May 1916 it was separated from the Grand Fleet, being transferred to the Nore Command. Zealandia remained there with the squadron until September 1917, undergoing a refit at Chatham Dockyard from December 1916 to June 1917, which saw the 6-inch guns removed from their casemate mounts, four of which were re-mounted in shielded pivot mounts where the 12-pounder guns had been located on the upper deck. On 20 September 1917, Zealandia left the 3rd Battle Squadron and paid off into reserve at Portsmouth Dockyard. While in reserve, she was refitted between January and September 1918 for use as a gunnery training ship, receiving much of the upgraded fire control equipment that her sister ship Commonwealth did, although not torpedo bulges. She also received a pair of 3-inch anti-aircraft guns. Although she never recommissioned or entered service as a gunnery training ship, she was included in many experiments, including the use of various types of fire control equipment. She was used as an accommodation ship at Portsmouth beginning in 1919. Zealandia was placed on the disposal list on 2 June 1919, and on 8 November 1921 she was sold for scrapping to Stanlee Shipbreaking Company. She was resold to Slough Trading Company, then resold again to German scrappers, and left Portsmouth on 23 November 1923 for scrapping in Germany.
