= HMS Hindustan (1903) =

Pre-dreadnought battleship of the British Royal Navy

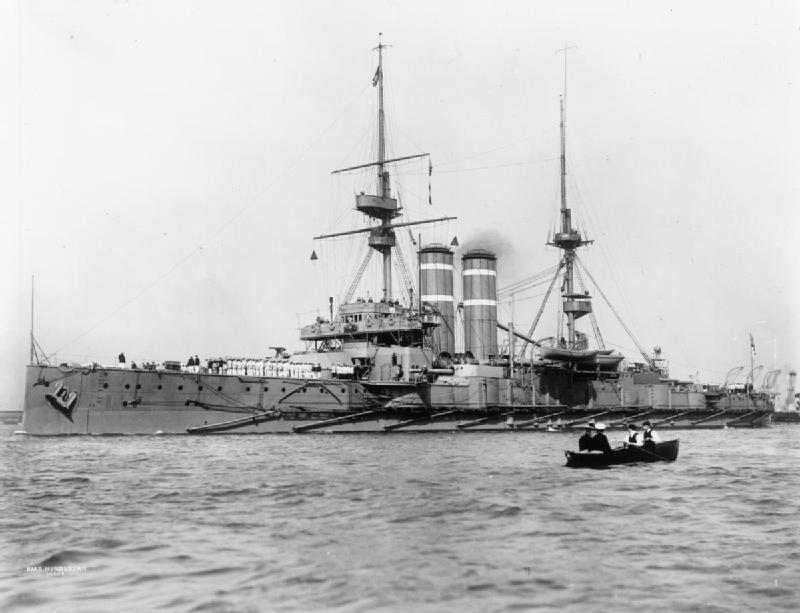
- HMS Hindustan

History

United Kingdom
- Name: HMS Hindustan
- Namesake: Hindustan
- Builder: John Brown & Company, Clydebank
- Laid down: 25 October 1902
- Launched: 19 December 1903
- Completed: March 1905
- Commissioned: 22 August 1905
- Decommissioned: 15 May 1918
- Fate: Sold for scrapping 9 May 1921

General characteristics
- Class & type: King Edward VII-class pre-dreadnought battleship
- Displacement: Normal: 15,585 to 15,885 long tons (15,835 to 16,140 t); Full load: 17,009 to 17,290 long tons (17,282 to 17,567 t)
- Length: 453 ft 9 in (138.3 m) (loa)
- Beam: 75 ft (22.9 m)
- Draught: 25 ft 8 in (7.82 m)
- Installed power: 16 water-tube boilers; 18,000 ihp (13,420 kW)
- Propulsion: 2 × triple-expansion steam engines; 2 × screw propellers
- Speed: 18.5 knots (34.3 km/h; 21.3 mph)
- Complement: 777
- Armament: 4 × BL 12 in (305 mm) Mk IX guns; 4 × BL 9.2 in (234 mm) Mk X guns; 10 × BL 6 in (152 mm) Mk VII guns; 14 × 12-pounder 3 in (76 mm) guns; 14 × 3-pounder 47 mm (1.9 in) guns; 4 × 18-in (450-mm) torpedo tubes (submerged)
- Armour: Belt: 9 in (229 mm); Bulkheads: 8–12 in (203–305 mm); Barbettes: 12 in; Turrets: Main battery: 8–12 in; 9.2-inch battery: 5–9 in (127–229 mm); Casemates: 7 in (178 mm); Conning tower: 12 in; Decks: 1–2.5 in (25–64 mm)

HMS Hindustan was a King Edward VII-class pre-dreadnought battleship of the Royal Navy. Like all ships of the class (apart from HMS King Edward VII) she was named after an important part of the British Empire, namely the Indian Empire. The ship was built by John Brown & Company; she was laid down in October 1902, was launched in December 1903, and was completed in March 1905. Armed with a battery of four 12-inch (305 mm) and four 9.2 in (234 mm) guns, she and her sister ships marked a significant advance in offensive power compared to earlier British battleship designs that did not carry the 9.2 in guns.

Hindustan was commissioned in August 1905 for service with the Atlantic Fleet, moving to the Channel Fleet in 1907. When the latter fleet was reorganised to the Home Fleet in 1909, she was attached to that fleet. In 1912, Hindustan and her sister ships formed the 3rd Battle Squadron; that year, the squadron went to the Mediterranean Sea during the First Balkan War as part of an international blockade of Montenegro. In 1913, she returned to British waters.

The squadron was assigned to the Grand Fleet at the beginning of the First World War, and served on the Northern Patrol. Through 1914 and 1915, the ships frequently went to sea to search for German vessels, but Hindustan saw no action during this period. By the end of the year, the Grand Fleet stopped operating with the older 3rd Battle Squadron ships, and in 1916, the squadron was transferred to Nore Command. Hindustan served there until she was detached in February 1918 to serve as a depot ship for the raids on Zeebrugge and Ostend. Decommissioned in May 1918, she finished the war as a barracks ship, and was broken up in 1923.

== Design ==
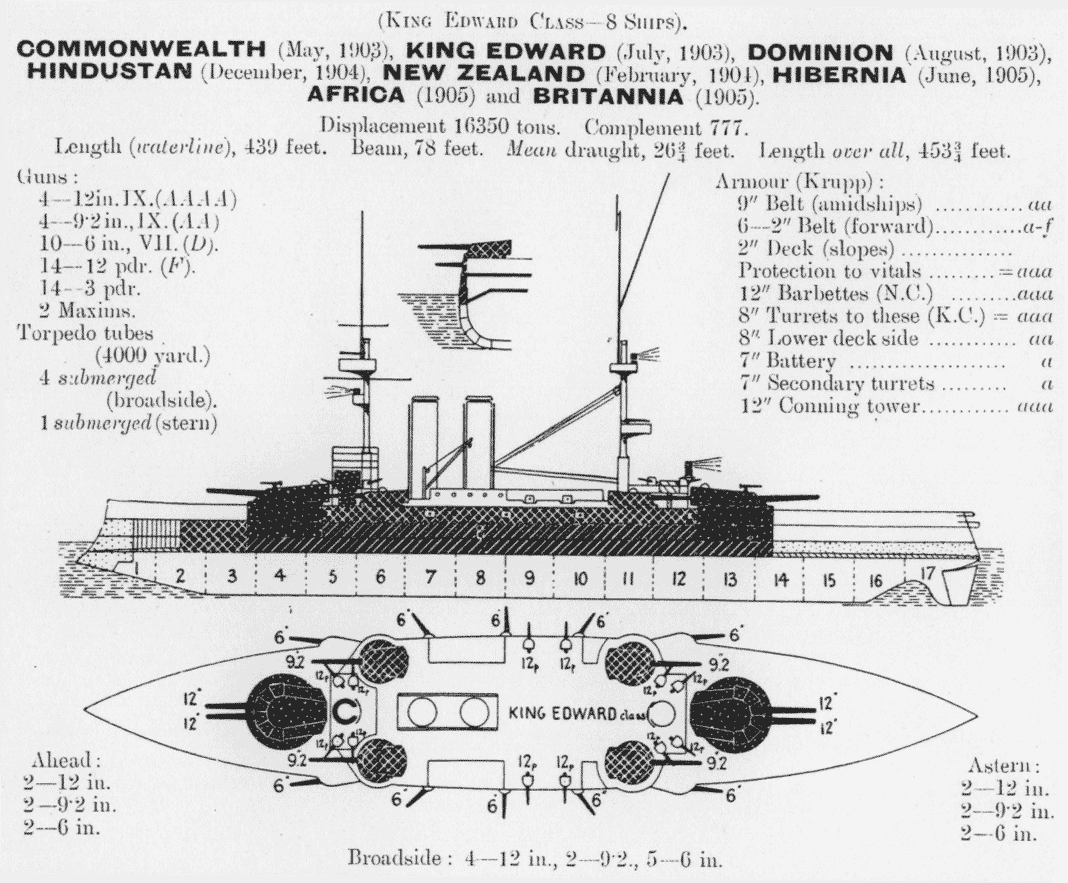
Left elevation and deck plan as depicted in Jane's Fighting Ships

Following the development of pre-dreadnought type battleships carrying heavy secondary guns of 8-inch (203 mm) diameter in the Italian Regia Marina and the United States Navy, the Royal Navy decided to build similar ships. Initial proposals called for a battleship equipped with eight 7.5 in (190 mm) guns to support the main battery, though under the direction of William Henry White, the Director of Naval Construction, these were replaced with four 9.2 in (234 mm) guns. The new ships, though based on the general Majestic type that had formed the basis of the preceding four battleship designs, marked the first significant change in the series. Like all late pre-dreadnoughts that entered service in the mid-1900s, Hindustan was made almost instantaneously obsolescent by the commissioning of the all-big-gun HMS Dreadnought in December 1906, armed with a battery of ten heavy guns compared to the typical four of most pre-dreadnoughts.

Hindustan was 453 feet 9 inches (138.30 m) long overall, with a beam of 75 ft (23 m) and a draft of 25 ft 8 in (7.82 m). The King Edward VII-class battleships displaced 15,585 to 15,885 long tons (15,835 to 16,140 t) normally and up to 17,009 to 17,290 long tons (17,282 to 17,567 t) fully loaded. Her crew numbered 777 officers and ratings. The King Edward VII-class ships were powered by a pair of 4-cylinder triple-expansion engines that drove two screws, with steam provided by sixteen water-tube boilers. The boilers were trunked into two funnels located amidships. The King Edward VII-class ships had a top speed of 18.5 knots (34.3 km/h; 21.3 mph) from 18,000 indicated horsepower (13,000 kW).

Hindustan had a main battery of four 12-inch (305 mm) 40-calibre guns mounted in twin-gun turrets fore and aft. These were supported by a heavy secondary battery of four 9.2 in (234 mm) guns in four single turrets, two on each broadside. The ships also mounted ten 6-inch (152 mm) 45-calibre guns mounted in casemates, in addition to fourteen 12-pounder 3 in (76 mm) guns and fourteen 3-pounder 47 mm (1.9 in) guns for defence against torpedo boats. As was customary for battleships of the period, she was also equipped with five 18-inch (457 mm) torpedo tubes submerged in the hull; two were on each broadside, with the fifth in the stern.

Hindustan had an armoured belt that was 9 inches (229 mm) thick; the transverse bulkheads on the aft end of the belt was 8 to 12 in (203 to 305 mm) thick. The sides of her main battery turrets were also 8 to 12 in thick, atop 12 in barbettes, and the 9.2 turrets had 5 to 9 in (127 to 229 mm) sides. The casemate battery was protected with 7 in (178 mm) of armour plate. Her conning tower had 12-inch-thick sides. She was fitted with two armoured decks, 1 and 2.5 in (25 and 64 mm) thick, respectively.

== Service history ==
=== Early career ===
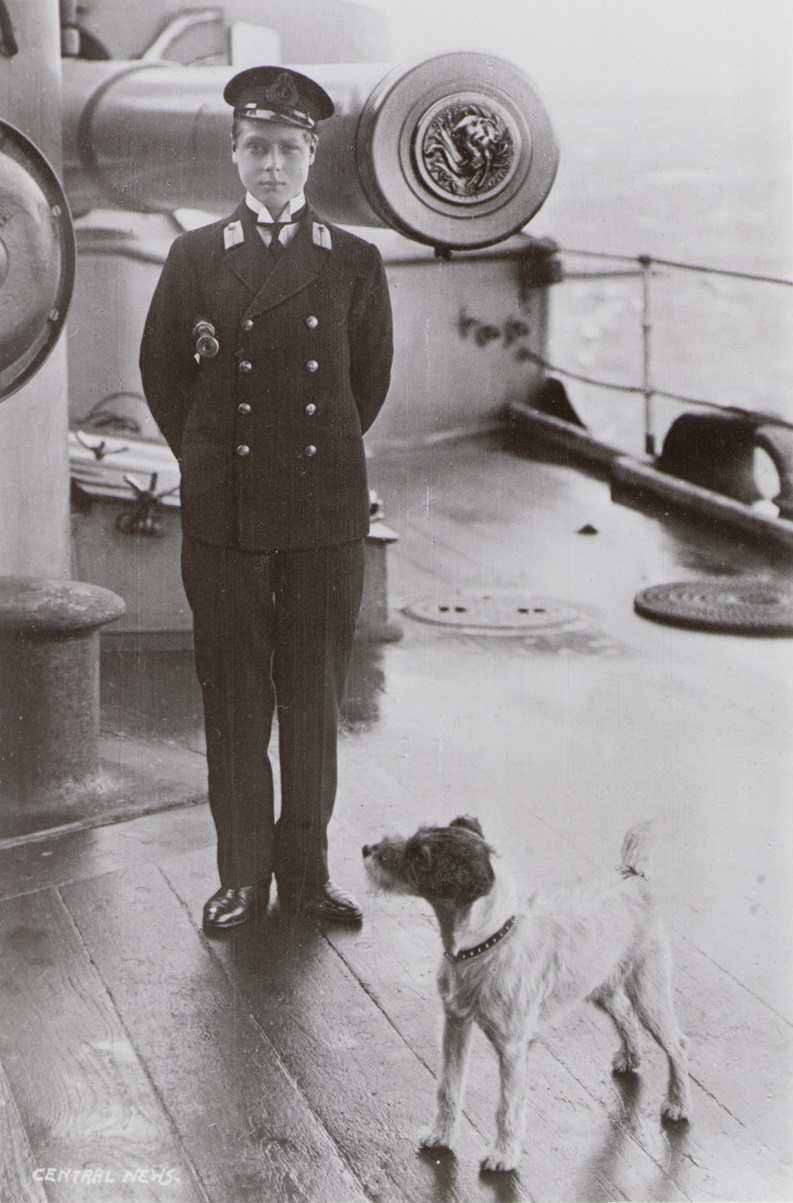
The future King Edward VIII as a midshipman, standing in front of a 9.2 inch gun onboard the ship, 1911.

HMS Hindustan was built by John Brown & Company at Clydebank. She was laid down on 25 October 1902 and was launched on 19 December 1903. She began sea trials in January 1905 and was completed in March 1905. Upon completion, Hindustan was placed in reserve. She went into full commission on 22 August at Portsmouth Dockyard for service in the Atlantic Fleet. She transferred to the Channel Fleet in March 1907. Under a fleet reorganization on 24 March 1909, the Channel Fleet became the 2nd Division, Home Fleet, and Hindustan became a Home Fleet unit in that division. She underwent a refit at Portsmouth in 1909–1910. During target practice in November 1911, a shell from the new dreadnought battleship Colossus accidentally struck Hindustan, but caused no casualties.

Under a fleet reorganization in May 1912, Hindustan and all seven of her sisters (Africa, Britannia, Commonwealth, Dominion, Hibernia, King Edward VII and Zealandia were assigned to form the 3rd Battle Squadron, assigned to the First Fleet, Home Fleet. The squadron was detached to the Mediterranean in November because of the First Balkan War (October 1912 – May 1913); it arrived at Malta on 27 November and subsequently participated in a blockade by an international force of Montenegro and in an occupation of Scutari. Hindustan and Africa returned to the United Kingdom in February 1913 and rejoined the Home Fleet; they were attached to the 4th Battle Squadron, then transferred back to the 3rd Battle Squadron upon that squadron's return to the United Kingdom and the Home Fleet on 27 June 1913.

=== First World War ===
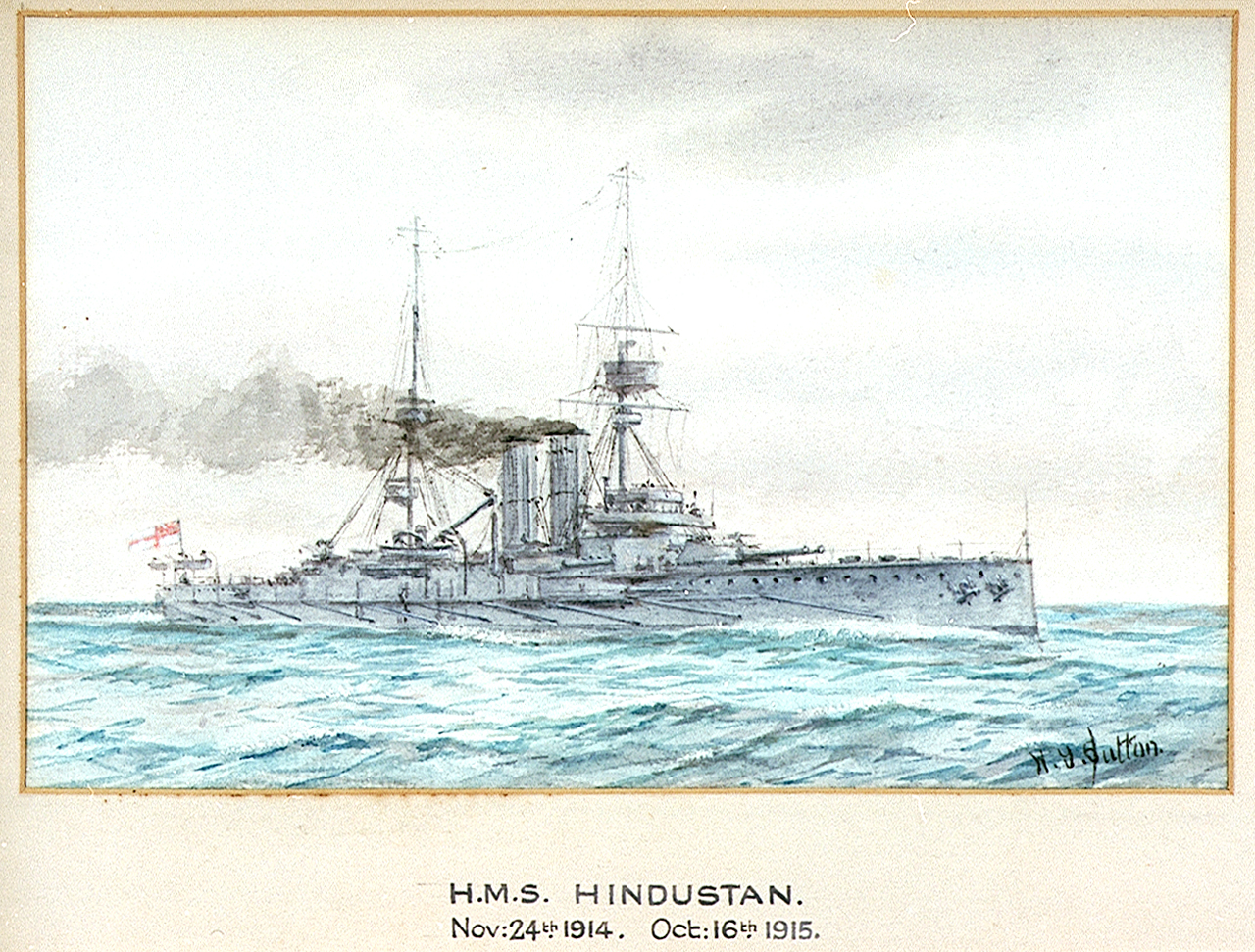
Watercolor of HMS Hindustan, c. 1915

Upon the outbreak of the First World War in August 1914, the 3rd Battle Squadron, at the time under the command of Vice Admiral Edward Bradford, was assigned to the Grand Fleet and based at Rosyth, where it was reinforced with the five Duncan-class battleships, It was used to supplement the Grand Fleet's cruisers on the Northern Patrol. On 6 August, the day after Britain declared war on Germany, elements of the Grand Fleet sortied to inspect the coast of Norway in search of a German naval base violating Norwegian neutrality. Hindustan and the rest of the 3rd Battle Squadron provided distant support to the operation. No such base was found, and the ships returned to port the next day. On 14 August, the ships of the Grand Fleet went to sea for battle practice before conducting a sweep into the North Sea later that day and into 15 August. During sweeps by the fleet, she and her sisters often steamed at the heads of divisions of the far more valuable dreadnoughts, where they could protect the dreadnoughts by watching for mines or by being the first to strike them. On 2 November 1914, the squadron was detached to reinforce the Channel Fleet and was rebased at Portland. It returned to the Grand Fleet on 13 November 1914.

On 14 December, the 1st Battlecruiser Squadron, 2nd Battle Squadron, and accompanying cruisers and destroyers left port to intercept the German forces preparing to raid Scarborough, Hartlepool and Whitby. On the first reports of contact with German units on the morning of 16 December, the Grand Fleet commander, Admiral John Jellicoe, ordered Bradford to take the 3rd Battle Squadron to support the ships in contact at 10:00. Four hours later, they met the 1st and 4th Battle Squadrons, en route from Scapa Flow, though they failed to reach the German High Seas Fleet before the latter withdrew. The Grand Fleet remained at sea until late on 17 December, at which point the 3rd Battle Squadron was ordered back to Rosyth. Hindustan and the rest of the squadron joined the Grand Fleet for another sweep into the North Sea on 25 December. The fleet returned to its ports two days later, having failed to locate any German vessels.

Map of the North Sea

The 3rd Battle Squadron went to sea on 12 January 1915 for gunnery training, steaming north and passing to the west of Orkney on the night of 13–14 January. After completing training on the 14th, they returned to Rosyth on 15 January. On 23 January, the 1st and 2nd Battlecruiser Squadrons sortied to ambush the German I Scouting Group in what resulted in the Battle of Dogger Bank the following day. Later on the 23rd, the rest of the Grand Fleet, including Hindustan, sortied to support the battlecruisers. The 3rd Squadron ships left first and steamed at full speed to reach ships of the Harwich Force, which had reported contact with German vessels. The battlecruisers intervened first, and Hindustan and her sisters arrived around 14:00, by which time the battlecruisers had sunk the armoured cruiser Blücher and the surviving German ships had fled. The 3rd Battle Squadron patrolled the area with the rest of the Grand Fleet over the night before being detached at 08:00 on 25 January to steam to Rosyth.

Elements of the Grand Fleet went to sea repeatedly over the next few months. The 3rd Battle Squadron patrolled the central North Sea in company with the 3rd Cruiser Squadron from 10 to 13 March. The two units again went to sea to sweep the central North Sea from 5 to 8 April. A major fleet operation followed on 11 April, with the entire Grand Fleet sortieing for a sweep of the North Sea on 12 and 13 April. The squadrons returned to their ports on 14 April to replenish their fuel. Another such operation followed on 17 April, which also failed to find any German ships. The 3rd Battle Squadron returned to Rosyth late on 18 April. The fleet sortied again on 21 April, returning to port two days later. The 3rd Battle Squadron, joined by the 3rd Cruiser Squadron, patrolled the northern North Sea from 5 to 10 May, during which a German U-boat attacked the battleships but failed to score a hit.

Another sweep into the North Sea took place on 17–19 May, and no German forces were encountered. The fleet went to sea again on 29 May for a patrol south to the Dogger Bank before returning to port on 31 May, again without having located any German vessels. The Grand Fleet spent much of June in port conducting training, but the most modern units went to sea on 11 June for gunnery practice to the northwest of Shetland. While they were training, Hindustan and the rest of the 3rd Battle Squadron, along with the 3rd Cruiser Squadron, patrolled the central North Sea. Fleet activities were limited in July, owing to a threatened strike by coal miners, which began on 18 July and threatened the supply of coal for the fleet's ships. The strike continued into August, which led Jellicoe to continue to limit fleet activities to preserve his stocks of coal. The fleet saw little activity in September, and during this period, the Grand Fleet began to go to sea without the older ships of the 3rd Battle Squadron.

On 29 April 1916, the 3rd Battle Squadron was rebased at Sheerness, and on 3 May 1916 it was separated from the Grand Fleet, being transferred to the Nore Command. Hindustan remained there with the squadron until February 1918. Hindustan left the 3rd Battle Squadron in February 1918 when she selected to serve as a parent ship for preparations for the Zeebrugge Raid and first Ostend Raid and served as depot ship for the raids. She was stationed in the Swin (Thames) in this capacity until May 1918, and collided with and badly damaged the destroyer HMS Wrestler in May 1918, though Hindustan was not herself damaged. On 15 May 1918, Hindustan paid off into reserve at the Nore, and was employed as an accommodation ship for the Royal Naval Barracks at Chatham Dockyard. She was placed on the disposal list at Chatham in June 1919 and on the sale list in August 1919. She was sold for scrapping to Thos. W. Ward on 9 May 1921. She was towed to Belfast for stripping in 1923 and arrived at Preston for scrapping on 14 October 1923.
