= HMS Commonwealth =

Pre-dreadnought battleship of the British Royal Navy

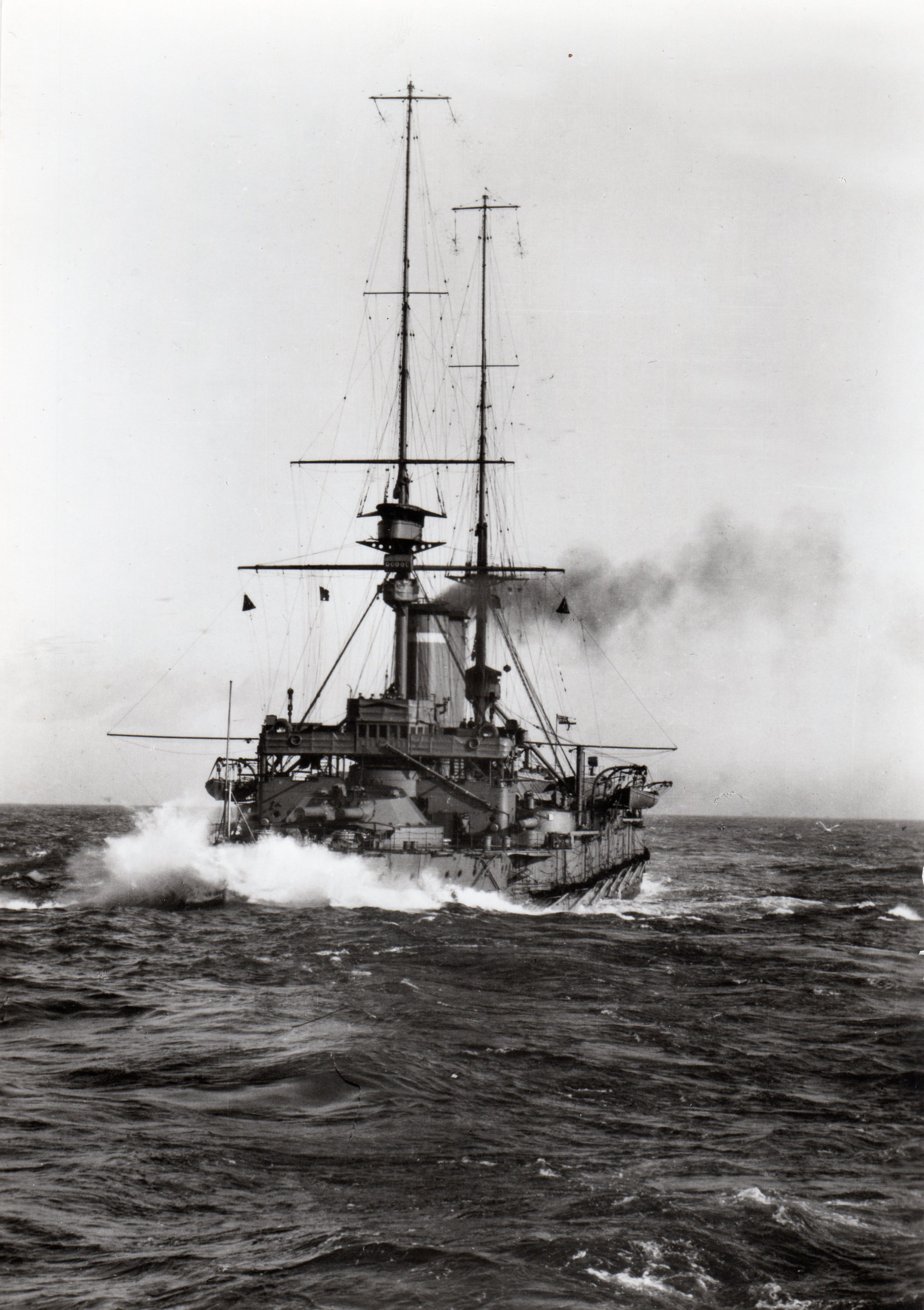
- HMS Commonwealth in heavy seas in 1912

History

United Kingdom
- Name: HMS Commonwealth
- Namesake: The Commonwealth of Australia
- Builder: Fairfield Shipbuilding and Engineering Company, Govan
- Laid down: 17 June 1902
- Launched: 13 May 1903
- Completed: March 1905
- Commissioned: 9 May 1905
- Decommissioned: February 1921
- Fate: Sold for scrapping 18 November 1921

General characteristics
- Class & type: King Edward VII-class pre-dreadnought battleship
- Displacement: Normal: 15,585 to 15,885 long tons (15,835 to 16,140 t); Full load: 17,009 to 17,290 long tons (17,282 to 17,567 t)
- Length: 453 ft 9 in (138.3 m) (loa)
- Beam: 75 ft (22.9 m)
- Draught: 25 ft 8 in (7.82 m)
- Installed power: 16 water-tube boilers; 18,000 ihp (13,420 kW)
- Propulsion: 2 × triple-expansion steam engines; 2 × screw propellers
- Speed: 18.5 knots (34.3 km/h; 21.3 mph)
- Complement: 777
- Armament: 4 × BL 12 in (305 mm) Mk IX guns; 4 × BL 9.2 in (234 mm) Mk X guns; 10 × BL 6 in (152 mm) Mk VII guns; 14 × 12-pounder 3 in (76 mm) guns; 14 × 3-pounder 47 mm (1.9 in) guns; 4 × 18-in (450-mm) torpedo tubes (submerged)
- Armour: Belt: 9 in (229 mm); Bulkheads: 8–12 in (203–305 mm); Barbettes: 12 in; Turrets: Main battery: 8–12 in; 9.2-inch battery: 5–9 in (127–229 mm); Casemates: 7 in (178 mm); Conning tower: 12 in; Decks: 1–2.5 in (25–64 mm)

HMS Commonwealth was a King Edward VII-class battleship of the British Royal Navy. Like all ships of the class (apart from HMS King Edward VII) she was named after an important part of the British Empire, namely the Commonwealth of Australia. Armed with a battery of four 12-inch (305 mm) and four 9.2 in (234 mm) guns, she and her sister ships marked a significant advance in offensive power compared to earlier British battleship designs that did not carry the 9.2 in guns. Commonwealth was built at the Fairfield Shipbuilding and Engineering Company, and was laid down in June 1902, launched in May 1903, and completed in March 1905.

After commissioning in March 1905, she served with the Atlantic Fleet until she was involved in a collision with HMS Albemarle in early 1907. While being repaired, she was transferred into what would become known as the Home Fleet. Following a reorganisation of the fleet in 1912, she, along with her sister ships formed the 3rd Battle Squadron, which served in the Mediterranean during the First Balkan War. The squadron returned to Britain in 1913 and remained there into 1914.

When the First World War broke out in August 1914, the 3rd Battle Squadron was assigned to the Grand Fleet, with Commonwealth conducting operations around Scotland and the North Sea as part of the Northern Patrol. The 3rd Battle Squadron was also involved in patrols of the entire Grand Fleet, though it did not see action against German forces. In 1916, the squadron was detached to the Nore Command. In 1917, the Commonwealth was updated, the only ship of her class to receive technology equivalent to that of the dreadnoughts. She ended the war as a gunnery training ship, continuing in this role until February 1921, at which time she was decommissioned and disposed of.

== Design ==
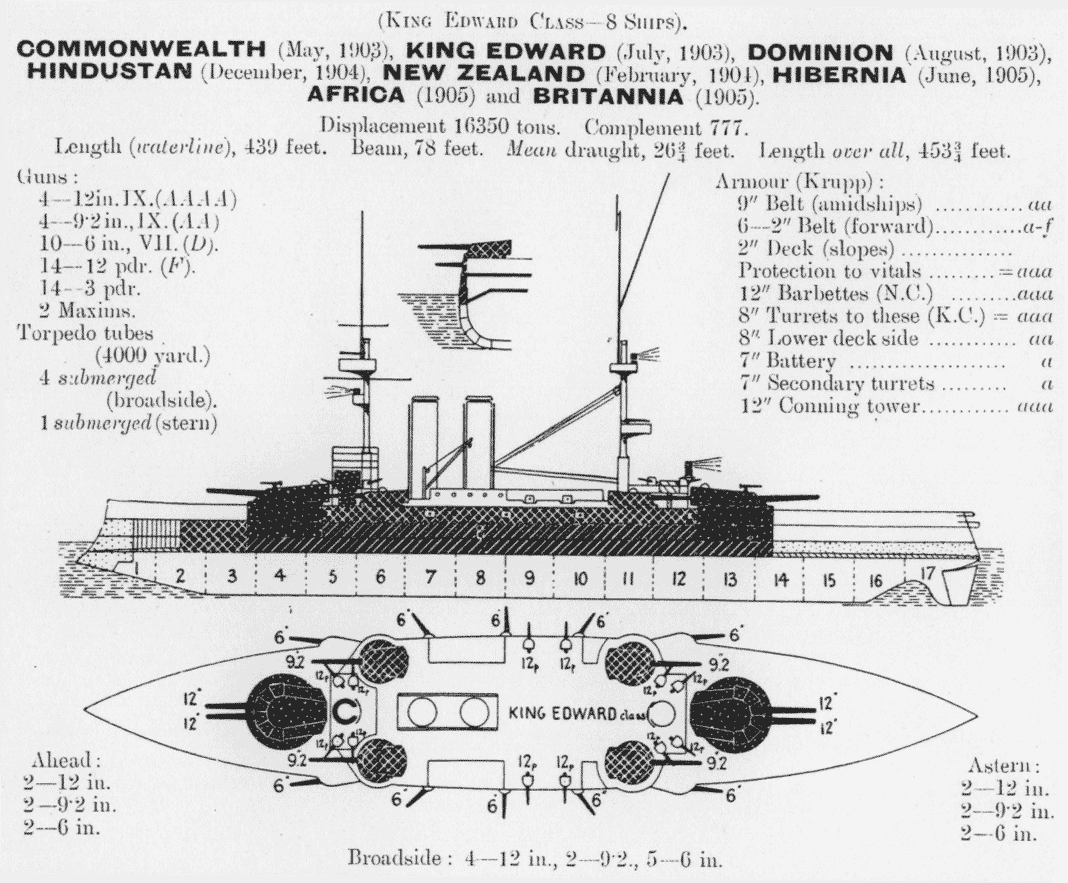
Left elevation and deck plan as depicted in Jane's Fighting Ships

Following the development of pre-dreadnought type battleships carrying heavy secondary guns of 8-inch (203 mm) diameter in the Italian Regia Marina and the United States Navy, the Royal Navy decided to build similar ships. Initial proposals called for a battleship equipped with eight 7.5 in (190 mm) guns to support the main battery, though under the direction of William Henry White, the Director of Naval Construction, these were replaced with four 9.2 in (234 mm) guns. The new ships, though based on the general Majestic type that had formed the basis of the preceding four battleship designs, marked the first significant change in the series. Like all late pre-dreadnoughts that entered service in the mid-1900s, Commonwealth was made almost instantaneously obsolescent by the commissioning of the all-big-gun HMS Dreadnought in December 1906, armed with a battery of ten heavy guns compared to the typical four of most pre-dreadnoughts.

Commonwealth was 453 feet 9 inches (138.30 m) long overall, with a beam of 75 ft (23 m) and a draft of 25 ft 8 in (7.82 m). The King Edward VII-class battleships displaced 15,585 to 15,885 long tons (15,835 to 16,140 t) normally and up to 17,009 to 17,290 long tons (17,282 to 17,567 t) fully loaded. Her crew numbered 777 officers and ratings. The King Edward VII-class ships were powered by a pair of 4-cylinder triple-expansion engines that drove two screws, with steam provided by sixteen water-tube boilers. The boilers were trunked into two funnels located amidships. The King Edward VII-class ships had a top speed of 18.5 knots (34.3 km/h; 21.3 mph) from 18,000 indicated horsepower (13,000 kW).

Commonwealth had a main battery of four 12-inch (305 mm) 40-calibre guns mounted in twin-gun turrets fore and aft. These were supported by a heavy secondary battery of four 9.2 in (234 mm) guns in four single turrets, two on each broadside. The ships also mounted ten 6-inch (152 mm) 45-calibre guns mounted in casemates, in addition to fourteen 12-pounder 3 in (76 mm) guns and fourteen 3-pounder 47 mm (1.9 in) guns for defence against torpedo boats. As was customary for battleships of the period, she was also equipped with five 18-inch (457 mm) torpedo tubes submerged in the hull; two were on each broadside, with the fifth in the stern.

Commonwealth had an armoured belt that was 9 inches (229 mm) thick; the transverse bulkheads on the aft end of the belt was 8 to 12 in (203 to 305 mm) thick. The sides of her main battery turrets were also 8 to 12 in thick, atop 12 in barbettes, and the 9.2 turrets had 5 to 9 in (127 to 229 mm) sides. The casemate battery was protected with 7 in (178 mm) of armour plate. Her conning tower had 12-inch-thick sides. She was fitted with two armoured decks, 1 and 2.5 in (25 and 64 mm) thick, respectively.

== Service history ==
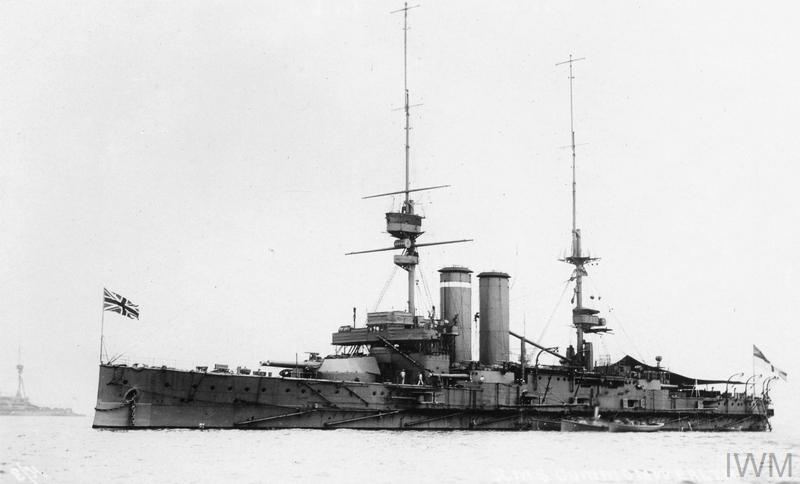
Commonwealth

=== Pre-First World War ===
HMS Commonwealth was built at Fairfield Shipbuilding and Engineering Company at Govan. She was laid down on 17 June 1902, was launched on 13 May 1903, and was completed in March 1905. Upon completion, HMS Commonwealth was delivered to Portsmouth Dockyard on 14 March, where she was placed in reserve. She went into full commission on 9 May at Devonport Dockyard for service in the Atlantic Fleet. She collided with the battleship HMS Albemarle near Lagos on 11 February 1907, sustaining hull and bulkhead damage; Albemarle suffered minor damage to her bow. She began repairs at Devonport Dockyard later that month. While under repair, Commonwealth transferred to the Channel Fleet in March, recommissioning for actual service with that fleet on 28 May after completion of her repairs. She suffered another mishap in August when she ran aground, and was under repair at Devonport Dockyard until October.

Under a fleet reorganization on 24 March 1909, the Channel Fleet became the 2nd Division, Home Fleet, and Commonwealth became a Home Fleet unit in that division. She underwent a refit at Devonport from October 1910 to June 1911. As a result of another fleet reorganization in May 1912, Commonwealth and all seven of her sisters (Africa, Britannia, Dominion, Hibernia, Hindustan, King Edward VII, and Zealandia) were assigned to form the 3rd Battle Squadron, assigned to the Home Fleet. The squadron was detached to the Mediterranean in November because of the First Balkan War (October 1912 – May 1913); it arrived at Malta on 27 November and subsequently participated in a blockade by an international force of Montenegro and an occupation of Scutari. The squadron returned to the United Kingdom in 1913 and rejoined the Home Fleet on 27 June.

=== First World War ===
Map of the North Sea

Upon the outbreak of the First World War in August 1914, the 3rd Battle Squadron, at the time under the command of Vice Admiral Edward Bradford, was assigned to the Grand Fleet and based at Rosyth, where it was reinforced with the five Duncan-class battleships, It was used to supplement the Grand Fleet's cruisers on the Northern Patrol. On 6 August, the day after Britain declared war on Germany, elements of the Grand Fleet sortied to inspect the coast of Norway in search of a German naval base violating Norwegian neutrality. Commonwealth and the rest of the 3rd Battle Squadron provided distant support to the operation. No such base was found, and the ships returned to port the next day. On 14 August, the ships of the Grand Fleet went to sea for battle practice before conducting a sweep into the North Sea later that day and into 15 August. During sweeps by the fleet, she and her sisters often steamed at the heads of divisions of the far more valuable dreadnoughts, where they could protect the dreadnoughts by watching for mines or by being the first to strike them. On 2 November 1914, the squadron was detached to reinforce the Channel Fleet and was rebased at Portland. It returned to the Grand Fleet on 13 November 1914.

On 14 December, the 1st Battlecruiser Squadron, 2nd Battle Squadron, and accompanying cruisers and destroyers left port to intercept the German forces preparing to raid Scarborough, Hartlepool and Whitby. On the first reports of contact with German units on the morning of 16 December, the Grand Fleet commander, Admiral John Jellicoe, ordered Bradford to take the 3rd Battle Squadron to support the ships in contact at 10:00. Four hours later, they met the 1st and 4th Battle Squadrons, en route from Scapa Flow, though they failed to reach the German High Seas Fleet before the latter withdrew. The Grand Fleet remained at sea until late on 17 December, at which point the 3rd Battle Squadron was ordered back to Rosyth. Commonwealth and the rest of the squadron joined the Grand Fleet for another sweep into the North Sea on 25 December. The fleet returned to its ports two days later, having failed to locate any German vessels. Commonwealth thereafter went into dry dock for a refit that lasted until February 1915.

Commonwealth returned to the 3rd Battle Squadron in February 1915. Elements of the Grand Fleet went to sea repeatedly over the next few months. The 3rd Battle Squadron patrolled the central North Sea in company with the 3rd Cruiser Squadron from 10 to 13 March. The two units again went to sea to sweep the central North Sea from 5 to 8 April. A major fleet operation followed on 11 April, with the entire Grand Fleet sortieing for a sweep of the North Sea on 12 and 13 April. The squadrons returned to their ports on 14 April to replenish their fuel. Another such operation followed on 17 April, which also failed to find any German ships. The 3rd Battle Squadron returned to Rosyth late on 18 April. The fleet sortied again on 21 April, returning to port two days later. The 3rd Battle Squadron, joined by the 3rd Cruiser Squadron, patrolled the northern North Sea from 5 to 10 May, during which a German U-boat attacked the battleships but failed to score a hit.

Another sweep into the North Sea took place on 17–19 May, and no German forces were encountered. The fleet went to sea again on 29 May for a patrol south to the Dogger Bank before returning to port on 31 May, again without having located any German vessels. The Grand Fleet spent much of June in port conducting training, but the most modern units went to sea on 11 June for gunnery practice to the northwest of Shetland. While they were training, Commonwealth and the rest of the 3rd Battle Squadron, along with the 3rd Cruiser Squadron, patrolled the central North Sea. Fleet activities were limited in July, owing to a threatened strike by coal miners, which began on 18 July and threatened the supply of coal for the fleet's ships. The strike continued into August, which led Jellicoe to continue to limit fleet activities to preserve his stocks of coal.

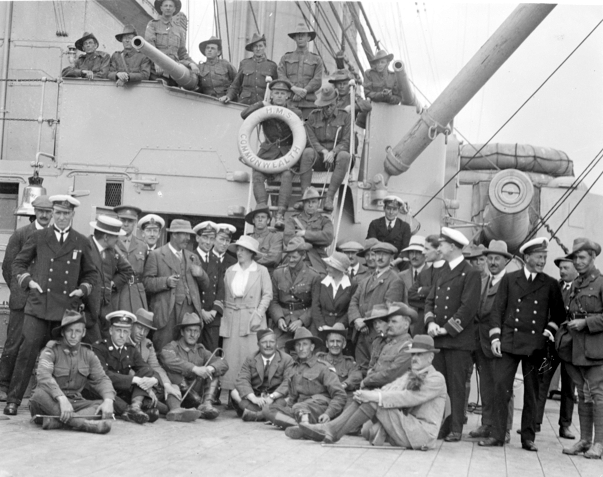
Australian soldiers touring HMS Commonwealth in 1919

The fleet saw little activity in September, and during this period, the Grand Fleet began to go to sea without the 3rd Battle Squadron. On 29 April 1916, the 3rd Battle Squadron was rebased at Sheerness, and on 3 May 1916 it was separated from the Grand Fleet, being transferred to the Nore Command. Commonwealth remained there with the squadron until August 1917. Commonwealth left the 3rd Battle Squadron in August 1917 and paid off to undergo an extensive refit at Portsmouth Dockyard, during which she became the only King Edward VII-class ship fitted with updated features common among dreadnoughts, including torpedo bulges, a tripod foremast, and a director and fire control system; she also had her 6-inch gun batteries removed and four 6-inch guns installed one deck higher.

When her refit was completed in April 1918, she was in effect the most advanced pre-dreadnought battleship in the world. She recommissioned on 16 April 1918 for service on the Northern Patrol, then transferred to the Grand Fleet on 21 August 1918, where she made full use of her updated equipment in service as a seagoing gunnery training ship based at Invergordon. After three years of this service as a training ship, Commonwealth paid off in February 1921. She was placed on the disposal list at Portsmouth Dockyard in April 1921 and was sold to Slough Trading Company for scrapping on 18 November 1921. She then was resold to German scrappers and towed to Germany to be broken up.
