= Crawford Maclachlan =

Royal Navy Admiral (1867–1952)

Admiral Crawford Maclachlan, CB (11 July 1867 – 21 April 1952) was a Royal Navy officer.

== Biography ==
The son of George Maclachlan of Maclachlan, Crawford Maclachan was born in Edinburgh and entered the Royal Navy in 1880. He took part in the Anglo-Egyptian War and was promoted to lieutenant in 1890. He specialized in navigation and became known as an able navigation officer. He served in China in 1900, and later became navigation officer of HMS Exmouth, the flagship of Admiral of the Fleet Sir Arthur Knyvet Wilson, Commander-in-Chief, Home Fleet.

He commanded HMS Scylla from 1907 to 1909, being promoted to the rank of captain in 1908. Whilst in command of Scylla, his skiff capsized off St Johns, Antigua; he managed to right her and, with water up to his waist, drifted for two days, on one occasion being washed overboard and attacked by sharks, before being found and rescued. In June 1909, he was appointed to the command of HMS Andromeda, and in September 1909 he was given command of HMS Hibernia, which he held until October 1910. In 1910, he served on an Admiralty committee appointed to consider the question of the berthing accommodation for His Majesty's ships in the dockyards and other waters. He was captain of HMS Lion from September to November 1911, of HMS Indomitable from November 1911 to February 1912, and of HMS Sirius from February 1912 to 1913, recommissioning her for service in the Atlantic.

In June 1914, he was given command of the battleship HMS King Edward VII, the flagship of Vice-Admiral Sir Edward Bradford. He was in command when she was sunk by a German mine on 6 January 1916. All of the crew bar one man were saved. Maclachlan was the last to leave the ship, boarding the destroyer Nessus at 16:10. He was then given command of HMS Royal Oak the same month, and commanded her at the Battle of Jutland in 1916. After the battle, he acted as flag captain to Admiral of the Fleet Sir Cecil Burney, who had transferred his flag from HMS Marlborough until she was repaired. He was appointed a CB in June 1918.

Relinquishing command of Royal Oak in January 1919, he was promoted to rear-admiral in February 1920 and appointed Rear-Admiral, Reserve Fleet, Rosyth. In October 1921, he was appointed Rear-Admiral and Senior Naval Officer, Yangtze. He relinquished the appointment in 1923, was promoted to vice-admiral in 1925, and was placed on the retired list in 1926. He was promoted to admiral on the retired list in 1930.
