= 3rd Battle Squadron =

Former battleship formation of the Royal Navy

- Active: 1913–1945
- Country: United Kingdom
- Branch: Royal Navy
- Size: Squadron

The 3rd Battle Squadron was a naval squadron of the British Royal Navy consisting of battleships and other vessels, active from at least 1914 to 1945. The 3rd Battle Squadron was initially part of the Royal Navy's Home Fleet. During the First World War, the Home Fleet was renamed the Grand Fleet. During the Second World War, the squadron covered Atlantic convoys.

== History ==
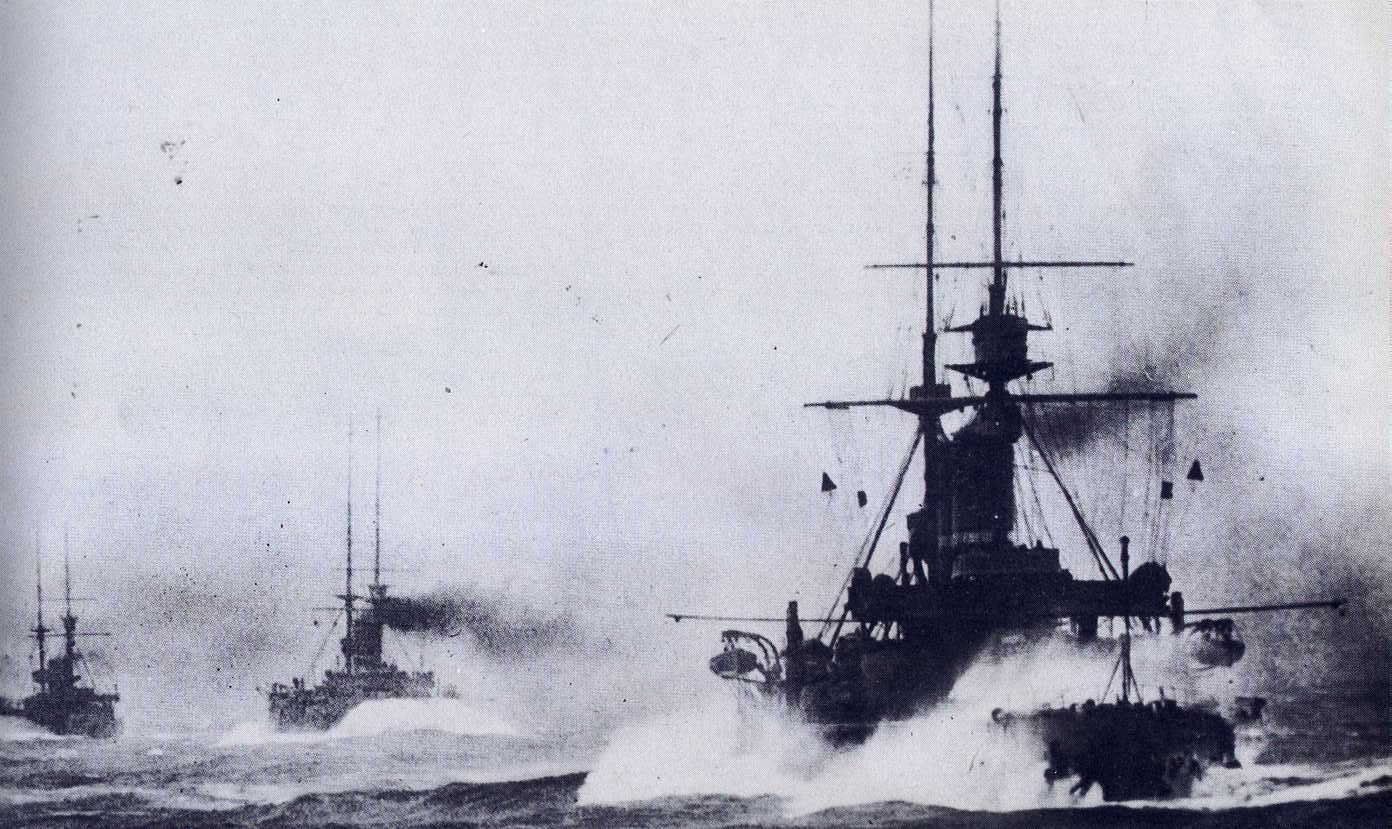
King Edward VII-class battleships on manoeuvres ca. 1909.

=== First World War ===
On 5 August 1914, the squadron had eight ships: King Edward VII, Africa, Britannia, Commonwealth, Dominion, Hibernia, Hindustan, and Zealandia. The squadron of eight King Edward VII-class pre-dreadnought battleships were nicknamed "the wobbly eight" after their slight tendency to roll under way.

The squadron was initially used as part of the Grand Fleet in support of the cruisers on the Northern Patrol. On 29 April 1916, the 3rd Battle Squadron was moved to Sheerness from Rosyth and came under the Nore Command in the Thames estuary. The move was intended to make more large ships available for coastal defence duties, after the Bombardment of Yarmouth and Lowestoft by German ships on 24 April 1916.

At the time of the Battle of Jutland, the squadron consisted of: Dreadnought (flagship of Vice-Admiral E. E. Bradford), Africa, Commonwealth, Hibernia, Dominion, Hindustan, Zealandia and Britannia, plus the protected cruiser Diamond. In addition the 3rd Cruiser Squadron, consisting of the armoured cruisers Antrim, Devonshire and Roxburgh, was attached, together with the destroyers Beaver, Druid, Ferret, Hind, Hornet, and Sandfly from the 1st Destroyer Flotilla, and Mastiff and Matchless from the 10th Destroyer Flotilla.

Essentially made obsolete by the introduction of the revolutionary battleship Dreadnought, and as battleships the world over began mimicking her design, the 3rd Battle Squadron played no role in the Battle of Jutland. The need for accompanying destroyers for these battleships was later given as the reason the Harwich destroyer squadron was also held back and took no part in the Jutland action.

Following the loss of King Edward VII in January 1916, Africa and Britannia served in the Mediterranean 1916–17. The remaining ships were augmented by Dreadnought from June 1916 onwards. Starting in November 1917, the 3rd Battle Squadron progressively shrank in size as its predreadnoughts were gradually detached for other duties.

The squadron, consisting by now of Dreadnought alone, was disbanded on 20 April 1918.

=== Second World War ===
At the start of the Second World War, the squadron formed part of the Channel Force and comprised just two ships:

- Rear Admiral L. E. Holland;
  - Resolution - Captain C. H. Knox Little;
  - Revenge - Captain E. R. Archer.

Later in the war, the squadron was based at Halifax, Nova Scotia. Rear Admiral, Third Battle Squadron, was responsible for covering Atlantic convoys; and was later to become the North Atlantic Escort Force. At the time, German surface raiders were a distinct concern, thus the allocation of battleships. RMS Ascania—an armed merchant cruiser—was part of the squadron during this period. Seaborn—a Fleet Air Arm base was established at RCAF Station Dartmouth in September 1940. Seaborn was to provide a shore base with administrative and maintenance facilities for the Swordfish and Walrus aircraft assigned to ships of the Third Battle Squadron.

In 1942, the Third Battle Squadron, now comprising;

- Vice Admiral W. E. C. Tait;
  - Resolution - Captain A. R. Halfhide;
  - Ramillies - Captain D. N. C. Tuffnell;
  - Revenge - Captain L. V. Morgan;
  - Royal Sovereign Captain R. H. Portal;

sailed for the Far East and became part of the Eastern Fleet. The squadron formed part of Force B. Facing the superior striking force of the Japanese Kido Butai carrier striking force during the 1942 Indian Ocean raid, the slow component of the Eastern Fleet—including the battleships of Force B—was withdrawn all the way back to Kilindini in East Africa to avoid their destruction at Japanese hands. Hermes—Force B's sole aircraft carrier—was detached and destroyed near Ceylon.

In 1945, the Squadron consisted of two battleships, Queen Elizabeth and the Free French Richelieu, as well another two escort carriers, four cruisers and six destroyers. Two battleships and escort carriers formed part of the covering force for Operation Dracula, the retaking of Rangoon. Vice-Admiral H.T.C. Walker commanded the squadron at the time.

== Admirals commanding ==
Commanders were as follows:

- Vice-Admiral Sir Cecil Burney (1912–13)
- Vice-Admiral Sir Lewis Bayly (1913–14)
- Vice-Admiral Sir Edward Bradford (1914–16)
- Vice-Admiral Sir John de Robeck (May–November 1916)
- Vice-Admiral Sir Herbert Heath (1916–17)
- Vice-Admiral Sir Dudley de Chair (1917–18)
- Rear-Admiral Sir Douglas Nicholson (April–October 1919)
- Rear-Admiral Hugh Watson (1924–25)
- Vice-Admiral Sir Michael Hodges April (1925–26)
- Rear-Admiral Francis Mitchell (March–May 1926)
- Rear-Admiral Roger Backhouse May (1926–27)
- Vice-Admiral Percival Hall-Thompson (1927–28)
- Rear-Admiral John Casement (1928–29)
- Rear-Admiral Henry Kitson (1929–30)
- Rear-Admiral George Hyde (1930–31)
- Rear-Admiral Lancelot Holland (1939–40)
- Rear-Admiral Stuart Bonham Carter (1940–42)
- Vice-Admiral Sir Algernon Willis (1942–43)
- Vice-Admiral Harold Walker (1944–45)

== Rear-Admirals Second-in-Command ==
Post holders included:

- Rear-Admiral Sir Christopher G. F. M. Cradock, 29 August 1911
- Rear-Admiral Cecil F. Thursby, 29 August 1912 – 29 August 1913
- Rear-Admiral Montague E. Browning, 29 August 1913
- Rear-Admiral Sydney R. Fremantle, 27 July 1915 – February, 1916
- Rear-Admiral Cecil F. Dampier, 13 March 1916 – 14 March 1917
- Rear-Admiral Douglas R. L. Nicholson, 13 March 1917 – 21 September 1917
- Rear-Admiral Sir Roger R. C. Backhouse, 5 May 1926 – 5 May 1927
- Rear-Admiral Lancelot E. Holland, 25 August 1939 – 29 December 1939
- Rear-Admiral Stuart S. Bonham-Carter, 1 January 1940 – 30 September 1941
