= Armstrong Whitworth 12-inch 40-calibre naval gun =

Type 41 12-inch 40-calibre BL 12-inch Mk IX gun
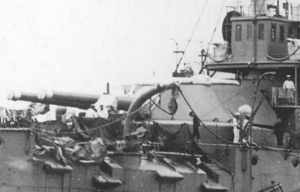
- Forward guns of Fuji
- Type: Naval gun
- Place of origin: United Kingdom, later licence-produced in Japan

Service history
- In service: 1900–1945
- Used by: Royal Navy; Imperial Japanese Navy; Regia Marina
- Wars: Russo-Japanese War; World War I

Production history
- Designer: Elswick Ordnance Company
- Designed: 1898
- Manufacturer: Elswick Ordnance Company; Vickers; Woolwich Arsenal

Specifications
- Mass: 49 long tons (50 t)
- Barrel length: 40-foot-5-inch (12.32 m) bore (40 calibres)
- Shell: 850 pounds (390 kg) separate charges and shell
- Calibre: 12 inches (305 mm)
- Breech: Welin interrupted screw
- Elevation: −5/+15 degrees
- Traverse: +150/−150 degrees
- Rate of fire: 1 round per minute
- Muzzle velocity: Japanese service : 2,400 ft/s (732 m/s); UK service: 2,481 ft/s (756 m/s), 2,612 ft/s (796 m/s) (King Edward VII class)
- Effective firing range: 15,000 yards (14 km); 15° elevation

The Armstrong Whitworth 12-inch naval gun of 40 calibres length was designed by and manufactured mainly by Armstrong's ordnance branch, Elswick Ordnance Company. It was intended for the Royal Navy's Royal Sovereign-class battleships, but budgetary constraints delayed their introduction. The first units were instead supplied to Japan. As the Type 41 12-inch (305 mm) 40-calibre naval gun it was the standard main battery on several early United Kingdom-built pre-dreadnought battleships of the Imperial Japanese Navy.

It later entered service with the RN as the 12-inch Mark IX, being fitted to warships of three pre-dreadnought classes prior to World War I. Also, during the war several guns were converted for use as railway guns, and, towards the end of the conflict, for use on the M-class submarine monitors.

The gun also saw service with the Italian Regia Marina, in two classes of pre-dreadnought battleships.

== Design and development ==
The Type 41 12-inch naval gun was produced by Armstrong Whitworth, Elswick, Newcastle upon Tyne, as a slightly modified version of the "EOC G pattern" 12-inch guns used on contemporary Royal Navy battleships.

== Japanese service ==
Japan purchased a total of 44 of these weapons for use on the four ships of the Fuji and Shikishima class, and the battleships Asahi and Mikasa. Each ship carried four guns in twin turrets.

In combat at the Battle of the Yellow Sea in the Russo-Japanese War, the Japanese battleships Asahi, Shikishima and Mikasa all had one of their main guns taken out of action due to premature bore detonations. The cause was traced to faulty fuses, and the problem was rectified prior to the Battle of Tsushima.

The gun was officially designated as "Type 41" from the 41st year of the reign of Emperor Meiji on 25 December 1908. It was further re-designated in centimetres on 5 October 1917 as part of the standardization process for the Imperial Japanese Navy to the metric system.

The Type 41 12-inch gun fired an 850-pound (390 kg) shell, with either an armour-piercing, high-explosive or general-purpose warhead.

== United Kingdom service ==
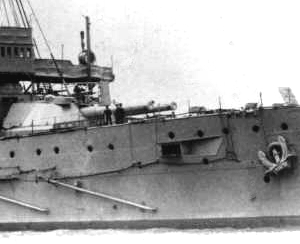
Forward guns of HMS Queen

=== Royal Navy service ===
The gun entered service with the Royal Navy as "BL 12 inch gun Mark IX" (Note: I.e. Mark 9 : Britain used Roman numerals to identify Marks (models) of its ordnance – this was the 9th 12-inch breech-loading naval gun in service with the Royal Navy) on the following ships :

- Formidable-class battleships: Three ships, laid down 1898 and mounting four guns each.
- London-class battleships: Five ships, laid down in 1898–1901 and mounting four guns each.
- Duncan-class battleships: Six ships laid down 1899, each mounting four guns.
- King Edward VII-class battleships of 1904. Five of the eight ships of this class (HMS King Edward VII, HMS Commonwealth, HMS Hindustan, HMS Dominion and HMS New Zealand) carried the Mark IX gun.

==== M-class submarine mounting ====
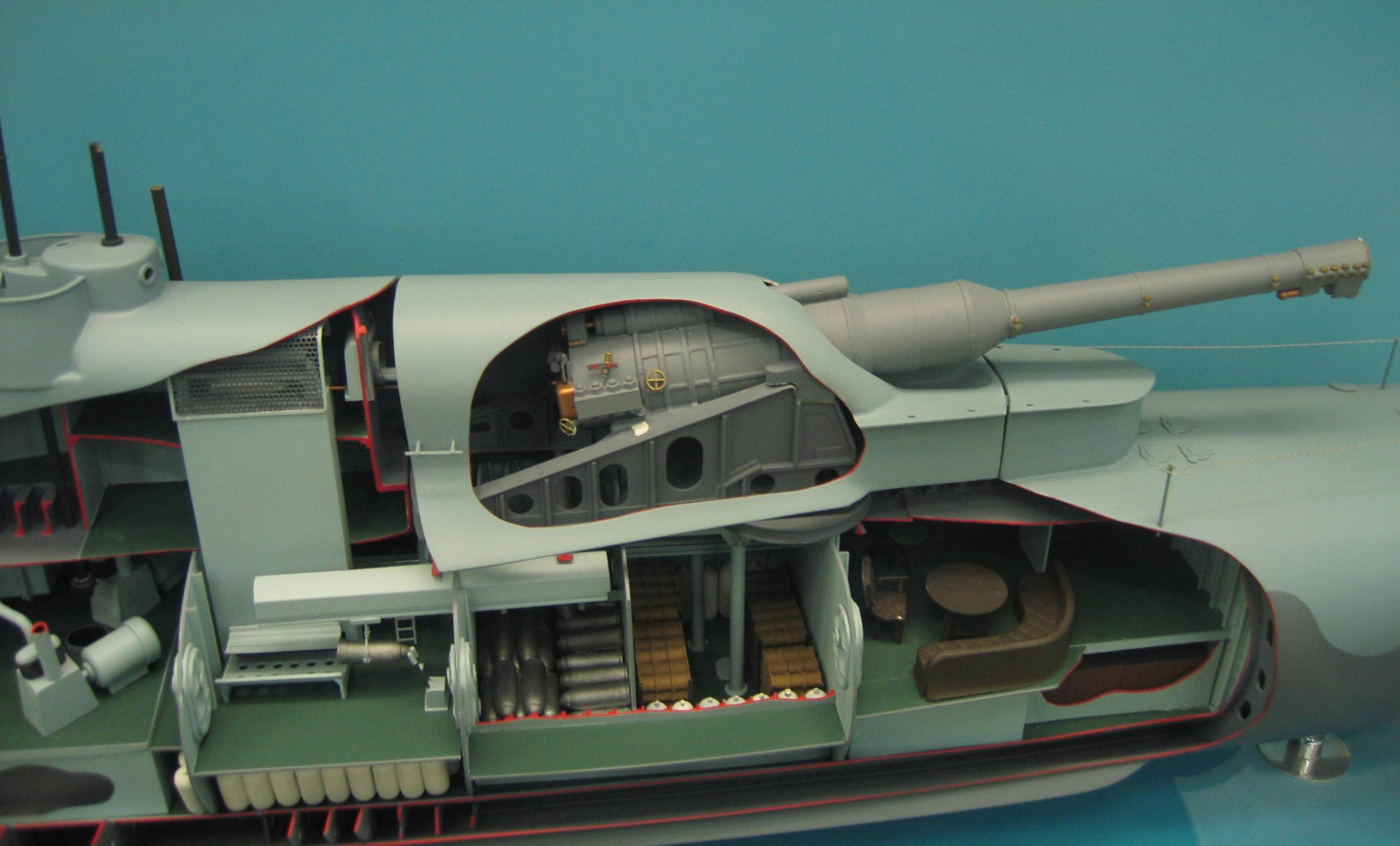
Sectioned model showing mounting on submarine HMS M1

The gun was in service mounted on the three M-class submarines. HMS M2 and M3 had their guns removed in 1927–28.

=== Railway gun ===
Four guns were mounted on railway carriages and used by the British army in World War I on the Western Front.

=== United Kingdom ammunition ===
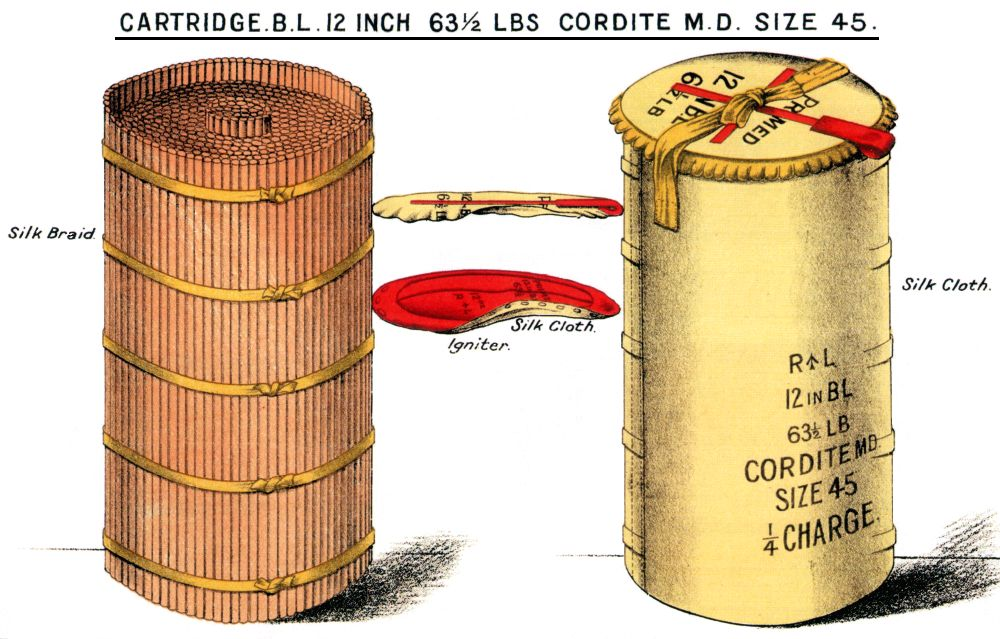
Cartridge 63½ lb (¼ charge), Cordite M.D. used on King Edward VII-class battleship

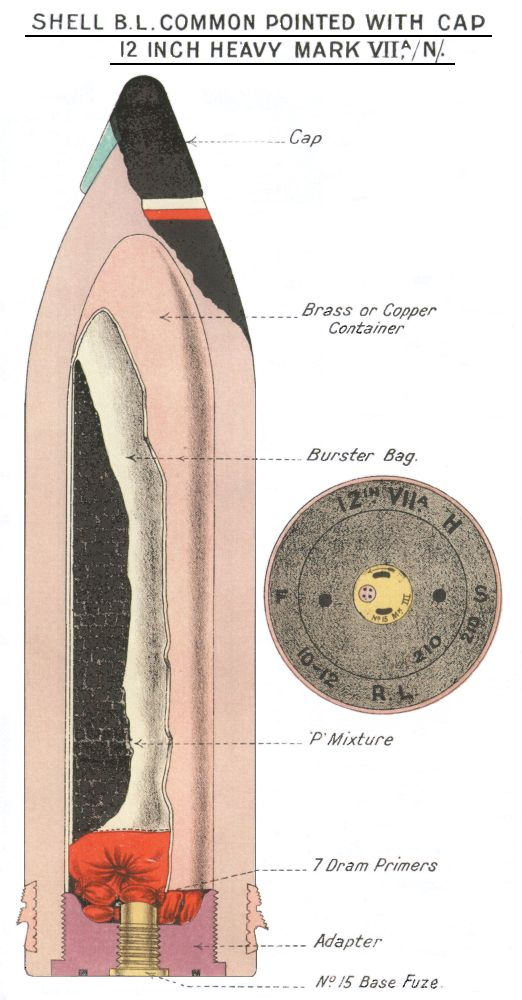
Common pointed capped shell, 1912

== Italian service ==
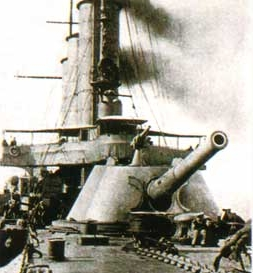
Fitted to Vittorio Emanuele

Armstrongs also sold versions of their 12-inch 40-calibre gun to Italy to arm the two Regina Margherita-class (commissioned 1905) and the four Regina Elena-class battleships (commissioned 1908). The version for the Regina Elena class fired a heavier 417 kg (919 lb) shell. The Regina Margheritas were lost during the war, the Regina Elenas scrapped after the war.

== See also ==
- List of naval guns

=== Weapons of comparable role, performance and era ===
- 305 mm/40 Modèle 1893/1896 French equivalent
- Russian 12-inch 40-caliber naval gun Russian equivalent

== Bibliography ==
- Text Book of Gunnery. London: His Majesty's Stationery Office. 1902. Archived from the original on 16 February 2012.
- Brown, D. K. (2003). Warrior to Dreadnought: Warship Development, 1860–1905. Book Sales. ISBN 1-84067-529-2.
- Brown, D. K. (2003). The Grand Fleet: Warship Design and Development, 1906–1922. Caxton Editions. ISBN 978-1-84067-531-3.
- Friedman, Norman (2011). Naval Weapons of World War One: Guns, Torpedoes, Mines and ASW Weapons of All Nations; An Illustrated Directory. Barnsley: Seaforth Publishing. ISBN 978-1-84832-100-7.
- Gardiner, Robert; Lambert, Andrew, eds. (2001). Steam, Steel and Shellfire: The Steam Warship, 1815–1905. Conway's History of the Ship. Book Sales. ISBN 978-0-7858-1413-9.
- Hodges, Peter (1981). The Big Gun: Battleship Main Armament, 1860–1945. United States Naval Institute Press. ISBN 0-87021-917-0.
- Parkes, Oscar (1990) [1957]. British Battleships. United States Naval Institute Press. ISBN 1-55750-075-4.
- DiGiulian, Tony. "Britain 12"/40 (30.5 cm) Mark IX". NavWeaps.com.
