= Edward Bradford (Royal Navy officer) =

Royal Navy Admiral (1858–1935)

Admiral Sir Edward Bradford GCB GBE CVO
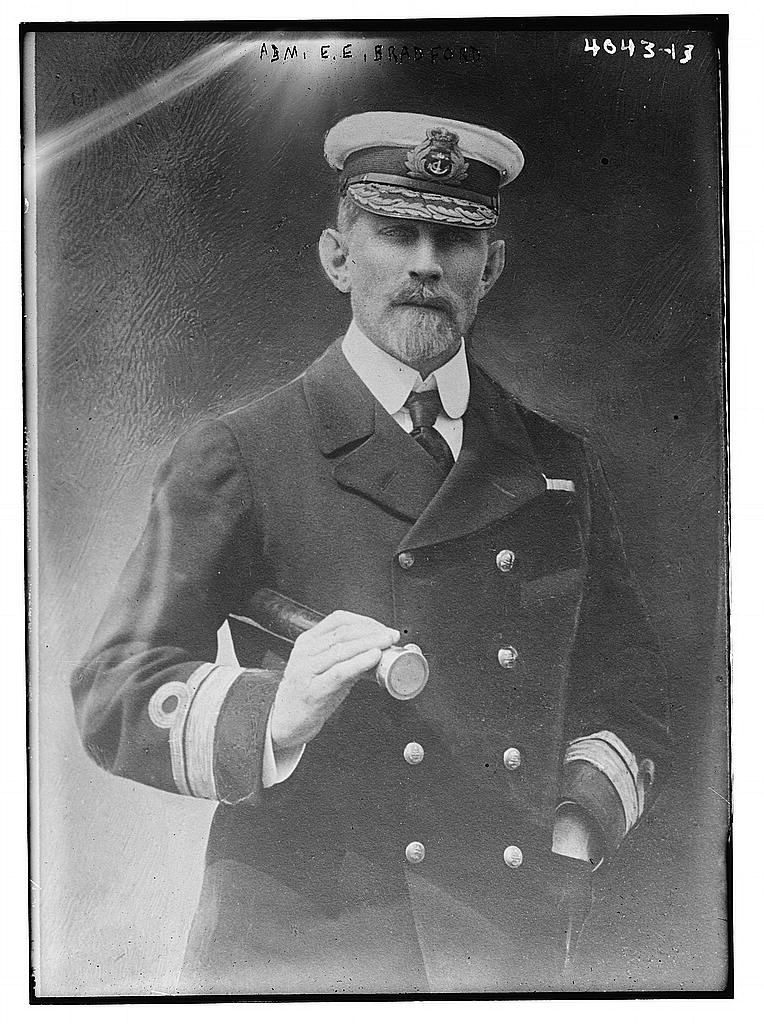
- Bradford in 1916
- Born: 10 December 1858
- Died: 25 November 1935 (aged 76)
- Military career
- Allegiance: United Kingdom
- Branch: Royal Navy
- Rank: Admiral
- Conflicts: 1882 Anglo-Egyptian War; Battle of Dogger Bank (1915)
- Awards: K.C.B, G.B.E., C.V.O.

Sir Edward Eden Bradford (10 December 1858 – 25 November 1935) was a British naval officer, who commanded the 3rd Battle Squadron of the Grand Fleet until May 1916. He wrote the biography of Admiral of the Fleet Arthur Knyvet Wilson.

== Early career ==
Edward Eden Bradford joined the Royal Navy as a cadet in 1872, serving on the modern ironclad battleships Hercules, Monarch, and Sultan in the Channel Fleet. He was promoted to Midshipman in 1876, and served aboard the screw-frigate Doris, the screw-corvette Danae and the iron screw-frigate Raleigh. It was during this time that he passed his lieutenant's exam on 14 November 1878.

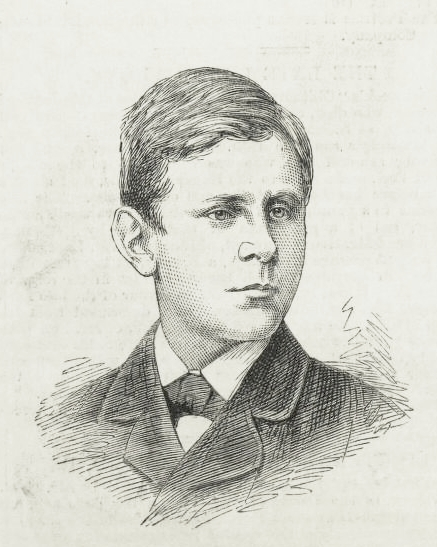
Bradford in 1881

Bradford was then appointed sub-lieutenant on the survey schooner Sandfly. In October 1880, whilst surveying ashore in the Solomon Islands, the Sandfly's commanding officer, Lieutenant Bower, and five crewmen were murdered by the natives. Bradford took charge of the Sandfly, recovered the bodies of his shipmates, and punished the natives by burning their village. This earned him a special promotion to Lieutenant in December 1880.

Bradford joined the old ironclad Achilles from 1881 to 1883 and took part in the 1882 Anglo-Egyptian War for which he was decorated.

He served in the China Station from 1883 to 1891 aboard the screw-corvette Sapphire and the screw-sloop Mutine. During his time on the Mutine, he was made acting-commander, on 20 January 1891.

In 1886, Bradford won the Royal United Services Institute's silver medal award for his essay, The Maritime Defence of the United Kingdom (including its Colonies and Dependencies), and its Trade, in a War with a Great Maritime Power, which was published in the R.U.S.I. journal.

From 1894 to 1896, Bradford served on Boadicea, flagship of the East Indies Squadron as commander.

Bradford married his wife Sheila in June 1896.

== Captain ==
Bradford was promoted to captain on 30 June 1899. In March 1900 he was posted to HMS President, home of the London division of the Royal Naval Reserve, for transport service in Thames District. He had an essay published entitled Remarks on Organisation and Coaling in 1900.

Bradford served under Admiral Sir Arthur Knyvet Wilson as his flag-captain in the modern battleships Majestic, Revenge and Exmouth. He wrote a Life of Admiral of the Fleet published in 1923.

Bradford was Commodore of Chatham Naval Barracks from 1907 to 1908.

== Admiral ==
Bradford was then made Rear-Admiral of the Home Fleet, with his flag in the King Edward VII-class battleship Hibernia.

He then commanded the Training Squadron aboard the armoured cruiser Leviathan from 1911 to 1913.

Bradford was promoted to vice-admiral on 10 February 1914, and given command of the 3rd Battle Squadron, flying his flag in the battleship King Edward VII. The 3rd Battle Squadron supported Admiral Beatty at Dogger Bank and left the Grand Fleet in May 1916.

Bradford was awarded the KCB in the 1916 New Year Honours.

== Retirement ==
At his own request, Bradford retired in 1918 with the rank of admiral.

Bradford was awarded the G.B.E. on 1 January 1930.

== See also ==
- The UK National Portrait Gallery has both a bromide print and a negative of Admiral Bradford taken in 1917 by the photographer Walter Stoneman (1876–1958).
- The National Maritime Museum has a water colour of Admiral Bradford by the artist Francis Dodd.
- Admiral Bradford's papers were presented to the National Maritime Museum in 1991 by his daughter Miss Katherine Bradford. "They mainly relate to Bradford's earlier career and include detailed log books and journals from 1873 to 1883, official progress certificates, reports, etc, as well as letters and reminiscences."
