= Stubbington House School =

Coordinates: 50.82560°N 1.21406°W

Location
- Bagshot Road; Ascot, Berkshire, SL5 9JU; United Kingdom

Information
- Type: Preparatory school
- Established: 1841
- Founder: William Foster
- Closed: 1997
- Local authority: 903 Pre LGR (1998) Berkshire
- Department for Education URN: 110116 Tables
- Gender: Initially Boys, later Mixed
- Age: 2 to 13

Stubbington House School was founded in 1841 as a boys' preparatory school, originally located in the Hampshire village of Stubbington, around 1 mile (1.6 km) from the Solent. Stubbington House School was known by the sobriquet "the cradle of the Navy". The school was relocated to Ascot in 1962, merging with Earleywood School, and it closed in 1997.

== History ==
Donald Leinster-Mackay, an academic researcher into the history of education, has said that "No school had stronger ties with the Royal Navy in the nineteenth century than Stubbington House." The school was founded in 1841 by the Reverend William Foster, who had been born around 1802 and was an alumnus of Trinity College, Cambridge. He had married Laura, a daughter of Rear-Admiral John Hayes, and it is probable that this accounts for the connection with the navy that the school developed. Another factor affecting its primary purpose was the introduction in 1838 of an entrance examination for the Royal Navy: although initially an undemanding test for most, this decision encouraged the development of specialised educational establishments, of which Stubbington House was a very early example. In addition, Hampshire has a historically close connection to the navy, and the closure of the Royal Naval College at Portsmouth in 1837, together with the deployment of HMS Britannia as a cadet training ship proved to be timely.

The original building was "a square Queen Anne house with a mid Georgian façade of 5 bays and 3 storeys in grey brick with red dressing and an open pedimented porch". It was situated in around 50 acres (20 ha) of parkland, of which half was used by the school. The building had been constructed around 1715, supposedly with proceeds from contracts to supply the army and navy. In due course, it was extended to meet the demands of the school as the number of pupils increased. The site eventually included two separate sanatoria facilities, (Note: Even possessing a single sanatorium was a pioneering development at the time.) as well as a gymnasium and various other structures.

Beginning with 10 pupils, the school had around 40 a few years later, and 21 in 1871. William Foster died while away from home at Leamington in 1866. He was succeeded by one of his sons, Montagu Henry Foster, (Note: Hampshire County Council says that Laura, the wife of William Foster, ran the school for seven years after his death and that her own death then caused control to pass to her son, Montagu; a court report of 1883 says that Montagu took over on the death of his father. Leinster-Mackay agrees with the court report but puts the year as 1865.) (Note: Montagu Henry Foster had at least one elder brother: the death of Major W. J. Foster, the eldest son, was announced in The Times in November 1910. The youngest daughter of William and Laura Foster, Mary Caroline Foster, married Arthur Percy Douglas. Douglas was himself involved with the Royal Navy and became Under Secretary for Defence, New Zealand, 1895–1903, as well as being the fifth baronet of the Douglas of Carr line.) and by 1883 the school roll had increased to around 130 pupils. This increase is in part attributable to the efforts of Montagu's brother, the Reverend Courtenay Foster, who opened a department to train boys for entry to the army via Woolwich and Sandhurst, for which aim the boys stayed at the school for a longer time. Charlotte Mitchell, a senior lecturer in English Literature, has analysed surviving bank statements of Charlotte Mary Yonge, the writer. Mitchell has speculated that payments made by Yonge to a Mr Foster may relate to school fees for one of her nephews, Maurice Yonge, who was at Stubbington House when the 1881 census was taken. There were payments in 1880 of £59 12s. 8d. and £59 11s. 9d., followed in 1881 by payments of £61 13s. 5d. and £60 2s. 1d. Finally, in 1882, there was a payment of £66 0s. 2d.

Montagu Foster was involved in legal action on at least two occasions during his headmastership. In 1883 he lost an action brought by a former master that related to constructive dismissal, during the proceedings of which several witnesses commented on the lack of discipline at the school. Subsequently, in 1897, The British Medical Journal reported that he had successfully sued a parent in relation to monies owing for out-of-term care of a pupil who had fallen ill. He also found his school among a handful that were subjected to criticism by the Association of Preparatory School Headmasters, who, in 1901, were successful in persuading the Admiralty that the official recognition of this small number as naval entrance examination centres gave an unfair advantage.

The school uniform around this period was "... an Eton type jacket with long sleeves and a waistcoat. [The] trousers were black and grey striped—long or short according to age. Caps bearing the MHF (Montagu Henry Foster) school badge were worn. In winter bowlers were worn for church with boaters in the summer."

Montagu died in April 1913, leaving an estate that was valued at £163,140. According to Alumni Cantabrigienses, his son, Montagu Richard William Foster (1870–1935), had taken over as headmaster in 1903 and continued in that role until 1928, the same year that he received a knighthood. However, Leinster-Mackay says that the change of office took place at the time of Montagu's death in 1913. (Note: Montagu Henry Foster had at least four sons: General Sir Richard Foster (1879–1965) was, like his brother, educated at Stubbington, and Lieutenant Archibald Courteney Hayes Foster was killed in action in British East Africa on 20 September 1914. There was also at least one daughter: the engagement to be married between Fanny Elizabeth Foster and Captain J. L. Jackson, RAMC was announced in February 1918.)

Montagu junior had been born and educated at the school, and subsequently he had taken his degree at Trinity College, Cambridge. He had taken over running the army department upon the early death of his uncle, Courtenay, but closed it in 1913 and thus reduced the school roll by around 50 pupils. Changes in government policy, which came about primarily because of the escalating naval rivalry between Britain and Germany, also affected the school population. A reduction in numbers came with the closure of the Britannia cadet training facility, causing pupils to leave at an earlier age for the Royal Naval College at Osborne House on the Isle of Wight. The outcome of these changes was that there were 77 pupils in 1913.

The Foster family line of ownership and headmastership continued with Hugh Richard Montagu Foster, who took over from his father in 1928. In 1930, the school was advertising that it had 130 pupils, and Hugh continued in charge until near to his own death in July 1959. Hugh's obituarist in The Times noted that this was the end of the male line, although there were plans to continue the school, and that

The school was pre-eminent in passing boys into the Royal Navy, and, in the days when Hugh Foster's grandfather ruled there, it could claim as former pupils perhaps 30 or 40 per cent of the successful candidates for the Senior Service, apart from those boys who went into the Army and, in later years, the Royal Air Force.

The arrangement of the business was adjusted in 1958 with the creation of a charitable trust but the Foster family remained as owners until 1963, paying a headmaster to run the school. A combination of death duties demanded from the family and also the high cost of maintaining the buildings caused the school to move to Ascot in 1962. There it merged with the long-established Earleywood School before subsequently closing on 7 July 1997. A limited company, Stubbington House Earleywood Limited, had been formed in 1963.

A few of the school buildings still remain in Stubbington, although most became derelict within a year of them being sold to Fareham Council, for £97,000, in 1962. The main school house was demolished in 1967. The site and the surviving buildings are now a community centre. There is a memorial to the family in the 12th-century Rowner Parish Church of St Mary the Virgin, PO13 9SU.

== Notable alumni ==
=== A to D ===
- Harry Barron, army officer, Governor of Tasmania and Governor of Western Australia
- Bryan Bertram Bellew, Irish peer
- Lord Charles Beresford Baron Beresford, Commander-in-Chief, Mediterranean Fleet and Member of Parliament for Marylebone, Woolwich and Portsmouth
- Dallas G. M. Bernard, baronet
- Vivian Henry Gerald Bernard, admiral who took part in the Battle of Jutland
- Richard Bevan, Royal Navy officer
- Andrew Bickford, Commander-in-Chief, Pacific Station
- Henry Blagrove, naval officer, killed in the destruction of HMS Royal Oak during the Second World War
- Richard Boyle, 6th Earl of Shannon, peer and politician in the Legislative Assembly of the Northwest Territories
- Harold Briggs, Member of Parliament for Manchester Blackley
- Paul Bush, Commander-in-Chief, Cape of Good Hope Station
- Houston Stewart Chamberlain, political philosopher, racialist, expert on Wagner and inspirer for National Socialist ideology
- Neville Francis Fitzgerald Chamberlain, army officer, Inspector General of the Royal Irish Constabulary and inventor of snooker
- Archibald Cochrane, (1874–1952), Rear-Admiral
- Stanley Colville, Commander-in-Chief, Portsmouth
- Sir C. Preston Colvin, administrator of colonial railways in Burma and India
- Ragnar Colvin, Commander-in-Chief of the Royal Australian Navy
- John Gregory Crace, naval officer
- Andrew Cunningham, 1st Viscount Cunningham of Hyndhope, Commander-in-Chief, Mediterranean Fleet, First Sea Lord, Lord High Commissioner to the General Assembly of the Church of Scotland and Lord High Steward
- John H. D. Cunningham, Commander-in-Chief, Levant, Commander-in-Chief, Mediterranean Fleet and First Sea Lord
- Peter Danckwerts, George Cross winner and Shell Professor of Chemical Engineering
- Hubert Edward Dannreuther, naval officer
- Gerald Charles Dickens, naval officer
- Angus Douglas-Hamilton, army officer and posthumous winner of the Victoria Cross

=== E to K ===
- Sydney Marow Eardley-Wilmot, rear-admiral and writer who was knighted in 1908; son of Sir John Eardley-Wilmot, 2nd Baronet
- Bolton Eyres-Monsell, 1st Viscount Monsell, naval officer, Member of Parliament for Evesham, Chief Whip and First Lord of the Admiralty
- George Eyston, British racing driver and land speed record holder
- Tony Fasson, naval officer and George Cross winner
- Eric Fellowes, 3rd Baron Ailwyn, naval officer and peer
- Humphrey Osbaldston Brooke Firman, naval officer and Victoria Cross winner
- Douglas Fisher, Admiral and Fourth Sea Lord
- Maurice Swynfen Fitzmaurice, Director of Naval Intelligence, Commander-in-Chief, Africa Station and musician
- Launcelot Fleming, naval chaplain, Bishop of Portsmouth, Bishop of Norwich and Dean of Windsor
- Richard Foster, son of headmaster Montagu Henry Foster, Adjutant-General Royal Marines and later colonel of the East Surrey Regiment
- Wilfred French, naval officer
- Cyril Fuller, Commander-in-Chief, North America and West Indies Station, Second Sea Lord and Chief of Naval Personnel
- Herbert Arthur Stevenson Fyler, admiral
- John Gaimes, submarine commander, died in HMS K5
- Bryan Godfrey-Faussett, naval officer and courtier
- Somerset Gough-Calthorpe, Commander-in-Chief, Mediterranean Fleet and Commander-in-Chief, Portsmouth
- Heathcoat Salusbury Grant, admiral
- William Lowther Grant, Commander-in-Chief, China Station and Commander-in-Chief, North America and West Indies Station
- Anthony Griffin, Controller of the Navy
- George Grogan, army officer and Victoria Cross winner
- Vernon Haggard, Commander-in-Chief, North America and West Indies Station
- Guy Hallifax, naval officer and founder of the Seaward Defence Force, South Africa
- Lionel Halsey, naval officer and courtier
- Misan Harriman (born 1977), photographer and founder of What We Seee. Chair of trustees of the Southbank Centre. Film-maker.
- Henry Harwood, commander at the Battle of the River Plate, Commander-in-Chief, Mediterranean Fleet and Commander-in-Chief, Levant
- Lanoe George Hawker, airman and Victoria Cross winner
- Godfrey Herbert, a naval officer and submariner who was involved with the ill-fated K-boats and accused of war crimes as a result of the Baralong Incidents
- Frank Hopkins, Commander-in-Chief, Portsmouth
- Henry Horan, Commander-in-Chief, New Zealand Division
- Philip Hunloke, Olympic sailor and courtier
- Patrick Huskinson, President of the Air Armaments Board and designer of Blockbuster bombs
- Edward Fitzmaurice Inglefield, naval officer and Secretary to Lloyd's of London
- Henry Bradwardine Jackson, Admiral of the Fleet and First Sea Lord during much of the First World War
- William George Elmhirst Ruck Keene, admiral and commander of Britannia Royal Naval College
- Mark Kerr, Commander in Chief of the Royal Hellenic Navy, founder of the Royal Air Force and Deputy Chief of the Air Staff
- Herbert King-Hall, Commander-in-Chief, Cape of Good Hope Station

=== L to R ===
- Edward Vere Levinge, Lieutenant-Governor of Bihar and Orissa
- Arthur Longmore, Inspector General of the RAF and seaplane pioneer
- Hubert Lynes, Rear Admiral and a noted ornithologist who was a Fellow of several learned societies
- Anthony Cecil Capel Miers, submariner and Victoria Cross winner
- Alexander Mountbatten, 1st Marquess of Carisbrooke, Prince of Battenberg and grandson of Queen Victoria
- Henry Gerard Laurence Oliphant, naval commander in the Battle of Dover Strait (1916)
- William Nicholson, Third Sea Lord and Controller of the Navy
- William Pain, army officer, Commissioner of the Royal Irish Constabulary and Member of Parliament for South Londonderry
- William Christopher Pakenham, Commander-in-Chief, North America and West Indies Station and Bath King of Arms
- George Patey, Commander-in-Chief, North America and West Indies Station
- Lawrence Pattinson, AOC Flying Training Command
- Frederick Peake, army officer known as Peake Pasha
- Arthur Peters, naval officer
- Tom Phillips, Commander-in-Chief, China Station, commander of Force Z, killed on HMS Prince of Wales
- Robert Prendergast, naval officer
- Lionel Preston, Admiral and Fourth Sea Lord
- Thomas Prickett, AOC Transport Command and Air Member for Supply and Organisation
- Robert Poore, cricketer for South Africa and army officer
- Henry Rawlings, Commander-in-Chief, West Africa, Commander-in-Chief, Mediterranean Fleet and commander of Task Force 57
- Felix Ready, Quartermaster-General to the Forces
- David Renton, Baron Renton, Member of Parliament for Huntingdonshire, Minister of State at the Home Office and Deputy Speaker in the House of Lords
- John Phillips Rhodes, baronet and Member of Parliament for Stalybridge and Hyde
- Frank Rose, Commander-in-Chief, East Indies Station
- Charles Ross, army officer
- Guy Royle, naval officer, secretary to the Lord Great Chamberlain and Yeoman Usher of the Black Rod
- William Ruck-Keene, admiral

=== S to Z ===
- Robert Falcon Scott, naval officer and Antarctic explorer
- Hugh Sinclair, known as Quex, Director of British Naval Intelligence, head of SIS and GCHQ
- Ewen Southby-Tailyour, Royal Marines Officer, Yachtsman and Author
- Geoffrey Spicer-Simson, naval officer
- Aubrey St Clair-Ford, baronet
- John Miles Steel, AOC RAF Bomber Command and AOC RAF Home Command
- Edward Neville Syfret, Commander-in-Chief, Home Fleet and commander of Force H
- John Ellis Talbot, British Conservative politician, Member of Parliament for Brierley Hill
- Ernest Augustus Taylor, naval officer and Member of Parliament for Paddington South
- Evelyn Thomson, naval officer
- Ion Tower, naval officer
- Beachcroft Towse, soldier, Victoria Cross winner, courtier and campaigner for the blind
- Sir Humphrey de Trafford, 4th Baronet, army officer and race horse owner
- Rudolph de Trafford, baronet, army officer and banker
- Charles Vaughan-Lee, naval officer
- Arthur Waistell, Commander-in-Chief, China Station, Commander-in-Chief, Portsmouth
- Algernon Walker-Heneage-Vivian, served in the defence at Ladysmith, became an admiral and, in 1926, High Sheriff of Glamorgan
- Humphrey T. Walwyn, naval officer and Governor of Newfoundland
- Andrew Gilbert Wauchope, army officer and politician, killed at the Battle of Magersfontein
- John Baker White, spy, journalist and Member of Parliament for Canterbury
- Sir William Wiseman, 10th Baronet, intelligence agent and investment banker
- Edmund Walter Hanbury Wood, Member of Parliament for Stalybridge and Hyde
- Sandy Woodward, Commander-in-Chief, Home Fleet and Falklands Battle Group Commander
- Algernon Yelverton, 6th Viscount Avonmore, Irish nobleman

== See also ==
- Burney's Academy
- Eastman’s Royal Naval Academy
