= Richard Webb (Royal Navy officer) =

Royal Navy Admiral (1870-1950)

Admiral Sir Richard Webb KCMG CB
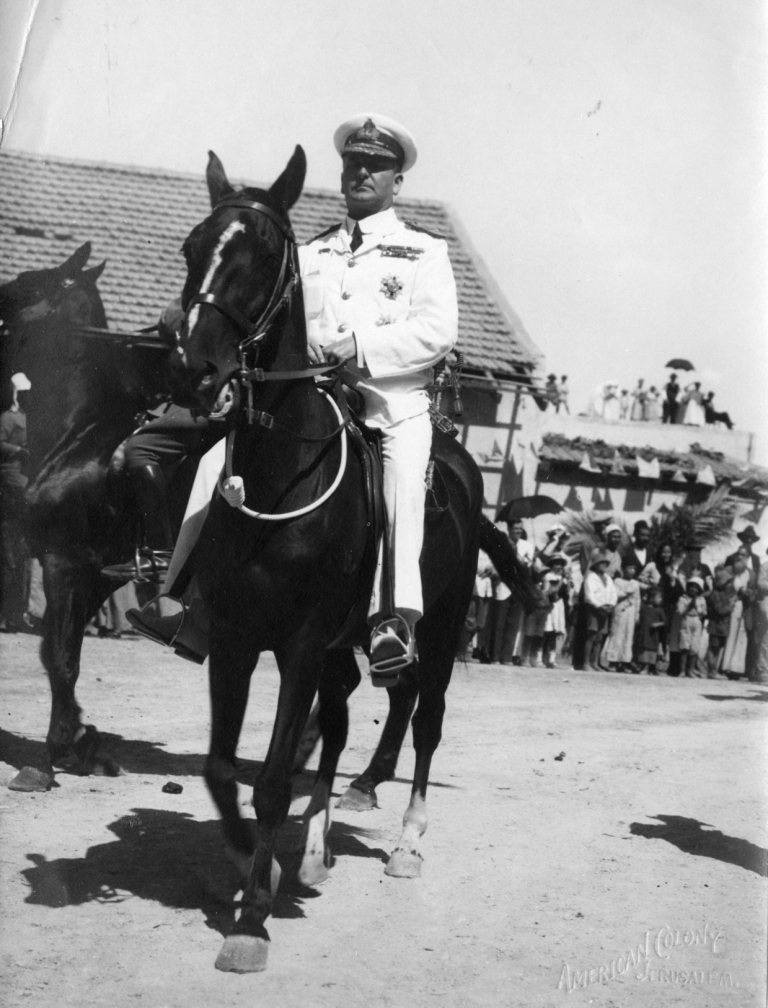
- Admiral Webb riding in Jaffa, 1920
- Born: 20 July 1870
- Died: 20 January 1950 (aged 79)
- Military career
- Allegiance: United Kingdom
- Branch: Royal Navy
- Rank: Admiral
- Commands: HMS Amethyst; HMS Illustrious; HMS New Zealand; Royal Naval College, Greenwich
- Awards: Knight Commander of the Order of St Michael and St George; Companion of the Order of the Bath

Admiral Sir Richard Webb KCMG CB (20 July 1870 – 20 January 1950) was a British Royal Navy officer.

== Early life and career ==
Webb was born in Holt, Norfolk, England. He joined the Royal Navy as a Naval Cadet in July 1883. As a Midshipman, he served in the battleship HMS Alexandra, alongside Midshipman David Beatty and several other future admirals, and then the corvette HMS Carysfort, both in the Mediterranean. He was commissioned Sub-Lieutenant in December 1889 and promoted lieutenant in December 1891.

In July 1895 he qualified as a gunnery officer and then served as a gunnery officer in the battleships HMS Magnificent with the Channel Fleet and HMS Ramillies in the Mediterranean. On 1 January 1902 he was promoted commander, and in June that year joined the cruiser HMS Ariadne, flagship of the North America and West Indies Station. In July 1905 he transferred to her successor, HMS Royal Arthur and in May 1906 to her successor, HMS Euryalus.

== Command ==
In January 1907, Webb was promoted captain and joined the staff of the Royal Naval War College in Portsmouth. In January 1909 he was given command of the light cruiser HMS Amethyst on the North America station. In 1911 he returned to the War College as flag captain to Vice-Admiral Sir Henry Jackson. In 1913 he briefly commanded the battleship HMS Illustrious, flagship of the 7th Battle Squadron. In August 1913 he was posted to the Admiralty in London and on the outbreak of the First World War in 1914 he was appointed Director of the Trade Division of the Naval Staff. In this capacity he was responsible for liaison with the Merchant Marine, the naval blockade of Germany, and the control of neutral shipping. For his services he was appointed Companion of the Order of the Bath (CB) in the 1915 New Year Honours.

In October 1917, Webb took command of the battlecruiser HMS New Zealand with the Grand Fleet. In September 1918 he was promoted Rear-Admiral and was appointed Assistant High Commissioner at Constantinople. For his services in Turkey he was appointed Knight Commander of the Order of St Michael and St George (KCMG) in the 1920 New Year Honours. In September 1920 he was posted to the Mediterranean Fleet as Rear-Admiral 4th Battle Squadron and Second-in-Command of the Fleet. He served in the Mediterranean until 1922.

In June 1924 he was promoted vice-admiral. He headed the Naval Mission to Greece from November 1924 to May 1925, and in February 1926 he was appointed president of the Royal Naval College, Greenwich and flag officer commanding the War College. He was promoted admiral in January 1928 and retired in February the following year.

== Honours ==
Webb was also appointed Order of the Rising Sun 3rd Class in 1917, Commander of the Order of the Crown of Italy in 1918 and Grand Commander of the Greek Order of the Redeemer and Commandeur of the French Légion d'honneur in 1919. He was a naval aide-de-camp to the King from May 1917 to September 1918.

== Sources ==
- Obituary, The Times, 21 January 1950

Military offices
Preceded by Sir George Hope	President, Royal Naval College, Greenwich; 1926–1929	Succeeded by John McClintock
