= Naval War College (disambiguation) =

The Naval War College is the staff college for the United States Navy in Newport, Rhode Island.

Naval War College may also refer to:

- Naval War College, Goa, India
- Naval War College (Japan)
- Naval War College (South Korea)
- Pakistan Naval War College
- Royal Naval War College
