= Matthew Best =

Matthew Best may refer to:

- Matthew Best (Royal Navy officer) (1878–1940), British navy officer
- Matthew Best (conductor) (1957–2025), English bass singer and conductor, especially of vocal music
