= Lionel Wells =

Admiral Sir Lionel Wells KCB DSO
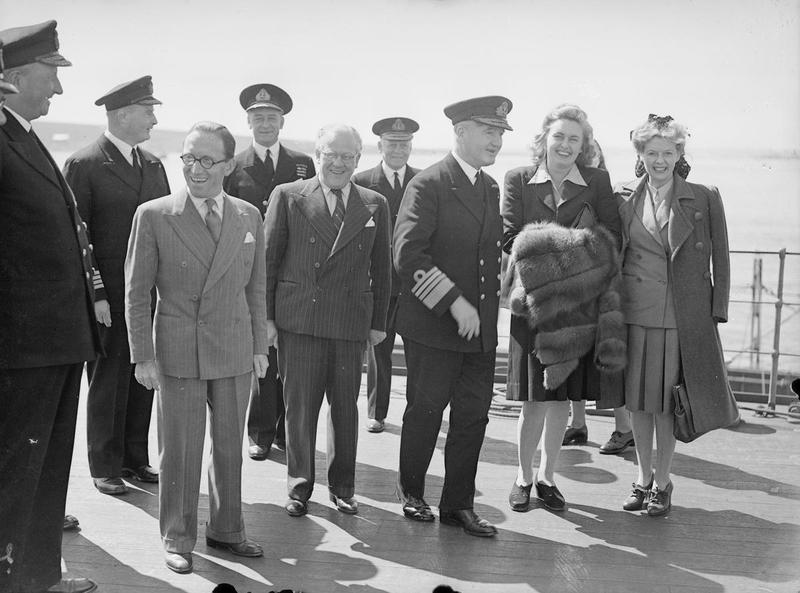
- Wells (back row) in July 1943
- Born: 28 November 1884; West Bromwich, Staffordshire, England
- Died: 22 April 1965 (aged 80)
- Military career
- Allegiance: United Kingdom
- Branch: Royal Navy
- Rank: Admiral
- Commands: HMS Diomede; HMS Eagle; Orkneys and Shetlands Command
- Conflicts: World War I World War II
- Awards: Knight Commander of the Order of the Bath; Distinguished Service Order

Admiral Sir Lionel Victor Wells, KCB, DSO (28 November 1884 – 22 April 1965) was a Royal Navy officer who became Admiral Commanding, Orkneys and Shetlands.

== Naval career ==
Wells joined the Royal Navy as a cadet on 15 September 1899. As a midshipman, he was posted to the battleship HMS Majestic in January 1901. He was promoted to lieutenant on 15 March 1905, and captain on 31 December 1924, and he was given command of the cruiser HMS Diomede in 1929. He joined the staff at the Royal Naval War College in 1931 and became captain of the aircraft carrier HMS Eagle in 1933 before going on to be Director of the Tactical School in 1935 and Rear-Admiral 3rd Carrier Squadron in 1937. He served in the Second World War as Vice-Admiral, Aircraft Carriers, from 1939 and as Admiral Commanding, Orkneys and Shetlands from January 1943 before retiring in 1944.

Military offices
Preceded by Sir Hugh Binney	Admiral Commanding, Orkneys and Shetlands; January 1943 – October 1943	Succeeded by Sir Henry Harwood
