= Admiral Commanding, Orkneys and Shetlands =

Operational commander of the Royal Navy

- Active: (1914–1920), (1939–1945)
- Country: United Kingdom
- Branch: Royal Navy
- Type: Naval formation
- Garrison/HQ: Lyness

The Admiral Commanding, Orkneys and Shetlands was an operational commander of the Royal Navy. He was charged with the administration of the Orkney and Shetland Islands and operating and defending the fleet base at Scapa Flow that was the main anchorage for both the Home Fleet and Grand Fleet at various times.

== History ==
An Admiral Commanding for the Orkneys and Shetlands was appointed twice, on the outbreak of war, to provide for the defence and administration of the main base for the Home Fleet. The Admiral Commanding was responsible, under the orders of the Commander-in-Chief, Home Fleet, for administration of naval defences, naval establishments, and shore duties generally in Orkney and Shetland.

During the First World War and the Second World War the Rear-Admiral, Scapa Flow served under him, with a position similar to that of an Admiral Superintendent of a dockyard port. Directly under his orders were the Northern Patrol, Shetlands Patrols, the Officer Commanding Troops Orkney, the Officer Commanding Troops Shetlands, the Admiralty Port Officer Kirkwall, the Rear-Admiral commanding the local minefields and the officers responsible for the extended defences, the local defence flotilla and the Orkney Trawler Patrols. He was responsible for the patrolling of the area from Wick to Cape Wrath.

Shore establishments included HMS Pyramus (shore establishment) at Kirkwall; HMS Proserpine (shore establishment) at Lyness; and HMS Fox (shore establishment) at Lerwick.

During the Second World War the Rear-Admiral, Scapa Flow continued to serve under him.

== First World War ==
Included:

| | Rank | Flag | Name | Term |
|---|---|---|---|---|
Admiral Commanding Orkneys and Shetland
| 1 | Admiral | Admiral - Royal Navy | Sir Stanley Cecil James Colville | 7 September 1914 – 19 January 1916 |
| 2 | Admiral | Admiral - Royal Navy | Sir Frederic Edward Errington Brock | 20 January 1916 – 11 March 1918 |
| 3 | Admiral | Admiral - Royal Navy | Sir Herbert E. King-Hall | 28 January 1918 – 1 March 1919 |
| 4 | Vice-Admiral | Vice-Admiral - Royal Navy | Sir Robert John Prendergast | 1 March 1919 – 9 January 1920 |

=== Subordinate commanders First World War ===
Source:

=== Flag Officer Scapa Flow/Rear Admiral Scapa ===
This officer's role was similar to that of Admiral Superintendent of a dockyard port.

| | Rank | Flag | Name | Term |
|---|---|---|---|---|
Flag Officer Scapa Flow/Rear Admiral Scapa
| 1 | Rear-Admiral | Rear-Admiral - Royal Navy | Francis Miller | September 1914 – April, 1916 January 1916 |
| 2 | Rear-Admiral | Rear-Admiral - Royal Navy | Robert Prendergast | May 1916 – September 1917 1918 |

=== Flag Officer Shetlands ===
| | Rank | Flag | Name | Term |
|---|---|---|---|---|
Flag Officer Shetlands
| 1 | Rear-Admiral | Rear-Admiral - Royal Navy | Rear Admiral Clement Greatorex | October 1917 |

=== Naval units, First World War ===
Included:

| Unit | Date | Notes |
|---|---|---|
| 21st Minesweeper Flotilla | 1918 | |
| Northern Patrol | 1914–1918, 1939–1945 | Operating within the Orkneys & Shetland Command under VAdm Comm NP |
| Scapa Local Defence Flotilla | 1914–1918 | |

== Second World War ==
Watson lists the 6th M/S Flotilla 7.41 – 12.42, which may have been under direct command of the Home Fleet, and the 15th M/S Flotilla 4.42 – 2.44 [Bangors] operated under the orders of the Admiral Commanding. The Admiral's flag was flown aboard HMS Iron Duke in Scapa Flow.

The Northern Patrol was based within the Orkney and Shetlands area, but was not responsible to the Admiral Commanding Orkneys and Shetlands. Its ships were dispersed by 1941.

Admirals Commanding:

| | Rank | Flag | Name | Term |
|---|---|---|---|---|
Admiral Commanding Orkneys and Shetland
| 1 | Vice-Admiral | Vice-Admiral - Royal Navy | Sir Wilfred Franklin French | July 1939 – 20 December 1939 |
| 2 | Vice-Admiral | Vice-Admiral - Royal Navy | Sir Hugh Binney | 20 December 1939 – 7 January 1942 |
| 3 | Vice-Admiral | Vice-Admiral - Royal Navy | Sir Lionel Wells | 7 January – October 1943 |
| 4 | Vice-Admiral | Vice-Admiral - Royal Navy | Sir Henry Harwood | April 1944 – March 1945 |

=== Flag Officer, Scapa Flow/Rear-Admiral Scapa ===
| | Rank | Flag | Name | Term |
|---|---|---|---|---|
Flag Officer Scapa Flow/Rear Admiral Scapa
| 1 | Rear-Admiral | Rear-Admiral - Royal Navy | Patrick Macnamara | 1 September 1940 – March 1945 |

=== Admiral-superintendent Lyness ===
| | Rank | Flag | Name | Term |
|---|---|---|---|---|
Admiral Superintendent Lyness
| 1 | Rear-Admiral | Rear-Admiral - Royal Navy | Patrick Macnamara | 3 October 1940 – March 1945 |

=== Admiral-superintendent Orkney ===
| | Rank | Flag | Name | Term |
|---|---|---|---|---|
Admiral Superintendent Orkney
| 1 | Rear-Admiral | Rear-Admiral - Royal Navy | Patrick Macnamara | 1 May 1942 – March 1945 |
