= Patrick Macnamara =

Royal Navy officer (1886–1957

Rear-Admiral Sir Patrick Macnamara KBE CB
- Born: 11 January 1886
- Died: 4 April 1957 (aged 71)
- Military career
- Allegiance: United Kingdom
- Branch: Royal Navy
- Rank: Rear-Admiral
- Commands: HMS Effingham; HMS Nelson
- Conflicts: First World War; Second World War
- Awards: Knight Commander of the Order of the British Empire; Companion of the Order of the Bath

Rear-Admiral Sir Patrick Macnamara (11 January 1886 – 4 April 1957) was a Royal Navy officer.

== Naval career ==
Educated at Bradfield College and the training ship HMS Britannia, Macnamara joined the Royal Navy in January 1901. He served as gunnery officer in the battlecruiser HMS Tiger during the First World War. Promoted to captain on 30 June 1925, he was given command of the cruiser HMS Effingham in October 1927 and then the battleship HMS Nelson in September 1933 before retiring in 1936. He was recalled in 1939, promoted to rear-admiral and served as Flag Officer, Scapa Flow throughout the Second World War.

He was advanced to Knight Commander of the Order of the British Empire on 13 June 1946.
