= Octavius Douglas-Hamilton =

Maj.-Gen. Octavius Douglas-Hamilton (1821-1904) was the son of Lieutenant Augustus Barrington Price Anne Powell Hamilton and Maria Catherine Hyde, a grandson of Admiral Charles Powell Hamilton and Lucretia Prosser. He was born on 15 February 1821 in Boulogne, France.

The family surname was changed to Douglas-Hamilton in 1875.

Octavius Douglas-Hamilton was commissioned in 1839 in 2nd Bengal European Cavalry. He served in the Punjab Campaign in 1848 and 1849, and at the Siege of Delhi in 1857, and the actions at Hindon and Basil-Ka-Serai.

He retired in 1875 and was granted the honorary rank of Major General.

He was married to Katharine Augusta Westenra Macleod (b. ca 1822, d. 30 Nov 1902), dau. of Capt Donald Macleod CB RN. They were the parents of Major Angus Falconer Douglas-Hamilton, V.C.

He died on 14 Aug 1904 at 46 Marylands Road, Paddington, London, England.
