= Hugh Binney =

Royal Navy Admiral (1883–1953)

Admiral Sir Hugh Binney KCB KCMG DSO
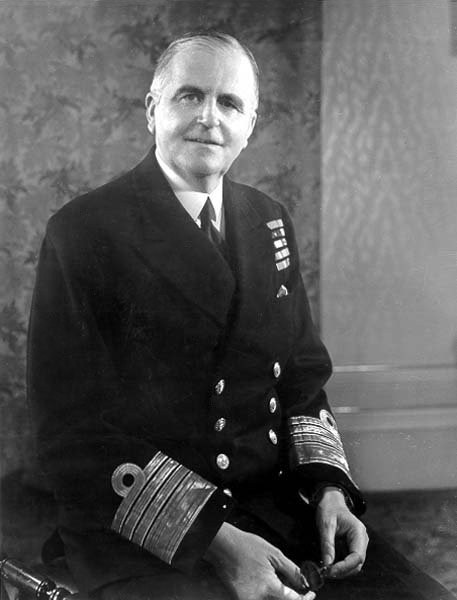

16th Governor of Tasmania
- In office 24 December 1945 – 8 May 1951
- Monarch: George VI
- Premier: Robert Cosgrove; Edward Brooker
- Preceded by: Sir Ernest Clark
- Succeeded by: Sir Ronald Cross

Personal details
- Born: Thomas Hugh Binney; 9 December 1883 Douglas, Isle of Man
- Died: 8 January 1953 (aged 69) Colchester, Essex

Military service
- Allegiance: United Kingdom
- Branch/service: Royal Navy
- Years of service: 1897–1944
- Rank: Admiral
- Commands: Orkneys and Shetlands (1939–42); Imperial Defence College (1939); 1st Battle Squadron (1936–38); HMS Hood (1932–33); HMS Nelson (1928–30); HMS Cardiff (1922–25)
- Battles/wars: First World War; Second World War
- Awards: Knight Commander of the Order of the Bath; Knight Commander of the Order of St Michael and St George; Distinguished Service Order

Admiral Sir Thomas Hugh Binney, KCB, KCMG, DSO (9 December 1883 – 8 January 1953) was a senior officer in the Royal Navy and the 16th Governor of Tasmania from 1945 to 1951.

== Early life ==
Binney was born in Douglas, Isle of Man on 9 December 1883, the son of Thomas Godfrey Binney and his wife, Susan Lockhart.

== Naval career ==
Binney was determined to pursue a career with the Royal Navy from an early age, and he joined the training vessel HMS Britannia at Dartmouth at the age of 13.

He served at sea from 1899 until 1914, and was then aboard HMS Queen Elizabeth as a gunnery officer for the Dardanelles Campaign. Binney had been promoted to the rank of Commander by 1916, and was awarded the Distinguished Service Order in 1919. He was made Captain whilst on the China Station in 1922. He became deputy director of plans at the Admiralty in 1925. He went on to be Flag Captain on HMS Nelson in 1928, Captain of HMS Hood in 1932 and Chief of Staff to Commander-in-Chief, Plymouth in 1933.

Promoted to Rear Admiral in 1934, he became commander of the 1st Battle Squadron, Mediterranean Fleet in 1936. When the Second World War broke out, he was Commandant of the Imperial Defence College in London. He became Flag Officer, Orkneys and Shetlands in December 1939 and was promoted to admiral in 1942. He then served as flag officer-in-charge, in Cardiff before retiring from the navy in 1944.

== Governor of Tasmania ==
Following his retirement from the navy, Hugh Binney was chosen to replace Ernest Clark as Governor of Tasmania, a post he took up on 24 December 1945. He excelled at the post, and was a popular governor. Despite this, his governorship was not a quiet one. He oversaw the Robert Cosgrove government forced to call an early election in 1948 due to the Legislative Council rejecting the supply bill. He again dissolved the second Cosgrove government in 1950 due to the retirement of speaker of the house, W.G. Wedd, in protest at the appointment of Thomas D'Alton as Agent General for Tasmania.

The Binneys both engaged themselves in the Tasmanian way of life, and were both involved in many social organisations. Hugh Binney was a member of the Royal Yacht Club of Tasmania, and won the Derwent Sailing Pennant in 1951. He retired as governor on 8 May 1951 and immediately returned to England.

== Later life ==
Hugh Binney was made a Companion of the Order of the Bath (CB) in 1935, and was elevated to Knight Commander of the Order of the Bath (KCB) in 1940. He married Elizabeth Bride Blair-Imrie, a granddaughter of Brigadier General Eyre Macdonell Stewart Crabbe, at the parish church of St Martin-in-the-Fields, London on 31 October 1942, but they were never to have children. She excelled in the role of governor's wife. Sir Hugh Binney was elevated to Knight Commander of the Order of St Michael and St George in 1951, and following surgery for cholecystitis, he died of pulmonary embolism on 8 January 1953.

His grave lies in the churchyard of St Mary the Virgin, Tollesbury, Essex.

Military offices
Preceded by Sir Arthur Longmore	Commandant of the Imperial Defence College; 1939	Vacant Second World War Title next held by Sir William Slim
Preceded by Sir Wilfred French	Admiral Commanding, Orkneys and Shetlands; 1939–1942	Succeeded by Sir Lionel Wells
Government offices
Preceded by Sir Ernest Clark	Governor of Tasmania; 1945–1951	Succeeded by Sir Ronald Cross
