= Angus Douglas-Hamilton =

Recipient of the Victoria Cross

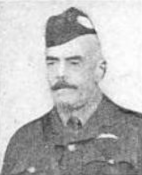
- Born: 20 August 1863; Brighton, East Sussex, UK
- Died: 26 September 1915 (aged 52); Loos, France
- Spouse: Anna Watson (m. 1894)
- Relatives: Major General Octavius Douglas-Hamilton (father)
- Military career
- Allegiance: United Kingdom
- Branch: British Army
- Service years: 1884–1915
- Rank: Lieutenant-colonel
- Units: Queen's Own Cameron Highlanders
- Conflicts: Mahdist War; World War I: Battle of Loos †
- Awards: Victoria Cross

Lieutenant-Colonel Angus Falconer Douglas-Hamilton VC (20 August 1863 – 26 September 1915) was a Scottish recipient of the Victoria Cross, the highest and most prestigious award for gallantry in the face of the enemy that can be awarded to British and Commonwealth forces.

== Life ==
Born at Brighton in 1863, he was the son of Major General Octavius Douglas-Hamilton and Katherine Macleod, and a great-great-grandson of Lt. Gen. James Douglas-Hamilton, 4th Duke of Hamilton and 1st Duke of Brandon. Douglas-Hamilton was educated at Foster's Naval Preparatory School, and latterly at the Royal Military College, Sandhurst.

He married Anna Watson on 1 August 1894.

Having been commissioned into the Queen's Own Cameron Highlanders in 1884, he served in the Sudan, Gibraltar, Malta, South Africa, North China, and India, attaining the rank of major by 1901. He retired in 1912, whilst remaining on the army's reserve list.

== First World War ==
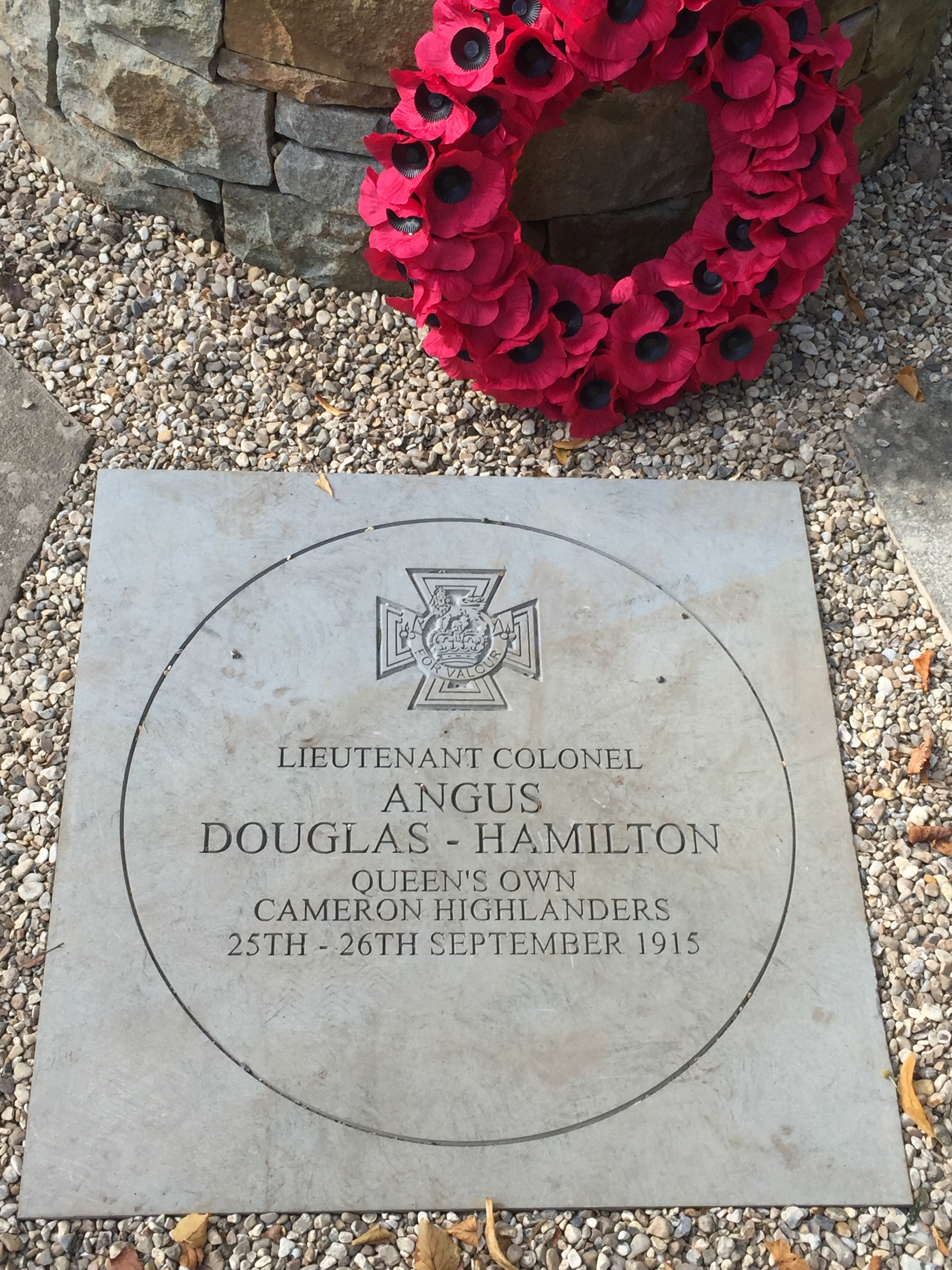

In August 1914, at the outbreak of the First World War, he was 50 years old. Recalled, and promoted to a temporary Lieutenant-Colonelcy in the Queen's Own Cameron Highlanders Reserve of Officers, British Army, commanding the 6th Battalion, the following deed took place for which he was awarded the VC.

On 25–26 September 1915 during operations on Hill 70 at the Battle of Loos, France, Lieutenant-Colonel Douglas-Hamilton, when the battalions on his right and left had retired, rallied his own battalion again and again and led his men forward four times. The last time he led all that remained, about 50 men, in a most gallant manner, and was killed at their head. It was due to his bravery, and splendid leadership that the line at this point was able to check the enemy's advance.

He is commemorated on the Loos Memorial.

== The medal ==
His Victoria Cross is displayed at the Regimental Museum of Queen's Own Highlanders (Seaforth and Camerons), Fort George, Inverness-shire, Scotland.
