= Grand Fleet =

First World War fleet of the Royal Navy

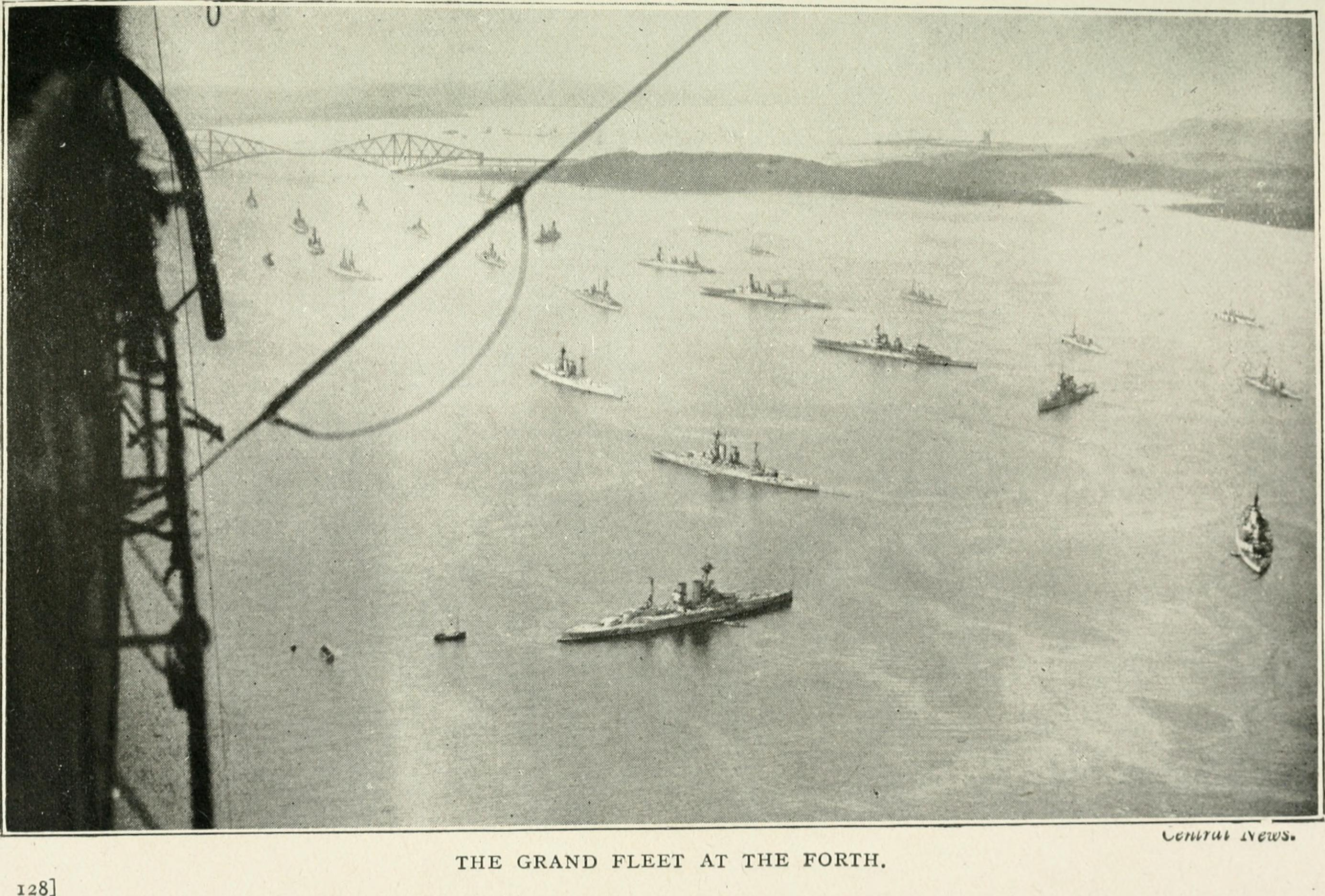
- The Grand Fleet in the Firth of Forth
- Active: 1914–1919
- Country: United Kingdom
- Branch: Royal Navy
- Type: Fleet
- Size: ~160 ships
- Engagements: Battle of Jutland

Commanders
- Commander-in-Chief 1914–1916: Sir John Jellicoe
- Commander-in-Chief 1916–1919: Sir David Beatty

The Grand Fleet was the main battlefleet of the Royal Navy during the First World War. It was established in August 1914 and disbanded in April 1919. Its main base was Scapa Flow in the Orkney Islands.

== History ==
Formed in August 1914 from the First Fleet and part of the Second Fleet of the Home Fleets, the Grand Fleet included 25–35 modern capital ships. It was commanded initially by Admiral Sir John Jellicoe.

The 10th Cruiser Squadron carried out the Northern Patrol between Shetland and Norway and cruisers from Cromarty and Rosyth operated a second line (and screened the fleet) in enforcing the blockade of Germany. The administrative complications of the distant blockade across the northern exits of the North Sea overwhelmed the capacity of Vice Admiral Francis Miller, the Base Admiral in Chief from 7 August 1914, devolving on the commander in chief, Admiral John Jellicoe. To relieve the administrative burdens on Miller and Jellicoe, the post of the Admiral of the Orkneys and Shetlands was created to oversee the defence of the islands, naval bases and shore duties. Vice-Admiral Stanley Colville was appointed to the command (7 September 1914 – 19 January 1916) with Miller under his authority. (Note: the Admiral of the Coast of Scotland was a separate authority which excluded the islands.)

Admiral Jellicoe was significantly concerned about the possibility of submarine or destroyer attacks on Scapa Flow. While the Grand Fleet spent almost the first year of the war patrolling the west coast of the British Isles, their base at Scapa was defensively reinforced, beginning with over sixty blockships sunk in the many entrance channels between the southern islands to enable the use of submarine nets and booms. These blocked approaches were backed by minefields, artillery and concrete barriers.

Admiral Jellicoe was succeeded by Admiral Sir David Beatty in December 1916.

The Grand Fleet was based first at Scapa Flow in the Orkney Islands, and later at Rosyth on the Firth of Forth. It participated with the biggest fleet action of the war – the Battle of Jutland – in June 1916. After the Battle of Jutland, the German High Seas Fleet rarely ventured out of its bases at Wilhelmshaven and Kiel in the last two years of the war to engage with the British fleet.

Following the German defeat, 74 ships of the High Seas Fleet (Hochseeflotte) of the Imperial German Navy (Kaiserliche Marine) were interned in Gutter Sound at Scapa Flow pending a decision on their future in the peace Treaty of Versailles. During April 1919 the Grand Fleet was disbanded, with much of its strength forming a new Atlantic Fleet. Most of the interned German warships were later scuttled by their crews despite Royal Navy attempts to save them on 21 June 1919.

== Order of battle ==
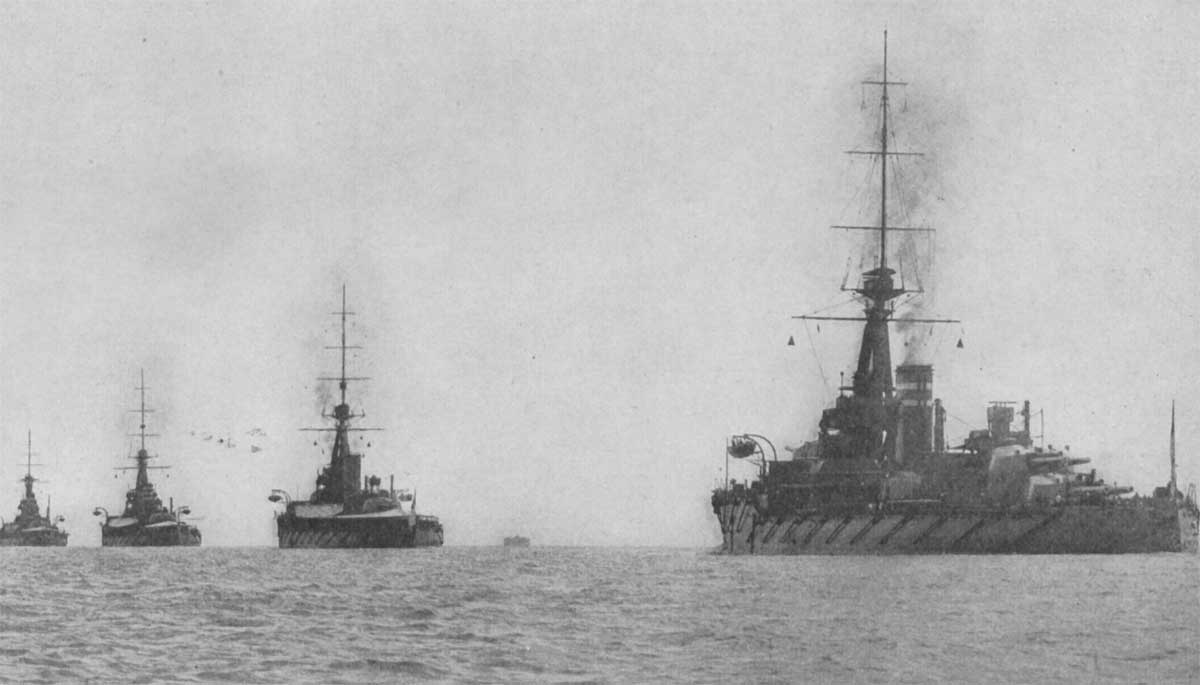
The 2nd Battle Squadron of the Grand Fleet in 1914. From left to right the ships are: King George V, Thunderer, Monarch and Conqueror.

Not all the Grand Fleet was available for use at any one time, because ships required maintenance and repairs. At the time of the Battle of Jutland in May 1916, it had 32 dreadnought and super-dreadnought battleships. Of these, 28 were in the order of battle at Jutland.

The actual strength of the fleet varied through the war as new ships were built and others were transferred or sunk but the number of battleships steadily increased, adding to the margin of superiority over the German fleet. After the USA joined the war, the US Battleship Division Nine was attached to the Grand Fleet as the Sixth Battle Squadron, adding four, later five, dreadnought battleships.

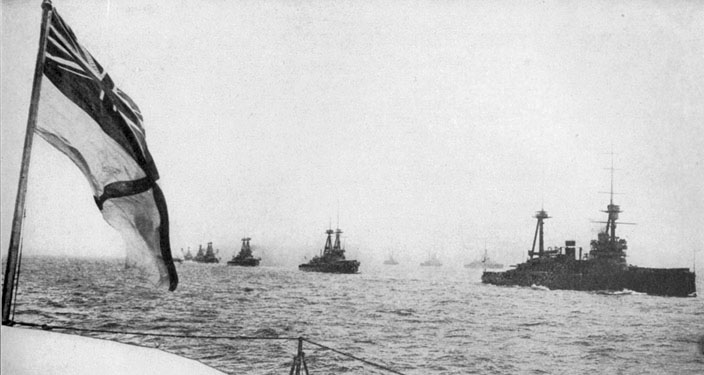
The Grand Fleet sailing in parallel columns during the First World War.

The order of battle of the Grand Fleet at the end of the war in 1918 included 35 dreadnought battleships and 11 battlecruisers. (Note: Two of these were the very lightly armoured Courageous-class battlecruiser.) Twenty ships had been completed since the outbreak of war. Five of these ships were from the United States Navy and one, the battlecruiser HMAS Australia, from the Royal Australian Navy. (Note: Although built for defence of the dominions and funded by New Zealand, HMS New Zealand was operated by the Royal Navy.) It had five battle squadrons, each of four to ten capital ships, plus the flagship HMS Queen Elizabeth, three cruiser squadrons, the "Flying Squadron" of seaplane carriers, and six destroyer flotillas, with another destroyer flotilla and three minesweeper flotillas under its command. The Battle Cruiser Force was two battle squadrons and the flagship HMS Lion (9 ships in total), and five cruiser squadrons (21 ships).

== Sources ==
- Corbett, J. S. (1920a). Naval Operations. History of the Great War. Vol. I. London: Longmans, Green & Co. OCLC 929536844 – via Archive Foundation.
- Corbett, J. S. (1923). Naval Operations. History of the Great War. Vol. III. London: Longmans, Green & Co. OCLC 867968279 – via Archive Foundation.
- Heathcote, T. A. (2002). British Admirals of the Fleet 1734–1995: A Biographical Dictionary. Barnsley: Leo Cooper. ISBN 0-85052-835-6.
- Jones, Jerry (1998). U.S. Battleship Operations in World War I. Annapolis, MD: Naval Institute Press. ISBN 978-1-55750-411-1.
- Tarrant, V. E. (1995). Jutland: The German Perspective. London: Cassell Military Paperbacks. ISBN 0-304-35848-7.
- Vat, Dan van der (2007) [1987]. The Grand Scuttle: The Sinking of the German Fleet at Scapa Flow in 1919. Edinburgh: Birlinn. ISBN 978-1-84341-038-6.
