= Henry Harwood =

Royal Navy admiral (1888–1950)

Admiral Sir Henry Harwood KCB OBE
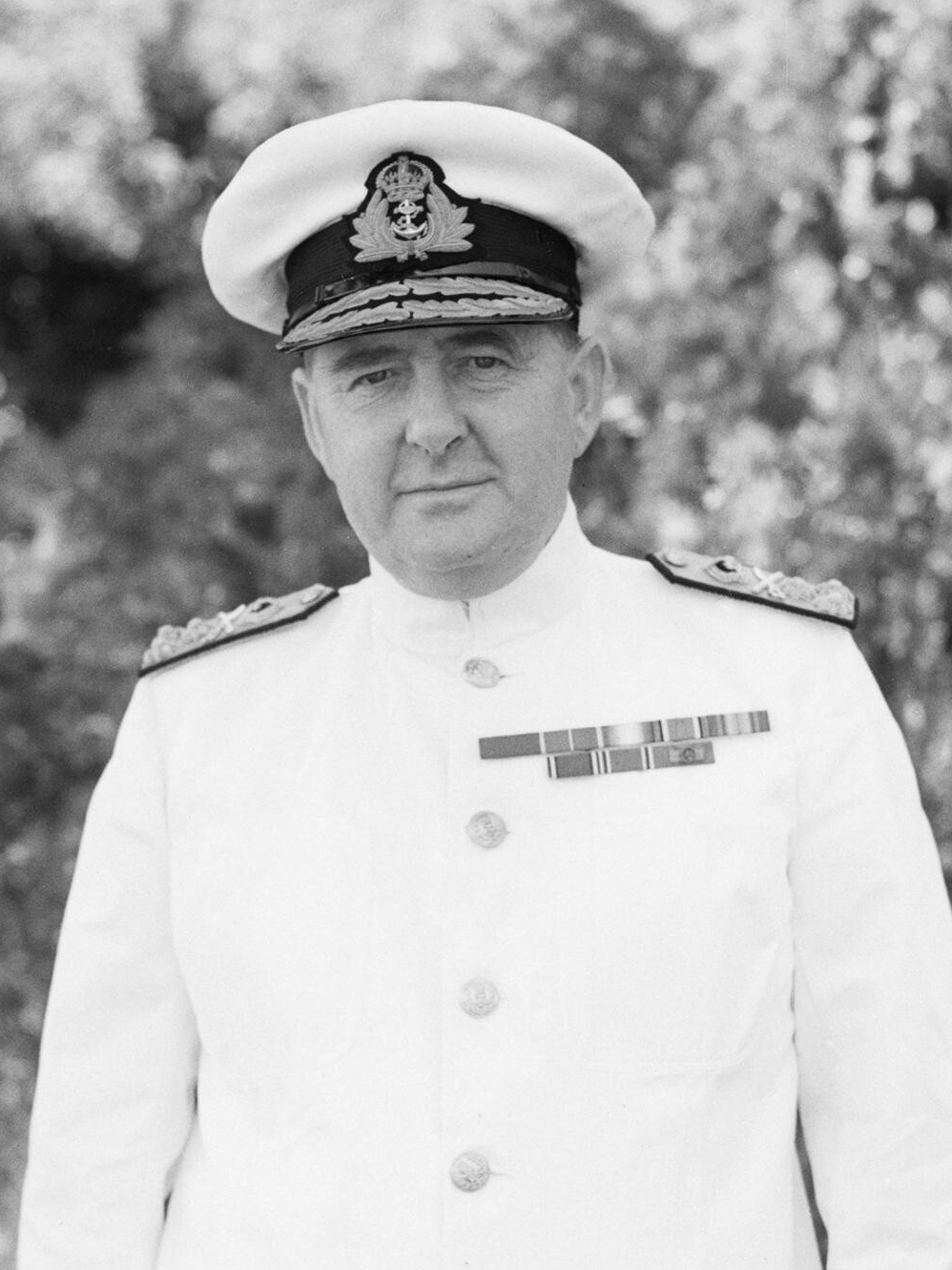
- Harwood in Alexandria, August 1942
- Born: 19 January 1888; St George Hanover Square, London
- Died: 9 June 1950 (aged 62); Goring-on-Thames, Oxfordshire
- Burial place: Goring-on-Thames parish churchyard
- Relatives: Kate Harwood (granddaughter)
- Military career
- Allegiance: United Kingdom
- Branch: Royal Navy
- Service years: 1904–1945
- Rank: Admiral
- Commands: Admiral Commanding, Orkneys and Shetlands (1944–45); Commander-in-Chief, Levant (1943); South American Division, North America and West Indies Station (1939–40); HMS Exeter (1936–39); HMS London (1932–34); 9th Destroyer Division (1929–30); HMS Warwick (1929–30); HMS Cumberland (1927–28)
- Conflicts: First World War; Second World War; Battle of the River Plate
- Awards: Knight Commander of the Order of the Bath; Officer of the Order of the British Empire; Mentioned in Despatches; War Cross (Greece); Gold Medal of Concepcion (Chile); Grand Officer of the Order of Merit (Chile)

Admiral Sir Henry Harwood Harwood (19 January 1888 – 9 June 1950) was a Royal Navy officer who commanded the British squadron at the Battle of the River Plate during the Second World War.

== Early life ==
Following education at Stubbington House School, Harwood entered the Royal Navy in 1904 and specialised in torpedoes. He served in the First World War. In 1919, he served on the battleship HMS Royal Sovereign), 1st Battle Squadron. By 1929 he had been promoted to captain and become the commanding officer of the destroyer HMS Warwick and Senior Officer of the 9th Destroyer Division.

In 1931 and 1932, Harwood attended the Imperial Defence College. Upon completion of the course in March 1932, he became flag captain of the heavy cruiser HMS London whilst at the same time serving as Chief Staff Officer to the Rear-Admiral Commanding the 1st Cruiser Squadron. From July 1934 until 1936, Harwood served on the staff of the Royal Naval War College at Greenwich (HMS President).

In September 1936, Harwood was appointed commodore and given command of the South American Division of the America and West Indies Station, whilst at the same time serving as commanding officer of the cruiser HMS Exeter. At the outbreak of the Second World War, command of HMS Exeter passed to Captain F. S. Bell. Commodore Harwood remained in Exeter until he transferred his pennant to HMS Ajax on 27 August.

== Second World War ==
Harwood commanded a squadron consisting of the heavy cruisers HMS Cumberland and HMS Exeter, and the light cruisers HMS Achilles and HMS Ajax. He flew his broad pennant in Ajax as his flagship. The squadron was deployed to the South Atlantic against the German pocket battleship Admiral Graf Spee, which was attacking Allied shipping there.

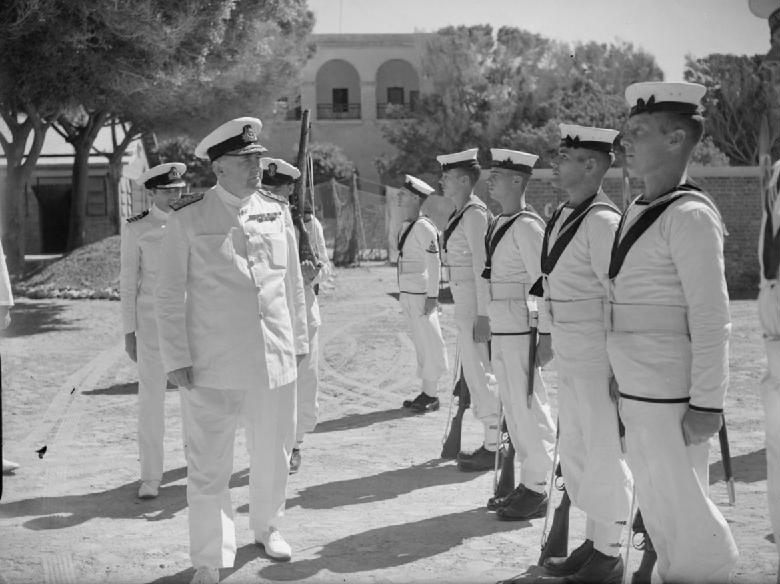
Vice-Admiral Harwood inspects ratings at HMS Canopus, the Royal Navy training base in Alexandria, in September 1942.

Harwood suspected that Graf Spee would try to strike next at the merchant shipping off the River Plate estuary. With Cumberland being absent for repairs, Harwood deployed his other three cruisers off the estuary on 12 December. In the ensuing Battle of the River Plate on 13 December, Harwood's cruisers were damaged, but so was Graf Spee, which entered Montevideo harbour in neutral Uruguay. She was scuttled there a few days later. For this action, Harwood was promoted to rear admiral and knighted.

Survivors of HMS Zulu being inspected by Harwood. The ship was lost off Tobruk in September 1942.

From December 1940 to April 1942, Rear-Admiral Harwood served as a Lord Commissioner of the Admiralty and Assistant Chief of Naval Staff. In April 1942, Harwood was promoted to vice-admiral and Commander-in-Chief, Mediterranean Fleet, and flew his flag at HMS Nile. The command was later split, and he became Commander-in-Chief, Levant, in February 1943, with responsibility for flank support and seaborne supply of the British Eighth Army.

In April 1944, Harwood became Admiral Commanding, Orkneys and Shetlands (HMS Proserpine). He retired on 15 August 1945 with the rank of admiral, having been declared medically unfit for further duty.

== Post-war ==
Sir Henry Harwood died in Goring-on-Thames in 1950. Harwood Avenue, the main thoroughfare in the town of Ajax, Ontario, was named after him. In the 1956 film, The Battle of the River Plate, Harwood was played by Anthony Quayle.

Military offices
Preceded by Sir Andrew Cunningham	Commander-in-Chief, Mediterranean Fleet; 1942–1943	Succeeded by Sir Andrew Cunningham
New command	Commander-in-Chief, Levant; February–June 1943	Succeeded by Sir John Cunningham
Preceded by Sir Lionel Wells	Admiral Commanding, Orkneys and Shetlands; 1944–1945	Command disbanded
