= Matthew Best (Royal Navy officer) =

Royal Navy Admiral (1878–1940)

Admiral The Honourable Sir Matthew Best KCB DSO* MVO
- Born: 18 June 1878; Frampton, Dorset
- Died: 13 October 1940 (aged 62); Crockway, Frampton, Dorset
- Military career
- Allegiance: United Kingdom
- Branch: Royal Navy
- Service years: 1892–1939
- Rank: Admiral
- Commands: HMS Queen Elizabeth; HMS Excellent; HMS Nelson; 2nd Cruiser Squadron; America and West Indies Station
- Conflicts: First World War: Battle of Jutland
- Awards: Knight Commander of the Order of the Bath; Distinguished Service Order & Bar; Member of the Royal Victorian Order; Mentioned in Despatches

Admiral Sir Matthew Robert Best KCB, DSO & Bar, MVO (18 June 1878 – 13 October 1940) was a Royal Navy officer who went on to be Commander-in-Chief, America and West Indies Station.

== Early life ==
Best was born in Frampton, Dorset, on 18 June 1878, the fifth child and third son of George Best (later the 5th Baron Wynford) and his wife Edith Anne (née Marsh).

== Naval career ==
Best joined the Royal Navy in 1892, was promoted to Sub Lieutenant in 1898, to Lieutenant in 1900, and to Commander in 1911. He served in the First World War and fought at the Battle of Jutland in 1916 as Staff Officer to the Commander-in-chief of the Grand Fleet where he was awarded the Distinguished Service Order (DSO) and commended for his service. He received a Bar to the Distinguished Service Order in 1918. He was appointed Commanding Officer of HMS Queen Elizabeth in 1919 and Commanding Officer HMS Nelson and Chief of Staff to the Commander-in-Chief of the Atlantic Fleet in 1927, before becoming Commander of the 2nd Cruiser Squadron in the Atlantic Fleet in 1929. He was appointed Admiral Superintendent of Malta Dockyard in 1931 and Commander-in-Chief, America and West Indies Station, based at the Royal Naval Dockyard Bermuda (with his shore residence at Admiralty House Bermuda), in 1934. He was promoted vice-admiral on 13 November 1932 and admiral on 19 June 1936.

He died with the rank of admiral in 1940 at Frampton in Dorset.

== Honours ==
Best was appointed a Member (4th class) of the Royal Victorian Order in 1910. He was appointed a Companion of the Order of the Bath (CB) in the 1928 Birthday Honours, and promoted to Knight Commander of the Order (KCB) in the 1935 New Year Honours.

Military offices
Preceded by Francis Mitchell	Admiral Superintendent, Malta Dockyard; 1931–1934	Succeeded by Sir Wilfred French
Preceded by Sir Reginald Plunkett	Commander-in-Chief, America and West Indies Station; 1934–1937	Succeeded by Sir Sidney Meyrick
