= Frederic Brock =

Royal Navy Admiral (1854–1929)

Admiral Sir Frederic Brock GBE KCMG CB
- Brock in 1918
- Born: 15 October 1854
- Died: 1 November 1929 (aged 75)
- Military career
- Allegiance: United Kingdom
- Branch: Royal Navy
- Rank: Admiral
- Commands: HMS Highflyer; HMS Camperdown; HMS Bacchante; HMS Andromeda; HMS Diadem; HMS Donegal; HMS Triumph; Orkneys and Shetlands Command
- Conflicts: First World War
- Awards: Knight Grand Cross of the Order of the British Empire; Knight Commander of the Order of St Michael and St George; Companion of the Order of the Bath

Sir Frederic Edward Errington Brock (15 October 1854 – 1 November 1929) was a Royal Navy officer.

== Naval career ==
Brock was promoted to lieutenant in the Royal Navy on 8 December 1879. Promoted to captain on 30 June 1898, he was given command of the protected cruiser HMS Highflyer in December 1899, when she was part of a Training squadron, including a visit to Gibraltar in March 1900. He was subsequently flag captain to rear-admiral Day Bosanquet during his years on the Highflyer as Commander-in-Chief of the East Indies Station. He transferred to a temporary command of the second-class battleship HMS Camperdown for a month from 24 September to 7 November 1902, before he was appointed in command of the armoured cruiser HMS Bacchante on 25 November 1902, for her outbound journey to her first commission in the Mediterranean Squadron. On arrival she replaced HMS Andromeda as flagship of its cruiser squadron, and Brock changed places on 20 December with Captain Christopher Cradock, who had until then been in command of Andromeda. Brock then brought the Andromeda home, and paid her off at Portsmouth on 10 February 1903. He was later given command of the protected cruiser HMS Diadem in July 1903, followed by command of the armoured cruiser HMS Donegal in November 1903, before transferring to the battleship HMS Triumph in May 1905. Brock was appointed a Naval Aide-de-Camp in 1907.

Brock became Rear-Admiral Commanding the Portsmouth Division of the Home Fleet in November 1909, Senior Naval Officer at Gibraltar in September 1912 and, during the First World War, Admiral Commanding, Orkneys and Shetlands in January 1916.

== Honours ==
Brock was appointed a Companion of the Order of the Bath (CB) in 1912, a Knight Commander of the Order of St Michael and St George (KCMG) in the 1916 New Year Honours for wartime naval service, and a Knight Grand Cross of the Order of the British Empire (GBE) in the 1926 Birthday Honours.

He was awarded the Cross of Commander of the Legion of Honour in 1916.

Military offices
Preceded by Sir Stanley Colville	Admiral Commanding, Orkneys and Shetlands; 1916–1918	Succeeded by Sir Herbert King-Hall
