= HMS Crescent (1892) =

Cruiser of the Royal Navy

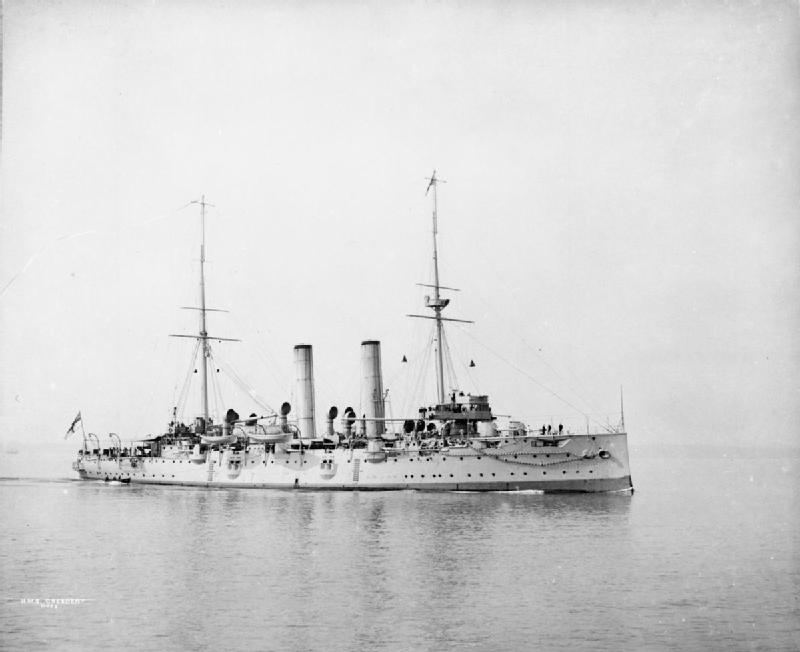
- HMS Crescent

History

United Kingdom
- Name: HMS Crescent
- Builder: Portsmouth Dockyard
- Laid down: 13 October 1890
- Launched: 30 March 1892
- Fate: Sold for breaking up 22 September 1921

General characteristics
- Class & type: Edgar-class cruiser
- Displacement: 7,700 tons
- Length: 387.5 ft (118.1 m)
- Beam: 60.75 ft (18.52 m)
- Speed: 20 knots (37 km/h)
- Armament: 1 × BL 9.2-inch (234 mm) Mk VI gun; 12 × QF 6-inch (152 mm) guns; 12 × 6 pdr (57 mm) guns

HMS Crescent was a first class cruiser of the Edgar class in the British Royal Navy. Crescent, and her sister ship Royal Arthur, were built to a slightly modified design and are sometimes considered a separate class. She was launched in 1892, saw early service at the Australia Station and the North America and West Indies Station, served in the First World War, and was sold for breaking up in 1921.

== Construction ==
Crescent had a length of 387 feet 6 inches (118.11 m) long overall and 360 feet (109.73 m) between perpendiculars, with a beam of 60 feet (18.29 m) and a draught of 23 feet 9 inches (7.24 m). She displaced 7,350 long tons (7,470 t). Armament consisted of two 9.2-inch guns, on the ships centreline, backed up by ten six-inch guns, of which four were in casemates on the main deck and the remainder behind open shields. Twelve 6-pounder and four 3-pounder guns provided anti-torpedo-boat defences, while four 18 inch (450 mm) torpedo tubes were fitted.

The Edgars were protected cruisers, with an arched, armoured deck 5–3 inches (127–76 mm) thick at about waterline level. The casemate armour was 6 inches (152 mm) thick, with 3 inches (76 mm) thick shields for the 9.2-inch guns and 10 inches (254 mm) armour on the ship's conning tower. It contained four double-ended cylindrical Fairfields boilers feeding steam at 150 pounds per square inch (1,000 kPa) to 2 three-cylinder triple expansion engines, which drove two shafts. This gave 12,000 indicated horsepower (8,900 kW) under forced draught, giving a speed of 20 knots (37 km/h; 23 mph).

She was built at Portsmouth and launched on 30 March 1892.

== Service history ==
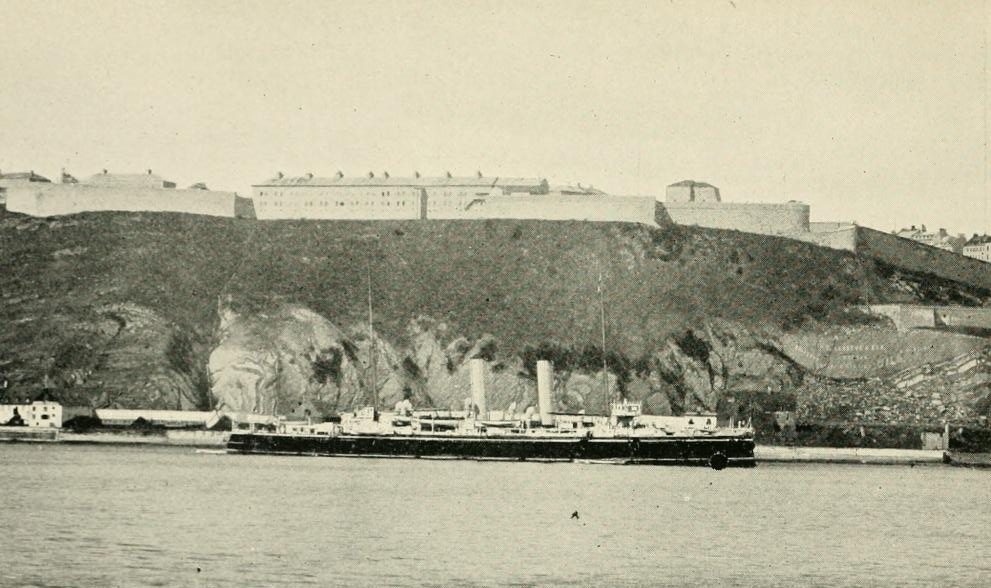
HMS Crescent at Quebec City, Quebec in 1901

Crescent had her first commission at the Australia Station. On 11 January 1895 she left Australia under Captain Arbuthnot.

From 1899 until 1902 she was flagship of Vice-Admiral Sir Frederick Bedford, Commander-in-Chief North America and West Indies Station, which had headquarters at Bermuda and (during summer) Halifax. Under the command of Captain Charles John Graves-Sawle she visited Trinidad and Jamaica in February 1900, and the following month Nassau, Bahamas to assist HMS Hermes, stranded there with a broken shaft. Captain Stanley Colville was appointed in command on 1 March 1900, but did not actually take command of the ship until later. The ship took part in coronation celebrations at the Halifax headquarter in that year. Bedford was succeeded as Commander-in-Chief at the station on 15 July 1902, when he left homebound with Crescent, which was succeeded as flagship of the station by HMS Ariadne. She arrived at Spithead on 24 July, but her commission was prolonged so she could take part in the fleet review held there on 16 August 1902 for the coronation of King Edward VII. Following the review, the King went on a tour westwards along the coast, with Crescent as escort ship. She returned to Portsmouth in early September, paying off there on 3 October for a complete overhaul.

She served in the First World War, and was sold on 22 September 1921 for breaking up in Germany.
