= Francis Spurstow Miller =

Royal Navy Admiral (1863–1954)

Admiral Francis Spurstow Miller CB
- Miller in 1919
- Born: 25 November 1863; Liverpool, Lancashire, England
- Died: 6 February 1954 (aged 90); Bournemouth, Dorset, England
- Military career
- Allegiance: United Kingdom
- Branch: Royal Navy
- Rank: Admiral
- Commands: HMS Hawke; HMS Sutlej; HMS Goliath; HMS Duncan; Scapa Flow; Northern Division, Coast of Ireland
- Conflicts: First World War
- Awards: Companion of the Order of the Bath

Admiral Francis Spurstow Miller CB (25 November 1863 – 6 February 1954) was a Royal Navy officer.

== Naval career ==
Miller was promoted to lieutenant on 22 May 1885. Promoted to captain on 30 June 1903, he was given command of the protected cruiser HMS Hawke in July 1903, the armoured cruiser HMS Sutlej in May 1906 and the battleship HMS Goliath in December 1907 before transferring to the command of the battleship HMS Duncan in December 1912. He became Flag Officer, Scapa Flow in August 1914 and Flag Officer, Northern Division, Coast of Ireland in May 1917.

== Sources ==
- Newbolt, Henry (1931). Naval Operations. Vol. V. Longmans, Green & Co.
