= Robert Prendergast =

Royal Navy Admiral (1864–1946)

Admiral Sir Robert Prendergast KCB
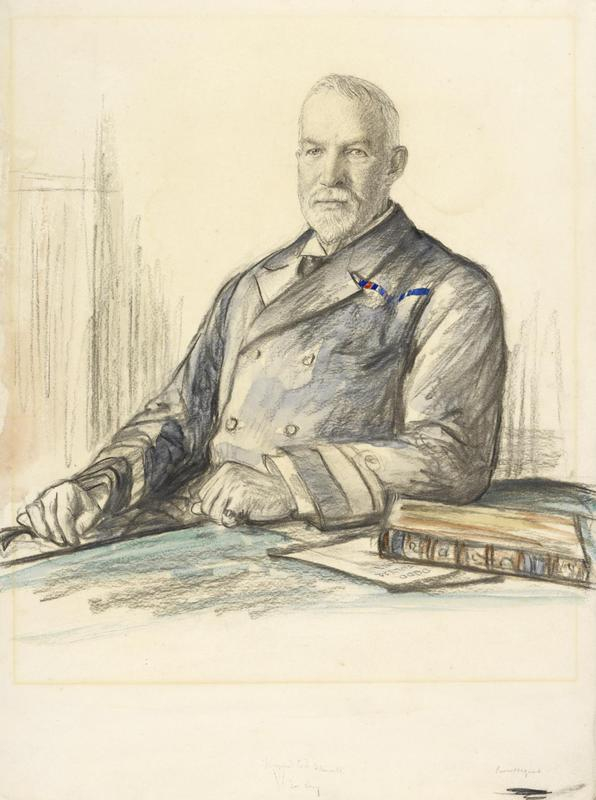
- 1917 portrait by Francis Dodd

Rear-Admiral/Vice-Admiral Commanding Orkneys and Shetlands
- In office March 1919 – February 1920

Rear-Admiral Commanding Scapa Flow
- In office May 1916 – March 1919

Captain-Superintendent/Admiral-Superintendent of Sheerness Dockyard
- In office 1911 – May 1916

Personal details
- Born: Robert John Prendergast; 9 July 1864 Dublin, Ireland
- Died: 14 May 1946 (aged 81) Meads House, Eastbourne, Sussex, England
- Relations: Sir Thomas Prendergast, 1st Baronet
- Awards: Knight Commander of the Order of the Bath

Military service
- Allegiance: United Kingdom
- Branch/service: Royal Navy
- Rank: Admiral
- Commands: HMS Essex; HMS Carnarvon; HMS Implacable; Sheerness Dockyard; Scapa Flow; Orkneys and Shetlands Command
- Battles/wars: First World War

Admiral Sir Robert John Prendergast KCB (9 July 1864 – 14 May 1946) was a Royal Navy officer.

== Career ==
The son of a surgeon-general with a family seat at Ardfinnan Castle in Ireland, Prendergast entered the Royal Navy as a Cadet in 1877. He served in the Anglo-Egyptian War of 1882 as a midshipman aboard the broadside ironclad HMS Achilles. In 1885 he transferred to the gunboat HMS Grappler at Gibraltar. He was promoted lieutenant in June 1887 and joined the corvette HMS Volage in the Training Squadron in 1888. In 1889 he went to HMS Excellent to train as a gunnery officer and was then posted to the battleship HMS Collingwood and then to the frigate HMS Raleigh, flagship of the Training Squadron.

In 1899 he was promoted commander and posted to HMS Northampton, a seagoing training ships for boys. In December 1901 he was posted to HMS Excellent, where he was promoted captain. In 1904 he went to the Naval Ordnance Department at the Admiralty, and then commanded in succession the cruisers HMS Essex and HMS Carnarvon and the battleship HMS Implacable. In 1911 he was appointed captain-superintendent of Sheerness Dockyard.

In November 1914 he was promoted rear-admiral, but remained at Sheerness. In May 1916 he was appointed rear-admiral commanding Scapa Flow, hoisting his flag in the depot ship HMS Imperieuse and then the dockyard repair ship HMS Victorious. In March 1919 he was appointed rear-admiral commanding, Orkneys and Shetlands. He was promoted vice-admiral later that year and appointed Knight Commander of the Order of the Bath (KCB) in the 1920 New Year Honours, having been appointed Companion of the Order of the Bath (CB) the previous year. He retired in February 1920 when Scapa Flow was reduced to a peace footing, and was promoted admiral on the retired list in 1924.

== Death ==
Following retirement, Prendergast moved to Eastbourne, where he lived at Meads House and his Irish home at Ardfinnan Castle was sold out of the family. By 1946 he was senile and developed a bladder infection, for which he was treated by society doctor and suspected serial killer Dr John Bodkin Adams. Adams would visit twice a day and prescribed morphine. On the morning of 14 May 1946, Prendergast slipped into a coma and died at 7.30 p.m. that evening. Adams certified the death as a) uraemia and b) chronic nephritis. His nurse, Anne Masters, later told police, "I am quite convinced that the injections of morphia hastened Sir Prendergast's [sic] death". Adams was tried for the murder of Edith Alice Morrell in 1957 but acquitted, though police suspected him of a total of 163 murders.

Prendergast's ashes lie in niche 1077 of the east columbarium of Golders Green Crematorium on the 4th floor therein.

== Arms ==
Coat of arms of Robert Prendergast
Notes Confirmed by Sir Arthur Vicars, Ulster King of Arms, 30 October 1905. Crest On a wreath of the colours an antelope's head couped Proper charged with a trefoil Vert. Escutcheon Gules a saltire engrailed Vair a bordure Or charged with eight trefoils of the field. Motto Veritas Vincit

== Sources ==
- Cullen, Pamela V., A Stranger in Blood: The Case Files on Dr John Bodkin Adams, London, Elliott & Thompson, 2006, ISBN 1-904027-19-9

Military offices
Preceded by Sir Herbert King-Hall	Admiral Commanding, Orkneys and Shetlands; 1919–1920	Succeeded by Post disbanded
