= Henry Jackson (Royal Navy officer) =

Royal Navy Admiral of the Fleet (1855–1929)

Admiral of the Fleet Sir Henry Jackson GCB KCVO FRS
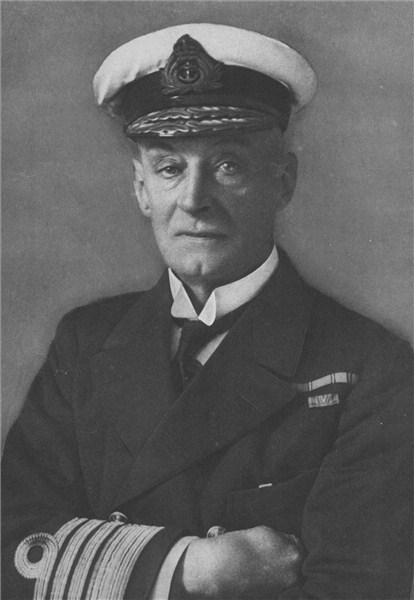
- Admiral of the Fleet Sir Henry Jackson
- Born: 21 January 1855; Barnsley, Yorkshire
- Died: 14 December 1929 (aged 74); Hayling Island, Hampshire
- Military career
- Allegiance: United Kingdom
- Branch: Royal Navy
- Service years: 1868–1924
- Rank: Admiral of the Fleet
- Commands: First Sea Lord; Royal Naval College, Greenwich; 6th Cruiser Squadron; HMS Vernon; HMS Duncan; HMS Vulcan; HMS Juno
- Conflicts: Anglo-Zulu War; First World War
- Awards: Knight Grand Cross of the Order of the Bath; Knight Commander of the Royal Victorian Order; Grand Cross of the Order of Naval Merit (Spain); Grand Cordon of the Order of the Rising Sun (Japan)

Admiral of the Fleet Sir Henry Bradwardine Jackson, GCB, KCVO, FRS (21 January 1855 – 14 December 1929) was a British Royal Navy officer. After serving in the Anglo-Zulu War he established an early reputation as a pioneer of ship-to-ship Wireless technology. Later he became the first person to achieve ship-to-ship wireless communications and demonstrated continuous communication with another vessel up to three miles away. He went on to be Third Sea Lord and Controller of the Navy, then Director of the Royal Naval War College and subsequently Chief of the Admiralty War Staff. He was advisor on overseas expeditions planning attacks on Germany's colonial possessions at the start of the First World War and was selected as the surprise successor to Admiral Lord Fisher upon the latter's spectacular resignation in May 1915 following the failure of the Gallipoli Campaign. He had a cordial working relationship with First Lord of the Admiralty (and former Prime Minister) Arthur Balfour, but largely concerned himself with administrative matters and his prestige suffered when German destroyers appeared in the Channel, as a result of which he was replaced in December 1916.

== Early career ==
Born the son of Henry Jackson (linen manufacturer and bleacher) and Jane Jackson (née Tee) of Barnsley was educated in Chester and then at Stubbington House School near Fareham in Hampshire, Henry Bradwardine Jackson joined the Royal Navy as a cadet in the training ship HMS Britannia in 1868. He was made a midshipman in the armoured frigate HMS Hector in the Reserve Fleet in April 1870 before transferring to the corvette HMS Cadmus in December 1871. Promoted to sub-lieutenant on 18 October 1874, he was posted to the corvette HMS Rover on the North America and West Indies Station in August 1876. Promoted to again to lieutenant on 27 October 1877, he joined the corvette HMS Active on the Cape of Good Hope Station in March 1878 and saw action ashore during the Anglo-Zulu War in 1879. He attended the torpedo school HMS Vernon in 1881 and, after qualifying as a torpedo officer, joined the directing staff there.

Promoted to commander on 1 January 1890, Jackson became commanding officer of the torpedo school training ship HMS Defiance at Wearde Quay near Saltash in January 1895: at the school he established an early reputation as a pioneer of ship-to-ship Wireless technology. Promoted to captain on 30 June 1896, he became the first person to achieve ship-to-ship wireless communications and demonstrated continuous communication with another vessel up to three miles away. Later trials achieved transmission over distances up to 140 miles, and investigated the effects of intervening land. He became naval attaché in Paris in 1897 and went on to be commanding officer of the cruiser HMS Juno (equipped with wireless) in July 1899 and commanding officer of the torpedo depot ship HMS Vulcan (also equipped with wireless) in the Mediterranean Fleet in December 1899. He worked with Marconi to develop a fleet wireless system and this achievement was recognised with his election as a Fellow of the Royal Society in 1901.

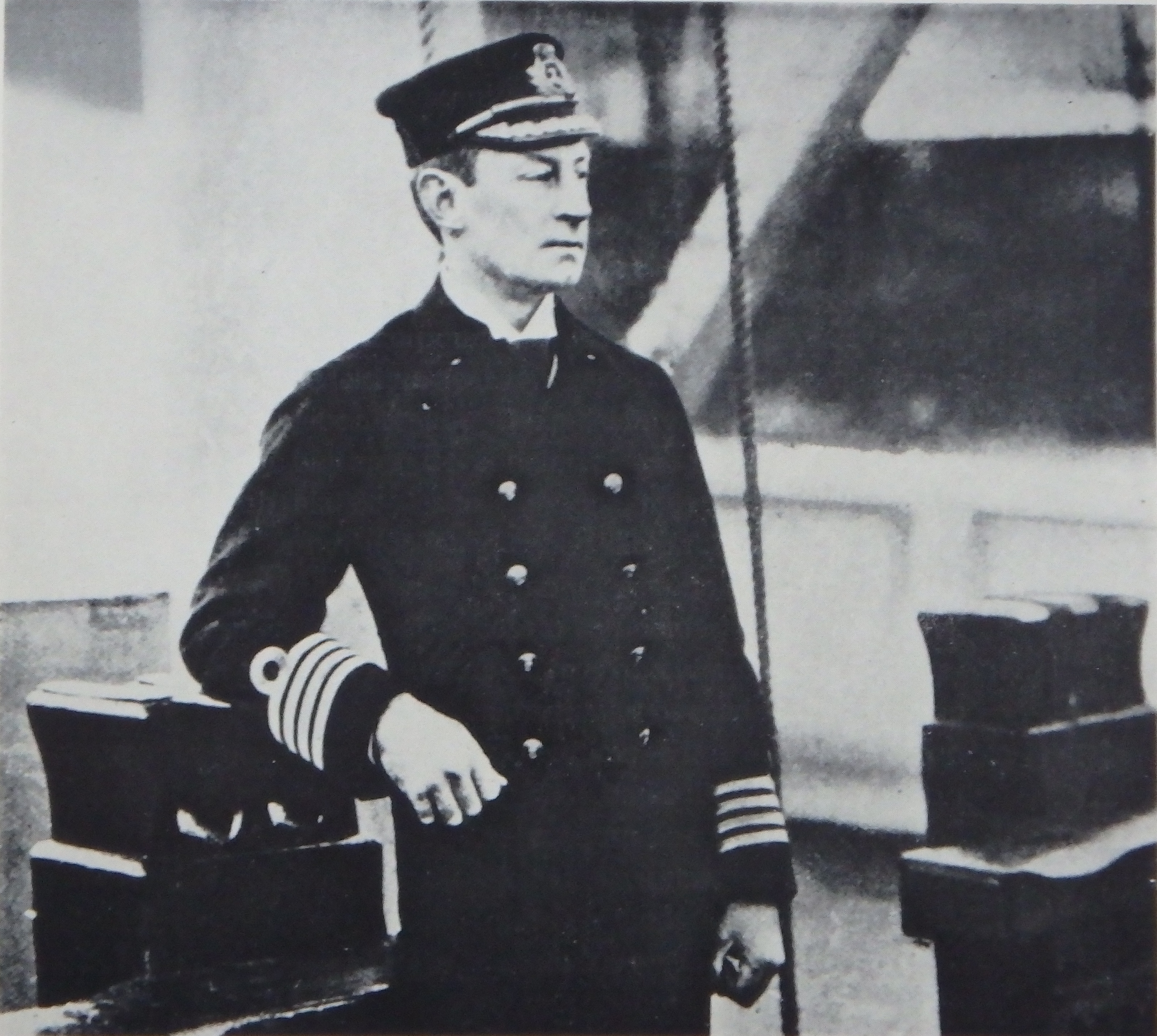
Jackson in 1897 when he was carrying out his early experiments on HMS Defiance

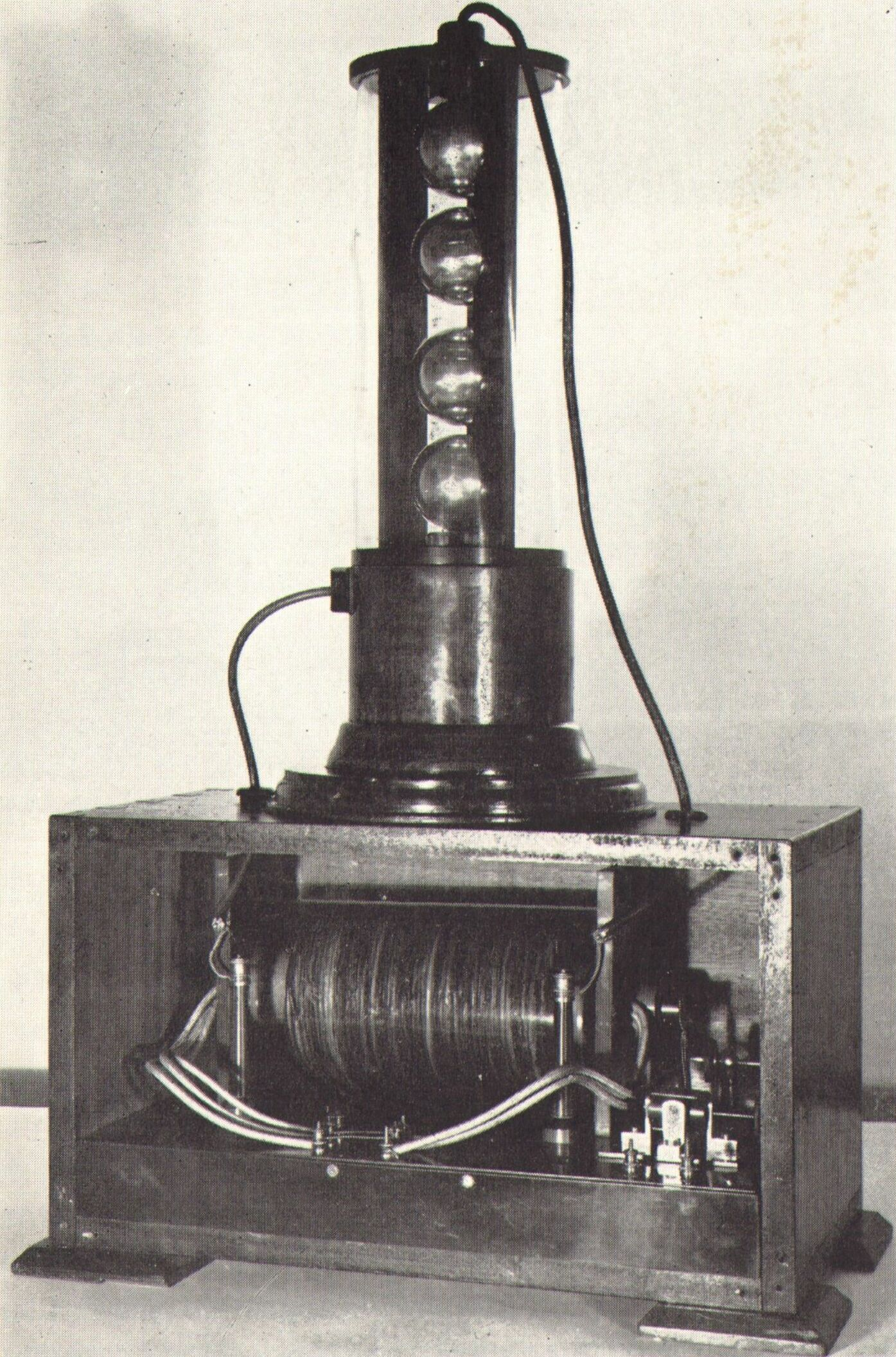
Jackson's 1897 transmitter

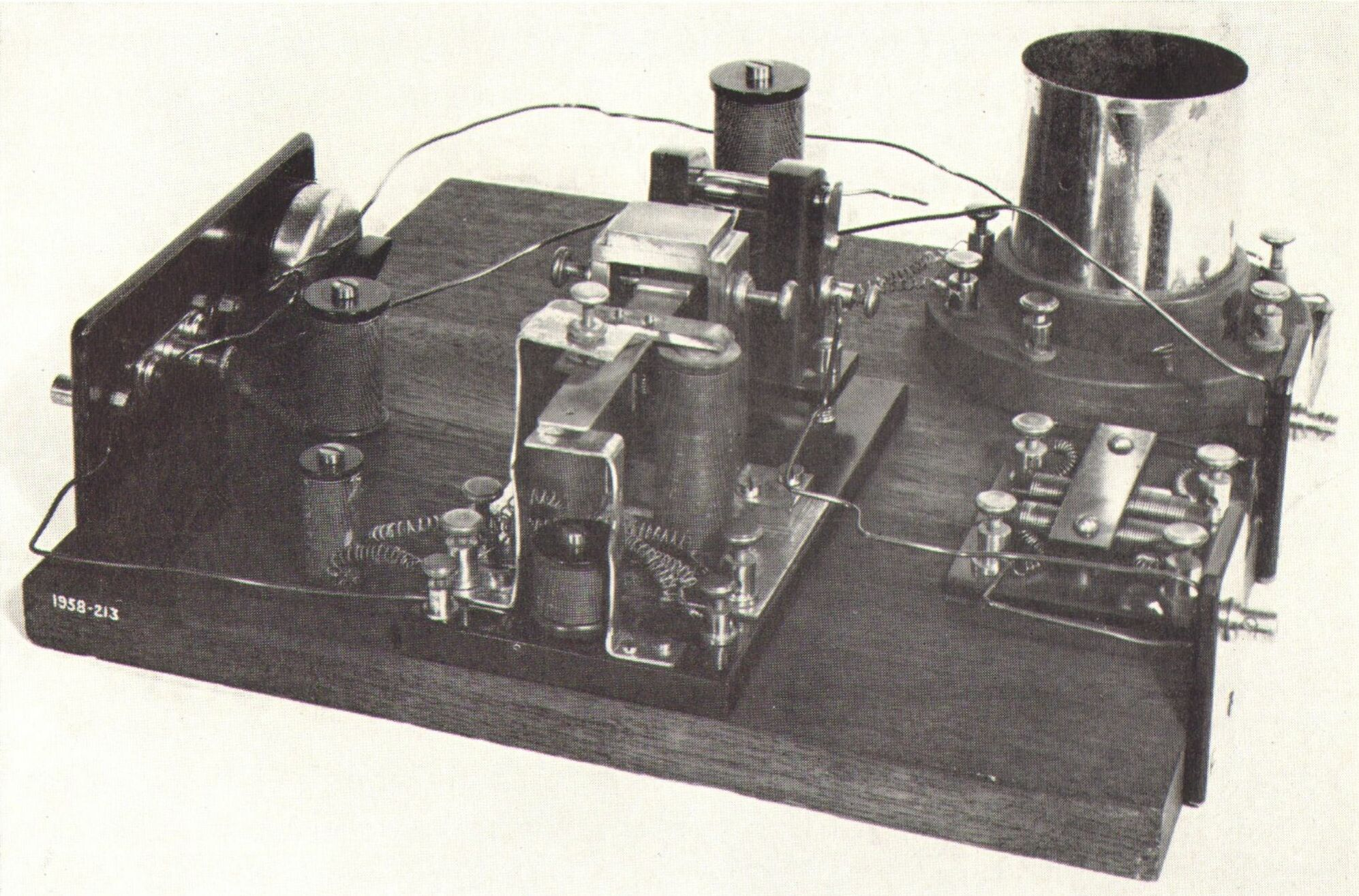
Jackson's 1897 receiver

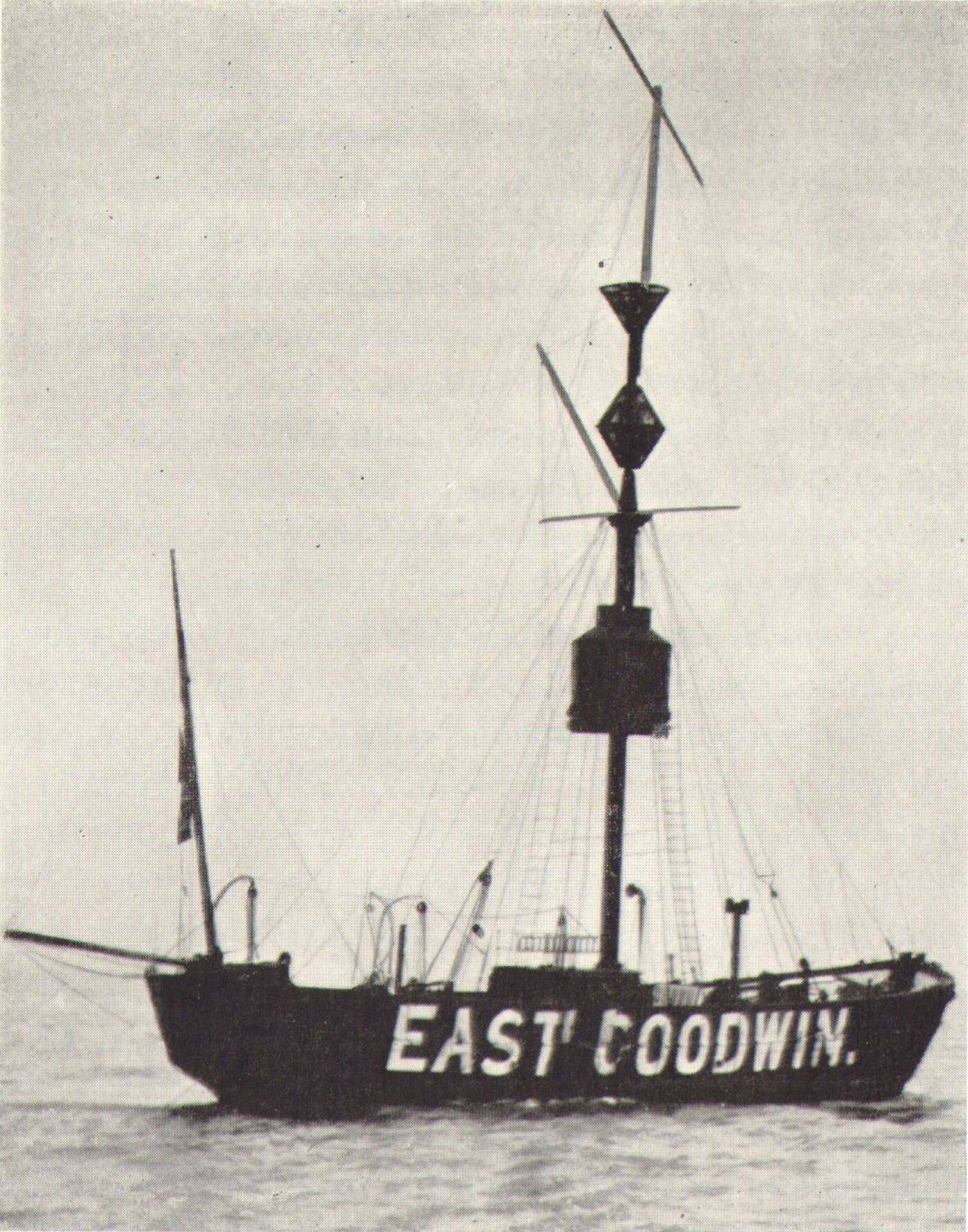
The East Goodwin Lightship in 1898, the first lightvessel to be equipped with wireless

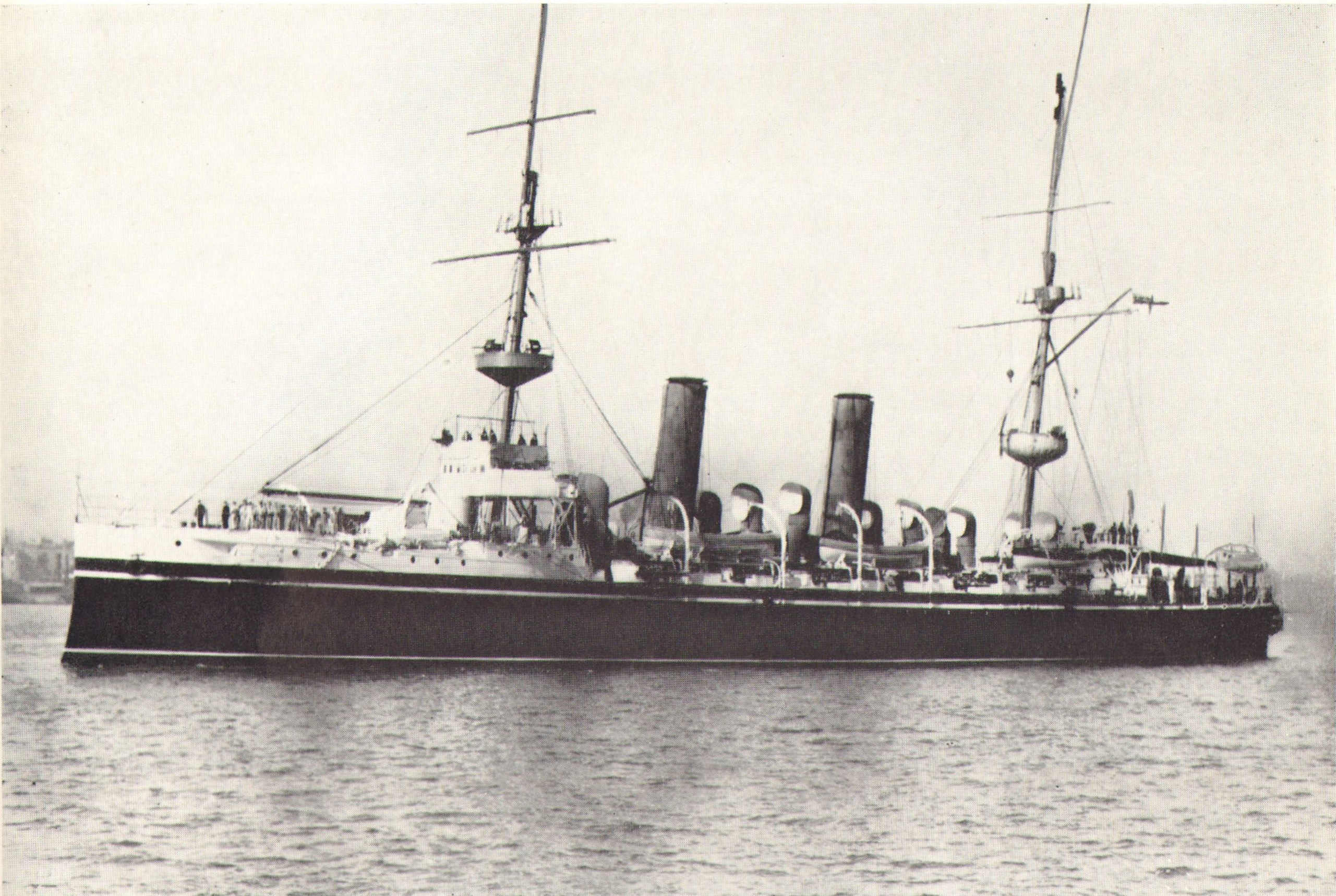
HMS Juno. The cruiser equipped with wireless and commanded by Captain H.B. Jackson during the Summer Manoeuvres of 1899.

He went on to be assistant director of Naval Ordnance at the Admiralty in February 1902, Commanding Officer of the battleship HMS Duncan in October 1903 and Captain of the torpedo school HMS Vernon in September 1904. He was promoted to Third Sea Lord and Controller of the Navy in February 1905 and, having been appointed a Naval Aide-de-Camp to the King on 12 September 1905, he was promoted to rear admiral on 18 October 1906. Appointed a Knight Commander of the Royal Victorian Order on 9 November 1906, he became Commander of the 6th Cruiser Squadron in the Mediterranean Fleet, hoisting his flag in the armoured cruiser HMS Bacchante, in October 1908. He was awarded the Grand Cross of the Spanish Order of Naval Merit on the occasion of the visit of his flagship to Valencia in May 1909.

Jackson was promoted to vice admiral on 15 March 1911 on appointment as Director of the Royal Naval War College. He became Chief of the Admiralty War Staff in February 1913, and having been promoted to full admiral on 10 February 1914, he became advisor on overseas expeditions, planning attacks on Germany's colonial possessions at the start of World War I.

== First Sea Lord ==
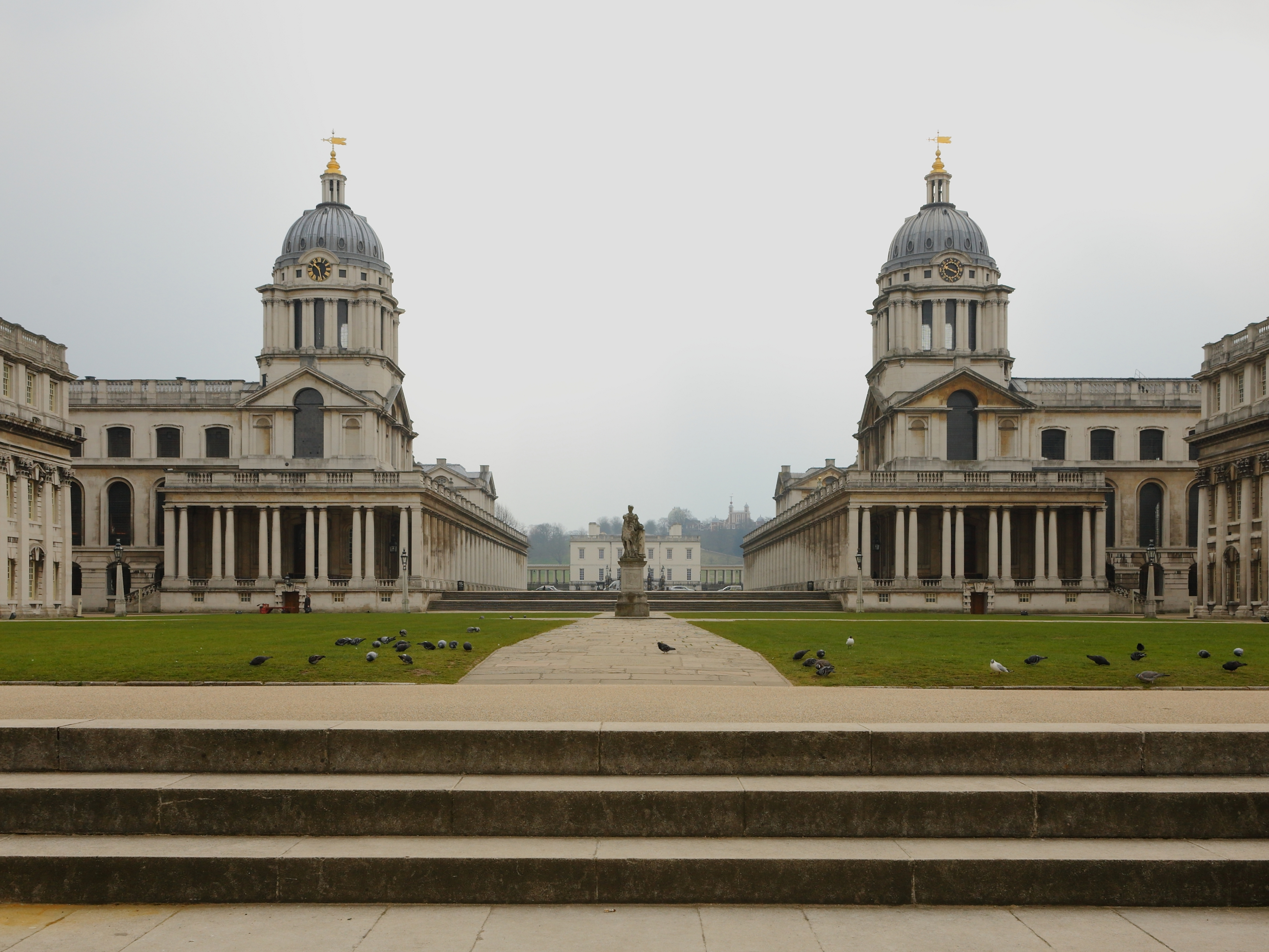
The Royal Naval College, Greenwich where Jackson served as President

Jackson was selected as the surprise successor to Admiral Lord Fisher upon the latter's spectacular resignation in May 1915 following the failure of the Gallipoli Campaign. He had a cordial working relationship with First Lord of the Admiralty (and former Prime Minister) Arthur Balfour but largely concerned himself with administrative matters and his prestige suffered when German destroyers appeared in the Channel. Consequently, Sir John Jellicoe was appointed to replace Jackson in December 1916. Jackson was appointed a Knight Grand Cross of the Order of the Bath on 4 December 1916.

== Later life ==
Jackson became President of the Royal Naval College, Greenwich in December 1916 and was appointed First and Principal Naval Aide-de-Camp on 2 April 1917. He was also awarded the Grand Cordon of the Japanese Order of the Rising Sun on 2 November 1917. He was promoted to Admiral of the Fleet on 31 July 1919 and retired from the Royal Naval College in August 1919. He was appointed the first Chairman of the Radio Research Board of the Department of Scientific and Industrial Research in 1920 and also won the Hughes Medal from the Royal Society "for his pioneer work in the scientific investigations of radiotelegraphy and its application to navigation" in 1926. In the 1920s, Jackson assisted Winston Churchill by checking some of the facts in his books on the Great War, The World Crisis.

He died at his home at Hayling Island in Hampshire on 14 December 1929.

== Family ==
In 1890 Jackson married Alice Burbury, daughter of Samuel Hawksley Burbury FRS; they had no children.

== Sources ==
- Heathcote, Tony (2002). The British Admirals of the Fleet 1734 – 1995. Pen & Sword Ltd. ISBN 0-85052-835-6.

Military offices
Preceded by Sir William May	Third Sea Lord and Controller of the Navy; 1905–1908	Succeeded by Lord Jellicoe
Preceded by Lord Fisher	First Sea Lord; 1915–1916	Succeeded by Lord Jellicoe
Preceded by Sir Lewis Bayly	President, Royal Naval College, Greenwich; 1916–1919	Succeeded by Sir William Pakenham
Honorary titles
Preceded by Sir George Callaghan	First and Principal Naval Aide-de-Camp; 1917–1919	Succeeded by Sir Stanley Colville
