= HMS Sutlej (1899) =

Cruiser of the Royal Navy

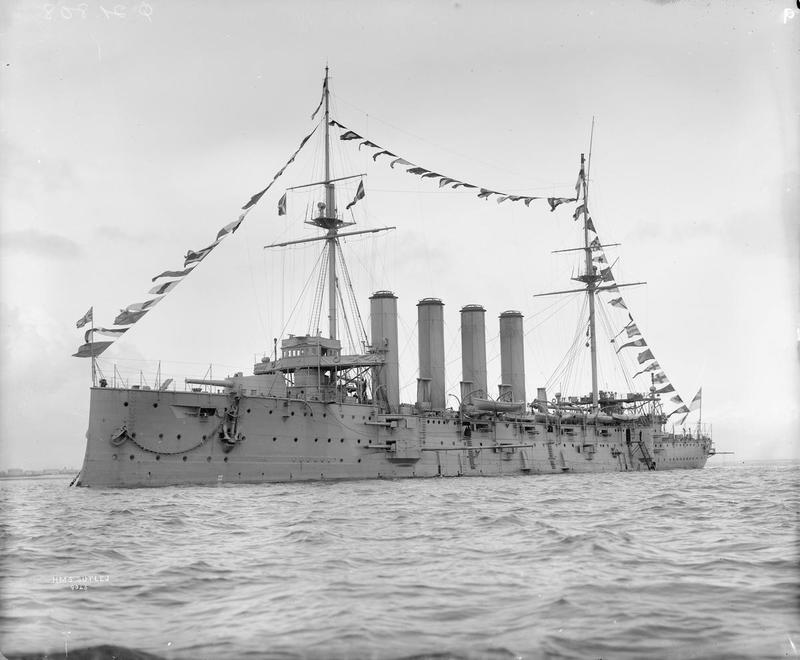
- Sutlej at anchor

History

United Kingdom
- Name: HMS Sutlej
- Namesake: Two battles on the Sutlej River during the First Anglo-Sikh War
- Builder: John Brown & Company, Clydeside
- Laid down: 15 August 1898
- Launched: 18 November 1899
- Commissioned: 6 May 1902
- Renamed: Crescent, January 1918; Sutlej, 1919
- Reclassified: Accommodation ship, 1917; Depot ship, January 1918
- Fate: Sold 9 May 1921, broken up, 1924

General characteristics
- Class & type: Cressy-class armoured cruiser
- Displacement: 12,000 long tons (12,000 t) (normal)
- Length: 472 ft (143.9 m) (o/a)
- Beam: 69 ft 6 in (21.2 m)
- Draught: 26 ft 9 in (8.2 m) (maximum)
- Installed power: 21,000 ihp (16,000 kW); 30 Belleville boilers
- Propulsion: 2 × shafts; 2 × 4-cylinder triple-expansion steam engines
- Speed: 21 knots (39 km/h; 24 mph)
- Complement: 725–760
- Armament: 2 × single BL 9.2-inch Mk X guns; 12 × single BL 6-inch Mk VII guns; 12 × single QF 12 pdr 12 cwt guns (Note: "Cwt" is the abbreviation for hundredweight, 12 cwt referring to the weight of the gun.); 3 × 3-pounder (47 mm) Hotchkiss guns; 2 × single submerged 18-inch torpedo tubes
- Armour: Belt: 2–6 in (51–152 mm); Decks: 1–3 in (25–76 mm); Barbettes: 6 in (152 mm); Turrets: 6 in (150 mm); Conning tower: 12 in (305 mm); Bulkheads: 5 in (127 mm)

HMS Sutlej was a Cressy-class armoured cruiser built for the Royal Navy around 1900. Upon completion she was assigned to the China Station. In 1906 she became a training ship for the North America and West Indies Station before returning home and being assigned as the flagship of the reserve Third Fleet in 1909. Relieved as flagship in 1910, she remained in reserve until the beginning of World War I in August 1914.

She was spent most of the war on convoy escort duties before becoming an accommodation ship in 1917 and then a depot ship in 1918. Sutlej was sold for scrap in 1921, but was not broken up until 1924.

== Design and description ==
Sutlej was designed to displace 12,000 long tons (12,000 t). The ship had an overall length of 472 feet (143.9 m), a beam of 69 feet 9 inches (21.3 m) and a deep draught of 26 feet 9 inches (8.2 m). She was powered by two 4-cylinder triple-expansion steam engines, each driving one shaft, which produced a total of 21,000 indicated horsepower (15,660 kW) and gave a maximum speed of 21 knots (39 km/h; 24 mph). The engines were powered by 30 Belleville boilers. On their sea trials all of the Cressy-class cruisers, except the lead ship, exceeded their designed speed. She carried a maximum of 1,600 long tons (1,600 t) of coal and her complement ranged from 725 to 760 officers and ratings.

Her main armament consisted of two breech-loading (BL) 9.2-inch (234 mm) Mk X guns in single gun turrets, one each fore and aft of the superstructure. They fired 380-pound (170 kg) shells to a range of 15,500 yards (14,200 m). Her secondary armament of twelve BL 6-inch Mk VII guns was arranged in casemates amidships. Eight of these were mounted on the main deck and were only usable in calm weather. They had a maximum range of approximately 12,200 yards (11,200 m) with their 100-pound (45 kg) shells. A dozen quick-firing (QF) 12-pounder 12 cwt guns were fitted for defence against torpedo boats, eight on casemates on the upper deck and four in the superstructure. The ship also carried three 3-pounder Hotchkiss guns and two submerged 18-inch torpedo tubes.

The ship's waterline armour belt had a maximum thickness of 6 inches (152 mm) and was closed off by 5-inch (127 mm) transverse bulkheads. The armour of the gun turrets and their barbettes was 6 inches thick while the casemate armour was 5 inches thick. The protective deck armour ranged in thickness from 1–3 inches (25–76 mm) and the conning tower was protected by 12 inches (305 mm) of armour.

== Construction and service ==
Sutlej, named to commemorate two battles on the Sutlej River during the First Anglo-Sikh War, was laid down by John Brown & Company at their shipyard in Clydebank on 15 August 1898 and launched on 18 November 1899. She was commissioned at Chatham on 6 May 1902 by Captain Paul Bush, to take the place of HMS Diadem in the Channel Squadron, which she joined in late July after steam trials. She took part in the fleet review held at Spithead on 16 August 1902 for the coronation of King Edward VII, and visited the Aegean Sea with other ships of the Channel Squadron for combined manoeuvres with the Mediterranean fleet the following month. In October 1902 she escorted the damaged battleship HMS Hood from Gibraltar to Chatham.

She was later re-assigned to the China Station where along with HMS Iphigenia she was sent to monitor the Russian fleet sailing through the Singapore Strait on the way to the Battle of Tsushima. They arrived too late to do this although they did meet the Russian fleet the following day with Sutlej greeting them with a 17 gun salute. and remained on the China Station until May 1906 when she became a boys' training ship in the North America and West Indies Station. The ship returned home in 1909 and became flagship of the reserve Third Fleet until 1910. Whilst on manoeuvers off Berehaven, Ireland on 15 July, she had a boiler explosion that killed four men.

A few days after the start of the war, Sutlej was assigned to the 9th Cruiser Squadron (CS) for convoy escort duties off the French and Iberian coasts. She was transferred to 11th Cruiser Squadron in Ireland in February 1915 for similar duties. Sent to the Azores in February 1916 and rejoined the 9th CS in September. She was paid off at Devonport on 4 May 1917 and became an accommodation ship. In January 1918 she became a depot ship at Rosyth and was renamed Crescent. She reverted to Sutlej in 1919 before she was sold on 9 May 1921 to Thos. W. Ward and laid up in Belfast. Sutlej arrived at Preston, Lancashire on 15 August 1924 to be broken up.

== Bibliography ==
- Chesneau, Roger & Kolesnik, Eugene M., eds. (1979). Conway's All the World's Fighting Ships 1860–1905. Greenwich: Conway Maritime Press. ISBN 0-8317-0302-4.
- Colledge, J. J.; Warlow, Ben (2006) [1969]. Ships of the Royal Navy: The Complete Record of All Fighting Ships of the Royal Navy from the 15th Century to the Present (3rd Rev ed.). London: Chatham Publishing. ISBN 978-1-86176-281-8. OCLC 67375475.
- Corbett, Julian. Naval Operations to the Battle of the Falklands. History of the Great War: Based on Official Documents. Vol. I (2nd, reprint of the 1938 ed.). London and Nashville, Tennessee: Imperial War Museum and Battery Press. ISBN 0-89839-256-X.
- Friedman, Norman (2012). British Cruisers of the Victorian Era. Barnsley, South Yorkshire, UK: Seaforth. ISBN 978-1-59114-068-9.
- Friedman, Norman (2011). Naval Weapons of World War One. Barnsley, South Yorkshire, UK: Seaforth. ISBN 978-1-84832-100-7.
- Massie, Robert K. (2004). Castles of Steel: Britain, Germany, and the Winning of the Great War at Sea. London: Jonathan Cape. ISBN 0-224-04092-8.
- Silverstone, Paul H. (1984). Directory of the World's Capital Ships. New York: Hippocrene Books. ISBN 0-88254-979-0.
- "Transcript: HMS SUTLEJ - February 1916 to May 1917, Central Atlantic, return to UK". Royal Navy Log Books of the World War 1 Era. Naval-History.net.
