= Wilfred French =

Admiral Sir Wilfred French KCB CMG
- Born: 9 November 1880
- Died: 6 December 1958 (aged 78)
- Military career
- Allegiance: United Kingdom
- Branch: Royal Navy
- Service years: 1890s – 1939
- Rank: Admiral
- Commands: HMS Hood; 2nd Battle Cruiser Squadron; Vice-Admiral-in-charge, Malta; Admiral Commanding, Orkneys and Shetlands
- Conflicts: First World War; Second World War
- Awards: Knight Commander of the Order of the Bath; Companion of the Order of St Michael and St George

Admiral Sir Wilfred Frankland French, KCB, CMG (9 November 1880 – 6 December 1958) was an officer in the British Royal Navy.

== Naval career ==
French entered the Royal Navy in the late 1890s, and was promoted to lieutenant on 1 April 1902. The following month, he was posted to the battleship HMS Goliath, serving at the China station. His career included time as flag captain of HMS Hood (1927–1929); Commanding Officer of the 2nd Battlecruiser Squadron (1931–1932); and Vice-Admiral in charge, Malta, from 1934 to 1937. He received the KCB in 1936.

At the start of the Second World War, French was Admiral Commanding, Orkneys and Shetlands (ACOS). On 14 October 1939, the anchorage of Scapa Flow was infiltrated by the German submarine U-47, which sank the battleship HMS Royal Oak with the loss of 833 lives. The official report into the disaster cast blame for the weak defences at Scapa on French. Despite having earlier warned of the dangers of attack, and offering to bring a small boat or submarine into the anchorage to prove his point, French was forced to retire from active service, and was posted to Washington as an administrative and maintenance representative, serving there until 1944.

== Sources ==
- Weaver, H.J. (1980). Nightmare at Scapa Flow: The truth about the sinking of HMS Royal Oak. England: Cressrelles. ISBN 0-85956-025-2.

Military offices
Preceded by Matthew Best	Flag Officer, Malta; 1934–1937	Succeeded by Sir Wilbraham Ford
Preceded by New post	Admiral Commanding, Orkneys and Shetlands; July 1939–December 1939	Succeeded by Sir Hugh Binney
