= Naval War College (South Korea) =

Naval War College is a college located in Yuseong-gu, South Korea.
