= Herbert King-Hall =

Royal Navy Admiral; Commander-in-Chief, Cape of Good Hope Station (1862-1936)

Admiral Sir Herbert King-Hall KCB CVO DSO
- Born: 15 March 1862
- Died: 20 October 1936 (aged 74)
- Military career
- Allegiance: United Kingdom
- Branch: Royal Navy
- Service years: 1875–1919
- Rank: Admiral
- Commands: HMS Endymion; HMS Indomitable; Cape of Good Hope Station
- Conflicts: Anglo-Egyptian War; Second Boer War; World War I
- Awards: Knight Commander of the Order of the Bath; Commander of the Royal Victorian Order; Distinguished Service Order
- Spouse: Lady Mabel Emily Murray (m. 1905)
- Father: Admiral Sir William King-Hall
- Relatives: Admiral Sir George King-Hall (brother); Stephen King-Hall (nephew); Magdalen King-Hall (niece)

Admiral Sir Herbert Goodenough King-Hall, KCB, CVO, DSO (15 March 1862 – 20 October 1936) was a Royal Navy officer who served as Commander-in-Chief, Cape of Good Hope Station.

== Naval career ==
Born the son of Admiral Sir William King-Hall, Herbert King-Hall joined the Royal Navy in 1875. He fought in the Anglo-Egyptian War in 1882, and later commanded the special service vessel HMS Hearty. Promoted to captain in 1900, he took part in the Second Boer War and was mentioned in despatches. After the war ended in June 1902, King-Hall stayed in South Africa as Principal Transport Officer at Cape Town. He was appointed in command of HMS Endymion in 1903. King-Hall was appointed assistant director of Naval Intelligence in 1905 and was given command of HMS Indomitable in 1908. Promoted to Rear-Admiral in 1909, he became Second-in-Command of the 2nd Battle Squadron before being appointed Commander-in-Chief, Cape of Good Hope Station in 1913 and serving in that role during World War I. He led the operation to successfully destroy and then sink SMS Königsberg on the Rufiji River in Tanzania in July 1915. He was appointed a Knight Commander of the Order of the Bath in the 1916 New Year Honours. His last appointment was as Admiral Commanding, Orkneys and Shetlands in 1918.

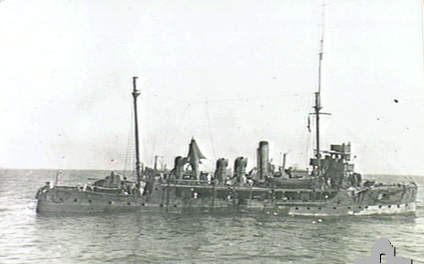
RN Bramble class gunboat involved in the blockade of SMS Königsberg

== Family ==
In 1905 he married Lady Mabel Emily Murray, daughter of Viscount Stormont (son of William Murray, 4th Earl of Mansfield). His older brother was Admiral Sir George King-Hall, his nephew the naval officer, writer, politician and playwright Stephen King-Hall, his niece the novelist, journalist and children's fiction writer Magdalen King-Hall.

Military offices
Preceded by Captain Stuart Nicholson	Assistant Director Naval Intelligence (Foreign division); 1906–1908	Succeeded by Captain William Lowther Grant
Preceded by Sir Paul Bush	Commander-in-Chief, Cape of Good Hope Station; 1913–1916	Succeeded by Sir Edward Charlton
Preceded by Sir Frederic Brock	Admiral Commanding, Orkneys and Shetlands; 1918–1919	Succeeded by Sir Robert Prendergast
