= Paul Bush (Royal Navy officer) =

Royal Navy Vice-Admiral (1855–1930)

Admiral Sir Paul Bush KCB MVO
- Born: 21 September 1855; Duloe, Cornwall
- Died: 15 March 1930 (aged 74)
- Military career
- Allegiance: United Kingdom
- Branch: Royal Navy
- Service years: 1859–1916
- Rank: Admiral
- Commands: HMS St George; HMS Sutlej; Cape of Good Hope Station
- Conflicts: Mahdist War
- Awards: Knight Commander of the Order of the Bath; Member of the Royal Victorian Order

Admiral Sir Paul Warner Bush KCB MVO (21 September 1855 – 15 March 1930) was a Royal Navy officer who went on to be Commander-in-Chief, Cape of Good Hope Station.

== Naval career ==
Bush joined the Royal Navy in 1859. Promoted to lieutenant in 1877, he served at the Battle of Tokar in February 1884 during the Mahdist War and received the Order of Osminieh (Fourth Class). Promoted to captain in 1897, Bush was given a command of the protected cruiser HMS St George on 26 February 1901. In May the following year, he was appointed in command of the armored cruiser HMS Sutlej on her first commission, for the Channel Squadron. He was appointed Commander-in-Chief, Cape of Good Hope Station in 1910 and retired in 1916.

== Family ==
In 1900 he married Rachel Adela Bond. They went on to have four children: three sons, and a daughter:

- George Victor Denis Cromwell (1901)
- Ronald Paul (1902)
- Geoffrey Russell (1904)
- Selina Rachel (1910)

Military offices
Preceded by Sir George Egerton	Commander-in-Chief, Cape of Good Hope Station; 1910–1913	Succeeded by Sir Herbert King-Hall
