= Stanley Colville =

Royal Navy Admiral (1861–1939)

Admiral The Honourable Sir Stanley Colville GCB GCMG GCVO
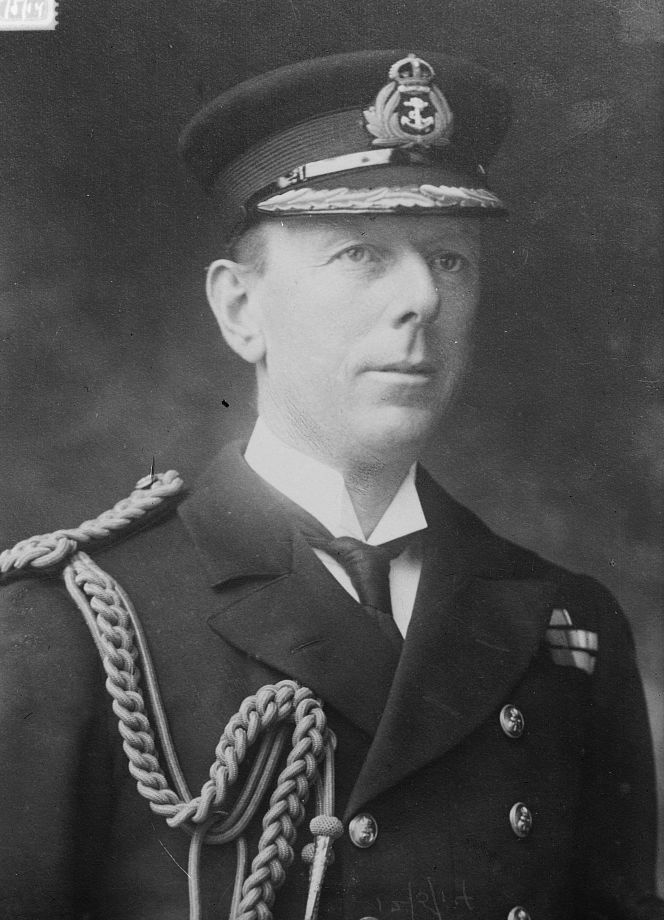
- Admiral Sir Stanley Colville as a captain in 1905 or 1906

Vice-Admiral of the United Kingdom and Lieutenant of the Admiralty
- In office March 1929 – 9 April 1939

Rear-Admiral of the United Kingdom
- In office January 1927 – March 1929

First and Principal Naval Aide-de-Camp to HM The King
- In office July 1919 – August 1922

Commander-in-Chief, Portsmouth
- In office February 1916 – March 1919

Admiral Commanding, Orkneys and Shetlands
- In office September 1914 – January 1916

Vice-Admiral Commanding, 1st Battle Squadron
- In office June 1912 – June 1914

Rear-Admiral Commanding, 1st Cruiser Squadron
- In office February 1909 – March 1911

Personal details
- Born: The Hon Stanley Cecil James Colville; 21 February 1861 Eaton Place, London, England
- Died: 9 April 1939 (aged 78)
- Spouse: Adelaide Jane Meade (m. 1902)
- Parent: Charles Colville (father)
- Relatives: Robert Carrington (maternal grandfather)
- Military career
- Allegiance: United Kingdom
- Branch: Royal Navy
- Service years: 1874–1922
- Rank: Admiral
- Commands: Portsmouth Command (1916–19); Orkneys and Shetlands (1914–16); 1st Battle Squadron (1912–14); 1st Cruiser Squadron (1909–11); HMS Hindustan (1905–06); HMS Crescent (1900–02); HMS Barfleur (1898–00)
- Conflicts: Anglo-Zulu War; Anglo-Egyptian War; Bombardment of Alexandria; Mahdist War; First World War
- Awards: Knight Grand Cross of the Order of the Bath; Knight Grand Cross of the Order of St Michael and St George; Knight Grand Cross of the Royal Victorian Order

Admiral Sir Stanley Cecil James Colville, GCB, GCMG, GCVO (21 February 1861 – 9 April 1939) was a senior Royal Navy officer.

== Naval career ==
Colville was born in Eaton Place, London, the second son of Charles Colville, 10th Lord Colville of Culross, entitling him to the style "The Honourable". His mother, Cecile, was the daughter of Robert Carrington, 2nd Baron Carrington. Colville was educated at Marlborough College and entered the training ship Britannia in July 1874. In October 1876 he was promoted midshipman and appointed to the battleship Sultan in the Mediterranean Fleet. In May 1878 he transferred to the battleship Black Prince in the Channel Fleet and in January 1879 to the corvette Boadicea at the Cape of Good Hope Station. Later that year he served on land during the Anglo-Zulu War. In October 1880 he was commissioned sub-lieutenant and posted to Portsmouth for further training.

In July 1882 he joined the battleship Alexandra, flagship of the Mediterranean Fleet. He was promoted lieutenant in November 1882 for his services at the bombardment of Alexandria. In May 1883 he joined the corvette Canada on the North American Station, serving alongside Midshipman Prince George of Wales (later King George V). In September 1884 he rejoined Alexandra and served ashore with the force attempting to relieve General Charles George Gordon at Khartoum. In October 1889 he joined the sloop Buzzard on the North America Station.

In August 1890 he was appointed First Lieutenant of the royal yacht Victoria and Albert. He was promoted commander in August 1892 and in May 1893 joined the battleship Trafalgar, now flagship of the Mediterranean Fleet. In 1896 he took command of the gunboats of the Nile Flotilla in Sudan. He was badly wounded, promoted captain in August 1896, and appointed Companion of the Order of the Bath (CB) in November 1896.

From 1897 to 1898 he was Naval Adviser to the Inspector-General of Fortifications at the War Office in London. In September 1898 he took command of the battleship Barfleur as Flag Captain to Rear-Admiral Penrose Fitzgerald, second-in-command of the China Station. On 1 March 1900 he was appointed Flag Captain to Vice-Admiral Sir Frederick Bedford in the cruiser Crescent on the North America and West Indies Station. In May 1902 he became Chief of Staff to Admiral Sir Compton Domvile, commander-in-chief of the Mediterranean Fleet, in the battleship Bulwark. He was appointed Commander of the Royal Victorian Order (CVO) when received in an audience by King Edward VII on 29 May 1902, and later the same year married the daughter of recently retired Admiral of the Fleet Lord Clanwilliam. In December 1905 he took command of the battleship Hindustan in the Atlantic Fleet and was appointed an Aide-de-camp to the King.

Colville was promoted rear-admiral in November 1906 and hoisted his flag in the Bulwark, now in the Home Fleet. In February 1909 he was appointed to command the 1st Cruiser Squadron of the Channel Fleet in HMS Drake. In July 1909 he transferred his flag to the new battlecruiser Indomitable. He was promoted vice-admiral in April 1911. In June 1912 he took command of the 1st Battle Squadron of the Home Fleet, flying his flag in HMS Collingwood and was appointed Knight Commander of the Order of the Bath (KCB). In September 1914 he became Vice-Admiral Commanding, Orkneys and Shetlands and was shortly afterwards promoted admiral. He held this command until February 1916, when he was appointed Commander-in-Chief, Portsmouth. He was appointed Knight Grand Cross of the Royal Victorian Order (GCVO) in July 1915, and Knight Grand Cross of the Order of St Michael and St George (GCMG) in 1919. In July 1919 he was appointed First and Principal Naval Aide-de-Camp to the King, a post he held until his retirement in April 1922. He was appointed Knight Grand Cross of the Order of the Bath (GCB) in July 1921.

He was appointed to the honorary offices of Rear-Admiral of the United Kingdom in 1927 and Vice-Admiral of the United Kingdom and Lieutenant of the Admiralty in 1929.

== Family ==
Colville married at St Peter's Church, Eaton Square on 6 December 1902 Lady Adelaide Jane Meade (1877 – 31 March 1960), a daughter of Richard Meade, 4th Earl of Clanwilliam. The marriage was attended by the Prince of Wales (later King George V) and a number of royal family members, and the couple received gifts from the King and Queen. They had four children, including Major-General Edward Charles Colville (1 September 1905 – 10 January 1982).

== Footnotes ==
Military offices
New command	Admiral Commanding, Orkneys and Shetlands; 1914–1916	Succeeded by Sir Frederic Brock
Preceded by Sir Hedworth Meux	Commander-in-Chief, Portsmouth; 1916–1919	Succeeded by Sir Cecil Burney
Honorary titles
Preceded by Sir Henry Jackson	First and Principal Naval Aide-de-Camp; 1919–1922	Succeeded by Sir Charles Madden
Preceded by Sir Edmund Fremantle	Rear-Admiral of the United Kingdom; 1926–1929	Succeeded by Sir Montague Browning
Preceded by Sir Francis Bridgeman	Vice-Admiral of the United Kingdom; 1929–1939	Succeeded by Sir Montague Browning
