= Royal Naval War College =

- Active: 1900–1914
- Country: United Kingdom
- Branch: Royal Navy
- Type: Training
- Role: War college
- Garrison/HQ: Greenwich, Devonport, Portsmouth

Commanders
- Ceremonial chief: Commander Royal Naval War College

The Royal Naval War College was a training establishment for senior officers of the Royal Navy that existed from 1900 to 1914. It was based originally at Greenwich, then Plymouth, then Portsmouth, and then Greenwich again. Branch colleges were also based at Chatham and Plymouth prior to the First World War.

== Early history ==
A "War Course for Captains and Commanders" was inaugurated at the Royal Naval College, Greenwich in November 1900. The course moved to Devonport in 1905 and to Portsmouth in 1906, being officially named the Royal Naval War College in 1907. It catered for flag officers, captains and commanders. Courses included training in tactical naval war games, strategic naval war games, studying and writing reports on various problems and lectures on various subjects. The college's functions were to have been returned to Greenwich in 1914.

== In Command, Royal Naval War College ==
Included:

- Rear-Admiral Henry J. May, 18 September 1900
- Captain Edmond J. W. Slade, 13 May 1904 – 31 October 1907
- Rear-Admiral Robert S. Lowry, 1 November 1907 – 26 November 1908
- Rear-Admiral Lewis Bayly, 27 November 1908 – 23 February 1911
- Vice-Admiral Sir Henry B. Jackson, 24 February 1911 – 28 January 1913
- Vice-Admiral the Hon. Sir Alexander E. Bethell, February 1913 – August 1914

== Flag Captains Royal Naval War College ==
Included:

- Captain George P. W. Hope, 1 February 1908 – 24 March 1909
- Captain Charles F. Thorp, 24 March 1909 – 1 December 1911
- Captain Richard Webb, 2 April 1912 – 16 August 1913
- Captain Charles E. Le Mesurier, 16 August 1913 – July, 1914

== Sources ==
- Harley, Simon (2017). "War Course Attendance at Greenwich from 1900 to 1904". The Mariner's Mirror. 103 (4): 471–474. doi:10.1080/00253359.2017.1348040. S2CID 165482836.
