= King Edward VII-class battleship =

Pre-dreadnought battleship class of the British Royal Navy

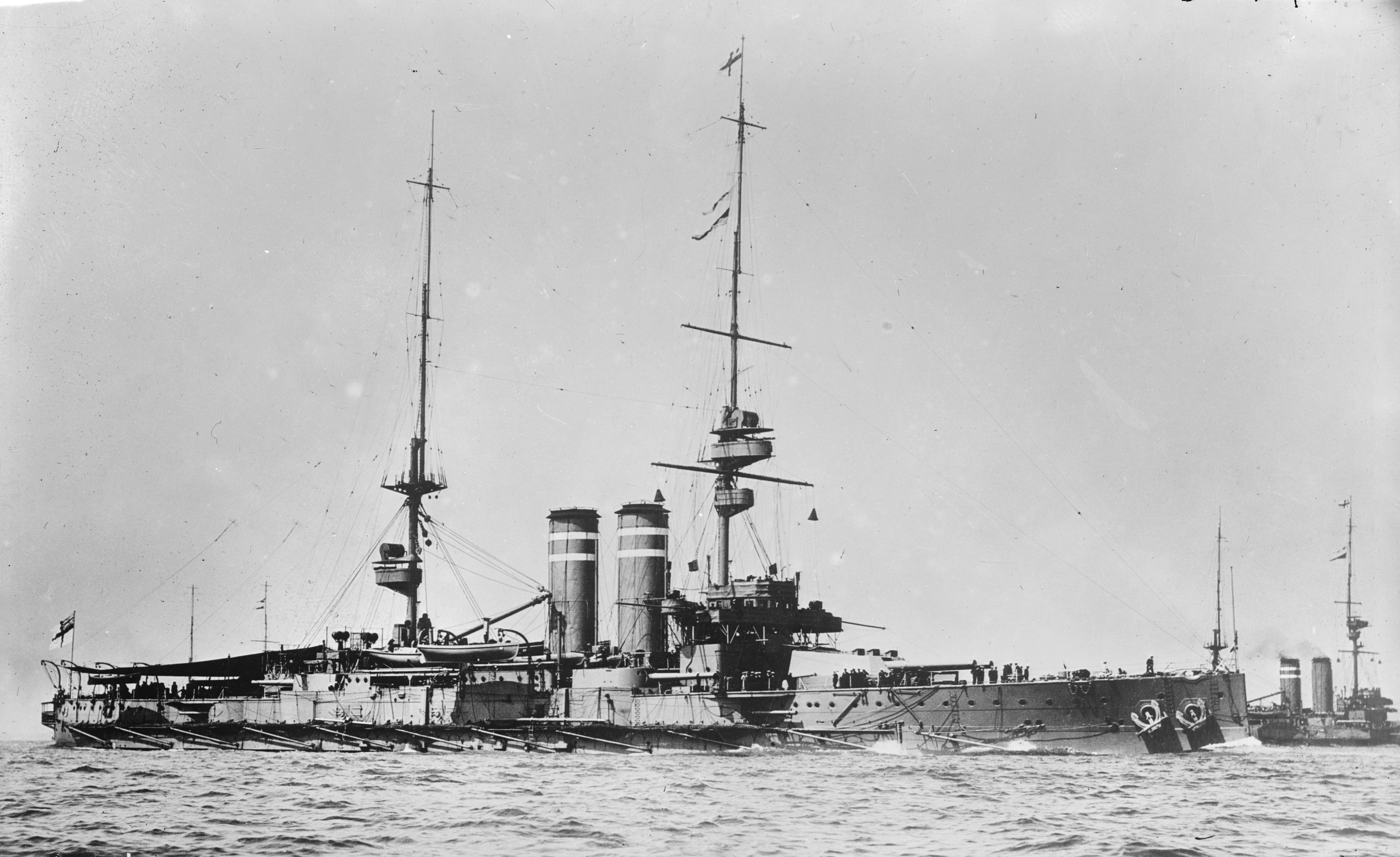
- HMS King Edward VII, lead ship of the King Edward VII class.

Class overview
- Name: King Edward VII class
- Builders: Devonport Dockyard (2); Portsmouth Dockyard (2); Chatham Dockyard (1); John Brown & Co. (1); Fairfield Shipbuilding & Eng. (1); Vickers (1)
- Operators: Royal Navy
- Preceded by: Duncan class
- Succeeded by: Swiftsure class
- Built: 1902–1906
- In service: 1905–1921
- Completed: 8
- Lost: 2
- Retired: 6

General characteristics
- Class & type: Pre-dreadnought battleship
- Displacement: Normal: 15,585 to 15,885 long tons (15,835 to 16,140 t); Full load: 17,009 to 17,290 long tons (17,282 to 17,567 t)
- Length: 453 ft 9 in (138.3 m) (loa)
- Beam: 75 ft (22.9 m)
- Draught: 25 ft 8 in (7.82 m)
- Installed power: 16 water-tube boilers; 18,000 ihp (13,420 kW)
- Propulsion: 2 × triple-expansion steam engines; 2 × screw propellers
- Speed: 18.5 knots (34.3 km/h; 21.3 mph)
- Complement: 777
- Armament: 4 × BL 12 in (305 mm) Mk IX guns; 4 × BL 9.2 in (234 mm) Mk X guns; 10 × BL 6 in (152 mm) Mk VII guns; 14 × 12-pounder 3 in (76 mm) guns; 14 × 3-pounder 47 mm (1.9 in) guns; 4 × 18 in (457 mm) torpedo tubes (submerged)
- Armour: Belt: 9 in (229 mm); Bulkheads: 8–12 in (203–305 mm); Barbettes: 12 in; Turrets: Main battery: 8–12 in; 9.2-inch battery: 5–9 in (127–229 mm); Casemates: 7 in (178 mm); Conning tower: 12 in; Decks: 1–2.5 in (25–64 mm)

The King Edward VII class was a class of eight pre-dreadnought battleships launched by the Royal Navy between 1903 and 1905. The class comprised King Edward VII, the lead ship, Commonwealth, Hindustan, Britannia, Dominion, New Zealand, Africa, and Hibernia. They marked the first major development of the basic pre-dreadnought type that had been developed with the Majestic type of the mid-1890s, all of which had been designed by the Director of Naval Construction, William Henry White, with the primary innovation being the adoption of a heavy secondary battery of four 9.2-inch (234 mm) guns to supplement the standard main battery of four 12 in (305 mm) guns. The King Edward VIIs were among the last pre-dreadnoughts built for the Royal Navy before the construction and launch of the revolutionary battleship HMS Dreadnought in 1906, which immediately rendered them obsolescent.

The ships served with the Atlantic Fleet from 1905 to 1907, when they were transferred to the Channel Fleet, though this service lasted only until 1908–1909, when they were reassigned to the Home Fleet. During this period, King Edward VII served as fleet flagship as a result of a request from her namesake that she always serve as such. In 1911, New Zealand was renamed Zealandia. Africa and Hibernia were involved with experiments with seaplanes in 1912, and that year all members of the class were assigned to the 3rd Battle Squadron of the Home Fleet and were later sent to the Mediterranean Sea to respond to the First Balkan War.

By the outbreak of the First World War in August 1914, the King Edward VIIs were sent to the Grand Fleet to support the Northern Patrol and to conduct sweeps in the North Sea for German warships, though they never saw combat. In January 1916, King Edward VII struck a German naval mine and sank, though her crew was safely evacuated. By mid-1916, the surviving ships were no longer suitable for front-line fleet service, and so they were dispersed to other tasks, including coastal defence with the Nore Command and for operations in the Gallipoli Campaign. Africa was sent to the Atlantic Patrol in 1917 and was later stricken with Spanish flu, and Britannia was torpedoed and sunk by a German U-boat two days before the end of the war, one of the last British warships to be sunk in the conflict. The surviving members of the class were all sold for scrap in the early 1920s.

== Design ==
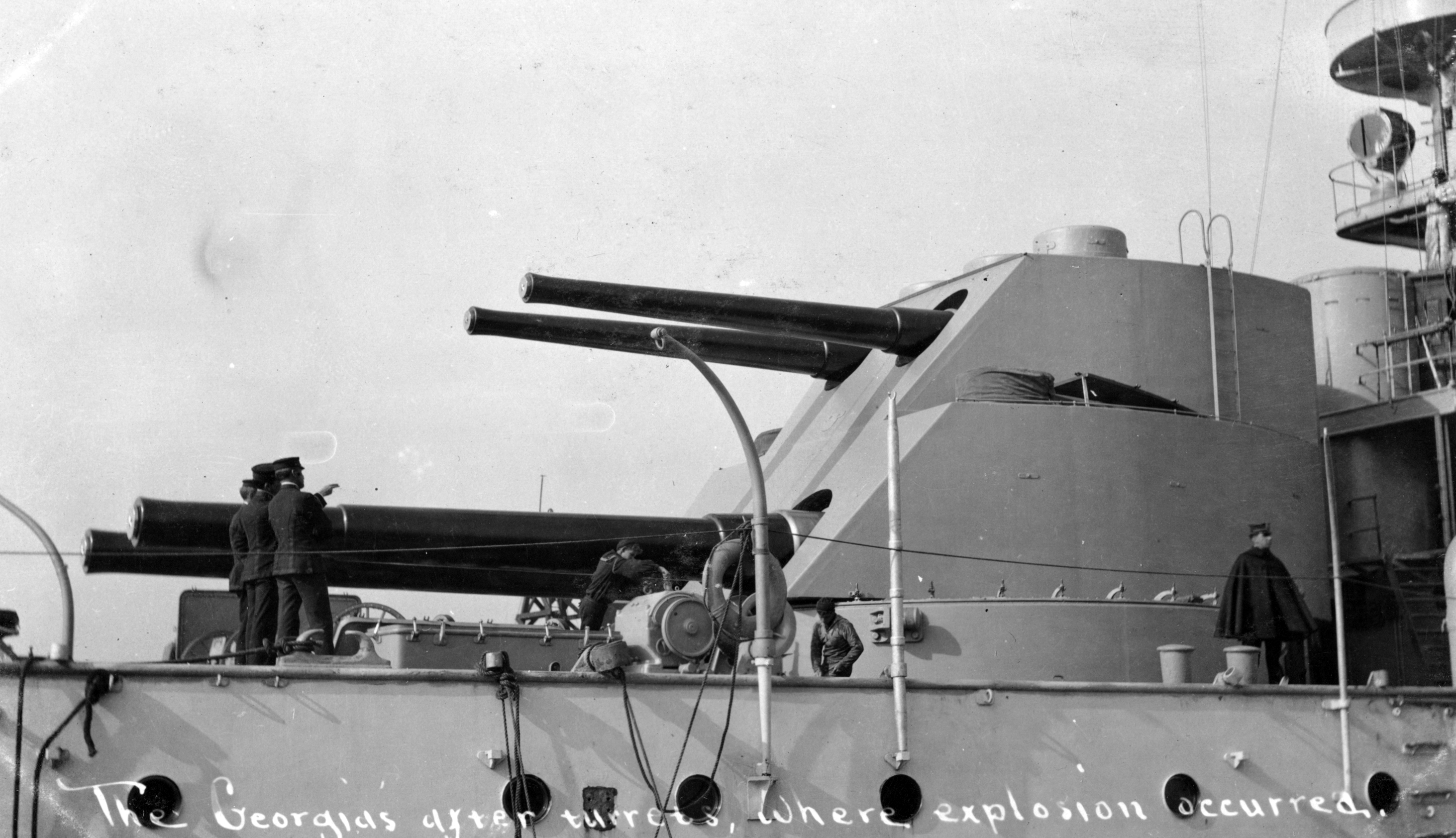
The superimposed secondary battery of 8-inch guns aboard USS Georgia that influenced the design of the King Edward VII class

Design work on what would become the King Edward VII class began in 1901; the Royal Navy had observed that foreign battleships, such as the Italian Regina Margherita class and the American Virginia class, had begun to carry a heavy secondary battery of 8-inch (203 mm) guns. The design staff, operating without the direction of the Director of Naval Construction, William Henry White, who was ill at the time, began a series of studies for a battleship based on the preceding London class armed with a secondary battery of 7.5 in (190 mm) or 9.2 in (234 mm) guns. The Assistant DNC, J. H. Narbeth, initially had a great deal of trouble arranging the guns such that the secondary turrets did not interfere with the main battery guns. After examining the directly superimposed turrets used in the Virginias, Narbeth concluded that it was not a workable solution, and so adopted an arrangement with four secondary turrets, one at each corner of the superstructure.

The Admiralty provisionally accepted a draft equipped with eight 7.5 in guns in twin gun turrets, but after White returned, he suggested the 9.2 in guns would be more effective against heavily armoured ships, and so the decision was made to switch to that armament. The heavy secondary guns added a great deal of weight high in the ship and they took up space on the deck, thus forcing the designers to make compromises to other aspects of the vessels, particularly the rest of the secondary battery. These guns, traditionally carried in casemates, were relocated to a central box battery, since it would require less armour to protect the guns in such a compact arrangement. They were also mounted lower relative to the waterline, owing to the decreased freeboard; this rendered the guns essentially unusable in anything but relatively calm seas. Combined with a higher metacentric height, the low freeboard of the King Edward VIIs made them prone to shipping water in heavy seas and excessive rolling.

Despite the problems with their secondary armament, the ships were significantly more powerful than earlier British battleships and they compared well with foreign contemporaries. They nevertheless suffered the same fate as all late pre-dreadnought battleships. Completed shortly before the advent of the all-big-gun HMS Dreadnought in 1906, they were quickly rendered obsolescent, such that during the First World War, the King Edward VII-class ships were frequently deployed at the front of the dreadnought battle squadrons to screen them for naval mines, either by sighting or striking them before the dreadnoughts entered the area.

The King Edward VII class was the culmination of battleship design under the direction of White that had begun with the Royal Sovereign class in the late 1880s. The follow-on class, the two Lord Nelsons, were a major departure from previous designs and marked a transitional stage between pre-dreadnought and dreadnought-type battleships.

=== General characteristics ===
Line-drawing of the King Edward VII class

The ships of the King Edward VII class were 425 feet (130 m) long between perpendiculars and 453 ft 9 in (138.30 m) long overall. They had a beam of 75 ft (23 m) and a draft of 25 ft 8 in (7.82 m). The King Edward VII-class ships were more than a thousand tons heavier than earlier battleships displacing 15,585 to 15,885 long tons (15,835 to 16,140 t) normally and up to 17,009 to 17,290 long tons (17,282 to 17,567 t) fully loaded. The ships had 22 ft (6.7 m) of freeboard forward, 16 ft 6.5 in (5.042 m) amidships, and 18 ft (5.5 m) aft. To save weight, the ships had their storage for food and other supplies reduced from a 4-month supply that was standard in previous designs to 3 months. Their crew varied over the course of their careers, ranging from 755 to 815; for example, after entering service, Dominion had a crew of 777 officers and ratings; crews tended to increase during wartime.

King Edward VII and her sister ships discarded the aft conning tower that was standard practice in favour of a torpedo control tower that directed the firing of the stern torpedo tubes. The ships were fitted with two heavy pole masts; their foremasts were equipped with tops used to mount wireless telegraphy and fire control equipment. King Edward VII, Commonwealth, Dominion, Hindustan, and New Zealand carried large, oval tops for most of their equipment and a smaller top below, while Africa, Hibernia, and Britannia had smaller, square tops, with two small tops lower on the masts.

The King Edward VIIs were the first British battleships with balanced rudders since the 1870s and were very manoeuvrable, with a tactical diameter of 340 yards (310 m) at 15 knots (28 km/h; 17 mph). However, they were difficult to keep on a straight course, and this characteristic led to them being nicknamed "the Wobbly Eight" during their 1914–1916 service in the Grand Fleet. They had a slightly faster roll than previous British battleship classes, but were good gun platforms, although very wet in bad weather.

=== Machinery ===
The King Edward VII-class ships were powered by a pair of 4-cylinder triple-expansion engines that drove two inward-turning screws, with steam provided by water-tube or fire-tube boilers of various types. King Edward VII had ten Babcock & Wilcox boilers and six Scotch marine boilers, while Africa, Britannia, Hindustan, and Hibernia received eighteen Babcock & Wilcox boilers and three cylindrical return tube boilers. New Zealand used eighteen Niclausse boilers and three of the cylindrical return tube boilers, and Dominion and Commonwealth had sixteen of the Babcock & Wilcox boilers only. The reason multiple boiler arrangements were adopted was to compare the effectiveness of different boiler types. In service, the ships with mixed boiler types proved to be something of a disappointment, since the differing boiler types added complications to the powerplant and hampered efficient operation; they produced no benefit in return, and the experiments were not repeated in subsequent designs. The boilers were trunked into two funnels located amidships. Primarily powered by coal, all of the class except New Zealand had oil sprayers installed during construction, the first time this had been done in British battleships. These allowed steam pressure to be rapidly increased, improving the acceleration of the ships; this ability later led to the decision to adopt all oil-fired boilers in the Queen Elizabeth-class super-dreadnoughts. New Zealand's Niclausse boilers could not be adapted to use the oil sprayers.

The King Edward VII-class ships had a top speed of 18.5 knots (34.3 km/h; 21.3 mph) from 18,000 indicated horsepower (13,000 kW), though some of the ships exceeded 19 knots (35 km/h; 22 mph) on speed trials, including Dominion and Hindustan. Using only coal, the ships had a cruising radius of about 5,100 nmi (9,400 km; 5,900 mi) at an economical speed of 10 knots (19 km/h; 12 mph), and with the supplemental fuel oil, their range increased to 6,700 nmi (12,400 km; 7,700 mi).

=== Armament ===
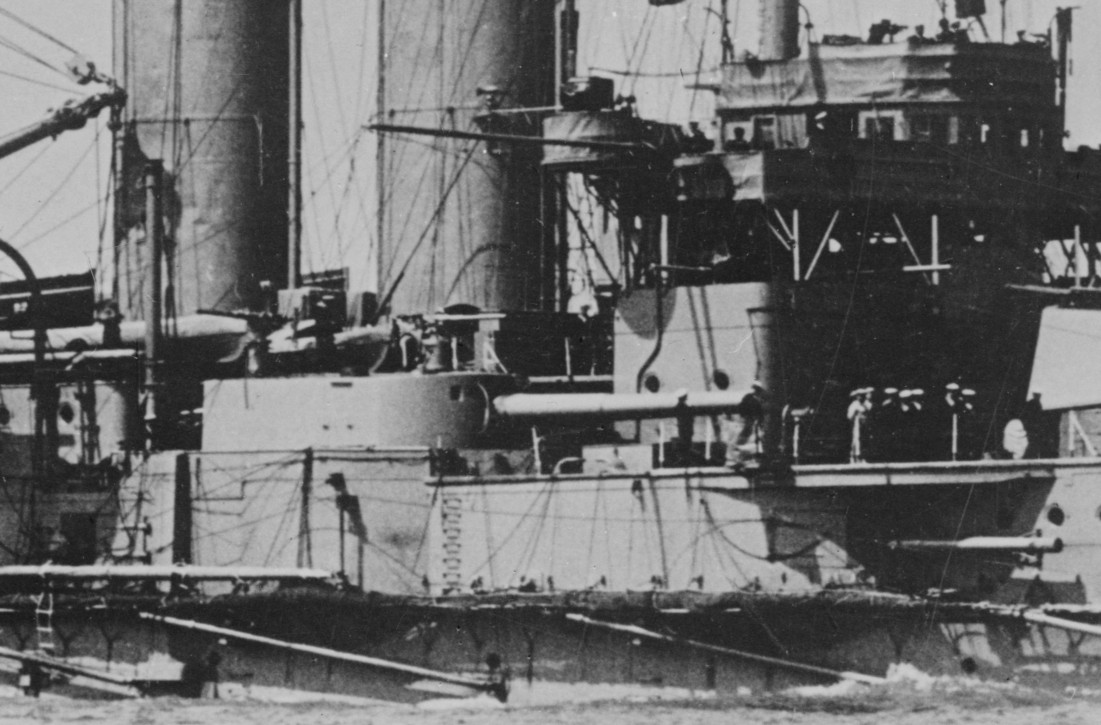
One of King Edward VII's 9.2-inch gun turrets

The King Edward VIIs had four 12-inch 40-calibre Mk IX guns mounted in twin-gun turrets fore and aft. The guns were carried in BVIIS-type mountings, which had a range of elevation from −5 degrees to +13.5 degrees and allowed loading the guns at any angle. The guns had a muzzle velocity of 2,610 feet per second (800 m/s), and they were capable of penetrating 12 inches of Krupp armour at a range of 4,800 yards (4,400 m). At their maximum elevation, the guns had a range of 15,300 yards (14,000 m). Commonwealth and Zealandia later had their mounts modified to allow elevation to 30 degrees, which extended their maximum range significantly, to 26,514 yd (24,244 m). These were supported by a heavy secondary battery of four 9.2 in (234 mm) guns in four single turrets, two on each broadside. The guns were carried in Mk VS mounts, which had a range of elevation from −7 to +15 degrees, allowing for a maximum range of 15,500 yd (14,200 m). Muzzle velocity was 2,735 to 2,751 ft/s (834 to 839 m/s).

The first five ships also mounted ten 6-inch (152 mm) Mark VII 45-calibre guns, the same battery carried by earlier British battleships, though unlike earlier battleships, the King Edward VIIs mounted these guns in a central battery rather than in casemates. The guns had a muzzle velocity of 2,536 ft/s (773 m/s), and they could penetrate six inches of Krupp armour at 2,500 yards (2,300 m). Maximum elevation was 14 degrees, which allowed the guns to engage targets out to 12,000 yards (11,000 m). The last three ships (Britannia, Africa and Hibernia) were instead fitted with 6-inch 50 calibre guns, which had been ordered for the Warrior-class armoured cruisers, but were surplus when it was decided to complete the Warriors with a secondary armament of 7.5 in (190 mm) guns. For defence against torpedo boats, they carried fourteen 12-pounder 3 in (76 mm) guns and fourteen 3-pounder 47 mm (1.9 in) guns that were dispersed in pivot mounts around the ship. As was customary for battleships of the period, they were also equipped with five 18-inch (457 mm) torpedo tubes submerged in the hull; two were on each broadside, with the fifth in the stern.

=== Armour ===
Most of the heavy armour of the King Edward VII class consisted of Krupp cemented armour; this included most of the belt armour, main and secondary turrets and their barbettes, and the conning tower. The armour layout of the King Edward VII class was very similar to the protection scheme used in the Duncan and London classes, with the primary change being the adoption of the armoured box for the 6-inch guns, rather than individual, armoured casemates. They had an armoured belt that was 9 inches (229 mm) thick in the main portion of the belt; the transverse bulkhead on the aft end of the belt was 9 to 12 in (229 to 305 mm) thick. Aft of the transverse bulkhead, the side of the ship was protected with 2 in (51 mm) of Krupp non-cemented plate. Forward of the fore barbette, the belt was reduced to 7 in (178 mm), then tapered to 5 in (127 mm), then to 3 in (76 mm) at the extreme end of the bow. The upper edge of the main belt was reduced to 8 in (203 mm) thick, and above that was the battery deck for the 6-inch guns, which was protected with 7-inch-thick plate. The guns in the battery were divided with Krupp non-cemented screens.

The armoured deck was 2 in of mild steel, apart from the central portion of the hull, where it was reduced to 1 in (25 mm) and raised a deck level to the roof of the central battery. The reduction in thickness there was necessary to reduce topweight. The ships' main battery turrets had sides that were 8 to 12 inches thick, mounted atop 12-inch-thick barbettes. The 9.2-inch guns received thinner armour protection, with 5- to 9-inch sides; their barbettes were only 4 in (102 mm) thick, and they were reduced in height on the assumption that the side armour provided sufficient protection, and the likelihood of a shell exploding below the barbette in the ammunition hoists was very small. The conning tower had 12-inch sides.

=== Modifications ===
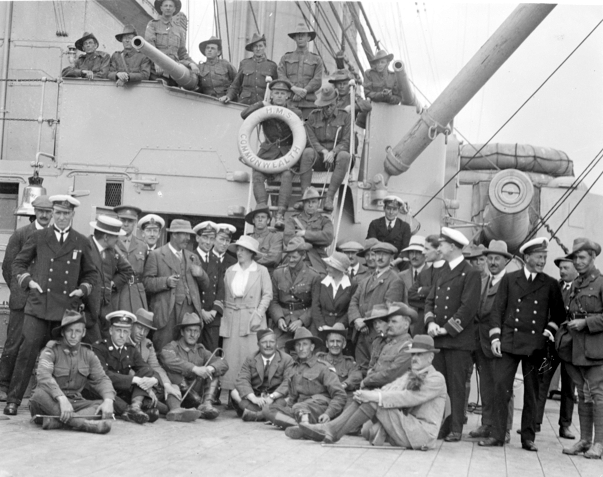
Australian soldiers touring HMS Commonwealth in 1919; note the 6-inch gun now in an open pivot mount on the upper deck

The ships of the King Edward VII class underwent a series of modifications over the courses of their careers. In 1907, King Edward VII had some of her 12-pounder guns temporarily relocated to the main battery turret roofs, but this was found to be unsatisfactory and they reverted to their original locations that same year. Between 1907 and 1908, she and Commonwealth, Dominion, Hindustan, and New Zealand had their bridge-mounted 3-pounders removed. They also received search lights in various positions, including the 9.2-inch turret roofs and the bridge wings. Funnel identification bands were added to all eight ships as well. Hibernia and Hindustan received rangefinders on their aft superstructure in 1911–1912, and most of the ships had further alterations to their search lights. Africa had experimental aircraft launching ramps installed on her bow in 1912 for flight tests, though the equipment was later transferred to Hibernia that year, from which it was removed altogether.

After the start of the First World War in August 1914, Zealandia (ex-New Zealand) gave one of her 12-pounders to arm a Q-ship, receiving a pair of 3-pounders in its place. During a refit in that period, Dominion's bridge was enlarged. The 6-inch battery was removed from all of the ships of the class between 1916 and April 1917, with each ship having four of the guns re-mounted a deck higher in open pivot mounts in place of the 12-pounder guns that had been located there, where they were less affected by heavy seas, and thus, were more usable weapons. Additional search lights were installed during this period as well.

In 1918, Zealandia and Commonwealth were heavily modernised for use as gunnery training ships. Their pole masts were replaced with heavy tripod masts that were capable of supporting the latest fire control directors and rangefinders. Their remaining 12-pounder guns were removed and a pair of 3 in (76 mm) anti-aircraft guns were added on the aft superstructure. Commonwealth received anti-torpedo bulges, though Zealandia did not. Commonwealth received dazzle camouflage, and it has been reported that Zealandia was similarly painted, but according to the naval historian R. A. Burt, the "lack of official and photographic evidence rules this out."

== Ships ==
King Edward VII, the first battleship laid down after the beginning of Edward VII's reign, was named for the monarch; the rest of the members of the class were named for the constituent parts of the British Empire, including the Commonwealth of Australia, Dominion of Canada, Hindustan (India), Britannia (the Roman name for Great Britain), New Zealand, the Empire's African colonies, and Hibernia (the Roman name for Ireland).

Construction data
Name	Builder	Laid down	Launched	Completed
King Edward VII	Devonport Dockyard	8 March 1902	23 July 1903	February 1905
Commonwealth	Fairfield Shipbuilding and Engineering Company	17 June 1902	13 May 1903	March 1905
Dominion	Vickers	23 May 1902	25 August 1903	July 1905
Hindustan	John Brown & Company	25 October 1902	19 December 1903	July 1905
Britannia	Portsmouth Dockyard	4 February 1904	10 December 1904	September 1906
New Zealand (Note: New Zealand was renamed as Zealandia in 1911 to release the name for the new battlecruiser HMS New Zealand.)	Portsmouth Dockyard	9 February 1903	4 February 1904	July 1905
Africa	Chatham Dockyard	27 January 1904	20 May 1905	November 1906
Hibernia	Devonport Dockyard	6 January 1904	17 June 1905	January 1907

== Service history ==
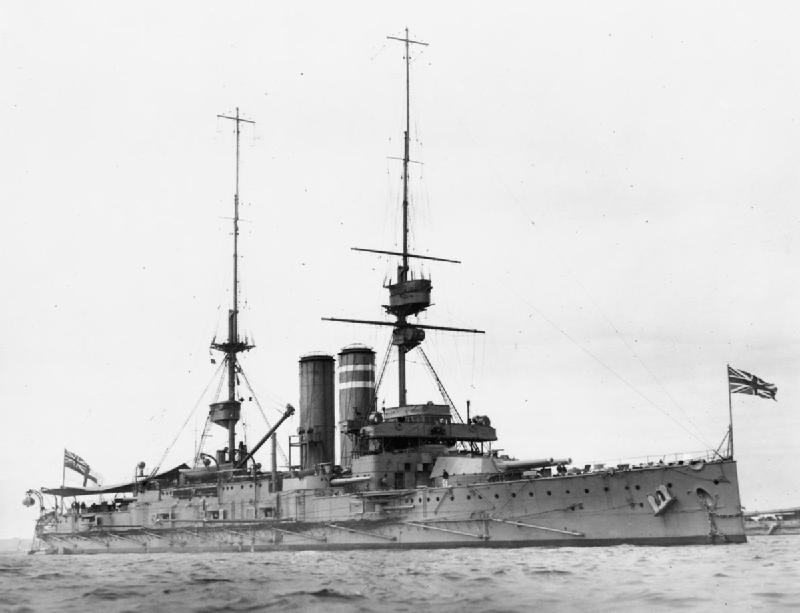
Dominion, c. 1909

As the members of the King Edward VII class entered service beginning in 1905, they joined the Atlantic Fleet, where King Edward VII served as the fleet flagship, per her namesake's request that the ship always be used as a flagship. In 1907, the members of the class were transferred to the Channel Fleet, with King Edward VII again the fleet flagship. King Edward VII and Africa were transferred to the Home Fleet in 1908, and the rest of the class followed them there the next year. New Zealand was renamed Zealandia in 1911 to allow her original name to be used for the battlecruiser New Zealand. Beginning in 1912, the ships were reorganised as the 3rd Battle Squadron, a component of the Home Fleet.

In mid-1912, Africa and Hibernia were involved in tests with the Short Improved S.27 biplane "S.38" flown by Commander Charles Samson; the former was the first British warship to launch an aircraft, and the latter was the first to do so whilst underway. The tests demonstrated the utility of aircraft used to spot the fall of shot and to scout for hostile vessels, but also revealed the impracticability of the equipment available at the time. During the First Balkan War of 1912–1913, the ships of the 3rd Battle Squadron were sent to the Mediterranean Sea to represent British interests in the region; they were involved in an international blockade of Montenegro to protest the Montenegrin occupation of Scutari, which was to be part of the newly created state of Albania. The King Edward VIIs returned to British waters in 1913, where they passed the next year uneventfully.

After Britain entered the First World War on 5 August 1914, the 3rd Battle Squadron was assigned to the Grand Fleet, the main British fleet during the war. The ships were temporarily detached to reinforce the Channel Fleet in November before returning to the Grand Fleet at the end of the month. While serving with the Grand Fleet, the squadron was tasked with conducting operations around Scotland and the North Sea as part of the Northern Patrol. The 3rd Battle Squadron was also involved in patrols of the entire Grand Fleet central North Sea through mid-1915, including in response to the German raid on Scarborough, Hartlepool and Whitby in December 1914 and to support the 1st Battlecruiser Squadron during the Battle of Dogger Bank in January 1915. The 3rd Battle Squadron did not see action against German forces during this period, however. In January 1916, while steaming to Ireland for a refit, King Edward VII struck a mine that had been laid by the German auxiliary cruiser Möwe; the battleship sank slowly enough that her entire crew was taken off, with the exception of one man who fell to his death during the evacuation.

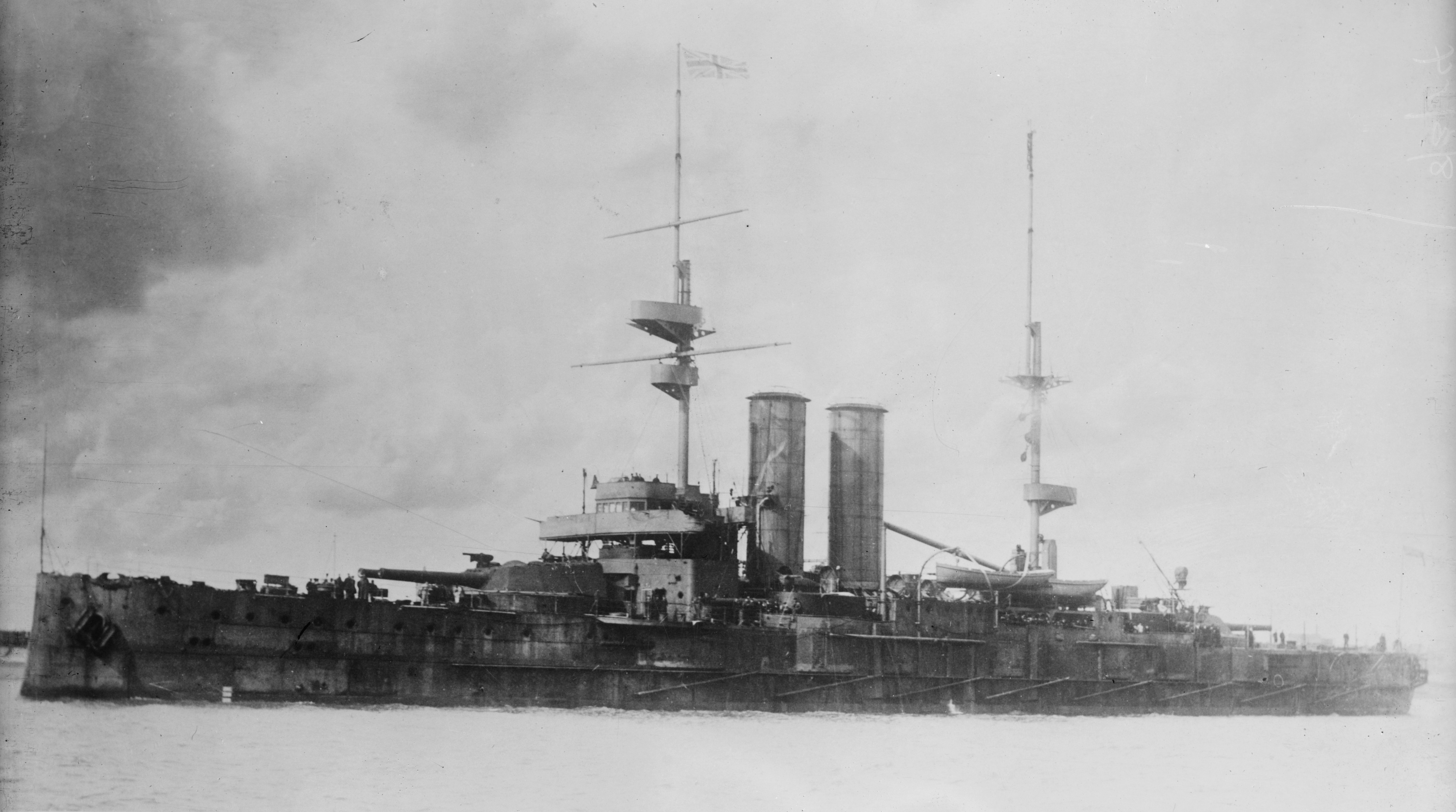
New Zealand at some point between 1905 and 1911

In 1916, the squadron was detached to the Nore Command to guard the British southern coast, and some ships were assigned to other operations elsewhere. Hibernia and Zealandia were sent to the eastern Mediterranean in late 1915 to take part in the Gallipoli Campaign, though they saw little activity there apart from during the evacuation of Allied forces from the peninsula in early 1916. Zealandia returned to the 3rd Battle Squadron after the end of the Gallipoli Campaign. That year, Britannia was sent to the Adriatic Sea to reinforce the Italian Regia Marina (Royal Navy) against the Austro-Hungarian Navy, though she saw no action there. Africa was attached to the 9th Cruiser Squadron for service in the Atlantic Patrol in 1917, tasked with escorting convoys between Sierra Leone and Cape Town, South Africa. Africa's crew was stricken with Spanish flu while she was in Sierra Leone in 1918, with some 476 men reported ill and 52 deaths.

That year, Commonwealth and Zealandia were heavily modernised, with the former being used briefly on the Northern Patrol in 1918 before serving as a gunnery training ship. Zealandia was never actually used as a training ship, but she was involved in fire control experiments and was later used as a barracks ship. Dominion and Hindustan served as depot ships to support the Zeebrugge Raid in 1918. Britannia was torpedoed by the German U-boat UB-50 off Cape Trafalgar on 9 November, just two days before the Armistice with Germany that ended the fighting; she was one of the last British warships to be lost during the war. The torpedo started a serious fire in one of her 9.2-inch magazines, but like King Edward VII, she remained afloat long enough for her crew to be taken off, though some fifty men were killed in the torpedoing and subsequent fire. The six surviving members of the class were sold to ship breakers between 1920 and 1923 and were subsequently broken up for scrap.
