= HMS Africa (1905) =

Pre-dreadnought battleship of the British Royal Navy

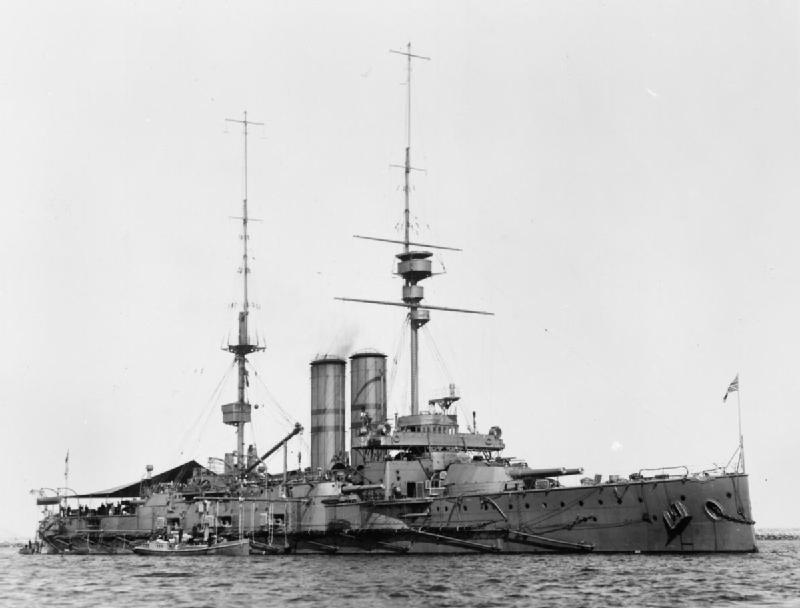
- HMS Africa

History

United Kingdom
- Name: HMS Africa
- Namesake: Africa
- Builder: Chatham Dockyard
- Laid down: 27 January 1904
- Launched: 20 May 1905
- Completed: November 1906
- Commissioned: 6 November 1906
- Decommissioned: November 1918
- Fate: Sold for scrapping, 30 June 1920

General characteristics
- Class & type: King Edward VII-class pre-dreadnought battleship
- Displacement: Normal: 15,585 to 15,885 long tons (15,835 to 16,140 t); Full load: 17,009 to 17,290 long tons (17,282 to 17,567 t)
- Length: 453 ft 9 in (138.3 m) (loa)
- Beam: 75 ft (22.9 m)
- Draught: 25 ft 8 in (7.82 m)
- Installed power: 16 water-tube boilers; 18,000 ihp (13,420 kW)
- Propulsion: 2 × triple-expansion steam engines; 2 × screw propellers
- Speed: 18.5 knots (34.3 km/h; 21.3 mph)
- Complement: 777
- Armament: 4 × BL 12 in (305 mm) Mk IX guns; 4 × BL 9.2 in (234 mm) Mk X guns; 10 × BL 6 in (152 mm) Mk VII guns; 14 × 12-pounder 3 in (76 mm) guns; 14 × 3-pounder 47 mm (1.9 in) guns; 4 × 18-in (450-mm) torpedo tubes (submerged)
- Armour: Belt: 9 in (229 mm); Bulkheads: 8–12 in (203–305 mm); Barbettes: 12 in; Turrets: Main battery: 8–12 in; 9.2-inch battery: 5–9 in (127–229 mm); Casemates: 7 in (178 mm); Conning tower: 12 in; Decks: 1–2.5 in (25–64 mm)

HMS Africa was a pre-dreadnought battleship of the Royal Navy, and the penultimate ship of the King Edward VII class. The ship was built by Chatham Dockyard between 1904 and 1906. Armed with a battery of four 12-inch (305 mm) and four 9.2 in (234 mm) guns, she and her sister ships marked a significant advance in offensive power compared to earlier British battleship designs that did not carry the 9.2 in guns. Like all ships of the class (apart from HMS King Edward VII), she was named after an important part of the British Empire, namely Africa.

After commissioning in July 1905, she served briefly with the Atlantic Fleet from October to March 1907 before transferring to the Channel Fleet. She then joined the Home Fleet in 1909. Africa participated in tests with shipboard aircraft in January 1912, and she was the first British ship to launch an aeroplane. In mid-1912, she, along with her sister ships, was assigned to the 3rd Battle Squadron, part of the Home Fleet. That year, the squadron went to the Mediterranean Sea during the First Balkan War as part of an international blockade of Montenegro. In 1913, the ship returned to British waters.

When the First World War broke out, Africa was transferred back to the 3rd Battle Squadron, which was assigned to the Grand Fleet, the main British fleet during the war. Through 1914 and 1915, the ships frequently went to sea to search for German vessels, but Africa saw no action during this period. By the end of the year, the Grand Fleet stopped operating with the older 3rd Battle Squadron ships, and in April 1916 the 3rd Squadron was relocated to the Nore Command. Later that year, Africa was attached to the 2nd Detached Squadron, then serving in the Adriatic Sea. In 1917, she was sent to the 9th Cruiser Squadron, based in Sierra Leone; while she was there, her crew was stricken with Spanish flu. Africa returned to Britain in October 1918, was decommissioned the following month, and sold for scrap in 1920.

== Design ==
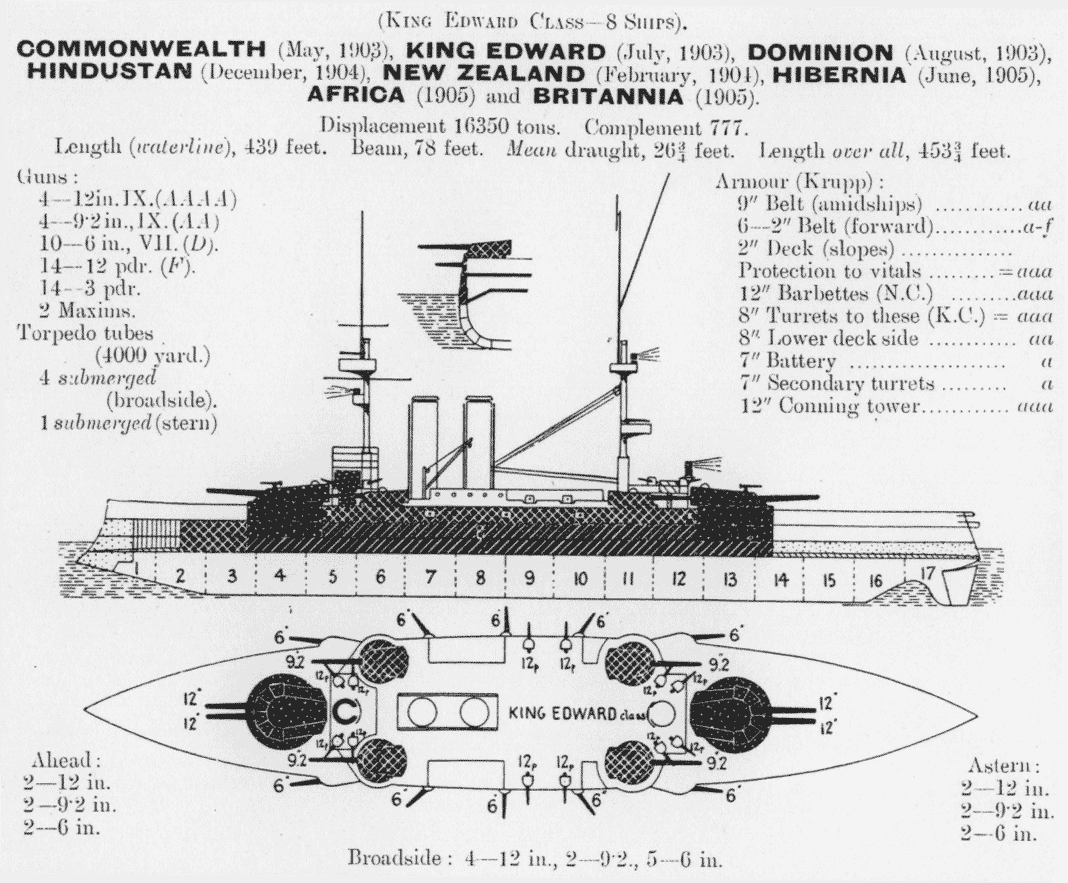
Left elevation and deck plan as depicted in Jane's Fighting Ships

Following the development of pre-dreadnought type battleships carrying heavy secondary guns of 8-inch (203 mm) diameter in the Italian Regia Marina and the United States Navy, the Royal Navy decided to build similar ships. Initial proposals called for a battleship equipped with eight 7.5 in (190 mm) guns to support the main battery, though under the direction of William Henry White, the Director of Naval Construction, these were replaced with four 9.2 in (234 mm) guns. The new ships, though based on the general Majestic type that had formed the basis of the preceding four battleship designs, marked the first significant change in the series. Like all late pre-dreadnoughts that entered service in the mid-1900s, Africa was made almost instantaneously obsolescent by the commissioning of the all-big-gun HMS Dreadnought in December 1906, armed with a battery of ten heavy guns compared to the typical four of most pre-dreadnoughts.

Africa was 453 feet 9 inches (138.30 m) long overall, with a beam of 75 ft (23 m) and a draft of 25 ft 8 in (7.82 m). The King Edward VII-class battleships displaced 15,585 to 15,885 long tons (15,835 to 16,140 t) normally and up to 17,009 to 17,290 long tons (17,282 to 17,567 t) fully loaded. Her crew numbered 777 officers and ratings. The King Edward VII-class ships were powered by a pair of 4-cylinder triple-expansion engines that drove two screws, with steam provided by sixteen water-tube boilers. The boilers were trunked into two funnels located amidships. The King Edward VII-class ships had a top speed of 18.5 knots (34.3 km/h; 21.3 mph) from 18,000 indicated horsepower (13,000 kW). On her 8-hour full-power trials conducted on 3 June 1906, Africa reached a top speed of 18.95 knots (35.10 km/h; 21.81 mph) from an average of 18,671 ihp (13,923 kW).

Africa had a main battery of four 12-inch (305 mm) 40-calibre guns mounted in twin-gun turrets fore and aft. These were supported by a heavy secondary battery of four 9.2 in (234 mm) guns in four single turrets, two on each broadside. The ships also mounted ten 6-inch 50 calibre guns mounted in casemates, in addition to fourteen 12-pounder 3 in (76 mm) guns and fourteen 3-pounder 47 mm (1.9 in) guns for defence against torpedo boats. As was customary for battleships of the period, she was also equipped with five 18-inch (457 mm) torpedo tubes submerged in the hull; two were on each broadside, with the fifth in the stern.

Africa had an armoured belt that was 9 inches (229 mm) thick; the transverse bulkheads on the aft end of the belt was 8 to 12 in (203 to 305 mm) thick. The sides of her main battery turrets were also 8 to 12 in thick, atop 12 in barbettes, and the 9.2 turrets had 5 to 9 in (127 to 229 mm) sides. The casemate battery was protected with 7 in (178 mm) of armour plate. Her conning tower had 12-inch-thick sides. She was fitted with two armoured decks, 1 and 2.5 in (25 and 64 mm) thick, respectively.

== Operational history ==
=== Early career ===
HMS Africa was laid down at Chatham Dockyard on 27 January 1904, launched on 20 May 1905, the ship was supposed to be christened by the Marchioness of Salisbury, however, due to unforeseen illness, Lady Londonderry took her place. The construction of the ship was completed in November 1906. Named for the British Empire's colonies in Africa, she was the last battleship constructed at Chatham, later classes of battleships being too large for the yard. Africa commissioned on 6 November 1906 at Chatham Dockyard for service in the Atlantic Fleet. She transferred to the Channel Fleet on 4 March 1907 and collided with the merchant steamer SS Ormuz off Portland on 23 March 1907, suffering only slight damage. Africa transferred to the Nore Division, Home Fleet, in June 1908, and in April 1909 joined the Second Division, Home Fleet. During this service she commissioned at Chatham as flagship of Vice Admiral Sir William Henry May, commander of the Third and Fourth Divisions, Home Fleet, on 25 April 1911; the battleship King Edward VII relieved her of this duty on 24 July 1911. In November 1911, she was placed in reserve at the Nore.

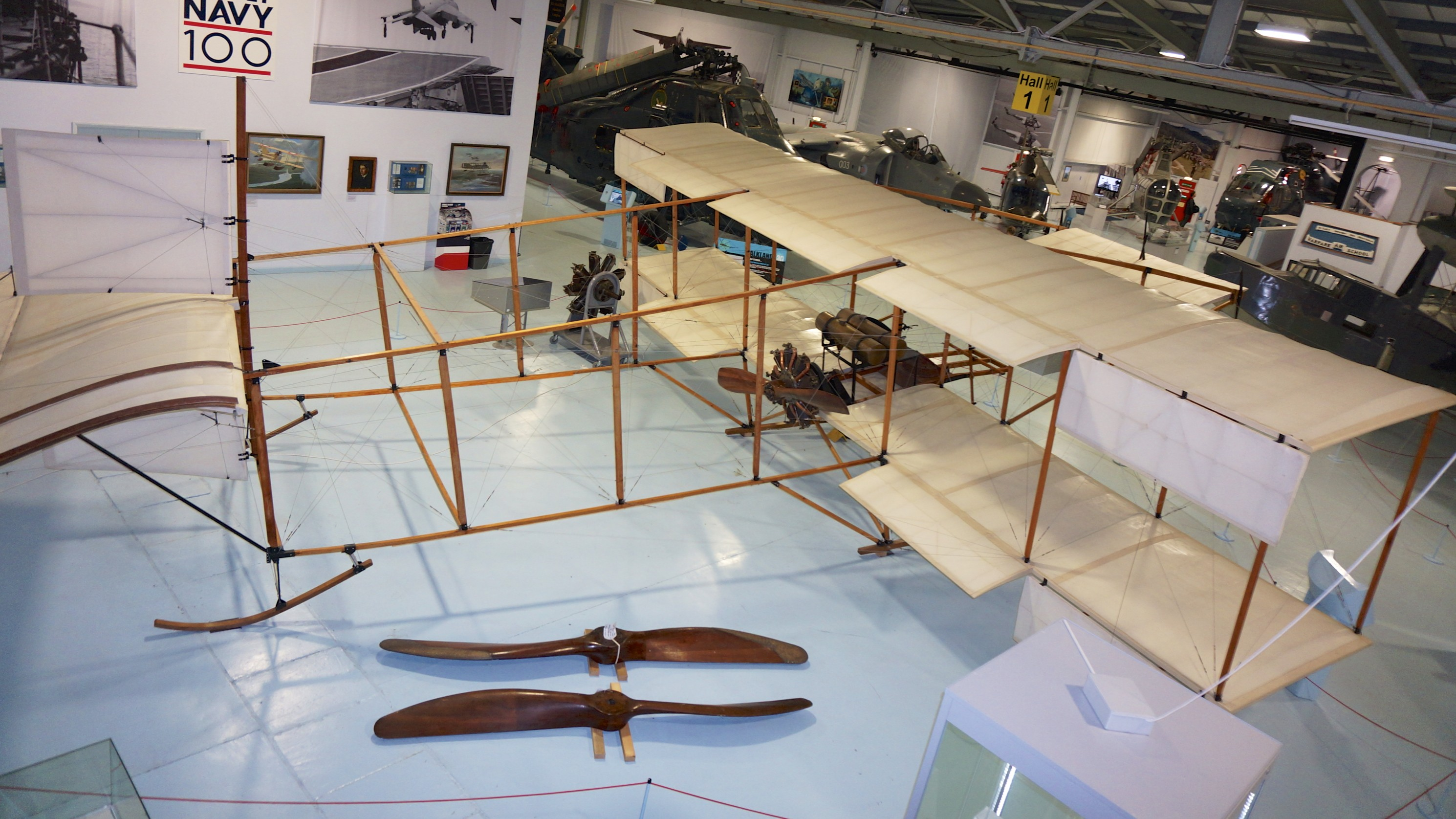
A Short Improved S.27 preserved at the Fleet Air Arm Museum

In January 1912, Africa took part in aircraft experiments at Sheerness. She was fitted for flying off aircraft with a 100-foot (30-metre) downward-sloping runway which was installed on her foredeck, running over her forward 12-inch (305-mm) turret from her forebridge to her bows and equipped with rails to guide the aircraft. Africa's crew tested the strength and stability of the rails by jumping up and down on them, then held the Gnome-engined Short Improved S.27 pusher seaplane in place as Lieutenant Charles Samson entered its cockpit to attempt the first British shipboard aircraft take-off on 10 January 1912 while the ship was at anchor in the River Medway. The aircraft moved quickly down the runway, dipped slightly after leaving it, but then pulled up and climbed easily. Samson circled Africa several times to the cheers of the crew, although on one pass he came uncomfortably close to the ship. After a few minutes, Samson climbed to 800 feet (240 metres) and concluded his historic flight by landing safely at an airfield ashore.

Africa transferred her flight equipment to her sister ship Hibernia in May. Based on the 1912 flight experiments on Africa, Hibernia, and battleship London, the Royal Navy concluded that shipboard aircraft were desirable for spotting and other fleet duties, but also that a fixed runway on a battleship interfered too much with the firing of the guns and that recovering seaplanes that had landed in a seaway was too difficult to be practical as a routine operation. But shipborne aviation had begun in the Royal Navy aboard Africa, and by 1917 would become an important part of British fleet operations.

Africa underwent a refit at Chatham in 1912. Under a fleet reorganization in May 1912, Africa returned to full commission and she and all seven of her sisters (Britannia, Commonwealth, Dominion, Hibernia, Hindustan, King Edward VII, and Zealandia) were assigned to form the 3rd Battle Squadron, assigned to the First Fleet, Home Fleet. The squadron was detached to the Mediterranean in November 1912 because of the First Balkan War (October 1912–May 1913); it arrived at Malta on 27 November 1912 and subsequently participated in a blockade by an international force of Montenegro and in an occupation of Scutari. Africa and Hindustan returned to the United Kingdom and the Home Fleet in February 1913 and were temporarily attached to the 4th Battle Squadron; They rejoined the 3rd Battle Squadron when it returned to the United Kingdom and rejoined the Home Fleet on 27 June 1913.

=== First World War ===
==== With the Grand Fleet ====
Map of the North Sea

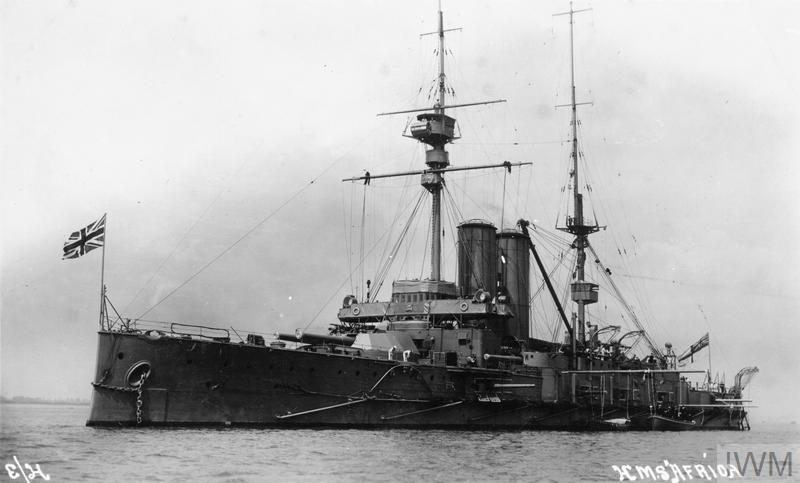
Battleship HMS Africa

Upon the outbreak of the First World War in August 1914, the 3rd Battle Squadron, at the time under the command of Vice Admiral Edward Bradford, was assigned to the Grand Fleet and based at Rosyth, where it was reinforced with the five Duncan-class battleships, It was used to supplement the Grand Fleet's cruisers on the Northern Patrol. On 6 August, the day after Britain declared war on Germany, elements of the Grand Fleet sortied to inspect the coast of Norway in search of a German naval base violating Norwegian neutrality. Africa and the rest of the 3rd Battle Squadron provided distant support to the operation. No such base was found, and the ships returned to port the next day. On 14 August, the ships of the Grand Fleet went to sea for battle practice before conducting a sweep into the North Sea later that day and into 15 August. During sweeps by the fleet, she and her sisters often steamed at the heads of divisions of the far more valuable dreadnoughts, where they could protect the dreadnoughts by watching for mines or by being the first to strike them. On 2 November 1914, the squadron was detached to reinforce the Channel Fleet and was rebased at Portland. It returned to the Grand Fleet on 13 November 1914.

On 14 December, the 1st Battlecruiser Squadron, 2nd Battle Squadron, and accompanying cruisers and destroyers left port to intercept the German forces preparing to raid Scarborough, Hartlepool and Whitby. On the first reports of contact with German units on the morning of 16 December, the Grand Fleet commander, Admiral John Jellicoe, ordered Bradford to take the 3rd Battle Squadron to support the ships in contact at 10:00. Four hours later, they met the 1st and 4th Battle Squadrons, en route from Scapa Flow, though they failed to reach the German High Seas Fleet before the latter withdrew. The Grand Fleet remained at sea until late on 17 December, at which point the 3rd Battle Squadron was ordered back to Rosyth. Africa and the rest of the squadron joined the Grand Fleet for another sweep into the North Sea on 25 December. The fleet returned to its ports two days later, having failed to locate any German vessels.

The 3rd Battle Squadron went to sea on 12 January 1915 for gunnery training, steaming north and passing to the west of Orkney on the night of 13–14 January. After completing training on the 14th, they returned to Rosyth on 15 January. On 23 January, the 1st and 2nd Battlecruiser Squadrons sortied to ambush the German I Scouting Group in what resulted in the Battle of Dogger Bank the following day. Later on the 23rd, the rest of the Grand Fleet, including Africa, sortied to support the battlecruisers. The 3rd Squadron ships left first and steamed at full speed to reach ships of the Harwich Force, which had reported contact with German vessels. The battlecruisers intervened first, and Africa and her sisters arrived around 14:00, by which time the battlecruisers had sunk the armoured cruiser Blücher and the surviving German ships had fled. The 3rd Battle Squadron patrolled the area with the rest of the Grand Fleet overnight before being detached at 08:00 on 25 January to steam to Rosyth.

Elements of the Grand Fleet went to sea repeatedly over the next few months. The 3rd Battle Squadron patrolled the central North Sea in company with the 3rd Cruiser Squadron from 10 to 13 March. The two units again went to sea to sweep the central North Sea from 5 to 8 April. A major fleet operation followed on 11 April, with the entire Grand Fleet sortieing for a sweep of the North Sea on 12 and 13 April. The squadrons returned to their ports on 14 April to replenish their fuel. Another such operation followed on 17 April, which also failed to find any German ships. The 3rd Battle Squadron returned to Rosyth late on 18 April. The fleet sortied again on 21 April, returning to port two days later. The 3rd Battle Squadron, joined by the 3rd Cruiser Squadron, patrolled the northern North Sea from 5 to 10 May, during which a German U-boat attacked the battleships but failed to score a hit.

Another sweep into the North Sea took place on 17–19 May, and no German forces were encountered. The fleet went to sea again on 29 May for a patrol south to the Dogger Bank before returning to port on 31 May, again without having located any German vessels. The Grand Fleet spent much of June in port conducting training, but the most modern units went to sea on 11 June for gunnery practice to the northwest of Shetland. While they were training, Africa and the rest of the 3rd Battle Squadron, along with the 3rd Cruiser Squadron, patrolled the central North Sea. Fleet activities were limited in July, owing to a threatened strike by coal miners, which began on 18 July and threatened the supply of coal for the fleet's ships. The strike continued into August, which led Jellicoe to continue to limit fleet activities to preserve his stocks of coal. The fleet saw little activity in September, and during this period, the Grand Fleet began to go to sea without the older ships of the 3rd Battle Squadron. In December, Africa went to Belfast for a refit that lasted until January 1916. On her way back to Scapa Flow, she passed unharmed through an area off Cape Wrath that had been mined by the German auxiliary cruiser SMS Möwe; her sister King Edward VII was not so lucky, striking one of the mines a few hours later and sinking.

==== Later operations ====
On 29 April 1916, the 3rd Battle Squadron was rebased at Sheerness (where Africa arrived on 2 May 1916), and on 3 May 1916 the squadron was separated from the Grand Fleet, being transferred to the Nore Command. Africa remained there with the squadron until August 1916. Africa began a refit at Portsmouth Dockyard in August 1916. Upon its completion in September 1916, she left the 3rd Battle Squadron and transferred to the Adriatic Sea, where a British squadron had reinforced the Italian Navy against the Austro-Hungarian Navy since Italy's entry into the war in 1915. Admiral Paolo Thaon di Revel, the Italian naval chief of staff, believed that the threat from Austro-Hungarian submarines and naval mines in the narrow waters of the Adriatic was too serious for him to use the fleet for active operations. Instead, Revel decided to implement a blockade at the relatively safer southern end of the Adriatic with the main fleet, while smaller vessels, such as the MAS boats, conducted raids on Austro-Hungarian ships and installations. As a result, she saw little activity while stationed there. She left the Adriatic in January 1917 for a refit at Gibraltar, during which the 6-inch guns on her main deck were replaced with four 6-inch guns a deck higher because the original guns were awash in even slightly rough weather.

When her refit was completed in March 1917, Africa was attached to the 9th Cruiser Squadron for service in the Atlantic Patrol and for convoy escort duties. She was based mainly at Sierra Leone and escorted convoys between Sierra Leone and Cape Town, South Africa. She underwent a refit at Rio de Janeiro, Brazil, from December 1917 to January 1918. In September 1918, while Africa was based at Sierra Leone, some of her crew became ill during the influenza pandemic that broke out that year. Their numbers virtually doubled each day from less than a handful at the start of the month until 9 September, when 476 crew members were reported ill. On that day, one crewman was reported dead of pneumonia following a case of influenza. Five more crewmen died on 12 September. The next day, another eight perished. On 14 September, ten more crewmen died. Africa sent burial parties ashore daily, and the ship was put into quarantine. By the time Africa hauled down her quarantine flag on 30 September 1918, 52 crew members had died of illness out of a total complement of less than 800.

In October 1918, Africa returned to the United Kingdom; she went into reserve at Portsmouth in November 1918. Following the First World War, Africa was briefly the depot ship of the 9th Cruiser Squadron and was employed as an accommodation ship. In December 1919 she was selected to replace the protected cruiser Diadem as stokers' training ship at Portsmouth, but this was cancelled. Africa was placed on the sale list in March 1920, and was sold for scrapping to Ellis & Company of Newcastle upon Tyne, England on 30 June 1920. She was scrapped at Newcastle.
