= HMS Britannia (1904) =

Pre-dreadnought battleship of the British Royal Navy

Coordinates: 35°53′N 5°53′W

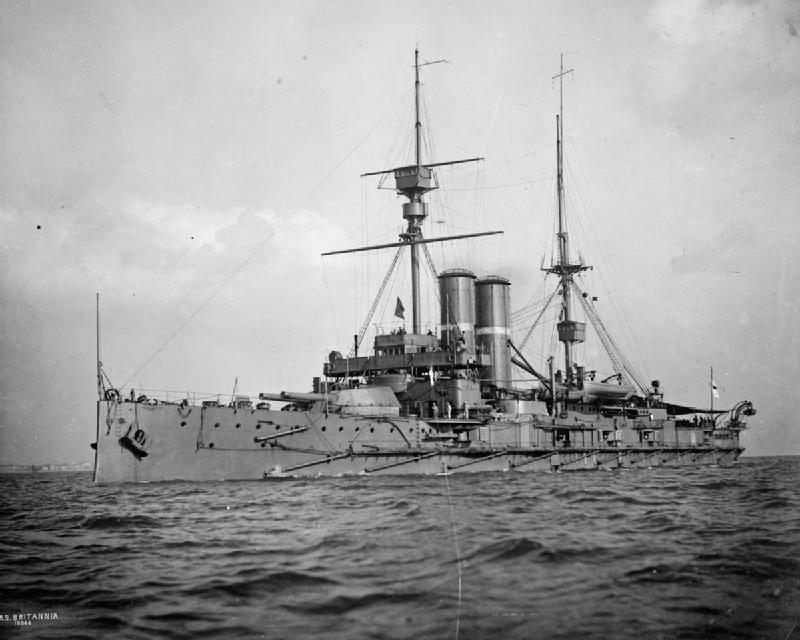
- HMS Britannia

History

United Kingdom
- Name: HMS Britannia
- Namesake: Britannia, the Roman name for the island of Great Britain and the name of a Roman province there
- Builder: Portsmouth Dockyard
- Laid down: 4 February 1904
- Launched: 10 December 1904
- Completed: September 1906
- Commissioned: 8 September 1906
- Fate: Sunk, 9 November 1918

General characteristics
- Class & type: King Edward VII-class pre-dreadnought battleship
- Displacement: Normal: 15,585 to 15,885 long tons (15,835 to 16,140 t); Full load: 17,009 to 17,290 long tons (17,282 to 17,567 t)
- Length: 453 ft 9 in (138.3 m) (loa)
- Beam: 75 ft (22.9 m)
- Draught: 25 ft 8 in (7.82 m)
- Installed power: 16 water-tube boilers; 18,000 ihp (13,420 kW)
- Propulsion: 2 × triple-expansion steam engines; 2 × screw propellers
- Speed: 18.5 knots (34.3 km/h; 21.3 mph)
- Complement: 777
- Armament: 4 × BL 12 in (305 mm) Mk IX guns; 4 × BL 9.2 in (234 mm) Mk X guns; 10 × BL 6 in (152 mm) Mk VII guns; 14 × 12-pounder 3 in (76 mm) guns; 14 × 3-pounder 47 mm (1.9 in) guns; 4 × 18-in (450-mm) torpedo tubes (submerged)
- Armour: Belt: 9 in (229 mm); Bulkheads: 8–12 in (203–305 mm); Barbettes: 12 in; Turrets: Main battery: 8–12 in; 9.2-inch battery: 5–9 in (127–229 mm); Casemates: 7 in (178 mm); Conning tower: 12 in; Decks: 1–2.5 in (25–64 mm)

HMS Britannia was a King Edward VII-class pre-dreadnought battleship of the Royal Navy. She was named after Britannia, the Latin name of Great Britain under Roman rule. The ship was built by Portsmouth Dockyard between 1904 and 1906. Armed with a battery of four 12-inch (305 mm) and four 9.2 in (234 mm) guns, she and her sister ships marked a significant advance in offensive power compared to earlier British battleship designs that did not carry the 9.2 in guns.

After commissioning in September 1906, she served briefly with the Atlantic Fleet from October to March 1907 before transferring to the Channel Fleet. She then joined the Home Fleet in 1909. In 1912, she, along with her sister ships, was assigned to the 3rd Battle Squadron, part of the Home Fleet. That year, the squadron went to the Mediterranean Sea during the First Balkan War as part of an international blockade of Montenegro. In 1913, the ship returned to British waters, where she was reassigned to the Second Division, Home Fleet.

When the First World War broke out, Britannia was transferred back to the 3rd Battle Squadron, which was assigned to the Grand Fleet, the main British fleet during the war. Through 1914 and 1915, the ships frequently went to sea to search for German vessels, but Britannia saw no action during this period. By the end of the year, the Grand Fleet stopped operating with the older 3rd Battle Squadron ships, and in 1916, she was attached to the 2nd Detached Squadron, then serving in the Adriatic Sea. After a refit in 1917, she conducted patrol and convoy escort duties in the Atlantic. On 9 November 1918, just two days before the end of the war, she was torpedoed by a German submarine off Cape Trafalgar and sank with the loss of 50 men. Britannia was one of the last British warships to be sunk in the war.

== Design ==
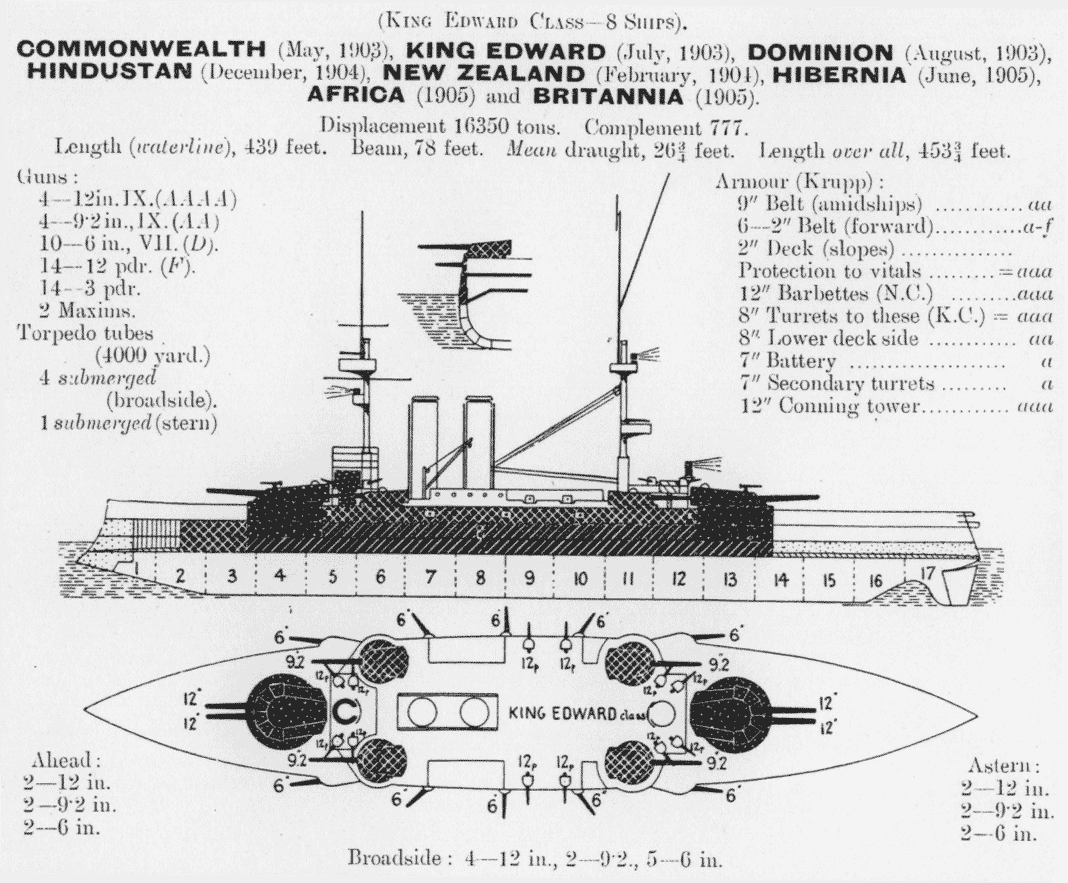
Left elevation and deck plan as depicted in Jane's Fighting Ships

Following the development of pre-dreadnought type battleships carrying heavy secondary guns of 8-inch (203 mm) diameter in the Italian Regia Marina and the United States Navy, the Royal Navy decided to build similar ships. Initial proposals called for a battleship equipped with eight 7.5 in (190 mm) guns to support the main battery, though under the direction of William Henry White, the Director of Naval Construction, these were replaced with four 9.2 in (234 mm) guns. The new ships, though based on the general Majestic type that had formed the basis of the preceding four battleship designs, marked the first significant change in the series. Like all late pre-dreadnoughts that entered service in the mid-1900s, Britannia was made almost instantaneously obsolescent by the commissioning of the all-big-gun HMS Dreadnought in December 1906, armed with a battery of ten heavy guns compared to the typical four of most pre-dreadnoughts.

Britannia was 453 feet 9 inches (138.30 m) long overall, with a beam of 75 ft (23 m) and a draft of 25 ft 8 in (8 m). The King Edward VII-class battleships displaced 15,585 to 15,885 long tons (15,835 to 16,140 t) normally and up to 17,009 to 17,290 long tons (17,282 to 17,567 t) fully loaded. Her crew numbered 777 officers and ratings. The King Edward VII-class ships were powered by a pair of 4-cylinder triple-expansion engines that drove two screws, with steam provided by sixteen water-tube boilers. The boilers were trunked into two funnels located amidships. The King Edward VII-class ships had a top speed of 18.5 knots (34.3 km/h; 21.3 mph) from 18,000 indicated horsepower (13,000 kW).

Britannia had a main battery of four 12-inch (305 mm) 40-calibre guns mounted in twin-gun turrets fore and aft. These were supported by a heavy secondary battery of four 9.2 in (234 mm) guns in four single turrets, two on each broadside. The ships also mounted ten 6-inch 50 calibre guns mounted in casemates, in addition to fourteen 12-pounder 3 in (76 mm) guns and fourteen 3-pounder 47 mm (1.9 in) guns for defence against torpedo boats. As was customary for battleships of the period, she was also equipped with five 18-inch (457 mm) torpedo tubes submerged in the hull; two were on each broadside, with the fifth in the stern.

Britannia had an armoured belt that was 9 inches (229 mm) thick; the transverse bulkheads on the aft end of the belt was 8 to 12 in (203 to 305 mm) thick. The sides of her main battery turrets were also 8 to 12 in thick, atop 12 in barbettes, and the 9.2 turrets had 5 to 9 in (127 to 229 mm) sides. The casemate battery was protected with 7 in (178 mm) of armour plate. Her conning tower had 12-inch-thick sides. She was fitted with two armoured decks, 1 and 2.5 in (25 and 64 mm) thick, respectively.

== Service history ==
=== Early career ===
HMS Britannia was built at Portsmouth Dockyard, and was named for the Latin name for Great Britain under Roman rule. She was laid down on 4 February 1904, launched on 10 December that year, and completed in September 1906. Britannia was commissioned into the reserve at Portsmouth Dockyard on 6 September 1906. She went into full commission on 2 October 1906 for service in the Atlantic Fleet. She transferred to the Channel Fleet on 4 March 1907. As part of a fleet reorganisation on 24 March 1909, the Channel Fleet became the Second Division, Home Fleet, and Britannia became a Home Fleet unit in that division, becoming Flagship, Vice Admiral, Second Division, in April 1909. She underwent a refit at Portsmouth from 1909 to 1910. On 14 July 1910, she collided with the barque Loch Trool, suffering slight damage.

Under a fleet reorganisation in May 1912, Britannia and all seven of her sisters (Africa, Commonwealth, Dominion, Hibernia, Hindustan, King Edward VII, and Zealandia) were assigned to form the 3rd Battle Squadron, assigned to the First Fleet, Home Fleet. The squadron was detached to the Mediterranean in November because of the First Balkan War (October 1912 – May 1913); it arrived at Malta on 27 November and subsequently participated in a blockade by an international force of Montenegro and in an occupation of Scutari. The squadron returned to the United Kingdom in 1913 and rejoined the Home Fleet on 27 June, after which Britannia left the squadron to return to the Second Division, Home Fleet.

=== First World War ===
==== With the Grand Fleet ====
Map of the North Sea

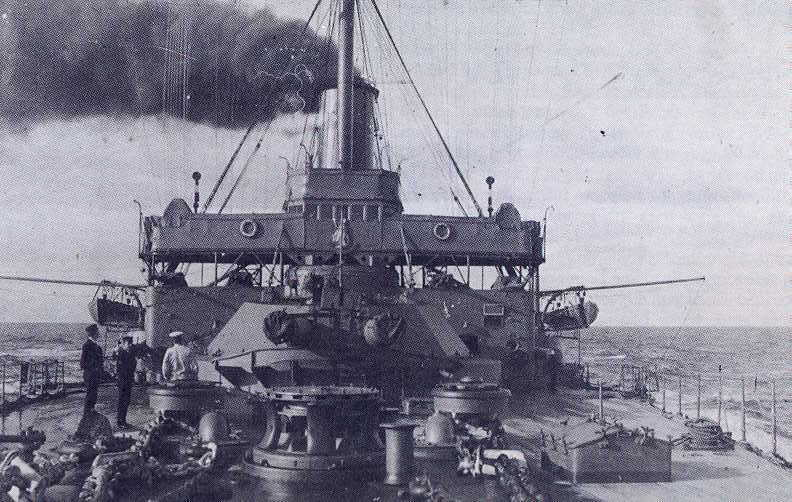
The forecastle of Britannia at sea in October 1914.

Upon the outbreak of the First World War in August 1914, the 3rd Battle Squadron, at the time under the command of Vice-Admiral Edward Bradford, was assigned to the Grand Fleet and based at Rosyth, where it was reinforced with the five Duncan-class battleships, It was used to supplement the Grand Fleet's cruisers on the Northern Patrol. On 6 August, the day after Britain declared war on Germany, elements of the Grand Fleet sortied to inspect the coast of Norway in search of a German naval base violating Norwegian neutrality. Britannia and the rest of the 3rd Battle Squadron provided distant support to the operation. No such base was found, and the ships returned to port the next day. On 14 August, the ships of the Grand Fleet went to sea for battle practice before conducting a sweep into the North Sea later that day and into 15 August. During sweeps by the fleet, she and her sisters often steamed at the heads of divisions of the far more valuable dreadnoughts, where they could protect the dreadnoughts by watching for mines or by being the first to strike them. On 2 November 1914, the squadron was detached to reinforce the Channel Fleet and was rebased at Portland. It returned to the Grand Fleet on 13 November 1914.

On 14 December, the 1st Battlecruiser Squadron, 2nd Battle Squadron, and accompanying cruisers and destroyers left port to intercept the German forces preparing to raid Scarborough, Hartlepool and Whitby. On the first reports of contact with German units on the morning of 16 December, the Grand Fleet commander, Admiral John Jellicoe, ordered Bradford to take the 3rd Battle Squadron to support the ships in contact at 10:00. Four hours later, they met the 1st and 4th Battle Squadrons, en route from Scapa Flow, though they failed to reach the German High Seas Fleet before the latter withdrew. The Grand Fleet remained at sea until late on 17 December, at which point the 3rd Battle Squadron was ordered back to Rosyth. Britannia and the rest of the squadron joined the Grand Fleet for another sweep into the North Sea on 25 December. The fleet returned to its ports two days later, having failed to locate any German vessels.

The 3rd Battle Squadron went to sea on 12 January 1915 for gunnery training, steaming north and passing to the west of Orkney on the night of 13–14 January. After completing training on the 14th, they returned to Rosyth on 15 January. On 23 January, the 1st and 2nd Battlecruiser Squadrons sortied to ambush the German I Scouting Group in what resulted in the Battle of Dogger Bank the following day. Later on the 23rd, the rest of the Grand Fleet, including Britannia, sortied to support the battlecruisers. The 3rd Squadron ships left first and steamed at full speed to reach ships of the Harwich Force, which had reported contact with German vessels. The battlecruisers intervened first, and Britannia and her sisters arrived around 14:00, by which time the battlecruisers had sunk the armoured cruiser Blücher and the surviving German ships had fled. The 3rd Battle Squadron patrolled the area with the rest of the Grand Fleet over the night before being detached at 08:00 on 25 January to steam to Rosyth. While steaming in the Firth of Forth off Inchkeith the next day, Britannia ran aground. She was stranded for 36 hours but was refloated; having suffered extensive damage, the ship required lengthy repairs at the Devonport Dockyard.

==== Later operations ====
On 29 April 1916, the 3rd Battle Squadron was rebased at Sheerness, and on 3 May it was separated from the Grand Fleet, being transferred to the Nore Command. Britannia remained there with the squadron until August, when she began a refit at Portsmouth Dockyard. On completion of her refit in September, Britannia transferred out of the 3rd Battle Squadron for service in the 2nd Detached Squadron, which had been organised in 1915 to reinforce the Italian Navy against the Austro-Hungarian Navy in the Adriatic Sea. Admiral Paolo Thaon di Revel, the Italian naval chief of staff, believed that the threat from Austro-Hungarian submarines and naval mines in the narrow waters of the Adriatic was too serious for him to use the fleet for active operations. Instead, Revel decided to implement a blockade at the relatively safer southern end of the Adriatic with the main fleet, while smaller vessels, such as the MAS boats, conducted raids on Austro-Hungarian ships and installations.

She underwent a refit at Gibraltar in February–March 1917, and on its completion was attached to the 9th Cruiser Squadron to serve on the Atlantic Patrol and on convoy escort duty, based mainly at Sierra Leone. She relieved the armoured cruiser HMS King Alfred as flagship of the 9th Cruiser Squadron in March and underwent a refit at Bermuda in May, during which her 6-inch guns were removed and replaced by four 6-inch guns in shielded pivot mounts on her shelter deck, in place of where the 12-pounder guns had been located.

==== Loss ====
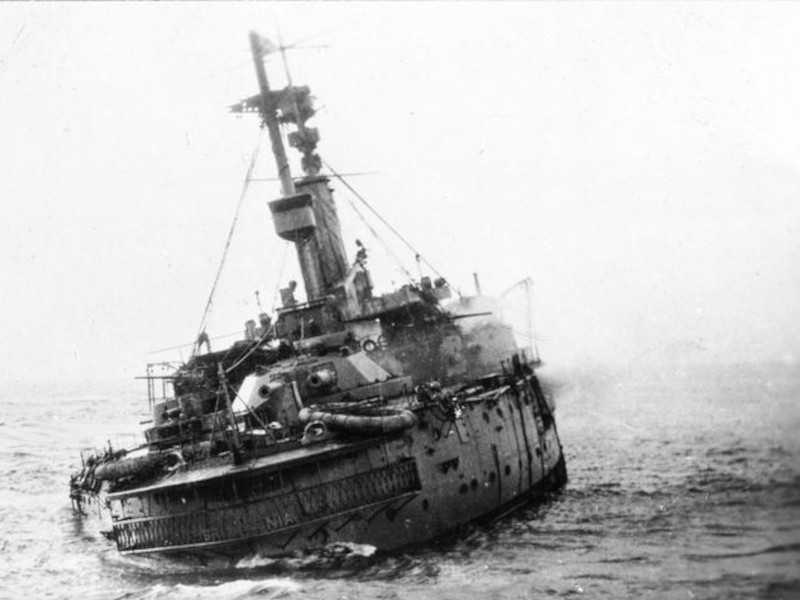
Britannia lists before sinking on 9 November 1918.

On the morning of 9 November 1918, under the command of Captain Francis Wade Caulfeild, Britannia was on a voyage in the western entrance to the Strait of Gibraltar when she was torpedoed off Cape Trafalgar by the German submarine UB-50. After the first explosion, the ship listed ten degrees to port. A few minutes later, a second explosion started a fire in a 9.2-inch magazine, which in turn caused a cordite explosion in the magazine. Darkness below decks made it virtually impossible to find the flooding valves for the magazines, and those the crew did find were poorly located and therefore hard to turn, and the resulting failure to properly flood the burning magazine probably doomed the ship. Britannia held her 10-degree list for 2 and a half hours before sinking, allowing most of the crew to be taken off. Most of the men who were lost were killed by toxic smoke from burning cordite; 50 men died and 80 were injured. In total, 39 officers and 673 men were saved.

Britannia was sunk only two days before the Armistice ending the First World War was signed on 11 November 1918. She was one of the last British warships lost in the war.
