= HMS Hibernia (1905) =

Pre-dreadnought battleship of the British Royal Navy

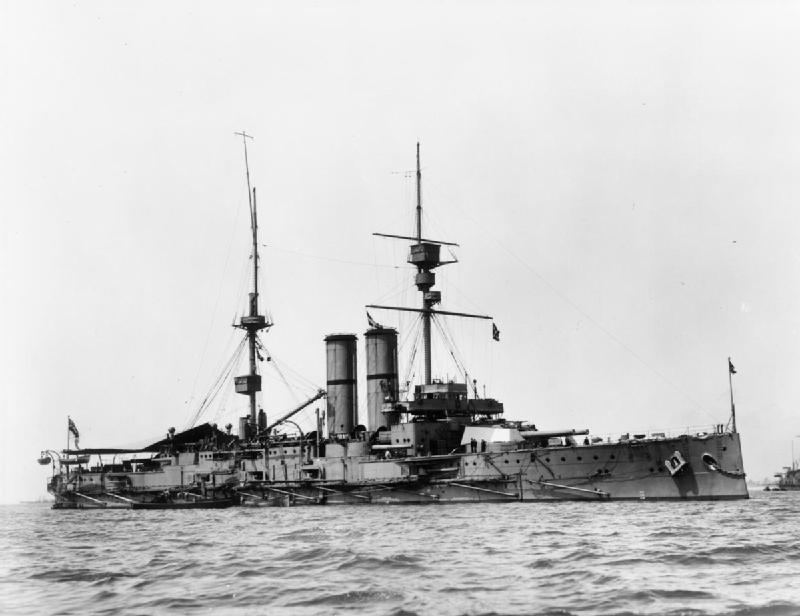
- HMS Hibernia c. 1914–1918

History

United Kingdom
- Name: HMS Hibernia
- Namesake: Hibernia, the Roman name for Ireland
- Builder: Devonport Dockyard
- Laid down: 6 January 1904
- Launched: 17 June 1905
- Completed: December 1906
- Commissioned: 2 January 1907
- Decommissioned: October 1917
- Fate: Sold for scrapping 8 November 1921

General characteristics
- Class & type: King Edward VII-class pre-dreadnought battleship
- Displacement: Normal: 15,585 to 15,885 long tons (15,835 to 16,140 t); Full load: 17,009 to 17,290 long tons (17,282 to 17,567 t)
- Length: 453 ft 9 in (138.3 m) (loa)
- Beam: 75 ft (22.9 m)
- Draught: 25 ft 8 in (7.82 m)
- Installed power: 16 water-tube boilers; 18,000 ihp (13,420 kW)
- Propulsion: 2 × triple-expansion steam engines; 2 × screw propellers
- Speed: 18.5 knots (34.3 km/h; 21.3 mph)
- Complement: 777
- Armament: 4 × BL 12 in (305 mm) Mk IX guns; 4 × BL 9.2 in (234 mm) Mk X guns; 10 × BL 6 in (152 mm) Mk VII guns; 14 × 12-pounder 3 in (76 mm) guns; 14 × 3-pounder 47 mm (1.9 in) guns; 4 × 18-in (450-mm) torpedo tubes (submerged)
- Armour: Belt: 9 in (229 mm); Bulkheads: 8–12 in (203–305 mm); Barbettes: 12 in; Turrets: Main battery: 8–12 in; 9.2-inch battery: 5–9 in (127–229 mm); Casemates: 7 in (178 mm); Conning tower: 12 in; Decks: 1–2.5 in (25–64 mm)

HMS Hibernia was a King Edward VII-class pre-dreadnought battleship of Britain's Royal Navy. Like all ships of the class (apart from HMS King Edward VII) she was named after an important part of the British Empire, namely Ireland. The ship was built by Devonport Dockyard; she was laid down in January 1904, was launched in June 1905, and was completed in December 1906. Armed with a battery of four 12-inch (305 mm) and four 9.2 in (234 mm) guns, she and her sister ships marked a significant advance in offensive power compared to earlier British battleship designs that did not carry the 9.2 in guns.

Commissioned in early 1907, Hibernia served as the flagship of the Rear Admirals of firstly the Atlantic Fleet and then the Channel Fleet. When the latter fleet was reorganised to the Home Fleet, she was based at the Nore. In 1912, Hibernia hosted trials in naval aviation with the temporary addition of a runway to her foredeck, and the first launch of an aircraft from a vessel underway was achieved from her in early May. Later in 1912, after her experiment with aviation was completed, she and her sister ships formed the 3rd Battle Squadron. That year, the squadron went to the Mediterranean Sea during the First Balkan War as part of an international blockade of Montenegro. In 1913, the ship returned to British waters.

The squadron was assigned to the Grand Fleet at the beginning of the First World War, and served on the Northern Patrol. Through 1914 and 1915, the ships frequently went to sea to search for German vessels, but Hibernia saw no action during this period. By the end of the year, the Grand Fleet stopped operating with the older 3rd Battle Squadron ships, and in December 1915, Hibernia was transferred to the Gallipoli Campaign and provided cover for the evacuation from the Gallipoli Peninsula. On returning to the United Kingdom she was again attached to the Grand Fleet before being transferred to Nore Command in May 1916, finishing the war as an accommodation ship. She was decommissioned in 1919 and scrapped in 1922.

== Design ==
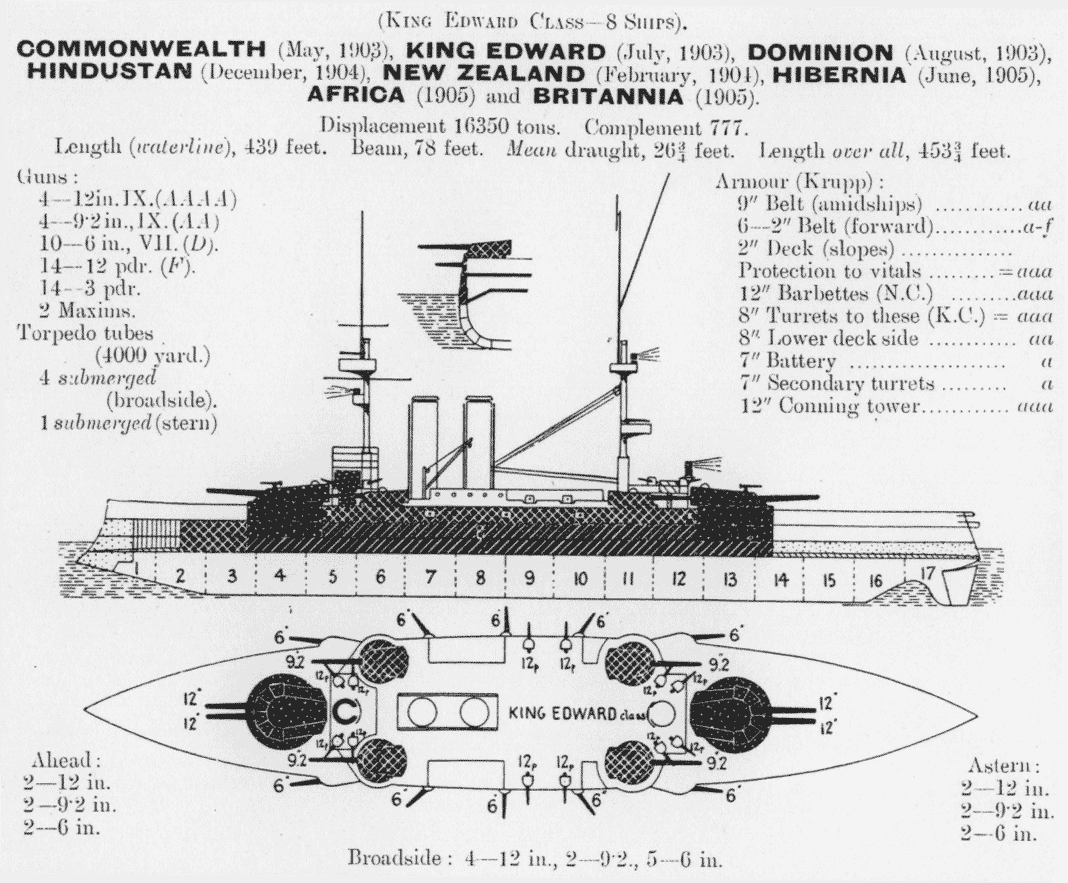
Left elevation and deck plan as depicted in Jane's Fighting Ships

Following the development of pre-dreadnought type battleships carrying heavy secondary guns of 8-inch (203 mm) diameter in the Italian Regia Marina and the United States Navy, the Royal Navy decided to build similar ships. Initial proposals called for a battleship equipped with eight 7.5 in (190 mm) guns to support the main battery, though under the direction of William Henry White, the Director of Naval Construction, these were replaced with four 9.2 in (234 mm) guns. The new ships, though based on the general Majestic type that had formed the basis of the preceding four battleship designs, marked the first significant change in the series. Like all late pre-dreadnoughts that entered service in the mid-1900s, Hibernia was made almost instantaneously obsolescent by the commissioning of the all-big-gun HMS Dreadnought in December 1906, armed with a battery of ten heavy guns compared to the typical four of most pre-dreadnoughts.

Hibernia was 453 feet 9 inches (138.30 m) long overall, with a beam of 75 ft (22.9 m) and a draft of 25 ft 8 in (7.82 m). The King Edward VII-class battleships displaced 15,585 to 15,885 long tons (15,835 to 16,140 t) normally and up to 17,009 to 17,290 long tons (17,282 to 17,567 t) fully loaded. Her crew numbered 777 officers and ratings. The King Edward VII-class ships were powered by a pair of 4-cylinder triple-expansion engines that drove two screws, with steam provided by sixteen water-tube boilers. The boilers were trunked into two funnels located amidships. The King Edward VII-class ships had a top speed of 18.5 knots (34.3 km/h; 21.3 mph) from 18,000 indicated horsepower (13,000 kW).

Hibernia had a main battery of four 12-inch (305 mm) 40-calibre guns mounted in twin-gun turrets fore and aft. These were supported by a heavy secondary battery of four 9.2 in (234 mm) guns in four single turrets, two on each broadside. The ships also mounted ten 6-inch 50 calibre guns mounted in casemates, in addition to fourteen 12-pounder 3 in (76 mm) guns and fourteen 3-pounder 47 mm (1.9 in) guns for defence against torpedo boats. As was customary for battleships of the period, she was also equipped with five 18-inch (457 mm) torpedo tubes submerged in the hull; two were on each broadside, with the fifth in the stern.

Hibernia had an armoured belt that was 9 inches (229 mm) thick; the transverse bulkheads on the aft end of the belt was 8 to 12 in (203 to 305 mm) thick. The sides of her main battery turrets were also 8 to 12 in thick, atop 12 in barbettes, and the 9.2 turrets had 5 to 9 in (127 to 229 mm) sides. The casemate battery was protected with 7 in (178 mm) of armour plate. Her conning tower had 12-inch-thick sides. She was fitted with two armoured decks, 1 and 2.5 in (25 and 64 mm) thick, respectively.

== Service history ==
=== Early career ===
HMS Hibernia was laid down at Devonport Dockyard on 6 January 1904, launched on 17 June 1905, and completed in December 1906. She was the last of the eight King Edward VII-class battleships to be completed. Hibernia was commissioned on 2 January 1907 at Devonport Dockyard for service as flagship of the Rear-Admiral, Atlantic Fleet. She transferred to the Channel Fleet for service as Flagship, Rear-Admiral on 27 February 1907. During this period, William Boyle, 12th Earl of Cork, served as her executive officer. In January 1909 she became Flagship, Vice-Admiral commanding. Under a fleet reorganisation on 24 March, the Channel Fleet became the 2nd Division, Home Fleet, and Hibernia became a Home Fleet unit in that division. On 14 July 1910 she was rammed by the barque Loch Trool just after the latter had collided with the battleship Britannia, but Hibernia suffered no noteworthy damage. In January 1912, she was relieved in the Second Division by battleship Orion and was reduced to a nucleus crew in the Third Division at the Nore.

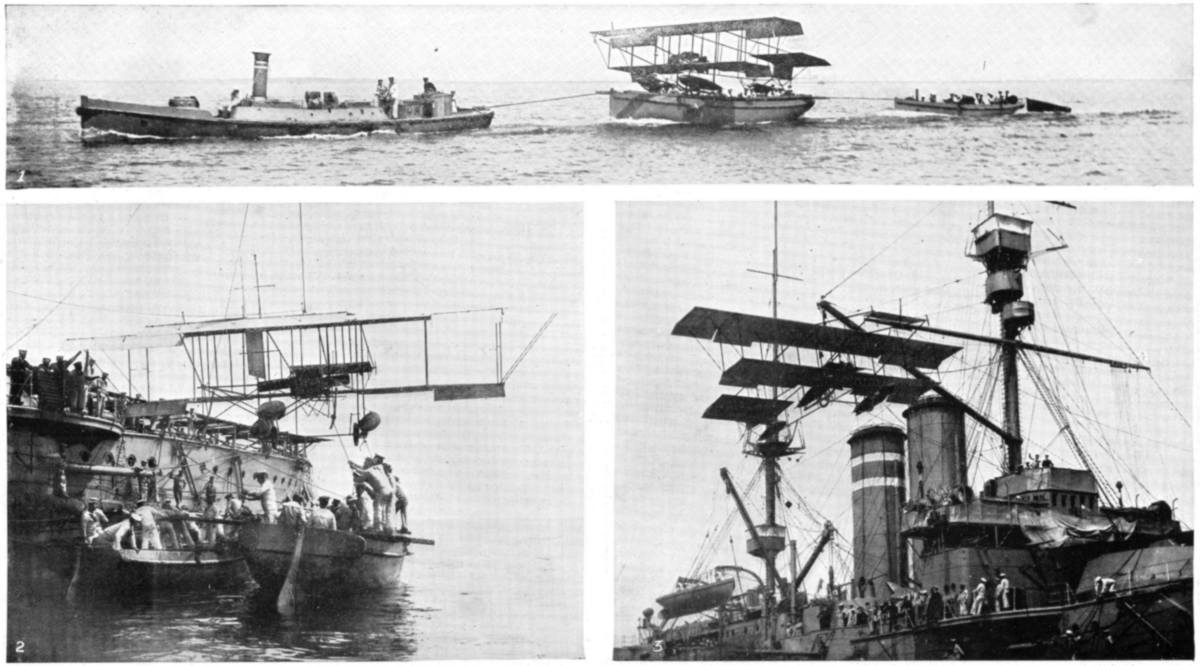
Collage depicting Commander Charles Samson's Short Improved S.27 aircraft being towed to and then hoisted aboard Hibernia

In January 1912, aviation experiments began at Sheerness aboard the battleship Africa, during which the first British launch of an aeroplane – the Short Improved S.27 biplane "S.38" (or "RNAS No. 2") flown by Commander Charles Samson – from a ship took place. Africa transferred her flying-off equipment, including a runway constructed over her foredeck above her forward 12-inch turret and stretching from her bridge to her bows, to Hibernia in May, and Hibernia hosted further experiments. Among these was the first launch of an aeroplane from a warship underway; Commander Samson, again flying "S.38," became the first man to do so. Sources differ on whether the date of the flight was 2 May, 4 May, or 9 May.

Samson took off from Hibernia while the ship steamed at 10.5 knots (19.4 km/h; 12.1 mph) at the Royal Fleet Review in Weymouth Bay, England. During the fleet review, King George V witnessed a number of flights at Portland over a period of four days. Hibernia then transferred her aviation equipment to battleship London. Based on the experiments, the Royal Navy concluded that aircraft were useful aboard ship for spotting and other purposes, but that interference with the firing of guns caused by the runway built over the foredeck and the danger and impracticality of recovering seaplanes that alighted in the water in anything but calm weather more than offset the desirability of having aeroplanes aboard. However, shipboard naval aviation had begun in the Royal Navy, and would become a major part of fleet operations by 1917.

Under a fleet reorganisation in May, Hibernia and all seven of her sisters (Africa, Britannia, Commonwealth, Dominion, Hindustan, King Edward VII, and Zealandia) were assigned to form the 3rd Battle Squadron, which was part of the First Fleet, Home Fleet. Hibernia returned to full commission on 14 May for service as Second Flagship, Rear-Admiral, of the squadron. The squadron was detached to the Mediterranean in November because of the First Balkan War (October 1912 – May 1913); it arrived at Malta on 27 November and subsequently participated in a blockade by an international force of Montenegro and in an occupation of Scutari. The squadron returned to the United Kingdom in 1913 and rejoined the Home Fleet on 27 June.

=== First World War ===
==== With the Grand Fleet ====
Map of the North Sea

Upon the outbreak of the First World War in August 1914, the 3rd Battle Squadron, at the time under the command of Vice Admiral Edward Bradford, was assigned to the Grand Fleet and based at Rosyth, where it was reinforced with the five Duncan-class battleships, It was used to supplement the Grand Fleet's cruisers on the Northern Patrol, and Hibernia continued her service as Second Flagship of the squadron. On 6 August, the day after Britain declared war on Germany, elements of the Grand Fleet sortied to inspect the coast of Norway in search of a German naval base violating Norwegian neutrality. Hibernia and the rest of the 3rd Battle Squadron provided distant support to the operation. No such base was found, and the ships returned to port the next day. On 14 August, the ships of the Grand Fleet went to sea for battle practice before conducting a sweep into the North Sea later that day and into 15 August. During sweeps by the fleet, she and her sisters often steamed at the heads of divisions of the far more valuable dreadnoughts, where they could protect the dreadnoughts by watching for mines or by being the first to strike them. On 2 November 1914, the squadron was detached to reinforce the Channel Fleet and was rebased at Portland. It returned to the Grand Fleet on 13 November 1914.

On 14 December, the 1st Battlecruiser Squadron, 2nd Battle Squadron, and accompanying cruisers and destroyers left port to intercept the German forces preparing to raid Scarborough, Hartlepool and Whitby. On the first reports of contact with German units on the morning of 16 December, the Grand Fleet commander, Admiral John Jellicoe, ordered Bradford to take the 3rd Battle Squadron to support the ships in contact at 10:00. Four hours later, they met the 1st and 4th Battle Squadrons, en route from Scapa Flow, though they failed to reach the German High Seas Fleet before the latter withdrew. The Grand Fleet remained at sea until late on 17 December, at which point the 3rd Battle Squadron was ordered back to Rosyth. Hibernia and the rest of the squadron joined the Grand Fleet for another sweep into the North Sea on 25 December. The fleet returned to its ports two days later, having failed to locate any German vessels.

The 3rd Battle Squadron went to sea on 12 January 1915 for gunnery training, steaming north and passing to the west of Orkney on the night of 13–14 January. After completing training on the 14th, they returned to Rosyth on 15 January. On 23 January, the 1st and 2nd Battlecruiser Squadrons sortied to ambush the German I Scouting Group in what resulted in the Battle of Dogger Bank the following day. Later on the 23rd, the rest of the Grand Fleet, including Hibernia, sortied to support the battlecruisers. The 3rd Squadron ships left first and steamed at full speed to reach ships of the Harwich Force, which had reported contact with German vessels. The battlecruisers intervened first, and Hibernia and her sisters arrived around 14:00, by which time the battlecruisers had sunk the armoured cruiser Blücher and the surviving German ships had fled. The 3rd Battle Squadron patrolled the area with the rest of the Grand Fleet over the night before being detached at 08:00 on 25 January to steam to Rosyth.

Elements of the Grand Fleet went to sea repeatedly over the next few months. The 3rd Battle Squadron patrolled the central North Sea in company with the 3rd Cruiser Squadron from 10 to 13 March. The two units again went to sea to sweep the central North Sea from 5 to 8 April. A major fleet operation followed on 11 April, with the entire Grand Fleet sortieing for a sweep of the North Sea on 12 and 13 April. The squadrons returned to their ports on 14 April to replenish their fuel. Another such operation followed on 17 April, which also failed to find any German ships. The 3rd Battle Squadron returned to Rosyth late on 18 April. The fleet sortied again on 21 April, returning to port two days later. The 3rd Battle Squadron, joined by the 3rd Cruiser Squadron, patrolled the northern North Sea from 5 to 10 May, during which a German U-boat attacked the battleships but failed to score a hit.

Another sweep into the North Sea took place on 17–19 May, and no German forces were encountered. The fleet went to sea again on 29 May for a patrol south to the Dogger Bank before returning to port on 31 May, again without having located any German vessels. The Grand Fleet spent much of June in port conducting training, but the most modern units went to sea on 11 June for gunnery practice to the northwest of Shetland. While they were training, Hibernia and the rest of the 3rd Battle Squadron, along with the 3rd Cruiser Squadron, patrolled the central North Sea. Fleet activities were limited in July, owing to a threatened strike by coal miners, which began on 18 July and threatened the supply of coal for the fleet's ships. The strike continued into August, which led Jellicoe to continue to limit fleet activities to preserve his stocks of coal. The fleet saw little activity in September, and during this period, the Grand Fleet began to go to sea without the older ships of the 3rd Battle Squadron.

==== Later operations ====
In November 1915, a division of the 3rd Battle Squadron consisting of Hibernia (which served as flagship of the division commander, Rear-Admiral Sydney Fremantle) and the battleships Zealandia, Russell, and Albemarle was detached for service in the Dardanelles Campaign. The ships departed Scapa Flow on 6 November 1915; Albemarle suffered heavy damage in a storm on the first night of the voyage and had to return for repairs, assisted by Hibernia and accompanied by Zealandia. Hibernia, Zealandia, and Russell then pressed on and arrived at the Dardanelles on 14 December 1915. Hibernia served as stand-by battleship at Kephalo and covered the evacuation of V and W Beaches at Cape Helles on 8 and 9 January 1916. Among those serving aboard her during this time was Augustus Agar, later V.C. and to become famous for exploits against the Bolsheviks and as captain of the heavy cruiser Dorsetshire in the Second World War. Later in January, Hibernia was stationed at Milo in case she was needed to cover an evacuation of the French force at Salonika.

Before the end of January, Russell relieved her as divisional flagship, and Hibernia returned to the United Kingdom, being reassigned to the Grand Fleet upon arrival at Devonport Dockyard on 5 February 1916. She underwent a refit there in February and March 1916 before rejoining the Grand Fleet. On 29 April 1916, the 3rd Battle Squadron was rebased at Sheerness, and on 3 May 1916 it was separated from the Grand Fleet, being transferred to the Nore Command. Hibernia remained there with the squadron until October 1917. In 1917 Hibernia's ten 6-inch guns were removed from their casemates because they were flooded in heavy seas and replaced with four 6-inch (152-mm) guns on the higher shelter deck. Six of the removed guns were transferred to the monitor Marshal Ney. In October 1917, Hibernia left the 3rd Battle Squadron and paid off into the Nore Reserve at Chatham Dockyard, where she served as an overflow accommodation ship.

In September 1918, the Commander-in-Chief, Grand Fleet, Admiral David Beatty, called for a large target to be provided which would allow the battleships of the Grand Fleet, which had seen little action since the Battle of Jutland in 1916, realistic gunnery practice. To meet this requirement, it was suggested that Hibernia be converted to radio control and undergo other modifications so that she could assume duty as a target ship, but ultimately the pre-dreadnought battleship HMS Agamemnon became available and was selected instead. In July 1919, Hibernia was placed on the disposal list at Chatham, and on 8 November 1921 she was sold for scrapping to Stanlee Shipbreaking Company of Dover. She was resold to Slough Trading Company in 1922, resold yet again to German scrappers, and towed to Germany to be broken up in November 1922.

== See also ==
- List of firsts in aviation
