= Henri Rollin =

French essayist

Henri Louis-Victor-Mars Rollin (9 November 1885 – April 1955) was a French naval officer, spy, journalist and essayist.

== Life ==
In 1903, he joined the French Navy and served on battleship Diderot in World War I. He subsequently served on Paris II and was taken prisoner by Mustafa Ertuğrul Aker on 13 December 1917, after the sinking of the ship.

In 1939, he published L'Apocalypse de notre temps and explored the world of intrigue that helped fabricate the forgery Protocols of the Elders of Zion, and how it became the source of Hitler's antisemitism. All but one copies of the book were destroyed by the Nazis, it remained unknown until its reedition in 1991.
