= Mustafa Ertuğrul Aker =

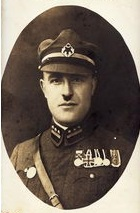
- Yüzbaşı Mustafa Ertuğrul (Aker) in 1927
- Born: 1892; Hanya, Crete, Ottoman Empire
- Died: 1961 (aged 68–69); Antalya, Turkey
- Military career
- Allegiance: Ottoman Empire, Turkey
- Branch: Turkish Army
- Service years: 1912 – 1946
- Rank: Artillery captain
- Conflicts: World War I Turkish War of Independence
- Awards: Medal of Independence, Iron Cross
- Other work: Wrote his memoirs of war

Mustafa Ertuğrul (1892–1961), Mustafa Ertuğrul Aker since the Surname Law of 1934 in Turkey, was a Turkish career officer. He was an officer of the Ottoman Army during World War I and of the Turkish Army in the early stages of the Turkish War of Independence (he was wounded near Aydın in 1919).

He accomplished a number of brilliant military feats, the most notable being the sinking of the British seaplane tender HMS Ben-my-Chree with shore artillery fire. In the same campaign along the coasts of southwestern Turkey, he also sank the French auxiliary aviso Paris II, the converted naval trawler Alexandra and a number of other Allied vessels in 1917.

== Life ==
He was born in 1893 in Hanya to Turkish Cretan parents. His family remained in Crete until 1903 when they moved to Istanbul where Ertuğrul attended the Ottoman Military Academy.

He married a daughter of his commander Şefik Pasha (Aker). After the 1934 Surname Law, he chose the family name of his father-in-law.

By the start of the Greco-Turkish War (1919-1922), he had been posted to Aydın region where he had the task of organizing and training Demirci Mehmet Efe's efe militia units. He was wounded in an ambush in 1919, and he spent the rest of his life in Antalya as a disabled officer. Mustafa Ertuğrul died in 1964.

== Ben Bir Türk Zabitiyim ==
Mustafa Ertuğrul's memoirs

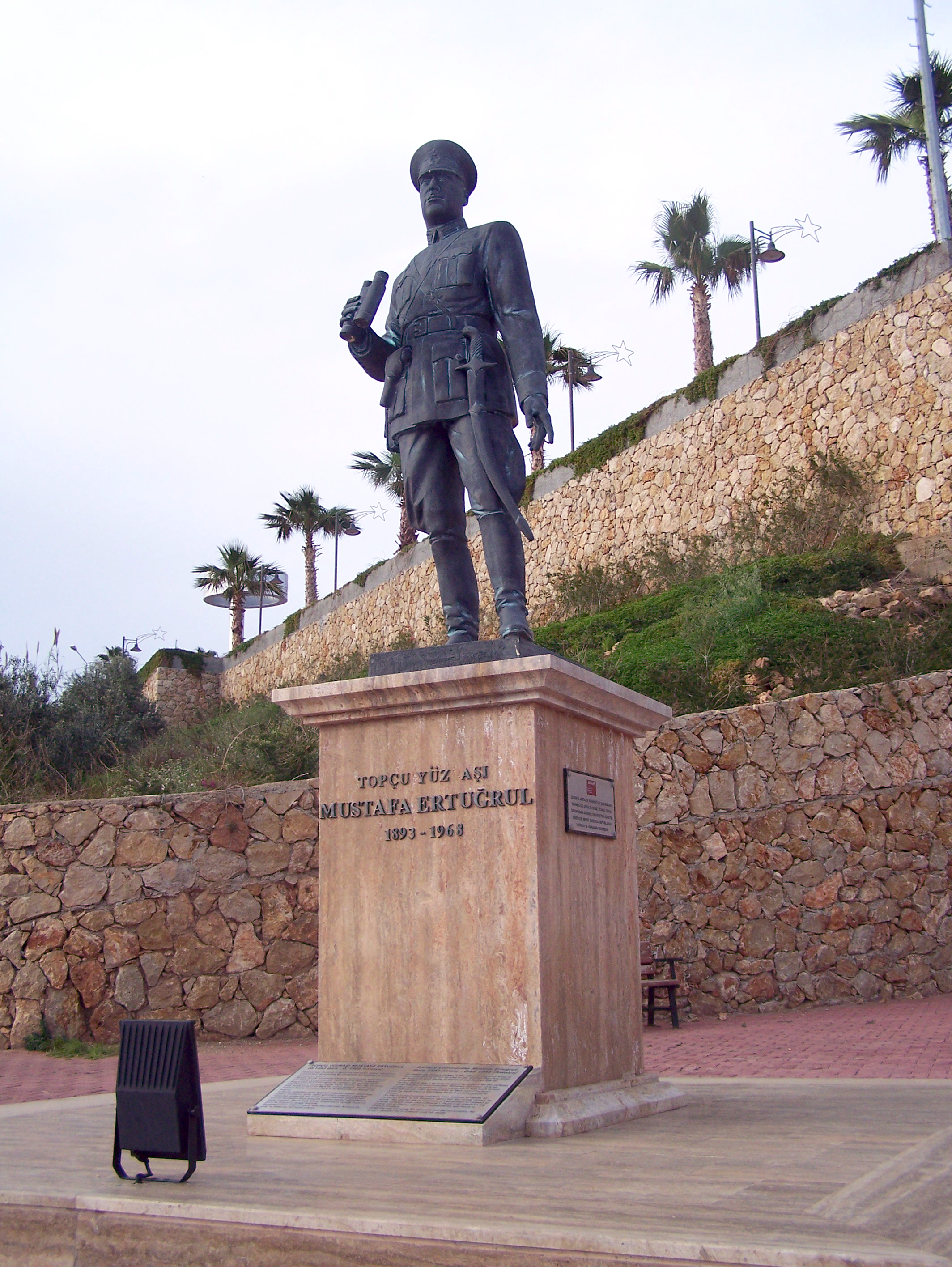
Statue of Mustafa Ertuğrul in Antalya, Turkey

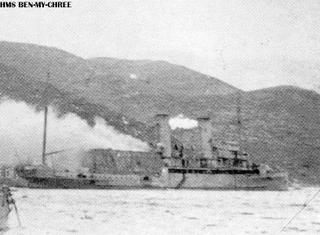
Ben-my-Chree on fire and sinking after having been hit by shore fire while in port in Kastelorizo

Ertuğrul was recently rediscovered in Turkey thanks to research done on him and on the shipwrecks off the coast in Ağva Bay near Kemer in Antalya Province by the skin diver and amphora collector Mustafa Aydemir.

A book, based on the account that he had typewritten himself in 1934, on Atatürk's personal encouragement, "Ben bir Türk zabitiyim" (I am a Turkish officer), was re-edited by Aydemir and supplemented with photographs and archive documents, notably from France. It was published for the first time in 2004, subsequently running into several editions. Prior to Ertuğrul's account having been made public, easily available information on the officer was restricted to a few lines in the memoirs of Liman von Sanders and Field Marshal Erich Ludendorff and documents and literature regarding Ben-my-Chree's sinking. The commander of Paris II, Henri Rollin was taken prisoner by Ertuğrul's unit after his ship's sinking and had also presented a detailed official report on Paris II and Alexandra at the end of the war in 1918.

Ertuğrul's story requires more in-depth research, with a number of points included in his account awaiting further clarification, notably his mention of another British naval vessel that he claimed to have sunk and believed to be the actual ship commanded by Charles Rumney Samson; HMS Dard.

== Decorations and awards ==
- Ottoman Order of Merit, 2nd class
- Subsidize the Navy Medal - given for services and assistance to the Ottoman Navy
- The badge of the pilot of the plane that was shot down by him in Çanakkale was given to Mustafa Ertuğrul as a souvenir.
- Austria 305 numbered commemorative badge mortars top union Canakkale
- Iron Cross (Germany)
- Medal of Independence (Turkey)
- Order of merit (Prussia)
- Cedit Girid Medal [Note 2]
- Battle of Galicia medal
- Military Medal for actions at Canakkale, Galicia, the Caucasus, Iraq and Egypt
