= Charles Rumney Samson =

British naval aviation pioneer (1883–1931)

Air Commodore Charles Rumney Samson CMG DSO & Bar AFC
- Samson from Army and Navy Illustrated, February 1915.
- Born: 8 July 1883; Crumpsall, Manchester
- Died: 5 February 1931 (aged 47); Salisbury, Wiltshire
- Military career
- Allegiance: United Kingdom
- Branch: Royal Navy (1897–1918); Royal Air Force (1918–1929)
- Service years: 1897–1929
- Rank: Air Commodore
- Commands: No. 6 Group (1924–26); RAF Mediterranean (1921–23); No. 4 Group (1918–19); RNAS Great Yarmouth (1917–18); HMS Ben-my-Chree (1916–17); No. 3 Wing RNAS (1915); No. 3 Squadron RNAS (1914–15); Naval Wing RFC (1912–14); Naval Air Station Eastchurch (1911–12)
- Conflicts: First World War
- Awards: Companion of the Order of St Michael and St George; Distinguished Service Order & Bar; Air Force Cross; Mentioned in Despatches (2); Knight of the Legion of Honour (France); Croix de guerre (France)

Air Commodore Charles Rumney Samson, CMG, DSO & Bar, AFC (8 July 1883 – 5 February 1931) was a British naval aviation pioneer. He was one of the first four officers selected for pilot training by the Royal Navy and was the first British pilot to fly an aircraft from a moving ship. He also commanded the first British armoured vehicles used in combat. Transferring to the Royal Air Force on its creation in 1918, Samson held command of several groups in the immediate post-war period and the 1920s.

== Early life ==
Samson was born in Crumpsall, Manchester, on 8 July 1883, the son of Charles Leopold Samson, a solicitor, and his wife Margaret Alice (née Rumney).

== Early naval career ==
Samson entered HMS Britannia as a cadet in 1896, before becoming a midshipman in the Royal Navy in 1898. In the 1901 Census he is listed as a midshipman aboard the battleship HMS Victorious. He was promoted Sub-Lieutenant in 1902 and the following year served on HMS Pomone in the Persian Gulf and Somaliland. He was promoted to lieutenant on 30 September 1904 while serving as an officer on boys' training ships.

In 1906 Samson was appointed Officer Commanding of Torpedo Boat No. 81 and in February 1908 he was posted to HMS Commonwealth. The following year he was appointed first lieutenant on HMS Philomel serving in the Persian Gulf and in the autumn of 1910 he transferred to HMS Foresight, again serving as the ship's First Lieutenant.

== Naval aviation ==
In 1911 he was selected as one of the first four Royal Navy officers to receive pilot training, and obtained his Royal Aero Club certificate on 25 April 1911, after only 71 minutes flying time, at a RAeC meeting that also awarded licences to the pioneer naval aviators Wilfred Parke and Arthur Longmore. He completed flying training at Eastchurch before being appointed Officer Commanding Naval Air Station Eastchurch in October 1911. In January 1912 he was promoted to acting Commander. The following April he was appointed Officer Commanding the Naval Flying School at Eastchurch.

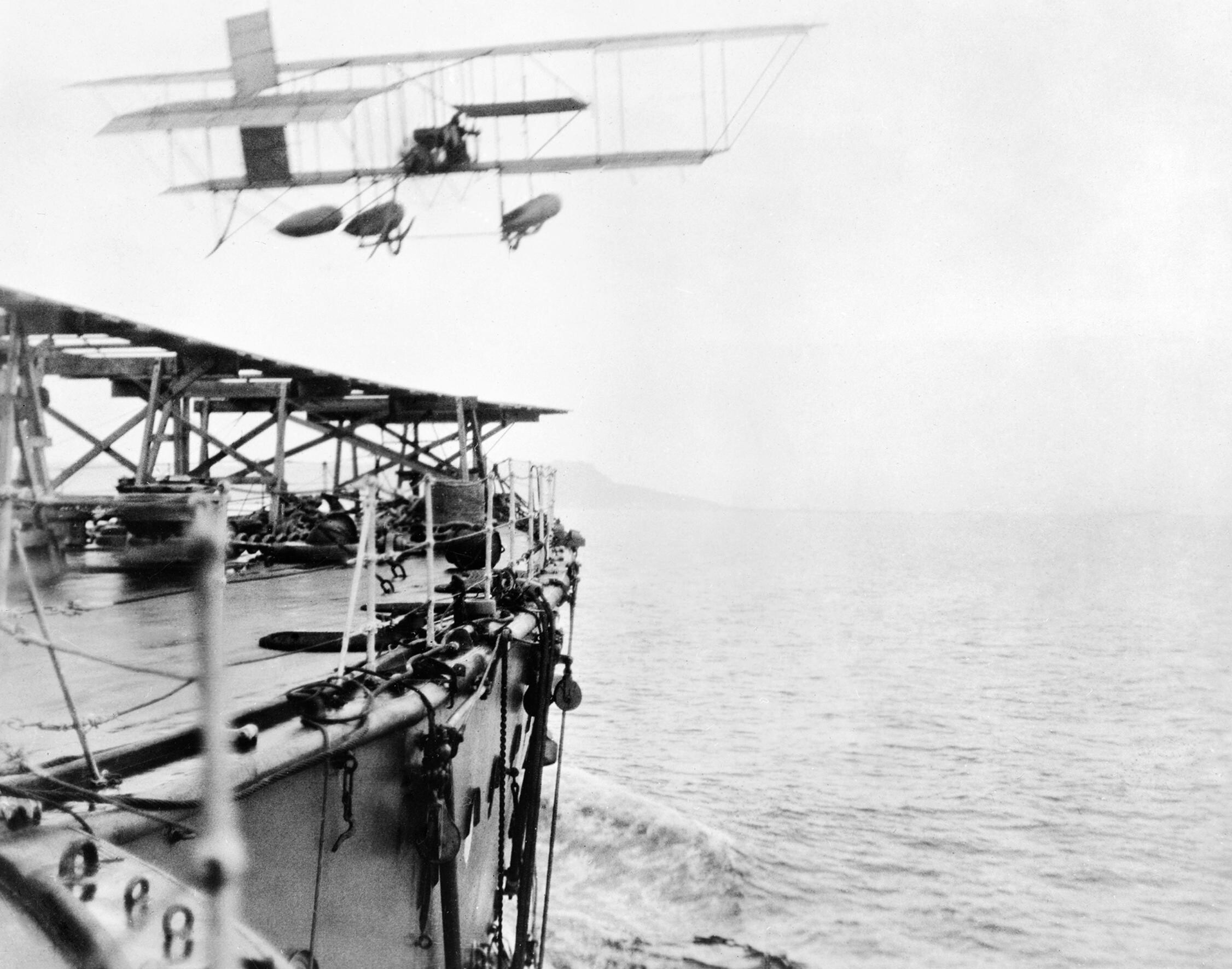
Samson's historic takeoff from HMS Hibernia, 9 May 1912.

Samson took part in several early naval aviation experiments, including the development of navigation lights and bomb sights. He was the first British pilot to take off from a ship, on 10 January 1912, flying a Short Improved S.27 from a ramp mounted on the foredeck of the battleship HMS Africa, which was at anchor in the river Medway. On 9 May 1912 he became the first pilot to take off from a moving ship, using the same ramp and aircraft, now fitted to the battleship HMS Hibernia during the 1912 Naval Review in Weymouth Bay. He repeated the feat on 4 July 1912, this time from the battleship HMS London while London was under way.

When the Royal Flying Corps was formed in May 1912 Samson took command of its Naval Wing, and led the development of aerial wireless communications, bomb and torpedo-dropping, navigational techniques, and night flying.

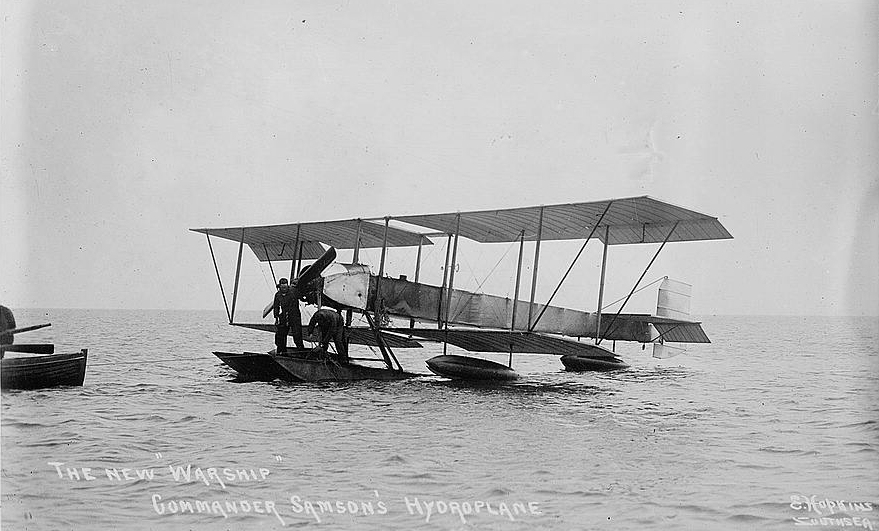
"The new "War Ship" Commander Samson's hydroplane", Short S.41 at Southsea, c.1913.

In 1914 the Royal Navy separated the Naval Wing from the Royal Flying Corps, naming it the Royal Naval Air Service (RNAS). In July Samson was appointed Officer Commanding the Eastchurch (Mobile) Squadron which was renamed No. 3 Squadron RNAS by September 1914.

In 1914, while Samson was in command of the Royal Naval Air Station at Eastchurch, he led a flight in the Naval Review at Spithead. In an effort to increase the popularity of flying in the navy, Samson had his pilots offer rides to anyone who was interested.

== First World War ==
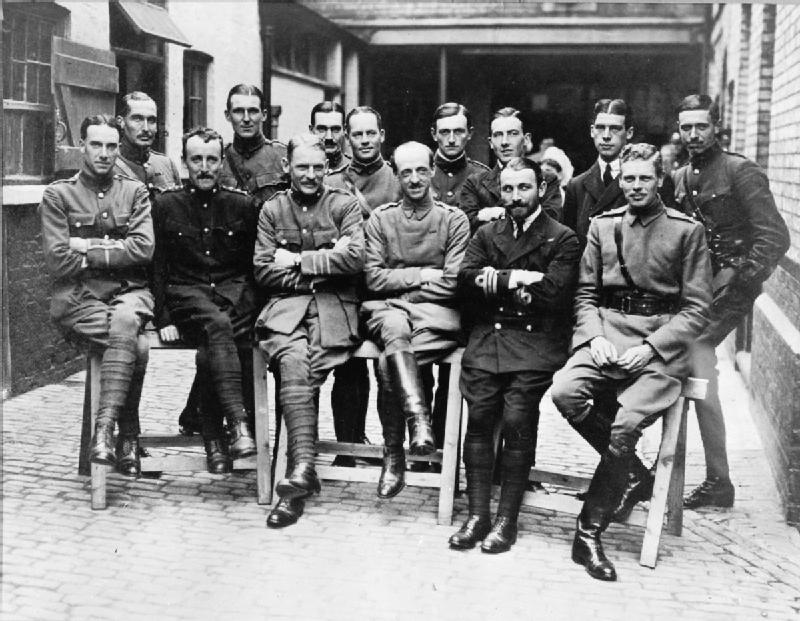
Samson with other pioneer officers of the Royal Flying Corps

When the First World War broke out, Samson took the Eastchurch RNAS Squadron to France, where it supported Allied ground forces along the French and Belgian frontiers. In the late summer of 1914, with too few aircraft at his disposal, Samson instead had his men patrol the French and Belgian countryside in the privately owned cars some of them had taken to war. The first patrol comprised two cars, nine men, and one machine gun. Inspired by the success of the Belgians' experience of armoured cars, Samson had two RNAS cars, a Mercedes and a Rolls-Royce, armoured. These vehicles had only partial protection, with a single machine gun firing backwards, and were the first British armoured vehicles to see action. Within a month most of Samson's cars had been armed and some armoured. These were joined by further cars which had been armoured in Britain with hardened steel plates at Royal Navy workshops. The force was also equipped with some trucks which had been armoured and equipped with loopholes so that the Royal Marines carried in them could fire their rifles in safety. This was the start of the RNAS Armoured Car Section.

Aggressive patrolling by Samson's improvised force in the area between Dunkirk and Antwerp did much to prevent German cavalry divisions from carrying out effective reconnaissance, and with the help of Belgian Post Office employees who used the intact telephone system to report German movements, he was able to probe deeply into German-occupied territory. Closer to Dunkirk, Samson's force assisted Allied units in contact with the Germans, and at other times made use of their mobility and machine guns to exploit open flanks, cover retreats, and race German forces to important areas.

Samson's aircraft also bombed the Zeppelin sheds at Düsseldorf and Cologne, and by the end of 1914, when mobile warfare on the Western Front ended and trench warfare took its place, his squadron had been awarded four Distinguished Service Orders, among them his own, and he was given a special promotion and the rank of commander. He spent the next few months bombing gun positions, submarine depots, and seaplane sheds on the Belgian coast.

In March 1915 Samson was sent to the Dardanelles with No 3 Squadron (later No 3 Wing); it was based on the island of Tenedos and, together with seaplanes from HMS Ark Royal, initially provided the only Allied air cover. On arrival, it was found that out of 30 aircraft that had been sent in crates, only 5 were serviceable (B.E.2s and a Nieuport 10). His squadron pioneered the use of radio in directing the fire of battleships and photo-reconnaissance. Samson flew many missions himself and on 25 April at the Landing at Cape Helles, he reported that "the sea was absolutely red with blood to 50 yards out" at Sed-el-Barr ("V Beach"). On 27 May, Samson attacked the German submarine U-21, which had just sunk HMS Majestic; when he ran out of bombs he resorted to firing his rifle at it. In June, a temporary airstrip was constructed at Cape Helles; Samson became well known for waving cheerily to the Allied troops in the trenches below. On one occasion, he bombed a Turkish staff car but only succeeded in breaking the windscreen; one of the occupants was Mustafa Kemal, the charismatic Turkish commander and later founder of the Turkish Republic. In August, Samson's wing was moved to a new airfield at Imbros where it was joined by No 2 Wing under the overall command of Colonel Frederick Sykes. who had been given the naval rank of Wing Captain with three years' seniority. Sykes had previously written a critical report of the Gallipoli air operations, which had caused Samson to lobby against Sykes; however, Samson loyally served under Sykes until he was recalled to London in November.

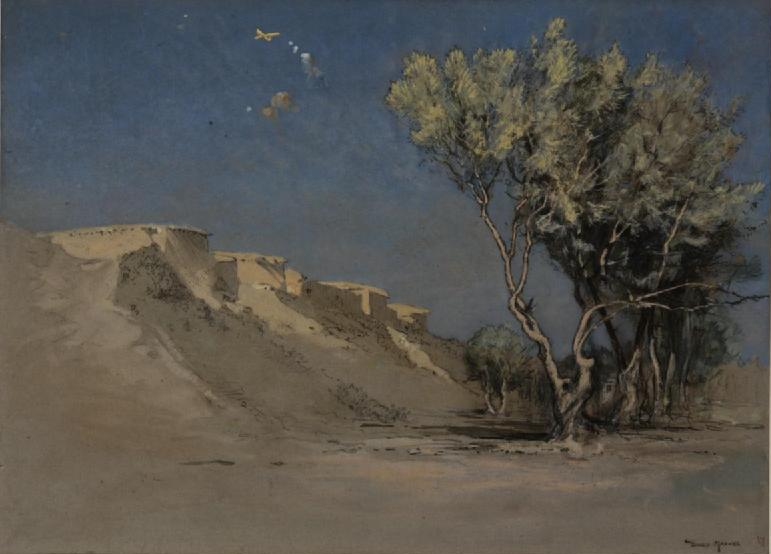
"Another Samson at the Gates of Gaza: A seaplane incident: Commander Samson, RNAS at Gaza", by Donald Maxwell

On 14 May 1916, Samson was given command of HMS Ben-my-Chree, a former Isle of Man passenger steamer which had been converted into a seaplane carrier. Based at Port Said, he patrolled the coasts of Palestine and Syria, sending his aircraft on reconnaissance missions and bombing Turkish positions, often flying himself on operations. On 2 June, Samson took his ship through the Suez Canal to Aden, where he personally led a six-day bombing campaign. After silencing Turkish guns at Perim, Ben My Chree headed to Jidda where on 15 June, her aircraft operated in support of an attack by Arab forces led by Faisal, son of Hussein bin Ali, Sharif of Mecca; Samson lost the heel of his boot as well as various pieces of his seaplane to ground fire. The Turks surrendered the next day. Further operations off the coast of Palestine followed; on 26 July, Samson and his observer, Lieutenant Wedgewood Benn destroyed a train carrying 1,600 troops with a 16 lb bomb. In almost continuous action through the rest of 1916, Samson received a signal from the Admiralty asking why Ben-my-Chree had used so much ammunition; he replied "that there was unfortunately a war on". In January 1917 he sailed to Castellorizo to carry out joint operations with the French, and in the harbour there the Ben My Chree was sunk on 11 January by Turkish gunfire. A subsequent Court-martial acquitted Samson and the crew of all responsibility and commended them for their behaviour. His two escort ships, already equipped to carry a few seaplanes, were fitted out for independent air operations, and from Aden and later Colombo, he patrolled the Indian Ocean for enemy commerce raiders.

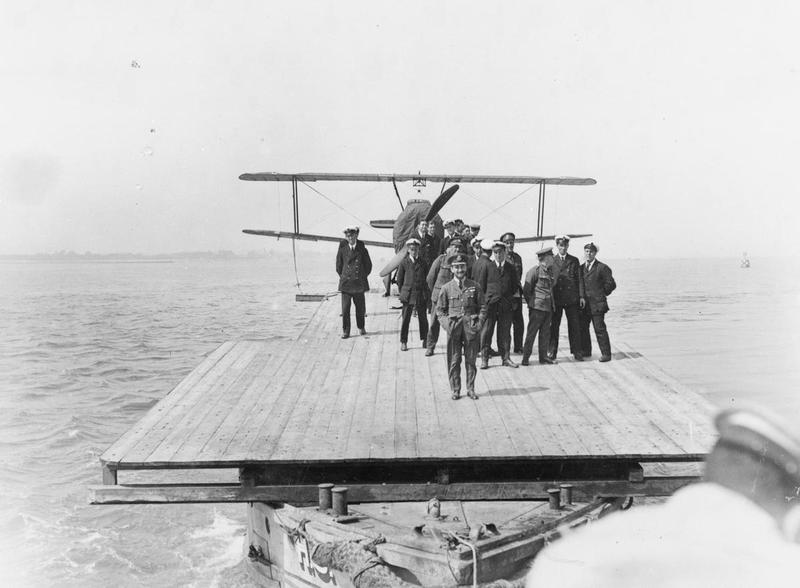
Samson in the foreground with lighter crew and Sopwith Camel 2.F1, 31 July 1918.

From November 1917 until the end of the War, Samson was in command of an aircraft group at Great Yarmouth responsible for anti-submarine and anti-Zeppelin operations over the North Sea, during which time his group shot down five Zeppelins. In order to bring fighter aircraft into action near the enemy coasts, he developed with John Cyril Porte an adapted seaplane lighter which could be towed behind naval vessels and used as a take-off platform by fighter aircraft. This system led to the destruction of Zeppelin L53 on 11 August 1918 by Lieutenant S. D. Culley, who was awarded the Military Cross. The Sopwith Camel flown by Culley in the attack can be seen at the Imperial War Museum.

In October 1918 the group became 73 Wing of the new No. 4 Group based at the Seaplane Experimental Station, Felixstowe as part of the Royal Air Force. Samson became commanding officer of this group, and in August 1919 gave up his naval commission and received instead a permanent commission in the RAF with the rank of Group Captain.

== Marriage ==
Samson was married in Colombo on 7 April 1917 to Miss Honor Oakden Patrickson Storey, the only daughter of Herbert Lushington Storey, and his wife, Emily Muriel Storey. They had one daughter.

Samson was granted a decree nisi against his wife by the Divorce Court in London in December 1923. Their divorce became final in 1924.

He was married again, in 1924, to Winifred Reeves, the daughter of Mr and Mrs Herbert K. Reeves, who survived him. They had two children, John Louis Rumney born 19 June 1925 and Priscilla Rumney born after her father's death on 24 March 1931.

== Postwar ==
During 1920 Samson served as Chief Staff Officer in the Coastal Area, and in 1921 became Air Officer Commanding for RAF units in the Mediterranean, based at Malta. In 1922 he was promoted to air commodore and given command of 6 Fighter Group at RAF Kenley (S London).

In June 1926 he became Chief Staff Officer of the RAF's Middle East Command, in September 1926 he led a flight from Cairo to Aden: the flight left Cairo on 15 September 1926 and was flown by two Vickers Victoria biplanes and returned to Cairo on 29 September. He later flew an RAF formation of four Fairey III biplanes from Cairo to the Cape of Good Hope. He remained with the Middle East command until August 1927.

Samson was placed on the retired list on account of ill health in 1929 and died of heart failure at his home near Salisbury, Wiltshire, on 5 February 1931. He was buried at Putney Vale Cemetery on 10 February.

== Honours and awards ==
- 21 October 1914 – Companion of the Distinguished Service Order in recognition for service between 1 September and 5 October 1914 in command of the Aeroplane and Armoured Motor Support of the Royal Naval Air Service at Dunkirk.
- 1914 – Croix de guerre (France)
- 1915 – Knight of the Legion of Honour (France)
- 14 March 1916 – Mention in Despatches for service in action during the landing and evacuation on the Gallipoli peninsula.
- 23 January 1917 – Bar to the Distinguished Service Order for continued gallantry as a Flying Officer.
- 1 January 1919 – Air Force Cross
- 3 June 1919 – Companion of the Order of St Michael and St George in recognition of distinguished service during the war.

== See also ==
- List of firsts in aviation
- Eugene Burton Ely, the first pilot to take off from a ship and land on a ship
- Mustafa Ertuğrul Aker, the first officer to sink an aircraft carrier
- Force Z#Origins.2C Destruction.2C Vindication, on Samson's unheeded warnings

== Bibliography ==
- Samson, Charles Rumney (1930). Fights and flights. E. Benn Limited.
- Samson, Charles Rumney (1931). A Flight from Cairo to Cape Town and Back. E. Benn Limited.
- Moorehead, Alan (1956). Gallipoli. Hamish Hamilton Ltd. ISBN 978-1-84513-239-2.
- Air of Authority – A History of RAF Organisation – Air Commodore C R Samson
- Oxford Dictionary of National Biography – Samson, Charles Rumney

Military offices
Preceded by Cecil Malone	Officer Commanding HMS Ben-my-Chree; As principal ship of the RNAS composite unit 1916–1917	None; Ship sunk by Turkish gunfire
New title Group established	Officer Commanding No. 4 Group; 1918–1919	Vacant Title next held by Arthur Harris; In 1937
Preceded by Eugene Gerrard	Officer Commanding Mediterranean Group; AOC Mediterranean Group from 1 January 1922; AOC RAF Mediterranean from 1 April 1922; 1921–1923	Succeeded by Arthur Bigsworth
New title Group established Possibly after brief existence in 1918	Air Officer Commanding No. 6 Group; 1924–1926	Vacant Title next held by John Quinnell; In 1936
