= Francis Mitchell =

Francis Mitchell may refer to:

- Francis Mitchell (knight) (c. 1556–c. 1628), English knight, last to be publicly degraded
- Francis Mitchell (Royal Navy officer) (1876–1946), British admiral
- Francis Mitchell (British Army officer) (1904–1954), British general
- Francis John Mitchell (1929–1970), Australian biologist and herpetologist

== See also ==
- Frank Mitchell (disambiguation)
