= Douglas Reynolds =

Recipient of the Victoria Cross

- Born: 20 September 1882; Clifton, Bristol, UK
- Died: 23 February 1916 (aged 33); Le Touquet, France
- Burial place: Étaples Military Cemetery
- Relatives: Sir John Hunter; Maj.-Gen. John William Reynolds; Lieut-Gen. Charles Reynolds; Adm. Francis Mitchell; Rev. Patrick Reynolds Mitchell KCVO; Maj.-Gen. Francis Mitchell; Lieut-Cmdr. David Reynolds Mitchell
- Military career
- Allegiance: United Kingdom
- Branch: British Army
- Service years: 1900-1916
- Rank: Major
- Units: Royal Field Artillery
- Conflicts: World War I
- Awards: Victoria Cross; Legion d’Honneur

Douglas Reynolds VC (20 September 1882 – 23 February 1916) was an English recipient of the Victoria Cross, the highest and most prestigious award for gallantry in the face of the enemy that can be awarded to British and Commonwealth forces.

== Biography ==
Reynolds depicted on a cigarette card

Reynolds' grave at Étaples Military Cemetery

The son of Lt.-Col. Henry Charles Reynolds and Sarah Eleanor B. Goodwyn, he was educated at Cheltenham College. He was 31 years old, and a captain in the 37th Bty., Royal Field Artillery, British Army during the First World War when the following deed took place for which he was awarded the VC.

On 26 August 1914 at Le Cateau, France, Captain Reynolds took up two teams with volunteer drivers, to recapture two British guns and limbered up two guns under heavy artillery and infantry fire. Although the enemy was within 100 yards he managed, with the help of two drivers (Job Henry Charles Drain and Frederick Luke), to get one gun away safely. On 9 September at Pysloup, he reconnoitered at close range, discovered a battery which was holding up the advance and silenced it.

A third volunteer, Ben Cobey, had joined Reynolds' group, and was killed in action during the retrieval of the guns. His name was omitted from the citation.

He was awarded the French Croix de Chevalier de Legion d'Honneur on 3 November 1914, and his Victoria Cross was presented to him by King George V at Buckingham Palace on 13 January 1915.

Reynolds later achieved the rank of major, but was wounded in action by a gas shell, and died in the Duchess of Westminster's hospital in Le Touquet, France, on 23 February 1916.

Major Reynolds is buried in Etaples Military Cemetery in Northern France, while his Victoria Cross is displayed at the Royal Artillery Museum in Woolwich, London.

== Freemasonry ==
He was Initiated into English Freemasonry in Kitchener Lodge, No. 2998, (New Delhi, India) on 12 June; Passed on 5 August and Raised on 2 December 1912.

== Bibliography ==
- Buzzell, Nora, ed. (1997). The Register of the Victoria Cross. Cheltenham, Gloucestershire: This England Alma House. ISBN 0-906324-27-0.
- Gliddon, Gerald (2011) [1994]. 1914. VCs of the First World War. Stroud, Gloucestershire: The History Press. ISBN 978-0752459080.
- Harvey, David (2000). Monuments to Courage. Naval & Military Press Ltd. ISBN 1-84342-356-1.
