= 2nd Battle Squadron =

Former battleship formation of the Royal Navy

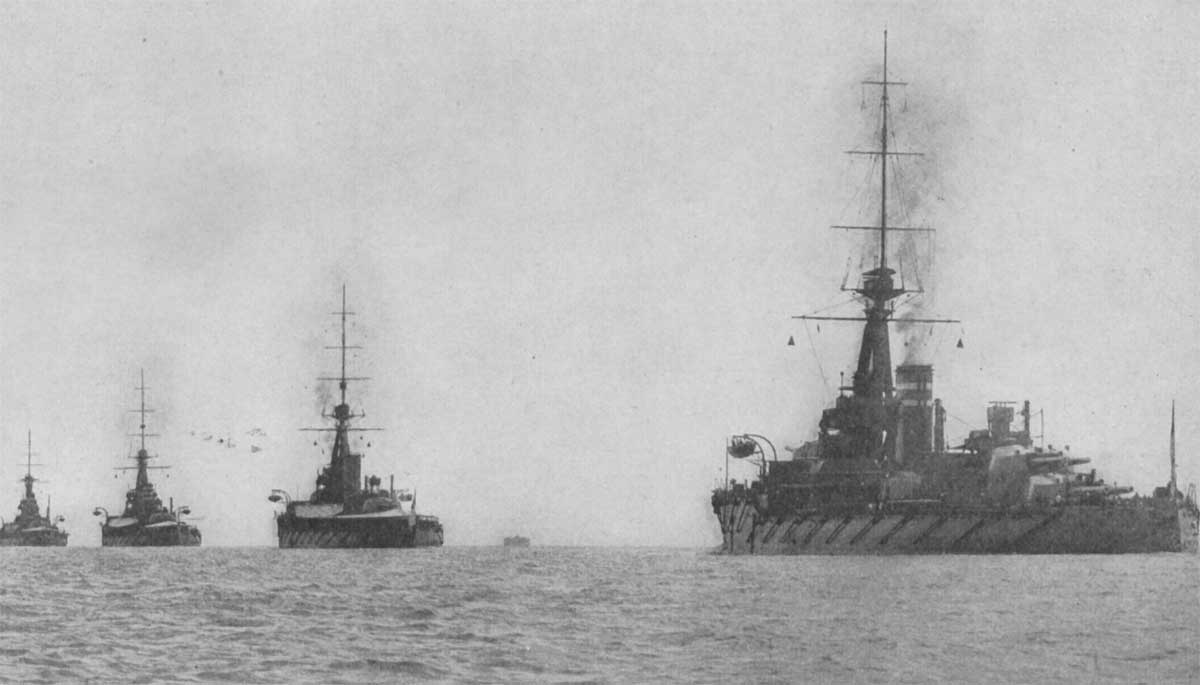
- 2nd Battle Squadron in 1914
- Active: 1912–1944
- Country: United Kingdom
- Branch: Royal Navy
- Size: Squadron
- Engagements: Battle of Jutland

The 2nd Battle Squadron was a naval squadron of the British Royal Navy consisting of battleships. The 2nd Battle Squadron was initially part of the Royal Navy's Grand Fleet. After World War I the Grand Fleet was reverted to its original name, the Atlantic Fleet. The squadron changed composition often as ships were damaged, retired or transferred.

== History ==
=== First World War ===
As an element in the Grand Fleet, the Squadron participated in the Battle of Jutland.

==== August 1914 ====
On 5 August 1914, the squadron was constituted as follows:

- HMS King George V
- HMS Ajax
- HMS Audacious
- HMS Centurion
- HMS Conqueror
- HMS Monarch
- HMS Orion
- HMS Thunderer

==== Battle of Jutland, June 1916 ====
As an element in the Grand Fleet, the Squadron participated in the Battle of Jutland. During the Battle of Jutland, the composition of the 2nd Battle Squadron was as follows:

- First Division
- HMS King George V Flagship of Vice Admiral Sir Martyn Jerram; Captain F. L. Field;
- HMS Ajax Captain G. H. Baird;
- HMS Centurion Captain M. Culme-Seymour;
- HMS Erin Captain the Honourable V. A. Stanley;
- Second Division
- HMS Orion Flagship of Rear Admiral A. C. Leveson; Captain O. Backhouse;
- HMS Monarch Captain G. H. Borrett;
- HMS Conqueror Captain H. H. D. Tothill;
- HMS Thunderer Captain J. A. Fergusson.

==== January 1918 ====
By 1918, HMS Agincourt had been transferred from the 1st Battle Squadron.

=== Second World War ===
==== September 1939 ====
By this time the squadron was in the Home Fleet and consisted of:

- HMS Royal Oak Flagship of Rear Admiral Henry Blagrove; Captain W.G. Benn;
- HMS Royal Sovereign Captain L. V. Morgan;
- HMS Ramillies Captain H. T. Baillie-Grohman;
- HMS Nelson Captain G. J. A. Miles;
- HMS Rodney Captain E. N. Syfret.

== Admirals commanding ==
Commanders were as follows:

- Vice-Admiral Sir John Jellicoe (May–December 1912)
- Vice-Admiral Sir George Warrender (1912–15)
- Vice-Admiral Sir Martyn Jerram (1915–16)
- Vice-Admiral Sir John de Robeck (1916–19)
- Vice-Admiral Sir Henry Oliver (March–April 1919)
- Vice-Admiral Sir Arthur Leveson (1919–20)
- Vice-Admiral Sir William Nicholson (1920–21)
- Rear-Admiral Reginald Drax (1929–30)
- Rear-Admiral Charles Little (1930–31)
- Rear-Admiral Wilfred French (1931–32)
- Rear-Admiral Ragnar Colvin (1932–33)
- Rear-Admiral Max Horton (1933–35)
- Rear-Admiral Charles Ramsey (1935–37)
- Vice-Admiral Lachlan MacKinnon (1937–39)
- Rear-Admiral Lancelot Holland (January–September 1939)
- Rear-Admiral Henry Blagrove (September–October 1939)
- Vice-Admiral Sir Alban Curteis (1941–42)
- Vice-Admiral Sir Bruce Fraser (1942–43)
- Vice-Admiral Sir Henry Moore (1943–44)

== Rear-Admirals Second-in-Command ==
Post holders included:

- Rear-Admiral Herbert G. King-Hall, 29 March 1912 – 29 October 1912
- Rear-Admiral The Hon. Rosslyn E. Wemyss, 29 October 1912 – 28 October 1913
- Rear-Admiral Sir Robert K. Arbuthnot, Bart., 28 October 1913 – January 1915
- Rear-Admiral Arthur C. Leveson, 17 January 1915 – 4 December 1916
- Rear-Admiral Sir William E. Goodenough, 5 December 1916 – 31 March 1919
- Rear-Admiral Sir Douglas R. L. Nicholson, 1 April 1919 – 7 April 1919
- Rear-Admiral Lewis Clinton-Baker, 8 April 1919
- Rear-Admiral Edward B. Kiddle, 1 April 1920 – 8 April 1921
- Rear-Admiral Francis H. Mitchell, 5 May 1925 – 5 May 1926
- Rear-Admiral Charles J. C. Little, 26 April 1930 – 25 April 1931
- Rear-Admiral Lancelot E. Holland, 10 January 1939 – 25 August 1939
- Rear-Admiral Henry E. C. Blagrove, 25 August 1939 – 2 October 1939

== Sources ==
- Dittmar, Frederick J; Colledge, J J (1972). British Warships 1914–1919. London: Ian Allan Publishing. ISBN 978-0-7110-0380-4.
- MacIntyre, Donald (1977). Jutland (Reprint ed.). London: Evans Brothers. ISBN 978-0-330-20142-1.
- Niehorster, Leo; Donald Kindell; Mark E Horan (5 January 2001). "British and Dominion Royal Navies, Home Fleet order of battle 3 September 1939". World War II at Orbat.com.
