= Frank Mitchell =

Frank Mitchell may refer to:

== Performers ==
- Frank Mitchell (actor) (1905–1991), American member of comedy team Mitchell and Durant
- Frank Mitchell (musician) (c.1945–c.1971), American jazz saxophonist
- Frank Mitchell (presenter) (born 1960), Northern Irish TV personality

== Public officials ==
- Frank William Drew Mitchell (1845–1936), Australian-born British Secretary and health writer, a/k/a F.W.D. Mitchell
- Frank Mitchell (Canadian politician) (1925–2021), British Columbia legislator
- Frank Mitchell (American politician), North Carolina legislator since 1990s, a/k/a W. Franklin Mitchell

== Sportsmen ==
- Frank Mitchell (sportsman, born 1872) (1872–1935), English cricketer and rugby union player
- Frank Mitchell (striker), English footballer during late 1890s
- Sir Frank Herbert Mitchell (1878–1951), English cricketer and member of British Royal household, 1920–1931
- Frank Mitchell (goalkeeper) (1890–1958), Scottish footballer (Liverpool, Everton, Motherwell)
- Frank Mitchell (bowls) (1911–after 1958), South African lawn bowler
- Frank Mitchell (sportsman, born 1922) (1922–1984), Australian-born association footballer and county cricketer

== Others ==
- Frank Mitchell (geologist) (1912–1997), Irish naturalist, conservationist and writer, a/k/a George Francis Mitchell
- Frank N. Mitchell (1921–1950), American Marine, Korean War Medal of Honor recipient
- Frank Mitchell (prisoner) (c.1929–1966), English criminal, associate of Kray twins, known as "The Mad Axeman"

== See also ==
- Franklin Mitchell (disambiguation)
- Francis Mitchell (disambiguation)
