= Frederick Luke =

- Born: 29 September 1895; Lockerley, Hampshire
- Died: 12 March 1983 (aged 87); Glasgow, Scotland
- Burial place: Linn Crematorium, Glasgow
- Military career
- Allegiance: United Kingdom
- Branch: British Army
- Service years: 1913–1919
- Rank: Sergeant
- Units: Royal Field Artillery; Royal Air Force
- Conflicts: World War I World War II
- Awards: Victoria Cross

Frederick Luke VC (29 September 1895 – 12 March 1983) was an English recipient of the Victoria Cross, the highest and most prestigious award for gallantry in the face of the enemy that can be awarded to British and Commonwealth forces.

== Details ==
He was 18 years old, and a Driver in the 37th Battery, Royal Field Artillery, British Army during the First World War when the following deed took place for which he was awarded the VC.

On 26 August 1914 at Le Cateau, France, when a captain (Douglas Reynolds) of the same battery was trying to save two guns which had been recaptured, Driver Luke and two other drivers (Job Henry Charles Drain and Ben Cobey) volunteered to help and gave great assistance in the eventual saving of one of the guns. At the time they were under heavy fire from the enemy who were only 100 yards (91 m) away.

He later achieved the rank of sergeant and served during World War II as a ground gunner with the Royal Air Force.

Fred Luke was a guest of honour of 93 Le cateau Field Battery shortly before his death when members of the battery were awed to meet him. Gnrs Raymond Pulman and Peter Jackson formed a special guard of honour on that day.

For a number of years until his death on 12 March 1983, Frederick Luke was listed in the Guinness Book of World Records as the oldest living holder of the Victoria Cross.

== The medal ==
His VC is on display in the Lord Ashcroft Gallery at the Imperial War Museum, London.
