= Peter Dickens =

Royal Navy officer (1917–1987)

Captain Peter Dickens DSO MBE DSC
- Captain Peter Dickens RN in the 1960s
- Born: 6 April 1917; Fulham, London, England
- Died: 25 May 1987 (aged 70); Tunbridge Wells, Kent, England
- Spouse: Mary Alice Blagrove
- Military career
- Allegiance: United Kingdom
- Branch: Royal Navy
- Rank: Captain
- Conflicts: World War II
- Awards: Distinguished Service Order; Member of the Order of the British Empire; Distinguished Service Cross; Mentioned in dispatches (x 4)

Peter Gerald Charles Dickens (6 April 1917 – 25 May 1987) was an English Royal Navy officer during World War II and a great-grandson of novelist Charles Dickens.

== Life and career ==
The son of Admiral Sir Gerald Charles Dickens and Kathleen Pearl Birch, Peter Dickens was born in Fulham in London in 1917. Dickens joined the Royal Navy as a naval cadet in September 1934, being promoted to midshipman in May 1935, when he was serving aboard HMS Nelson in the Home Fleet. Dickens was acting sub-lieutenant in September 1937 and sub-lieutenant in May 1938 while serving aboard the Royal Yacht HMY Victoria and Albert in Portsmouth. In 1940 he took part in the evacuation from Dunkirk.

From June 1942, Dickens was the commanding officer of HM MTB 234 and the senior officer of 21st MTB Flotilla when, in August 1942, he was awarded the MBE for saving his mined ship through damage control, and the Distinguished Service Cross in December 1942 for attacks on enemy shipping. In July 1943 he was awarded the Distinguished Service Order for skilful and daring attacks "in enemy coastal waters".

Dickens was the commanding officer of HMS Blencathra from April 1944 to July 1945 and was promoted to lieutenant commander on 20 March 1945 with seniority from 1 December 1944. He then transferred to the Staff of RN College, Eaton and later RN College, Dartmouth, where he served from July 1945 to 1948. Promotion to commander came in June 1947, and he served on the staff of the Commander-in-Chief, Far East Station, until April 1952 when he was appointed commanding officer of HMS Gabbard, and from 1953 to April 1954 of HMS Scorpion. From April 1955 to January 1956 he was based at HMS President, a shore establishment, and was promoted to captain in December 1955 before being appointed Assistant Deputy Chief of Staff (Plans), Allied Forces Mediterranean (NATO) at Malta from October 1956 to January 1957.

He was a staff officer for NATO based at İzmir from 1958 to 1959, and from 1959 to 1961 was the commanding officer of HMS Delight. Dickens was captain of Chatham Dockyard and Queen's Harbour Master and chief staff officer to Rear Admiral Beloe between March 1961 to February 1964, and served as naval aide-de-camp to Queen Elizabeth II from July 1964 to January 1965.

Peter Dickens was the president of the Dickens Fellowship, a worldwide association of people who share an interest in the life and works of Charles Dickens, and was president of the Coastal Forces Association. With his wife, Mary Alice Blagrove (the daughter of Rear-Admiral Henry Blagrove), he is the grandfather of the actor Harry Lloyd and uncle to the actor/performer Gerald Charles Dickens.

Dickens died in 1987 at Tunbridge Wells in Kent.

== Publications ==
- 'HMS Hesperus' Profile Publications (1972)
- 'Night Action : MTB Flotilla at War' Bantam Books (1974) ISBN 0-553-14764-1
- 'Narvik : Battles in the Fjords' Classics of Naval Literature. U.S. Naval Institute (1974) ISBN 1-55750-744-9.
- 'SAS : the Jungle Frontier : 22 Special Air Service Regiment in the Borneo Campaign, 1963–1966' (1983)

== Honours and awards ==
- 19 July 1940 – Mentioned in Dispatches – Lieutenant Peter Gerald Charles Dickens, Royal Navy – for naval operations off the coast of Norway.
- 11 June 1942 – Mentioned in Dispatches – Lieutenant Peter Gerald Charles Dickens, Royal Navy – As Celebration of His Majesty's Birthday, for outstanding zeal, patience and cheerfulness, and for never failing to set an example of wholehearted devotion to duty, without which the high tradition of the Royal Navy could not be upheld.
- 11 August 1942 – Member of the Order of the British Empire Lieutenant Peter Gerald Charles Dickens, Royal Navy – For bravery and devotion to duty.
- 29 December 1942 – Distinguished Service Cross – Lieutenant Peter Gerald Charles Dickens, M.B.E., Royal Navy – For courage and skill in attacks on enemy shipping off the French coast.
- 13 April 1943 – Mentioned in Dispatches – Lieutenant Peter Gerald Charles Dickens, M.B.E., D.S.C., Royal Navy – For good services in action against the enemy off the Dutch Coast.
- 22 June 1943 – Mentioned in Dispatches – Lieutenant Peter Gerald Charles Dickens, M.B.E., D.S.C., Royal Navy – For bravery and skill in a successful attack of enemy shipping, while serving in light coastal forces.
- 13 July 1943 – Companion of the Distinguished Service Order – Lieutenant Peter Gerald Charles Dickens, M.B.E., D.S.C., Royal Navy – For skill and daring in many successful attacks on enemy forces, made in enemy waters, while serving in light coastal craft.

== See also ==
- Dickens family
