= Franklin Mitchell =

Franklin Mitchell may refer to:

- Franklin Mitchell (Wisconsin politician) (1824–1911), Wisconsin State Assemblyman
- W. Franklin Mitchell, American politician in North Carolina
- Frank Mitchell (politician) (1925-2021), politician in British Columbia, Canada

== See also ==
- Frank Mitchell (disambiguation)
