= Ben Cobey =

British soldier (1895–1914)

- Born: 10 March 1895; Maldon, United Kingdom
- Died: 26 August 1914 (aged 19); Le Cateau, France
- Cause of death: Killed in action
- Resting place: Unknown

Ben Cobey (10 March 1895 – 26 August 1914) was a British soldier who served in the First World War and was killed in the Battle of Le Cateau. Cobey's memory has attracted substantial attention in the 21st century, including a campaign to see him receive a posthumous Victoria Cross.

== Early life ==
Cobey was born out of wedlock on 10 March 1895 in Maldon, Essex.

== Military service and death ==
Following the outbreak of the First World War, Cobey enlisted in the British Army and was assigned to the 8th Royal Field Artillery.

During the Battle of Le Cateau on 26 August 1914, Cobey was one of three soldiers who volunteered to assist Captain Douglas Reynolds in retrieving an artillery piece from the advancing German army; the other two volunteers were Job Henry Charles Drain and Frederick Luke. After successfully retrieving the piece, the group headed back out to retrieve another. While returning with the second piece, Cobey was struck by a bullet and killed.

Reynolds, Drain, and Luke each received the Victoria Cross for their actions; Cobey did not, and no mention of him was made in the official Victoria Cross citation.

On 26 August 1914 at Le Cateau, France, Captain Reynolds took up two teams with volunteer drivers, to recapture two British guns and limbered up two guns under heavy artillery and infantry fire. Although the enemy was within 100 yards he managed, with the help of two drivers (Job Henry Charles Drain and Frederick Luke), to get one gun away safely. On 9 September at Pysloup, he reconnoitered at close range, discovered a battery which was holding up the advance and silenced it.

== Legacy ==
Cobey's mother was not informed of his death for nine months.

Cobey's name was omitted from Maldon War Memorial, and from the memorial at St Mary's Church, likely because he was born out of wedlock. Cobey's name was added to Maldon War Memorial in 2014, and to the memorial in St Mary's Church in 2018. Also in 2018, a street in the town was named Ben Cobey Street.

Cobey's relatives have campaigned for him to receive a posthumous Victoria Cross. In 2014, the campaign was taken up by The Maldon and Burnham Standard. The newspaper's campaign attracted national press attention, including from the BBC; and drew support from local MP John Whittingdale, and the grandson of Cobey's comrade Drain.

Cobey appears in the painting Saving the Guns at Le Cateau by Terence Cuneo.
