= Job Henry Charles Drain =

Recipient of the Victoria Cross

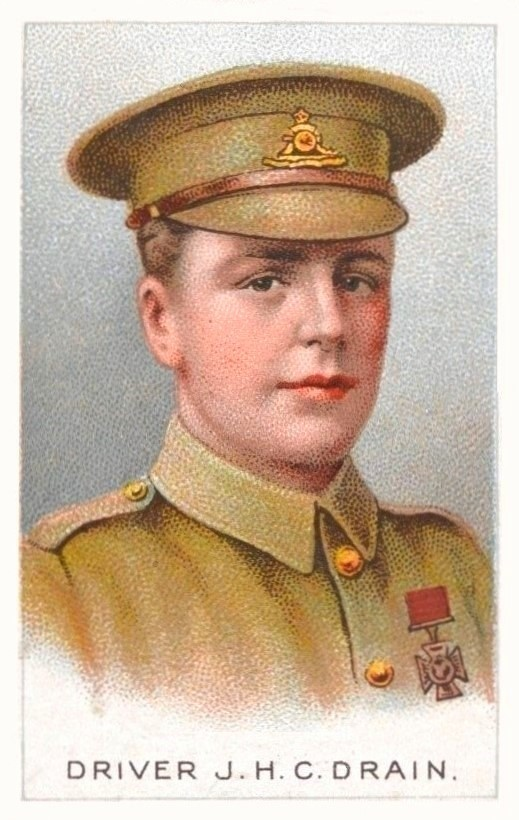
- Born: 15 October 1895; Barking, Essex
- Died: 26 July 1975 (aged 79); Barking
- Burial place: Rippleside Cemetery, Barking
- Military career
- Allegiance: United Kingdom
- Branch: British Army
- Service years: 1912–1919
- Rank: Sergeant
- Units: Royal Field Artillery
- Conflicts: World War I
- Awards: Victoria Cross

Job Henry Charles Drain VC (15 October 1895 – 26 July 1975) was an English recipient of the Victoria Cross, the highest and most prestigious award for gallantry in the face of the enemy that can be awarded to British and Commonwealth forces.

== Biography ==
Drain was born on 15 October 1895 in Barking, Essex. He was 18 years old, and a Driver in the 37th Battery, Royal Field Artillery, British Army during the First World War when the following deed took place for which he was awarded the VC.

=== Victoria Cross ===
On 26 August 1914 at Le Cateau, France, when a captain (Douglas Reynolds) of the same battery was trying to recapture two guns, Driver Drain two other drivers (Frederick Luke and Ben Cobey) volunteered to help and gave great assistance in the eventual saving of one of the guns. At the time they were under heavy artillery and infantry fire from the enemy who were only 100 yards (91 m) away.

Drain later achieved the rank of Sergeant. He died on 26 July 1975, and is buried at Rippleside Cemetery, Barking.

=== Memorials ===
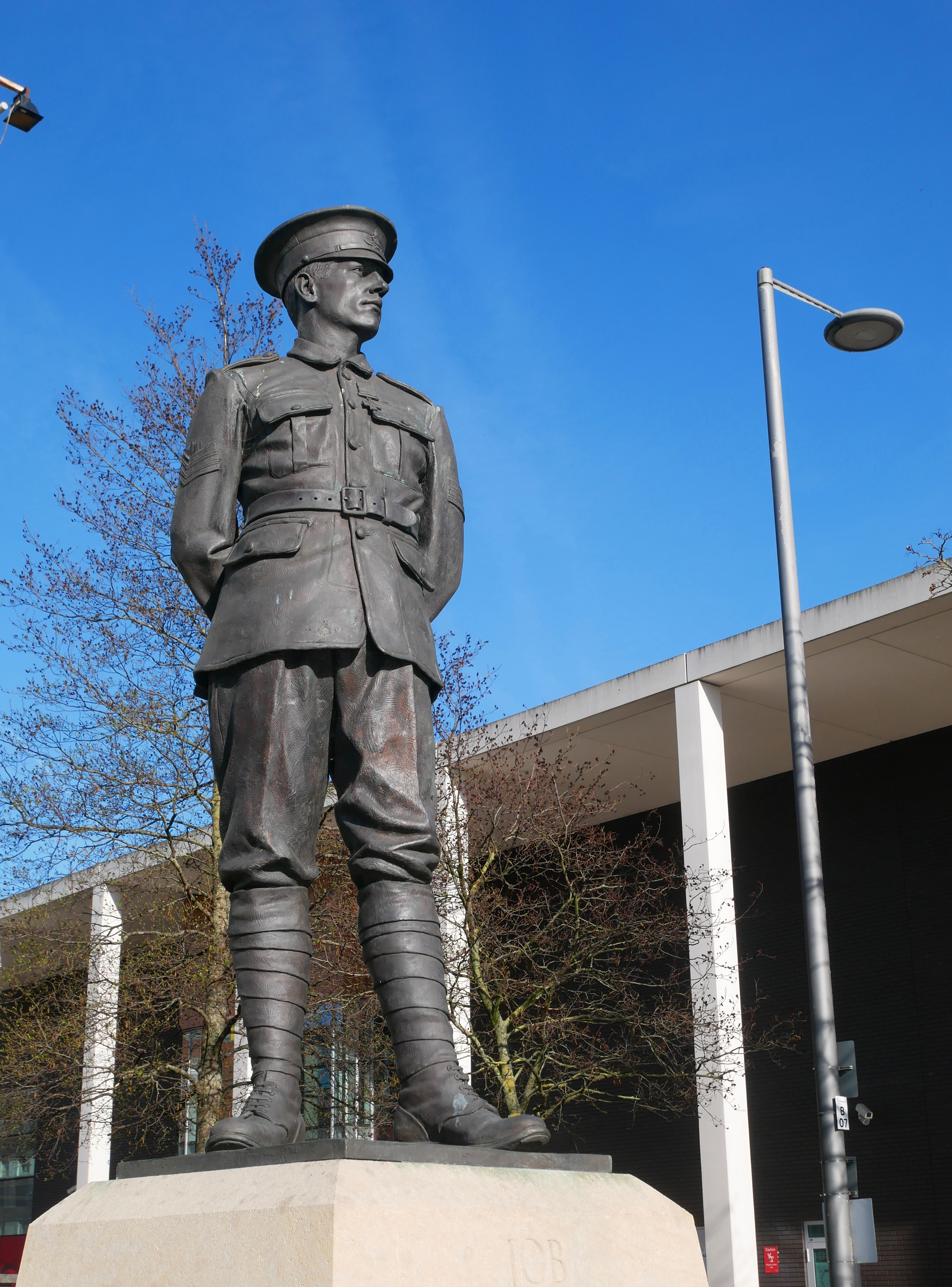
Drain's statue in Barking

Drain was a resident of Barking, Essex. In autumn 2009, a statue of him was erected on Broadway, Barking. A blue heritage plaque was also erected at his last residence in Greatfields Road.

His VC is on display in the Lord Ashcroft Gallery at the Imperial War Museum, London.

== Bibliography ==
- Buzzell, Nora, ed. (1997). The Register of the Victoria Cross. Cheltenham, Gloucestershire: This England Alma House. ISBN 0-906324-27-0.
- Gliddon, Gerald (2011) [1994]. 1914. VCs of the First World War. Stroud, Gloucestershire: The History Press. ISBN 978-0752459080.
- Harvey, David (2000). Monuments to Courage. Naval & Military Press Ltd. ISBN 1-84342-356-1.
