= Francis Mitchell (British Army officer) =

British Army general (1904–1954)

Major-General Francis Mitchell CB CBE DSO
- Born: 1904
- Died: 15 September 1954 (aged 49–50); Germany
- Relatives: Admiral Francis Mitchell (father); Dame Mona Mitchell (daughter); Reverend Patrick Mitchell (cousin)
- Military career
- Allegiance: United Kingdom
- Branch: British Army
- Service years: 1924–1954
- Rank: Major-General
- Service number: 30902
- Unit: 15th/19th The King's Royal Hussars
- Commands: 6th Armoured Division (1953–1954); 22nd Armoured Brigade (1947–1949); 26th Armoured Brigade (1944–1945); 1st Royal Gloucestershire Hussars (1942)
- Conflicts: Second World War
- Awards: Companion of the Order of the Bath; Commander of the Order of the British Empire; Distinguished Service Order; Mentioned in Despatches

Major-General Francis Neville Mitchell, CB, CBE, DSO (1904 – 15 September 1954) was a British Army officer who commanded the 6th Armoured Division from 1953 until his death in 1954.

== Military career ==
Born the eldest son of Admiral Francis Mitchell and a cousin of Patrick Mitchell, Mitchell graduated from the Royal Military College, Sandhurst and was commissioned into the 15th/19th The King's Royal Hussars in 1924.

Mitchell served in the Second World War as an instructor at the Staff College, Camberley from 1940, as a general staff officer with the 9th Armoured Division from 1941 and as commanding officer of the 1st Royal Gloucestershire Hussars from 1942. He was appointed commander of the 26th Armoured Brigade in Italy in 1944, and assistant deputy adjutant-general at Allied Forces Headquarters in 1945. At the end of the war he was appointed a Commander of the Order of the British Empire.

Mitchell went on to be commander of the 22nd Armoured Brigade in 1947, brigadier Royal Armoured Corps for the British Army of the Rhine in 1949 and chief of staff for I (British) Corps in Germany in 1951. His last appointment was as general officer commanding 6th Armoured Division in 1953 before his sudden death in a horse riding accident in Germany in 1954.

== Family ==
In 1935 Mitchell married Ann Christian Livingstone-Learmouth. Their daughter Mona served as Private Secretary to Princess Alexandra, The Honourable Lady Ogilvy, from 1974 until 1991, and was appointed a Dame Commander of the Royal Victorian Order on retirement. Francis Mitchell's grandfather, Colonel Herbert Leonard Mitchell, married Mary Arabella Susan Reynolds, the niece of Major General John William Reynolds and the granddaughter of General Charles Reynolds. His brother, Lieutenant Commander David Reynolds Mitchell, was killed one week before the end of the Second World War. He was the cousin of Major Douglas Reynolds, a Victoria Cross recipient.

Military offices
Preceded by George Prior-Palmer	GOC 6th Armoured Division; 1953–1955	Succeeded by Roderick McLeod
