= Arthur Leveson =

Royal Navy Admiral; Commander in Chief, China Station (1868–1929)

Admiral Sir Arthur Leveson GCB
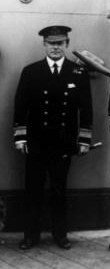
- Arthur Leveson as Rear Admiral Commanding HM Australian Fleet
- Born: 27 January 1868; Kensington, London, England
- Died: 26 June 1929 (aged 61); Contrexéville, France
- Military career
- Allegiance: United Kingdom
- Branch: Royal Navy
- Service years: 1881–1928
- Rank: Admiral
- Commands: China Station (1922–25); 2nd Battle Squadron (1919–20); 5th Battle Squadron (1918–19); HM Australian Fleet (1917–18); HMS Indefatigable (1911–13); HMS Africa (1908–19); HMS King Edward VII (1905–07)
- Conflicts: First World War: Battle of Jutland
- Awards: Knight Grand Cross of the Order of the Bath; Mentioned in dispatches Officer of the Legion of Honour (France); Order of Saint Stanislaus, 1st Class (Russia); Order of the Rising Sun, 2nd Class (Japan)

Admiral Sir Arthur Cavenagh Leveson GCB (27 January 1868 – 26 June 1929) was a senior officer in the Royal Navy. He was the Rear Admiral Commanding His Majesty's Australian Fleet from 9 January 1917 to 3 September 1918 and later Commander in Chief, China Station from 10 September 1922 to 22 April 1925.

== Naval career ==
Born on 27 January 1868 at Kensington, London, he attended a private school, and began his naval cadetship aboard the training ship HMS Britannia on 13 January 1881. He was rated midshipman on 15 January 1883 and sub-lieutenant on 17 January 1887 and promoted lieutenant on 27 July 1887. He was awarded the Beaufort Testimonial and Goodenough Medal in 1888 and qualified in gunnery in 1891.

Serving as a Gunnery Lieutenant upon HMS Victoria in 1893, he survived the sinking of HMS Victoria on 22 June 1893 after she collided with HMS Camperdown near Tripoli, Lebanon during manoeuvres and quickly sank, taking 358 crew with her, including the commander of the British Mediterranean Fleet, Vice Admiral Sir George Tryon.

He was transferred to Whale Island at the shore establishment HMS Excellent as a 1st Gunnery Office. He was promoted to lieutenant on 27 July 1887. While as a Brigade Major to the Naval Brigade in London, he participated in the occasion of Queen Victoria's Diamond Jubilee in 1897, for which he received the Queen Victoria Diamond Jubilee Medal. Promoted to commander on 1 January 1899 he became a fellow of the Royal Geographical Society. Serving as commander under his first commission aboard HMS Canopus he was promoted to captain on 1 July 1903.

From August 1903 until February 1905, he served as the Naval Assistant to the Controller of the Navy. While serving as Flag Captain to Admiral Sir William May, Commander in Chief of the Atlantic Fleet, he took part in 1904 in the Entente Cordiale at Brest and in Paris, for which he received the Croix d'Officier of the Legion of Honour. He later commanded HMS Africa and HMS Indefatigable and received the Coronation Medal of King George V in 1911.

On 27 September 1912, he was made a Companion of the Order of the Bath in the Civil Division in the first batch of naval officers awarded this honour, and was made naval aide-de-camp to King George V in 1913. He was also a commodore (first class) on the staff of Admiral of the Fleet Sir William May, Umpire-in-Chief during the Naval Manoeuvres which took place during July and August 1913. Promoted to rear admiral on 1 December 1913, and Director of Operations Divisions of the Admiralty War Staff on 1 May 1914.

After the outbreak of the First World War in 1914, he was second in command of the 2nd Battle Squadron, and was present at the Battle of Jutland on 31 May 1916, where he was Mentioned in dispatches, received a Companion of the Order of the Bath in the Military Division (CB), the Order of St. Stanislaus (First Class) with swords and the Order of the Rising Sun (Second Class).

He was appointed the Rear Admiral Commanding HM Australian Fleet in January 1917, commander of the 5th Battle Squadron in October 1918 and commander of the 2nd Battle Squadron in April 1919. He was appointed Commander in Chief, China Station in September 1922. He became the First and Principal Naval aide-de-camp and was promoted to Knight Grand Cross of the Order of the Bath (GCB) in the 1927 Birthday Honours.

== Family ==
Leveson married, at St. Paul's, Valletta, Malta, on 3 March 1902, Jemima Adeline Beatrice Blackwood, widow of Edward Henry Stuart Bligh, 7th Earl of Darnley, and daughter of Francis James Lindesay Blackwood. They had one son, Arthur Edmund Leveson (1908–1981), and their eldest granddaughter, Anne Pamela Leveson (born 1946), became Countess of Hopetoun by her marriage in 1968 to the 4th Marquess of Linlithgow, and in 1988 became Countess De La Warr by her second marriage to William Sackville, 11th Earl De La Warr.

Admiral Sir Arthur Leveson died on 26 June 1929 at Contrexéville, France.

== Notes ==
Military offices
Preceded by Sir William Pakenham	Rear Admiral Commanding HM Australian Fleet; 1917–1918	Succeeded by Sir Lionel Halsey
Preceded by Sir Alexander Duff	Commander-in-Chief, China Station; 1922–1924	Succeeded by Sir Allan Everett
Honorary titles
Preceded by Sir Montague Browning	First and Principal Naval Aide-de-Camp; 1926–1928	Succeeded by Sir Richard Phillimore
