= Henry Blagrove =

British Second World War admiral

Rear-Admiral Henry Blagrove
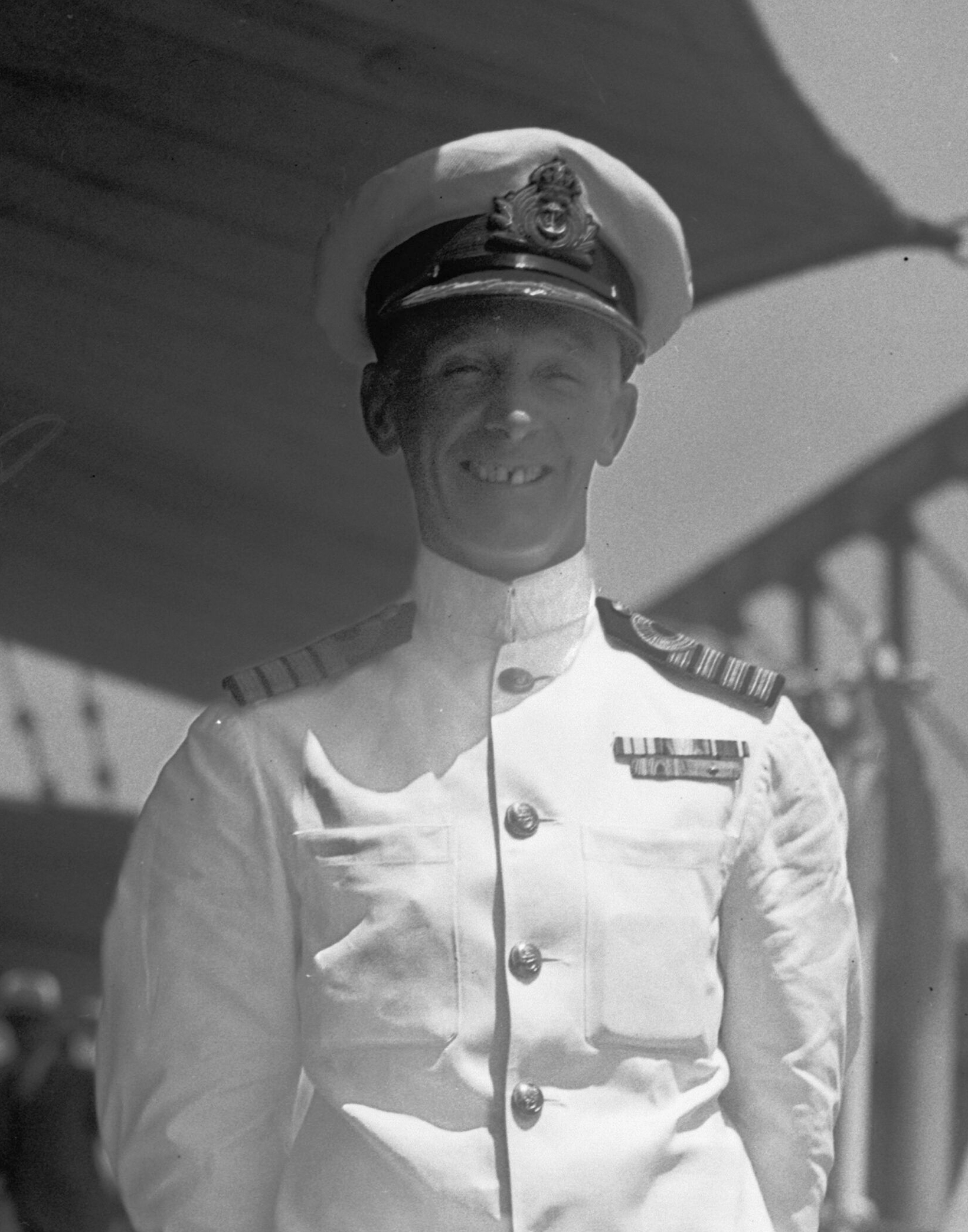
- Born: 26 April 1887; Harbledown, Kent, UK
- Died: 14 October 1939 (aged 52); Scapa Flow, Orkney Islands
- Military career
- Allegiance: United Kingdom
- Branch: Royal Navy
- Service years: 1902–1939
- Rank: Rear-Admiral
- Commands: HMS Curacoa; HMS Norfolk; HMS Sussex; 2nd Battle Squadron
- Conflicts: First World War: Battle of Dogger Bank; Battle of Jutland; Second World War: Sinking of HMS Royal Oak †

Rear-Admiral Henry Evelyn Charles Blagrove (26 April 1887 – 14 October 1939) was the first British Royal Navy officer of flag rank to be killed in the Second World War. An experienced staff officer and veteran of several actions of the First World War aboard the battlecruiser HMS Tiger, Blagrove had only just received his appointment as commander of the 2nd Battle Squadron of the Home Fleet when he was killed in the destruction of his flagship HMS Royal Oak by German submarine U-47.

== Biography ==
=== Early life ===
Henry Blagrove was born to Colonel Henry John Blagrove, CB of the 13th Hussars and Alice Evelyn Blagrove née Boothby at Harbledown, Kent in April 1887. His family owned the Blagrove Estate in the Browns Town & Orange Valley of St Ann's Jamaica. It had formerly been a slave plantation.

In 1902 aged 14 he entered the naval service and trained at Britannia, joining HMS Good Hope as a naval cadet in 1903 aged 16. Three years later Blagrove left the ship as an acting sub-lieutenant and after taking examinations served over the next three years in the Good Hope again, HMS Sapphire, HMS Arab and HMS Invincible until promotion to lieutenant in 1909.

=== First World War ===
Following promotion to lieutenant Blagrove saw brief service aboard HMS Highflyer, HMS Fox and the battleship Vengeance, before serving at the Royal Naval College, Dartmouth, where the outbreak of the First World War found him. After briefly serving in the Majestic Blagrove was appointed to HMS Tiger, a ship which was being completed for service in the 1st Battlecruiser Squadron under Vice-Admiral Sir David Beatty.

Five months after joining Tiger Blagrove saw his first action in the Battle of Dogger Bank on 24 January 1915. Tiger fired several hundred shells during the action, but her overall performance was poor, scoring few hits and suffering the loss of ten men to German counter fire. Nevertheless, Tiger was involved in the battle's final moments as the stricken German armoured cruiser SMS Blücher heeled over and sank with nearly 800 lives. In late May 1916, a much improved Tiger became involved in the war's largest naval action, the Battle of Jutland. Tiger took at least 15 hits but only suffering 24 fatalities. The battle as a whole was a confusing affair without a clear victor but within 24 hours Tiger had recovered sufficiently from her damage to be able to return to active service.

In November 1917 Blagrove was transferred to HMS Queen Elizabeth. Unlike the battlecruisers in Rosyth, Queen Elizabeth was stationed in Scapa Flow in the Orkney Islands and it was there that Blagrove met his future wife Edith Lowe, who was serving as a Wren. The couple would be married in 1921 and later have two daughters. Aboard Queen Elizabeth, Blagrove served out the war, being present at the surrender of the German High Seas Fleet. During the war he was promoted first to lieutenant-commander in 1917 and commander in 1919. Blagrove was also awarded the Italian Silver Medal for Valour in 1917. He departed Queen Elizabeth in 1920 and was borne on the books of HMS President during which he oversaw attended to junior officers studying at Cambridge University, and later served in the office of the Second Sea Lord.

=== Inter-war service ===
In 1922, Blagrove joined HMS Excellent for a training course and then joined HMS Cardiff for his first posting aboard her, later being removed to HMS Ceres as her temporary captain for a month and then returned to Cardiff as her executive officer until January 1925. Further staff and training appointments followed, Blagrove being stationed at HMS Victory, HMS President and HMS Pembroke before being given command of HMS Curacoa in 1927 and promoted to captain. In 1932, after several staff appointments, Blagrove was briefly placed in command of HMS Norfolk and was then returned to shore duties at the Admiralty in 1934.

In 1937, Blagrove spent a year commanding HMS Sussex (96) and in 1938 was given the promotion to rear-admiral and placed on the staff of the Admiral Superintendent at Chatham Dockyard after a period as Naval Aide-de-Camp to King George VI. In January 1939 with war impending, Blagrove was given command of the 2nd Battle Squadron, consisting of the battleships HMS Royal Oak and HMS Royal Sovereign stationed at Scapa Flow. Training and preparing his force in the run up to and opening weeks of the Second World War, Blagrove proved himself a capable and efficient officer, despite some doubts regarding his quiet personality and consequent suitability for service in a seagoing command.

=== Death aboard Royal Oak ===
HMS Royal Oak was sunk late on the night of 13 October 1939 after the German submarine U-47 entered Scapa Flow by bypassing its blockship defences. Initially Kapitänleutnant Günther Prien, the commander of U-47, had been disappointed to find that the Royal Naval anchorage was largely empty; this was the result of a recent order from Admiral Charles Forbes to clear Scapa Flow in case of air attack. However Royal Oak was retained because she carried a large battery of anti-aircraft guns.

On sighting the battleship, Prien began his first attack run at 00:58hrs by firing three torpedoes. Only one caused a glancing blow on the bow of Royal Oak. An alarm was raised aboard ship, however, it was mistakenly given for "danger of a potential internal explosion" not for a submarine attack. When no explosion seemed likely, most crew members returned to their bunks. At 01:13hrs Prien began his second run. This time all three torpedoes struck Royal Oak amidships causing a huge explosion followed by a severe list to starboard. Prien used the ensuing confusion to escape from Scapa Flow.

As the crew scrambled to leave the stricken battleship, rescue boats set out from the shore as nearby ships responded. However the darkness, oil slick and low water temperature meant that many of those who did escape the ship drowned before they could be rescued. Royal Oak rolled over and sank 15 minutes after being hit.

A total of 835 crew were killed in the disaster, a further 386 were rescued. Rear-Admiral Blagrove was not among the survivors. His body was not recovered and the manner of his death is unknown. Blagrove's family became aware of the sinking from newspaper billboards in Edinburgh the following day but were not overly concerned for his safety. They were notified of his death 24 hours later.

== Legacy ==
Blagrove's name is included on the Portsmouth Naval Memorial as his remains were never recovered. His actual gravesite, the wreck of Royal Oak, is a protected war grave and a memorial to all the men who died aboard her stands in St. Magnus Cathedral on the Orkney Islands. The islanders themselves also maintain the memory of those lost on the battleship and an annual ceremony remembers them at the site of the wreck. Blagrove's widow later worked on the efforts to break the codes of the German Enigma machine at Bletchley Park, and his family have made several visits to the Islands to commemorate their father's memory.

Rear-Admiral Henry Blagrove was an efficient, able and popular officer whose service record contains few blemishes and many commendations. His untimely death ended a promising and successful career. One of his commanding officers, on recommending him for captain in 1927, indicated his character with the assessment:

Above average. An exceptionally good officer which has caused me to recommend him strongly for promotion. Very good powers of leadership - exerts an excellent influence - is tactful & easy to deal with. Cheerful, energetic & frank personality. Physically fit – plays & is interested in all games. He has been a Rugger player of a high order & understands the game. Socially popular & much liked in the mess. He has extraordinary energy & organising capacity, and a brain capacity above the average. Recommended for further employment in a more responsible position.

=== Descendants ===
Blagrove's wife was Edith Gordon Lowe, who was Scottish, from Edinburgh. Their daughter, Mary Alice Blagrove, married Royal Navy officer Peter Gerald Charles Dickens. Blagrove's great-grandson is actor Harry Lloyd.
