= Francis Mitchell (Royal Navy officer) =

Royal Navy Admiral (1876–1946)

Admiral Francis Mitchell CB DSO
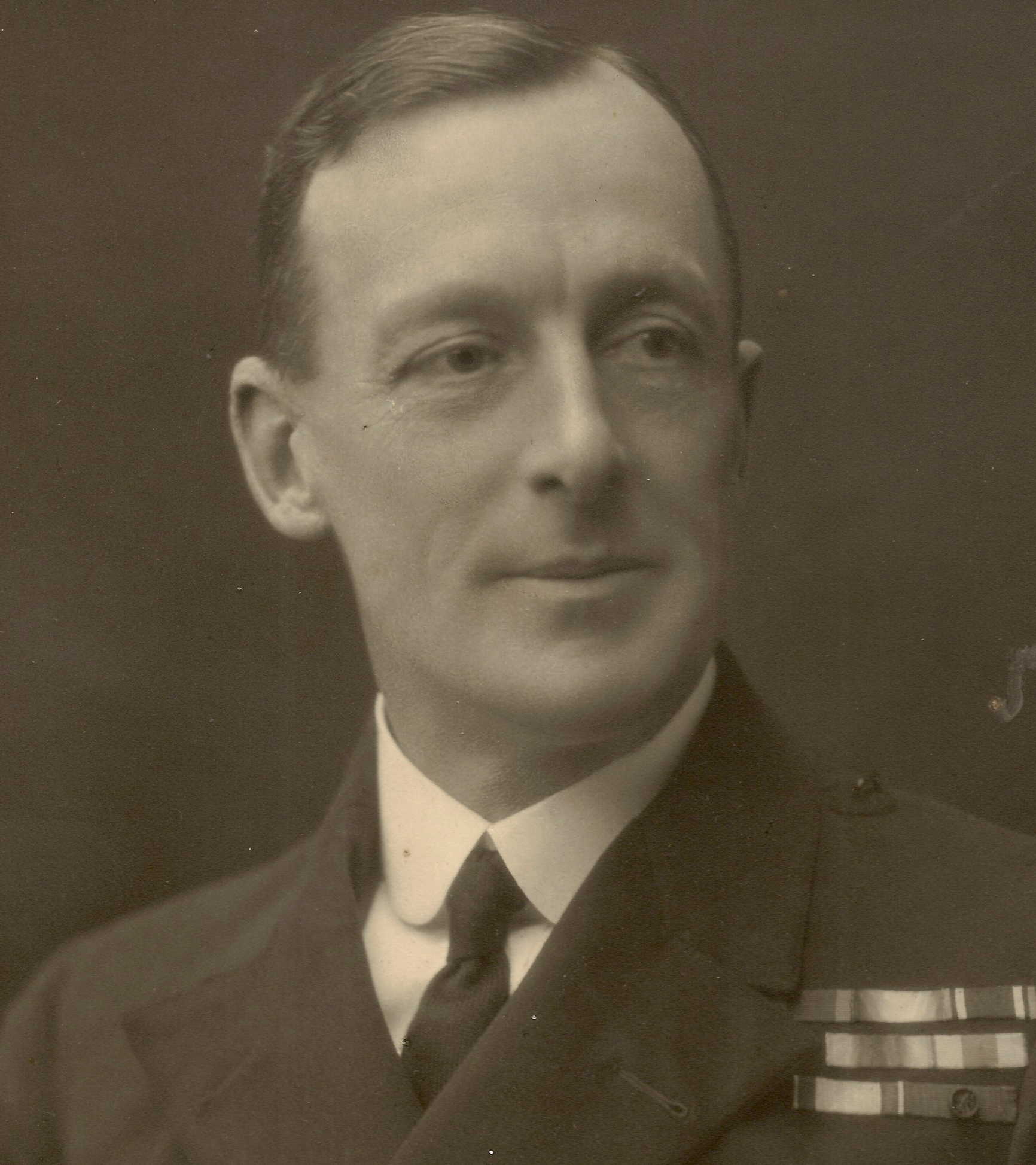
- Born: 10 January 1876
- Died: 7 March 1946 (aged 70)
- Relatives: Major General Francis Mitchell (son); Dame Mona Mitchell (granddaughter); Major Douglas Reynolds (cousin)
- Military career
- Allegiance: United Kingdom
- Branch: Royal Navy
- Service years: 1889–1933
- Rank: Admiral
- Commands: Malta Dockyard; 3rd Battle Squadron; HMS Ramillies; HMS Excellent; HMS Bellerophon; HMS Exmouth; HMS Eclipse
- Conflicts: First World War
- Awards: Companion of the Order of the Bath; Distinguished Service Order; Order of the Nile (Egypt); Legion of Honour (France)

Admiral Francis Herbert Mitchell, CB, DSO (10 January 1876 – 7 March 1946) was a Royal Navy officer who commanded the 3rd Battle Squadron and was President of the Dardanelles Committee in 1919.

== Naval career ==
Mitchell was the son of Colonel Herbert Leonard Mitchell and Mary Arabella Susan Reynolds, the grandnephew of Major General John William Reynolds, and the great-grandson of General Charles Reynolds. Mitchell joined the Royal Navy in 1889, and was appointed lieutenant for gunnery duties on the pre-dreadnought battleship HMS Mars on 10 May 1902.

Mitchell served in the First World War and, as commanding officer of the protected cruiser HMS Eclipse, saw action in the Dardanelles Campaign in 1915. He went on to be Naval Adviser to Commander-in-Chief Forces in Egypt in 1915, commanding officer of the training ship HMS Exmouth in 1916 and Chief of Staff to the Commander-in-Chief, Portsmouth in 1917. After that he became commanding officer of the battleship HMS Bellerophon in 1918, commanding officer of the gunnery school HMS Excellent in 1920 and commanding officer of the battleship HMS Ramillies in 1922. He was appointed a Companion of the Order of the Bath (CB) in the 1924 Birthday Honours.

Mitchell's final appointments were as commander of the 3rd Battle Squadron in 1926, and Admiral Superintendent of Malta Dockyard in 1928, before retiring in 1933.

== Mitchell Report ==
In between these commissions, the Admiralty created a committee of officers in early 1919 to identify and summarise important lessons learned from the First World War. Then Commodore Mitchell was appointed the President of this Dardanelles Committee, entrusted to investigate the Attacks Delivered on and the Enemy Defenses of the Dardanelles Straits. Submitted in October 1919, the "Mitchell Report" as it became known drew a number of conclusions that were of relevance to future amphibious landings, including those of D-Day.

== Personal life ==
Mitchell married Marion Russell in September 1901, daughter of Dr. Henry Russell. Their eldest son was Major General Francis Mitchell. Mitchell lost both his youngest son, Lieutenant Commander David Reynolds Mitchell, one week before the end of the Second World War in Europe (VE Day), and his brother, Major Charles Johnstone Mitchell, three weeks before the end of the First World War (Armistice Day). He was the first cousin of Major Douglas Reynolds, a Victoria Cross recipient, and the uncle of The Very Reverend Patrick Reynolds Mitchell. He died of pneumonia in 1946 at age 70.

Military offices
Preceded by Alexander Campbell	Admiral Superintendent, Malta Dockyard; 1928–1931	Succeeded by Matthew Best
