= F. W. D. Mitchell =

Australian civil servant and health writer

Frank William Drew Mitchell
- Born: 16 May 1845; Van Diemen's Land
- Died: 4 December 1936 (aged 91); Broughton, Hampshire

Frank William Drew Mitchell (16 May 1845 – 4 December 1936) I.S.O. was an Australian civil servant and health writer.

== Biography ==
Mitchell was born on 16 May 1845 in Tasmania to John and Catherine Mitchell. His father John Mitchell was a member of the Tasmanian House of Assembly. He grew up on a farm in Lisdillon, Australia. He was sent to England and was educated at Mannamead School in Plymouth.

Mitchell studied for five years as a doctor in Dublin but dropped out to complete civil service work and never took his final examinations. In the early twentieth century he occupied the post of Secretary of the Congested Districts Board for Ireland. He was the author of A Key to Health and Long Life (1914, second edition 1922). The thesis of the book is that indigestion is the cause of nearly all diseases which are not due to infection. Mitchell stated that a faulty diet was responsible for dyspepsia.

Mitchell aimed to show that most of the ills afflicting mankind are due to poisons manufactured in the body from bad food choices and he provided reasons for believing that much of this arises from gastric indigestion. He suggested that a simple life with the abandonment of many forms of luxury was essential for a healthy long life. Mitchell opposed the use of "salted or preserved foods" and favoured a diet rich in fresh fruit and salads.

Mitchell died on 4 December 1936 at his residence in Broughton, Hampshire.

== Selected publications ==
- The Land Regained: An Appeal to Justice (1884)
- A Key to Health and Long Life (1914, 1922)
