= Mona Mitchell =

British courtier

Dame Mona Ann Mitchell, DCVO (20 February 1938 – 17 December 2002) was a British courtier.

Born on 20 February 1938, she was the daughter of Major General Francis Neville Mitchell; her mother Ann Livingstone-Learmouth married, when widowed, Brigadier Richard Headlam Keenlyside.

Mitchell was secretary firstly to the jockey and racehorse trainer Fulke Walwyn, and then to the fashion designer Hardy Amies until she joined the Royal Household in 1968 as secretary to Princess Alexandra; she then served as her Private Secretary from 1974 until 1991.

For her service, she was appointed a Member (fourth class) of the Royal Victorian Order in 1976, a Commander in the 1985 New Year Honours, and finally a Dame Commander in the 1992 New Year Honours. She died on 17 December 2002.
