= Patrick Mitchell (priest) =

English Anglican priest (1930–2020)

Patrick Reynolds Mitchell KCVO (17 March 1930 – 23 January 2020) was an English Anglican priest.

== Life ==
Patrick Mitchell was born on 17 March 1930 and educated at Eton, Merton College, Oxford, and Wells Theological College. Ordained in 1955 he began his ecclesiastical career with a curacy at St. Mark's Church, Mansfield following which he was Priest-Vicar of Wells Cathedral.

Mitchell would go on to hold incumbencies in Milton, Portsmouth and Frome Selwood, Somerset before being appointed Dean of Wells in 1973, a position he held for 16 years; during his deanship he oversaw a major restoration of the cathedral. In 1981, he was appointed to the Cathedrals Advisory Commission for England. In 1989, he became Dean of Windsor until his retirement eight years later, when he was appointed a Knight Commander of the Royal Victorian Order (KCVO).

He died in January 2020 at the age of 89.

Church of England titles
Preceded by Irven David Edwards	Dean of Wells; 1973–1989	Succeeded by Richard Lewis
Preceded by Michael Ashley Mann	Dean of Windsor; 1989–1997	Succeeded by David Conner
