= HMS Lion (1847) =

Vanguard-class ship of the line of the Royal Navy

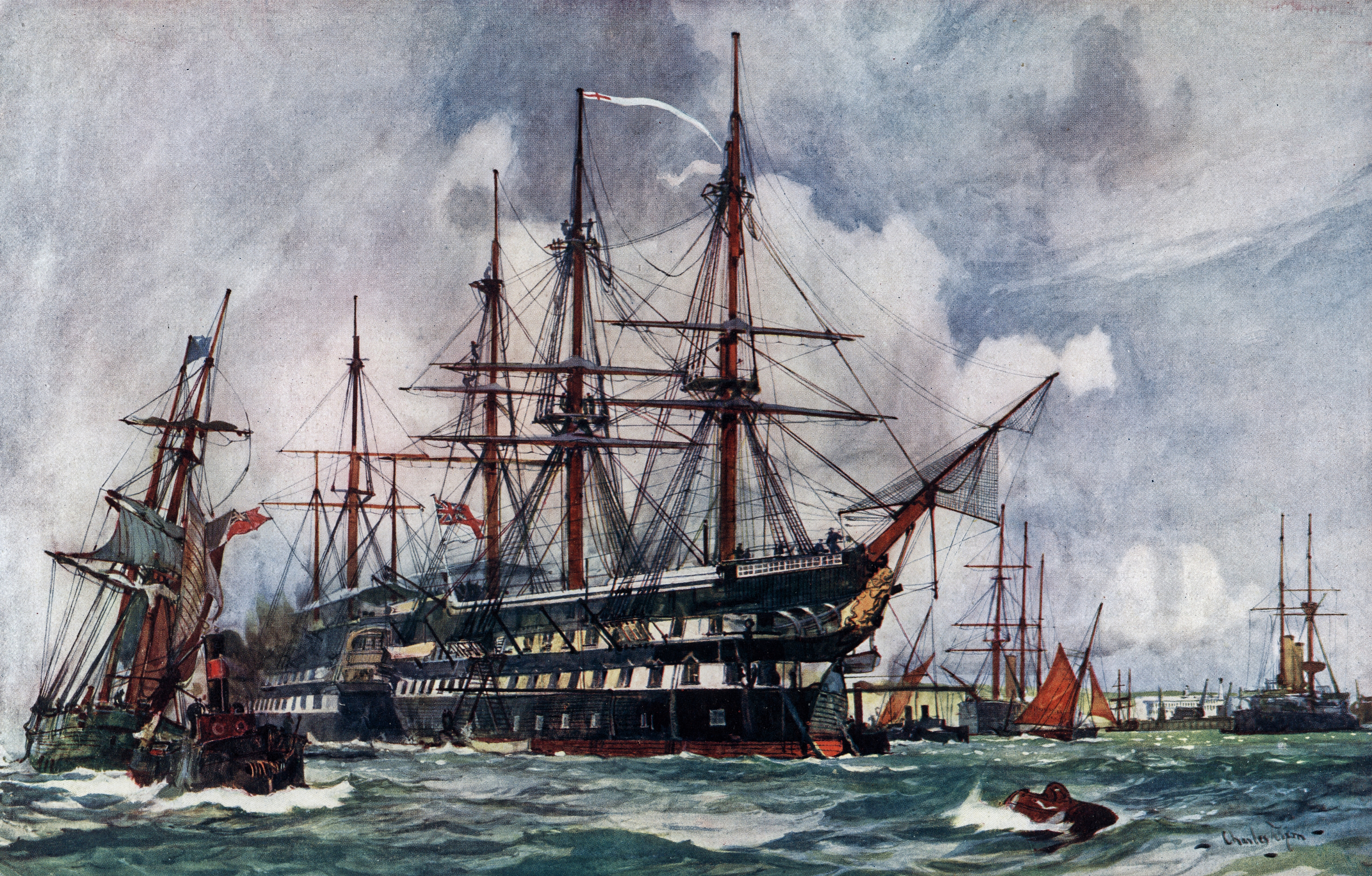
- Painting of Lion by Charles Dixon

History

United Kingdom
- Name: Lion
- Namesake: Lion
- Ordered: 12 March 1840
- Builder: HM Dockyard, Pembroke
- Laid down: July 1840
- Launched: 29 July 1847
- Completed: 26 September 1847
- Fate: Sold for scrap, 11 July 1905

General characteristics
- Class & type: 80-gun, second-rate Vanguard-class ship of the line
- Displacement: 3,482 long tons (3,538 t)
- Tons burthen: 2,589 63/94 (bm)
- Length: 190 ft (57.9 m) (gun deck)
- Beam: 57 ft (17.4 m)
- Draught: 25 ft 3 in (7.7 m)
- Depth of hold: 23 ft 4 in (7.1 m)
- Installed power: Boilers; 171 ihp (128 kW; 173 PS)
- Propulsion: 1 screw; single-expansion steam engine
- Sail plan: Full-rigged ship
- Speed: 10.9 kn (20.2 km/h; 12.5 mph)
- Complement: 750
- Armament: 80 muzzle-loading, smoothbore guns: Lower gun deck: 10 × 8 in (203 mm) shell guns + 18 × 32 pdr guns; Upper gun deck: 4 × 8 in shell guns + 24 × 32 pdr guns; Forecastle & Quarterdeck: 24 × 32 pdr guns

HMS Lion was an 80-gun Vanguard-class second-rate ship of the line built for the Royal Navy in the 1840s. Completed in 1847 and placed in ordinary, she was fitted with steam propulsion in 1858–1859, although the ship never served at sea. Lion served as a guard ship from 1864 to 1868 and was then converted to a receiving ship. In 1871 the ship was converted into a boys' training ship at HM Dockyard, Devonport. The ship was sold for scrap in 1905.

== Background and description ==
The Vanguard class was designed by the Surveyor of the Navy, William Symonds, with an emphasis on sailing qualities, rather than battle efficiency as they had a quick roll in poor weather that made them bad gun platforms. Lion measured 190 feet (57.9 m) at the gun deck and 155 feet 5 inches (47.4 m) at the keel. They had a beam of 57 feet (17.4 m), a depth of hold of 23 feet 4 inches (7.1 m) and a tonnage of 2,589 63/94 tons burthen. Their crews numbered 720 officers and ratings. The ships had the usual three-masted full-ship rig. Their muzzle-loading, smoothbore armament consisted of thirty 32-pounder (56 cwt) guns (Note: "Cwt" is the abbreviation for hundredweight, 56 cwt referring to the weight of the gun.) on the lower gun deck and twenty-eight 50 cwt, 32-pounder guns on the upper gun deck. Between their forecastle and quarterdeck, they carried twenty-two 42 cwt, 32-pounder guns.

=== Screw conversion ===
Based on the experiences gained during the Crimean War, Captain Baldwin Wake Walker, Surveyor of the Navy, favored converting first- and second-rate ships as they could accommodate the engines and their required coal better than smaller ships. However, the fine lines and size of Symonds' Vanguards as the smallest second rates dissuaded Walker from investing in full conversions of the ships. The arms race between France and Britain in screw-propelled ships of the line had resumed after the Crimean War ended in 1856 and Walker ordered Lion to be converted on 20 August of that year to match the anticipated numbers of French ships. The ship had a draught of 25 feet 3 inches (7.7 m), a displacement of 3,482 long tons (3,538 t), and her crew increased to 750 officers and ratings. Lion was fitted with a 400-nominal horsepower, trunk steam engine built by John Penn and Sons. Her boilers produced enough steam that the two-cylinder, horizontal engine produced 1,771 indicated horsepower (1,321 kW) which gave the ship a speed of 10.9 knots (20.2 km/h; 12.5 mph) during her sea trials off Plymouth on 18 June 1861, albeit without masts or stores. To reduce drag and improve performance under sail, the ship could hoist her propeller into the hull and retract the telescoping funnel.

The lower gun deck armament of the converted ships consisted of ten 8 in (203 mm) (65 cwt) shell guns and eighteen (56 cwt) 32-pounders. The upper gun deck had four 8-inch shell guns and twenty-four 32-pounders of 50 cwt. The combined armament of the forecastle and quarterdeck totalled twenty-four 42 cwt, 32-pounders.

== Construction and career ==
Lion, the sixteenth ship of that name to serve with the RN, was ordered from HM Dockyard, Pembroke, on 18 March 1840 and laid down the following July. She was launched on 29 July 1847 and completed on 26 September. The ship was not fitted out for sea and Lion was placed in ordinary.

The ship was ordered to be converted to screw propulsion on 20 August 1854 and work began on 1 February 1858. She was undocked on 17 May 1859 and completed for the 2nd Division of the Steam Ordinary. Lion was commissioned by Captain Arthur Farquhar on 7 September 1864 as the guard ship at Greenock. Captain John Montagu relieved Farquhar on 28 August 1865; the ship was briefly transferred to Londonderry (modern Derry) in 1867 and returned to Greenock later that year. She was paid off on 8 September 1868. Lion was recommissioned by Captain John Napier on 1 October to serve as a receiving ship at Devonport. The ship was converted into a boy's training ship there in 1871. Lion was sold for scrap on 11 July 1905.
