= HMS Collingwood (1841) =

Vanguard-class ship of the line

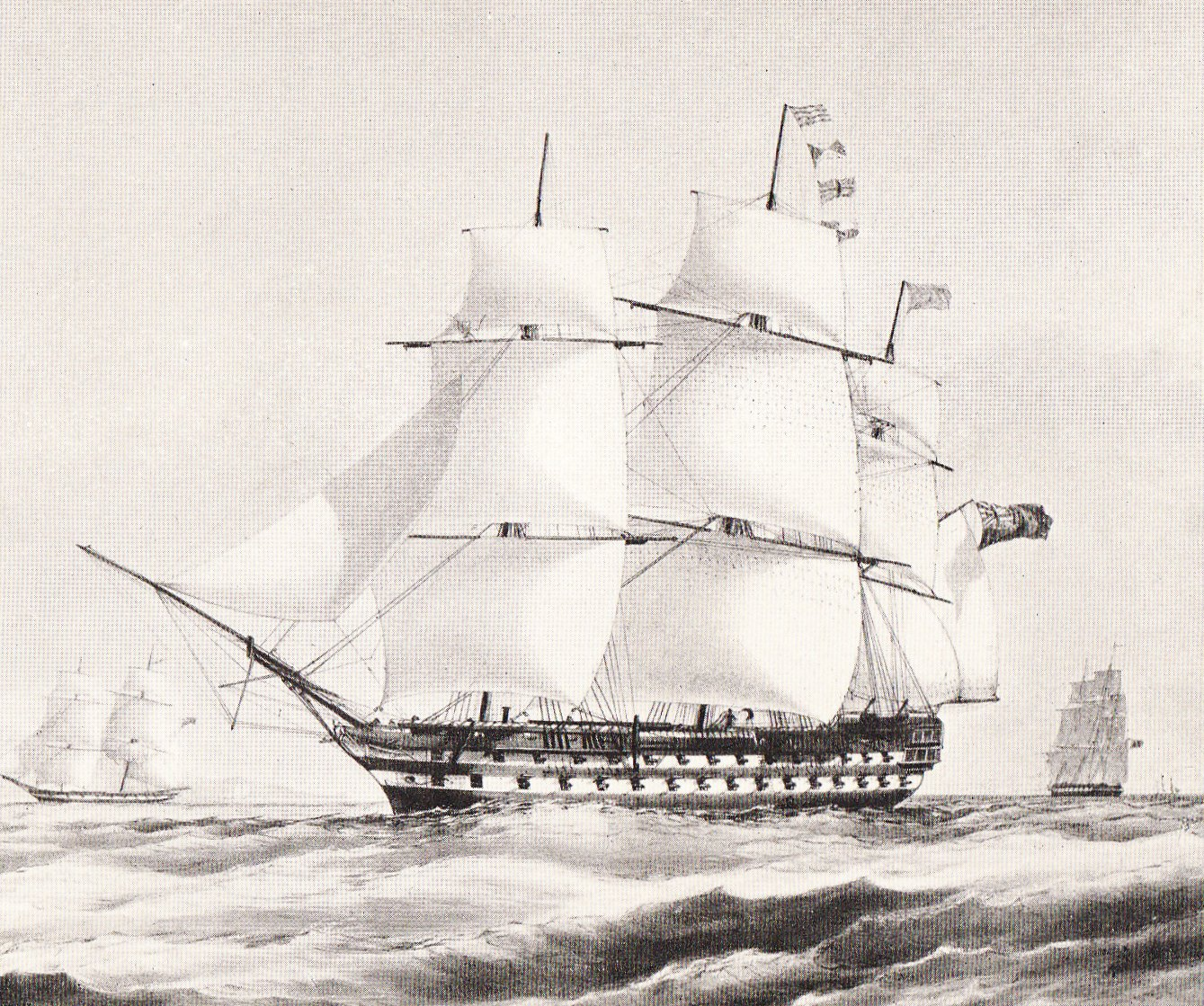
- A lithograph of Collingwood under sail

History

United Kingdom
- Name: Collingwood
- Namesake: Vice-Admiral Cuthbert Collingwood
- Ordered: 29 June 1832
- Builder: HM Dockyard, Pembroke
- Laid down: September 1835
- Launched: 17 August 1841
- Completed: 20 July 1844
- Commissioned: 8 May 1844
- Fate: Sold for scrap, 1867

General characteristics (as a steam ship)
- Class & type: 80-gun, second-rate, Vanguard-class ship of the line
- Displacement: 3,482 long tons (3,538 t)
- Tons burthen: 2,584 60/94 (bm)
- Length: 190 ft (57.9 m) (gun deck)
- Beam: 57 ft 2 in (17.4 m)
- Draught: 25 ft 3 in (7.7 m)
- Depth of hold: 23 ft 4 in (7.1 m)
- Installed power: Boilers; 1,424 ihp (1,062 kW; 1,444 PS)
- Propulsion: 1 screw; single-expansion steam engine
- Sail plan: Full-rigged ship
- Speed: 10.5 kn (19.4 km/h; 12.1 mph)
- Complement: 750
- Armament: 80 muzzle-loading, smoothbore guns: Lower gun deck: 10 × 8 in (203 mm) shell guns + 18 × 32 pdr guns; Upper gun deck: 4 × 8 in shell guns + 24 × 32 pdr guns; Forecastle & Quarterdeck: 24 × 32 pdr guns

HMS Collingwood was an 80-gun, second rate, Vanguard-class ship of the line built for the Royal Navy during the 1840s. Completed in 1844, she served as the flagship on the Pacific Station before returning home to be paid off in 1848. The ship remained in reserve for the rest of her career, even though she was converted to screw propulsion in 1860–1861. Collingwood was never fitted for sea after that and was sold for scrap in 1867.

== Background and description ==
The Vanguard class was designed by the Surveyor of the Navy, William Symonds, with an emphasis on sailing qualities, rather than battle efficiency as they had a quick roll in poor weather that made them bad gun platforms. Collingwood measured 190 feet (57.9 m) at the gun deck and 152 feet 8 inches (46.5 m) at the keel. She had a beam of 57 feet 2 inches (17.4 m), a depth of hold of 23 feet 4 inches (7.1 m), and a tonnage of 2,584 60/94 tons burthen. Their crews numbered 720 officers and ratings. The ships had the usual three-masted full-ship rig. Their muzzle-loading, smoothbore armament consisted of thirty 32-pounder (56 cwt) guns (Note: "Cwt" is the abbreviation for hundredweight, 56 cwt referring to the weight of the gun.) on the lower gun deck and twenty-eight 50 cwt, 32-pounder guns on the upper gun deck. Between their forecastle and quarterdeck, they carried twenty-two 42 cwt, 32-pounder guns.

=== Screw conversion ===
Based on the experiences gained during the Crimean War, Captain Baldwin Wake Walker, Surveyor of the Navy, favored converting first- and second-rate ships as they could accommodate the engines and their required coal better than smaller ships. However, the fine lines and size of Symonds' Vanguards as the smallest second rates dissuaded Walker from investing in full conversions of the ships. The arms race between France and Britain in screw-propelled ships of the line had resumed after the Crimean War ended in 1856 and Walker ordered Collingwood to be converted on 9 July 1859 to match the anticipated numbers of French ships. The ship had a draught of 25 feet 3 inches (7.7 m) and her crew increased to 750 officers and ratings. Collingwood was fitted with a 400-nominal horsepower, single-expansion steam engine built by J. & G. Rennie. Her boilers produced enough steam that the two-cylinder, horizontal engine produced 1,424 indicated horsepower (1,062 kW) which gave the ship a speed of 10.5 knots (19.4 km/h; 12.1 mph) during her sea trials in the Thames River on 26 January 1862, albeit without masts or stores. To reduce drag and improve performance under sail, the ship could hoist her propeller into the hull and retract the telescoping funnel.

The lower gun deck armament of the converted ships consisted of ten 8 in (203 mm) (65 cwt) shell guns and eighteen (56 cwt) 32-pounders. The upper gun deck had four 8-inch shell guns and twenty-four 32-pounders of 50 cwt. The combined armament of the forecastle and quarterdeck totalled twenty-four 42 cwt 32-pounders.

== Construction and career ==
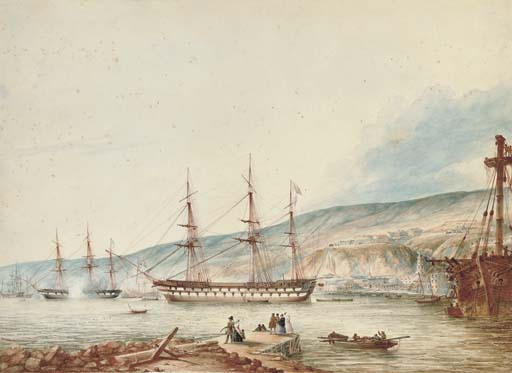
Collingwood in the bay of Valparaíso, 25 October 1847, at the moment of shifting the flag of Rear-Admiral Sir George Seymour from white to the red with the frigate Carysfort, in attendance and saluting

Named for Vice-Admiral Cuthbert Collingwood, Collingwood was the first ship of her name to serve with the RN. The ship was ordered from HM Dockyard, Pembroke, on 29 June 1832 and was laid down in September 1835. Construction was slowed by the need to modify her hull in accordance with Symonds' changes to the ship's design and to reduce the rake of her stern. Collingwood was launched on 17 August 1841 and was completed on 20 July 1844 after her poop deck was extended to accommodate an admiral. The ship was commissioned by Captain Henry Broadhead on 8 May; he was relieved by Captain Robert Smart on 13 August and she became the flagship of Rear-Admiral Sir George Seymour, commander-in-chief of the Pacific Station. Collingwood returned home and was paid off on 20 July 1848. The ship was refitted as an "Advanced ship" at HM Dockyard, Portsmouth, between August 1848 and February 1849 so she could be activated more quickly, which meant that all of her guns were aboard and more of her masts were fitted; the rest of her rigging and stores were in a designated warehouse.

The conversion of Collingwood to screw propulsion was ordered on 9 July 1859 and work began on 23 March 1860. The ship was undocked on 13 July 1861, but she was never fitted for sea and remained in ordinary. Collingwood was sold to Henry Castle & Sons for scrap in March 1867 and was subsequently broken up at their facility in Charlton, London.
