= HMS Meeanee =

Vanguard-class ship of the line

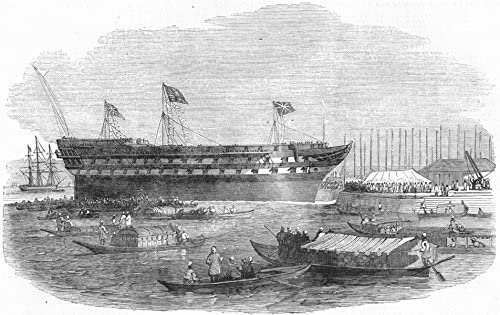
- Launch of the Meanee, 80 guns, at Bombay (modern Mumbai)

History

United Kingdom
- Name: Meeanee
- Namesake: Battle of Miani
- Ordered: 12 March 1839
- Builder: Bombay Dockyard
- Laid down: April 1842
- Launched: 11 November 1848
- Completed: 4 April 1849
- Commissioned: 18 November 1862
- Decommissioned: 1 March 1866
- Fate: Sold for scrap, 1906

General characteristics (as a steamship)
- Class & type: 80-gun, second-rate, Vanguard-class ship of the line
- Displacement: 3,482 long tons (3,538 t)
- Tons burthen: 2,591 14/94 (bm)
- Length: 190 ft 2 in (58 m) (gun deck)
- Beam: 56 ft 11 in (17.3 m)
- Draught: 25 ft 3 in (7.7 m)
- Depth of hold: 23 ft 4 in (7.1 m)
- Installed power: Boilers; 1,384 ihp (1,032 kW; 1,403 PS)
- Propulsion: 1 screw; trunk steam engine
- Sail plan: Full-rigged ship
- Speed: 10.4 kn (19.3 km/h; 12.0 mph)
- Complement: 750
- Armament: 80 muzzle-loading, smoothbore guns: Lower gun deck: 10 × 8 in (203 mm) shell guns + 18 × 32 pdr guns; Upper gun deck: 4 × 8 in shell guns + 24 × 32 pdr guns; Forecastle & Quarterdeck: 24 × 32 pdr guns

HMS Meeanee was a 80-gun, second-rate, Vanguard-class ship of the line built for the Royal Navy during the 1840s. She was placed in ordinary upon her completion in 1848. The ship was converted to screw propulsion in 1856–1857, but was not commissioned until 1862 when she was assigned to the Mediterranean Fleet. Meeanee was converted into a hospital ship for the War Department in 1867–1868 and was towed to Hong Kong the latter year. The ship was sold for scrap in 1906.

== Background and description ==
The Vanguard class was designed by the Surveyor of the Navy, William Symonds, with an emphasis on sailing qualities, rather than battle efficiency as they had a quick roll in poor weather that made them bad gun platforms. Meeanee measured 190 feet 2 inches (58 m) at the gun deck and 154 feet 5 inches (47.1 m) at the keel. She had a beam of 56 feet 11 inches (17.3 m), a depth of hold of 23 feet 4 inches (7.1 m), and had a tonnage of 2,591 14/94 tons burthen. Their crews numbered 720 officers and ratings. The ships had the usual three-masted full-ship rig. Their muzzle-loading, smoothbore armament consisted of thirty 32-pounder (56 cwt) guns (Note: "Cwt" is the abbreviation for hundredweight, 56 cwt referring to the weight of the gun.) on the lower gun deck and twenty-eight 50 cwt, 32-pounder guns on the upper gun deck. Between their forecastle and quarterdeck, they carried twenty-two 42 cwt, 32-pounder guns.

=== Screw conversion ===
Based on the experiences gained during the Crimean War, Captain Baldwin Wake Walker, Surveyor of the Navy, favored converting first- and second-rate ships as they could accommodate the engines and their required coal better than smaller ships. However, the fine lines and size of Symonds' Vanguards as the smallest second rates dissuaded Walker from investing in full conversions of the ships. The arms race between France and Britain in screw-propelled ships of the line had resumed after the Crimean War ended in 1856 and Walker ordered Meeanee to be converted on 26 November of that year to match the anticipated numbers of French ships. The ship had a draught of 25 feet 3 inches (7.7 m), a displacement of 3,482 long tons (3,538 t), and her crew increased to 750 officers and ratings. Meeanee was fitted with a 400-nominal horsepower, trunk steam engine built by John Penn and Sons that drove a single propeller. Her boilers produced enough steam that the two-cylinder, horizontal engine produced 1,384 indicated horsepower (1,032 kW) which gave the ship a speed of 10.4 knots (19.3 km/h; 12.0 mph) during her sea trials on 17 February 1858. To reduce drag and improve performance under sail, the ship could hoist her propeller into the hull and retract the telescoping funnel.

== Construction and career ==
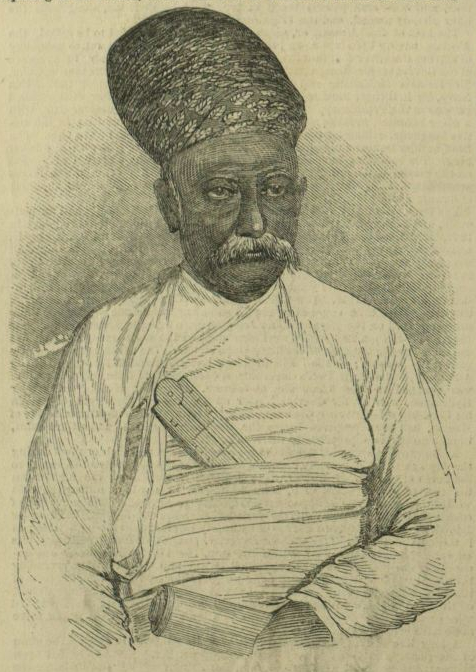
Cursetjee Rustomjee, the head builder at the H.E.I. company's dock and shipbuilding yard at Bombay from 1844

Named after the Battle of Meeanee, Meeanee was the first ship of her name to serve with the RN. The ship was ordered on 12 March 1839 under the name of Madras, although the order was probably not placed with the East India Company's Bombay Dockyard until 16 September 1841. She was laid down in April 1842 and was renamed Meeanee on 19 January 1846, by order of the new First Lord of the Admiralty, Edward Law, 1st Earl of Ellenborough, a former Governor-General of India. The ship was launched on 11 November 1848, under the supervision of the dock's head builder, Cursetjee Rustomjee. Construction was prolonged by infestations of termites. Meanee retained the figurehead of a native of Madras (modern Chennai), though it was no longer appropriate. The ship was completed on 4 April 1849 and sailed for Britain under the command of Commander Edward Inglefield, laden with Persian artefacts for the British Museum. Meeanee arrived on 1 August and was immediately laid up in ordinary.

The ship's conversion to screw propulsion was ordered on 20 August 1856 from HM Dockyard, Chatham, but the work was transferred to Sheerness Dockyard and begun on 6 December. She was undocked on 31 October 1857 and completed in September 1858, still in ordinary. Captain George Wodehouse commissioned Meeanee on 18 November 1862 for service with the Mediterranean Fleet. She returned home and was paid off on 1 March 1866.

On 5 March 1867 the ship was lent to the War Department as hospital ship in Hong Kong. Meeanee was towed to her destination from 30 March 1868 to her arrival on 28 October. She was towed by HMS Adventure from Java Head to Hong Kong from August. In 1870 she was moored in the centre of Hong Kong Harbour servicing British Army personnel. The ship sold for scrap in 1906.
