= HMS Colossus (1848) =

1848 Vanguard-class ship of the line of the Royal Navy

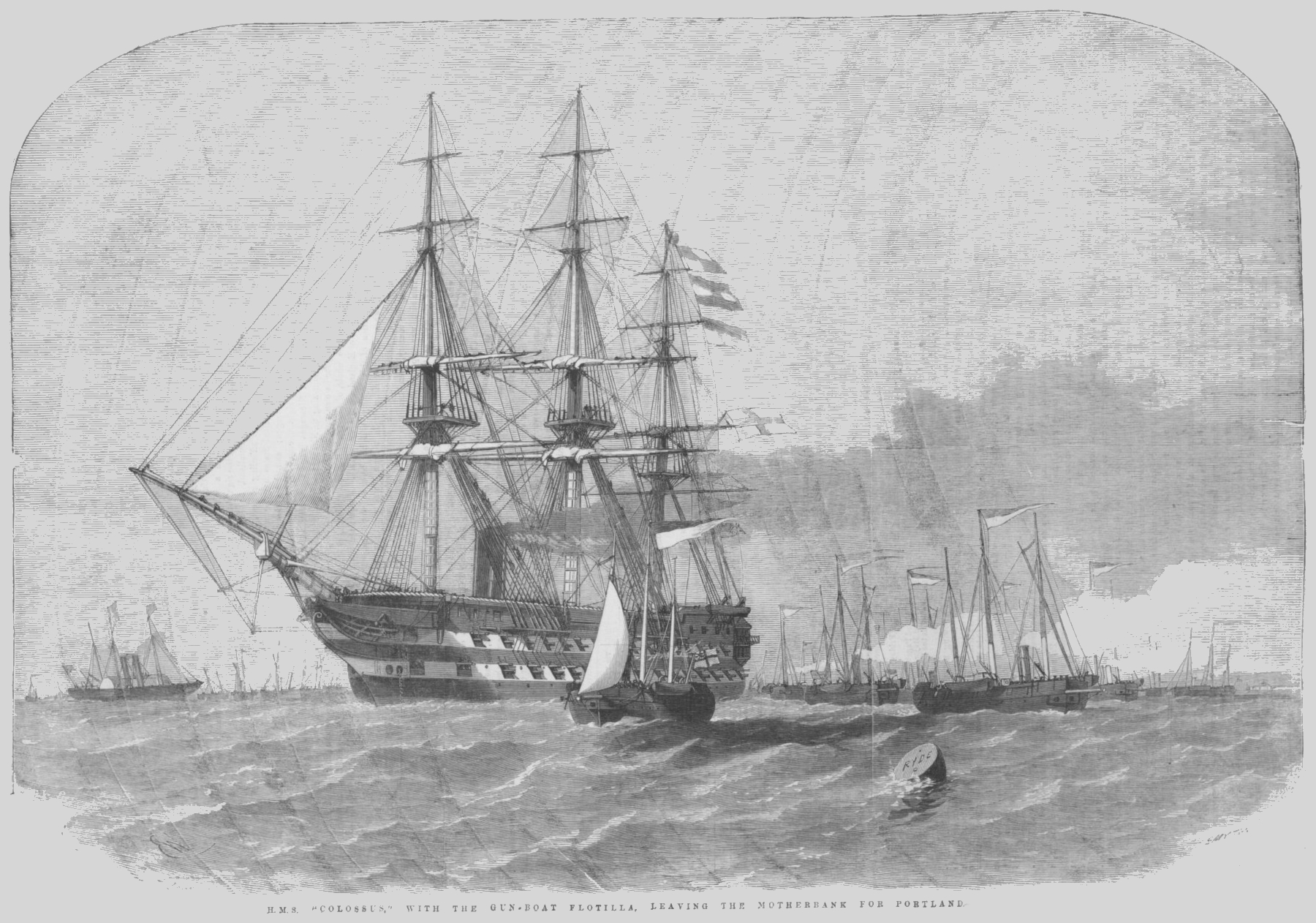
- Colossus, with the Gun-Boat Flotilla, leaving the Motherbank for Portland

History

United Kingdom
- Name: Colossus
- Namesake: Colossus of Rhodes
- Ordered: 18 March 1839
- Builder: HM Dockyard, Pembroke
- Laid down: October 1843
- Launched: 1 June 1848
- Completed: 3 July 1848
- Commissioned: 15 June 1854
- Fate: Sold for scrap, March 1867

General characteristics (as converted)
- Class & type: Vanguard-class ship of the line
- Displacement: 3,482 long tons (3,538 t)
- Tons burthen: 2,589 63/94 bm
- Length: 190 ft (57.9 m) (gun deck)
- Beam: 57 ft 1 in (17.4 m)
- Draught: 25 ft 3 in (7.7 m)
- Depth of hold: 23 ft 4 in (7.1 m)
- Installed power: Boilers; 1,458 ihp (1,087 kW; 1,478 PS)
- Propulsion: 1 screw; single-expansion steam engine
- Sail plan: Full-rigged ship
- Speed: 9.3 kn (17.2 km/h; 10.7 mph)
- Complement: 750
- Armament: 80 muzzle-loading, smoothbore guns: Lower gun deck: 10 × 8 in (203 mm) shell guns + 18 × 32 pdr guns; Upper gun deck: 4 × 8 in shell guns + 24 × 32 pdr guns; Forecastle & Quarterdeck: 24 × 32 pdr guns

HMS Colossus was an 80-gun, second-rate, Vanguard-class ship of the line built for the Royal Navy in the 1840s. Completed in 1848, she was immediately placed in ordinary. The ship was fitted with screw propulsion in 1854, and was briefly assigned to the North America and West Indies Station before she returned home in early 1855. Colossus was then assigned to the Baltic Fleet and played a minor role there during the ongoing Crimean War of 1854–1856 against the Russian Empire. The ship was paid off in 1857 and became a guard ship in 1860. She was replaced in 1864 and was sold for scrap in 1867.

== Background and description ==
The Vanguard class was designed by the Surveyor of the Navy, William Symonds, with an emphasis on sailing qualities, rather than battle efficiency as they had a quick roll in poor weather that made them bad gun platforms. Colossus measured 190 feet (57.9 m) at the gun deck and 153 feet 5 inches (46.8 m) at the keel. She had a beam of 57 feet (17.4 m), a depth of hold of 23 feet 4 inches (7.1 m), and a tonnage of 2,589 61/94 tons burthen. Their crews numbered 720 officers and ratings. The ships had the usual three-masted full-ship rig. Their muzzle-loading, smoothbore armament consisted of thirty 32-pounder (56 cwt) guns (Note: "Cwt" is the abbreviation for hundredweight, 56 cwt referring to the weight of the gun.) on the lower gun deck and twenty-eight 50 cwt, 32-pounder guns on the upper gun deck. Between their forecastle and quarterdeck, they carried twenty-two 42 cwt, 32-pounder guns.

=== Screw conversion ===
Completion of the French fast steam-powered, second-rate Napoléon in early 1852 and the French preparations for building more like her caused an invasion scare that prompted the First Derby ministry to authorize a large programme of steam-powered ships of the line to maintain British naval superiority; thus initiating a naval arms race between France and Britain. Captain Baldwin Wake Walker, the Surveyor of the Navy, ordered Colossus converted to screw propulsion in early 1854 to match the anticipated numbers of French ships. The ship had a draught of 25 feet 3 inches (7.7 m), a displacement of 3,482 long tons (3,538 t), and her crew increased to 750 officers and ratings. Colossus was fitted with a 400-nominal horsepower, trunk steam engine, built by John Penn and Sons, that drove a single propeller. Using steam provided by the ship's boilers, the two-cylinder, horizontal engine produced 1,458 indicated horsepower (1,087 kW) which gave the ship a speed of 9.3 knots (17.2 km/h; 10.7 mph) during her sea trials in Stokes Bay on 16 October 1854. To reduce drag and improve performance under sail, the ship could hoist her propeller into the hull and retract the telescoping funnel.

The lower gun deck armament of the converted ships consisted of ten 8 in (203 mm) (65 cwt) shell guns and eighteen (56 cwt) 32-pounders. The upper gun deck had four 8-inch shell guns and twenty-four 32-pounders of 50 cwt. The combined armament of the forecastle and quarterdeck totalled twenty-four 42 cwt 32-pounders.

== Construction and career ==
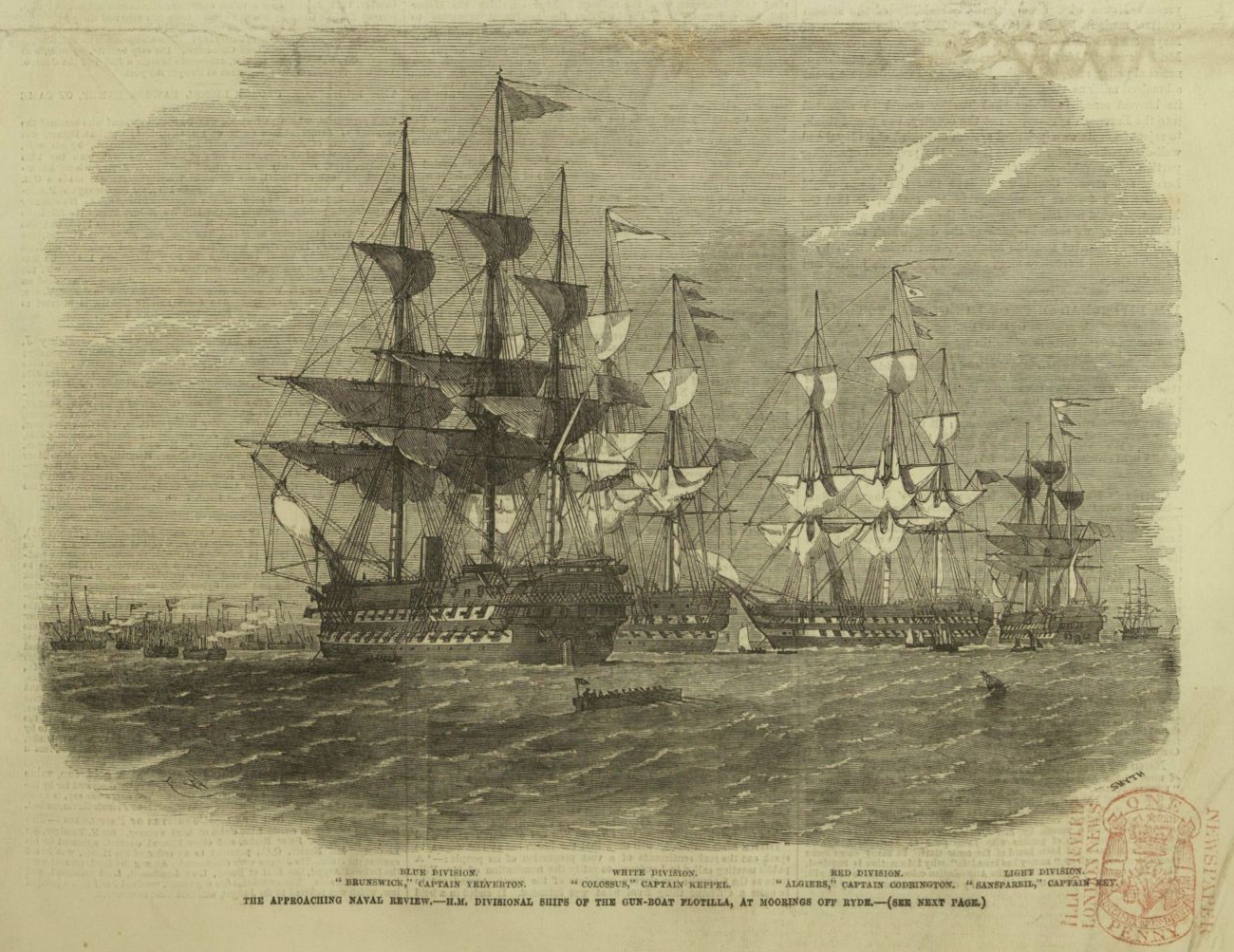
HM Divisional Ships of the Gun-Boat Flotilla, at moorings off Ryde, 1856. Colossus (second left), Captain Keppel

Named after the Colossus of Rhodes, Colossus was the third ship of her name to serve in the RN. She was ordered from HM Dockyard, Pembroke on 18 March 1839 and laid down in October 1843. She was launched on 1 June 1848 and completed on 3 July. The ship was not fitted out for sea and Colossus was placed in ordinary.

Her conversion to screw power was ordered on 9 January 1854 at HM Dockyard, Portsmouth, and work began on 26 January. The ship was undocked on 11 June and was commissioned by Captain Robert Spencer Robinson four days later. Colossus was completed for sea around September–October and assigned to the North American and West Indies Station. She returned to Britain in early 1855 and was assigned to the Baltic Fleet. She departed for the Baltic with the main body of the fleet on 4 April. Little is known of her activities during the campaign, other than the ship did not participate in the Bombardment of Sveaborg in August. Colossus was assigned to observe the Russian anchorage at Kronstadt Fortress in late August. On 2 September, the 74-gun, Russian ship of the line Vyborg, a screw frigate and several gunboats sortied from Kronstadt, but turned back to port when Colossus and the screw frigate Imperieuse gave chase. Colossus was ordered back to Britain on 28 November. Captain Henry Keppel assumed command in early 1856 when the ship was tasked to command a division of gunboats for the forthcoming campaign season. The Treaty of Paris was signed in March, ending the war before the ship and her gunboats reached the Baltic.

Colossus was paid off on 2 June 1857 and was overhauled for the steam reserve at HM Dockyard, Chatham, from December to March 1858. She was outfitted for the 1st class reserve at Sheerness Dockyard in May 1859. The ship was fitted for sea at Portsmouth in June 1860 and was recommissioned by Captain Francis Scott on 11 June to serve as the guard ship at Portland Harbour. Captain George Patey relieved Scott on 1 April 1861 and was relieved in his turn by Captain Swynfen Carnegie on 6 May 1862. Captain Edward Codd assumed command of the ship on 13 April 1863. The second-rate Frederick William replaced Colossus on 1 July 1864 and the officers and crew were transferred to the new ship. Colossus was sold to Castle & Beech for scrap in March 1867 and subsequently broken up at their facility in Charlton, London.
