= HMS Mars (1848) =

Vanguard-class ship of the line of the British Royal Navy, launched on 1 July 1848

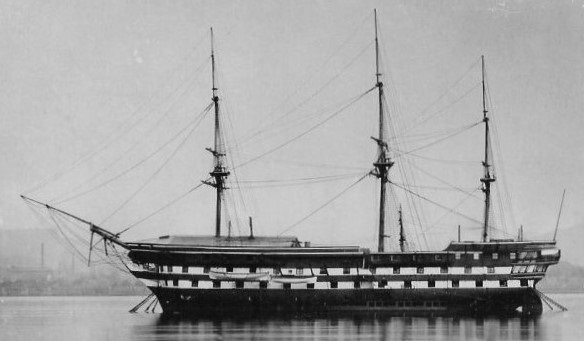
- Mars as a training ship on River Tay, circa 1902

History

United Kingdom
- Name: Mars
- Ordered: 18 March 1839
- Builder: Chatham Dockyard
- Laid down: December 1839
- Launched: 1 July 1848
- Completed: 30 August 1848
- Commissioned: 20 June 1859
- Decommissioned: 7 February 1863
- Reclassified: As a boys training ship, 13 May 1869
- Fate: Sold for scrap, 10 June 1929

General characteristics (as a steam ship)
- Class & type: 80-gun, second-rate, Vanguard-class ship of the line
- Displacement: 3,482 long tons (3,538 t)
- Tons burthen: 2,573 63/94 (bm)
- Length: 190 ft (57.9 m) (gun deck)
- Beam: 56 ft 9 in (17.3 m)
- Draught: 25 ft 3 in (7.7 m)
- Depth of hold: 23 ft 4 in (7.1 m)
- Installed power: Boilers
- Propulsion: 1 screw; single-expansion steam engine
- Sail plan: Full-rigged ship
- Complement: 750
- Armament: 80 muzzle-loading, smoothbore guns: Lower gun deck: 10 × 8 in (203 mm) shell guns + 18 × 32 pdr guns; Upper gun deck: 4 × 8 in shell guns + 24 × 32 pdr guns; Forecastle & Quarterdeck: 24 × 32 pdr guns

HMS Mars was a 80-gun, second rate, Vanguard-class ship of the line built for the Royal Navy (RN) during the 1840s. Completed in 1848, the ship was immediately placed in ordinary. She was converted to screw propulsion in 1855–1856, during the Crimean War of 1854–1856 against the Russian Empire and remained in ordinary until she was commissioned in 1859 for service with the Channel Squadron and the Mediterranean Fleet. She returned home in 1863 to be paid off. Mars was loaned to the City of Dundee to serve as a boys training ship in 1869 and continued in that role until she was sold for scrap in 1929 and subsequently broken up.

== Background and description ==
The Vanguard class was designed by the Surveyor of the Navy, William Symonds, with an emphasis on sailing qualities, rather than battle efficiency as they had a quick roll in poor weather that made them bad gun platforms. Mars measured 190 feet (57.9 m) at the gun deck and 154 feet (46.9 m) at the keel. She had a beam of 56 feet 9 inches (17.3 m), a depth of hold of 23 feet 4 inches (7.1 m), and a tonnage of 2,573 63/94 tons burthen. Their crews numbered 720 officers and ratings. The ships had the usual three-masted full-ship rig. Their muzzle-loading, smoothbore armament consisted of thirty 32-pounder (56 cwt) guns (Note: "Cwt" is the abbreviation for hundredweight, 56 cwt referring to the weight of the gun.) on the lower gun deck and twenty-eight 50 cwt, 32-pounder guns on the upper gun deck. Between their forecastle and quarterdeck, they carried twenty-two 42 cwt, 32-pounder guns.

=== Screw conversion ===
Based on the experiences gained during the Crimean War, Captain Baldwin Wake Walker, Surveyor of the Navy, favored converting first- and second-rate ships as they could accommodate the engines and their required coal better than smaller ships. However, the fine lines and size of Symonds' Vanguards as the smallest second rates dissuaded Walker from investing in full conversions of the ships. The arms race between France and Britain in screw-propelled ships of the line had continued during the Crimean War and Walker ordered Mars to be converted on 10 August 1854 to match the anticipated numbers of French ships. The ship had a draught of 25 feet 3 inches (7.7 m), a displacement of 3,482 long tons (3,538 t), and her crew increased to 750 officers and ratings. Mars was fitted with a 400-nominal horsepower, single-expansion steam engine built by Maudslay, Sons and Field that drove a single propeller. Using steam provided by the ship's boilers, the two-cylinder, horizontal engine drove a single propeller. No records survive of the ship's sea trials. To reduce drag and improve performance under sail, the ship could hoist her propeller into the hull and retract the telescoping funnel.

The lower gun deck armament of the converted ships consisted of ten 8 in (203 mm) (65 cwt) shell guns and eighteen (56 cwt) 32-pounders. The upper gun deck had four 8-inch shell guns and twenty-four 32-pounders of 50 cwt. The combined armament of the forecastle and quarterdeck totalled twenty-four 42 cwt 32-pounders.

== Construction and career ==
Named for the Roman God of War, Mars was the sixth ship of her name to serve with the RN. The ship was ordered from HM Dockyard, Chatham, on 18 March 1839 and was laid down in December of that year. She was launched on 1 July 1848 and was completed on 30 August and immediately placed in ordinary.

Conversion of the ship to screw propulsion was ordered on 10 August 1854 and work began on 7 March 1855. Mars was undocked on 23 November 1855 and completed on 20 June 1856. The ship outfitted for the 2nd Class Steam Reserve from June to October 1858. Captain James Strange commissioned the ship on 20 June 1859, and she was fitted for sea at Sheerness Dockyard between July and September. Mars was assigned to the Channel Squadron when her fitting out was completed. The ship was transferred to the Mediterranean Fleet in October 1860 and returned home to be paid off at Sheerness on 7 February 1863.

On 13 May 1869 Mars was loaned to the City of Dundee so she might serve as a boys training ship. The ship arrived at the mouth of the River Tay on 17 August, towed by the gunboat Medusa and anchored off Woodhaven. Here she served as a training ship for boys aged ten to sixteen from across Scotland, with up to 400 on board at any one time; these boys were usually homeless, orphans, or delinquents. She was finally sold for scrap on 10 June 1929, and towed to Thos. W. Ward's Inverkeithing yard to be broken up.
