= HMS Irresistible (1859) =

Ship of the line of the Royal Navy

History

United Kingdom
- Name: Irresistible
- Ordered: 12 March 1840
- Builder: Chatham Dockyard
- Laid down: 1 January 1849
- Launched: 27 October 1859
- Commissioned: 1 April 1864
- Out of service: 1890
- Reclassified: As a depot ship, September 1868
- Fate: Sold for scrap, 1894

General characteristics (as completed)
- Class & type: 80-gun Vanguard-class ship of the line
- Tons burthen: 2,642 (bm)
- Length: 190 ft (57.9 m) (gun deck)
- Beam: 56 ft 9 in (17.3 m)
- Draught: 25 ft 3 in (7.7 m)
- Depth of hold: 23 ft 4 in (7.1 m)
- Installed power: Boilers; 1,461 ihp (1,089 kW; 1,481 PS)
- Propulsion: 1 screw; trunk steam engine
- Sail plan: Full-rigged ship
- Speed: 8.6 kn (15.9 km/h; 9.9 mph)
- Complement: 750
- Armament: 80 muzzle-loading, smoothbore guns: Lower gun deck: 10 × 8 in (203 mm) shell guns + 18 × 32 pdr guns; Upper gun deck: 4 × 8 in shell guns + 24 × 32 pdr guns; Forecastle & Quarterdeck: 24 × 32 pdr guns

HMS Irresistible was an 80-gun, second-rate Vanguard-class ship of the line, built for the Royal Navy (RN) during the 1850s. She was converted to screw propulsion while still under construction, which made her a part of the Majestic subclass. Completed in 1860, the ship was in ordinary until 1864 when she became a guard ship. Irresistible served as a depot ship in Bermuda from 1868 to 1890. She was sold for scrap four years later.

== Background and description ==
The Vanguard class was designed by the Surveyor of the Navy, William Symonds, with an emphasis on sailing qualities, rather than battle efficiency as they had a quick roll in poor weather that made them bad gun platforms. The ship was intended to measure 190 feet (57.9 m) at the gun deck and 155 feet 3 inches (47.3 m) at the keel. Irresistible would have had a beam of 56 feet 9 inches (17.3 m), a depth of hold of 23 feet 4 inches (7.1 m) and had a tonnage of 2,589 81/94 tons burthen. Her crew would have numbered 720 officers and ratings. The ship had the usual three-masted full-ship rig. Her muzzle-loading, smoothbore armament was intended to consist of thirty 32-pounder (56 cwt) guns (Note: "Cwt" is the abbreviation for hundredweight, 56 cwt referring to the weight of the gun.) on the lower gun deck and twenty-eight 50 cwt, 32-pounder guns on the upper gun deck. Between her forecastle and quarterdeck, she would have carried twenty-two 32-pounder (42 cwt) guns.

=== Conversion ===
Still under construction, Captain Baldwin Wake Walker, the new Surveyor of the Navy, ordered the conversion of Irresistible and four of her sister ships into screw-propelled ships of the line in 1854. To save time, they were not modified to improve their performance under steam and followed the plan of Majestic. Walker disliked the ships designed by Symonds and believed that they were inferior to more conventional designs; he intended for them to face the Russian sailing fleet while the superior ships would be better suited to counter the growing threat of the French Navy. Irresistible displaced 3,482 long tons (3,538 t) and she had a draught of 25 feet 3 inches (7.7 m). Her tonnage increased to 2,642 tons burthen, her length at the keel to 158 feet 4 inches (48.3 m) and her crew to 750 officers and ratings. The ship was fitted with a 400-nominal horsepower, trunk steam engine, built by John Penn and Sons, that drove a single propeller. Her boilers produced enough steam that the two-cylinder, horizontal engine produced 1,461 indicated horsepower (1,089 kW) which gave the ship a speed of 8.6 knots (15.9 km/h; 9.9 mph) during her sea trials. To reduce drag and improve performance under sail, the ship could hoist her propeller into the hull and retract the telescoping funnel.

The lower gun deck armament of the converted ships consisted of ten 8 in (203 mm) (65 cwt) shell guns and eighteen (56 cwt) 32-pounders. The upper gun deck had four 8-inch shell guns and twenty-four 32-pounders of 50 cwt. The combined armament of the forecastle and quarterdeck totalled twenty-four 42 cwt 32-pounders.

== Construction and career ==
Irresistible was the second ship of her name to serve in the RN. Ordered on 12 March 1840, the ship was laid down at Chatham Dockyard on 1 January 1849, but was reordered as a screw-propelled ship on 23 June 1854. Work began on 1 May 1855 and she was launched on 27 October 1859. Irrestible was completed at Sheerness Dockyard in January 1860 and immediately placed in ordinary. The ship was commissioned by Captain John Dickson on 1 April 1864 to serve as a guard ship at Southampton. Dickson was relieved by Captain John Borlase on 17 May 1865. She participated in the fleet review conducted at Spithead in July 1867. Irresistible was paid off on 30 April 1868 at Portsmouth. Commander Arthur Roe recommissioned the ship on 5 June to sail to Bermuda and she was paid off on 30 September. The ship became a depot ship there that same month. Irresistible was taken out of service in 1890 and sold for scrap in 1894.

== Bibliography ==
- Colledge, J. J.; Warlow, Ben & Bush, Steve (2020). Ships of the Royal Navy: The Complete Record of all Fighting Ships of the Royal Navy from the 15th Century to the Present (5th revised and updated ed.). Seaforth Publishing. ISBN 978-1-5267-9327-0.
- Lambert, Andrew D. (1984). Battleships in Transition: The Creation of the Steam Battlefleet 1815-1860. Conway Maritime Press. ISBN 0-85177-315-X.
- Winfield, Rif (2014). British Warships in the Age of Sail 1817–1863: Design, Construction, Careers and Fates. Seaforth Publishing. ISBN 978-1-84832-169-4.
