= HMS Centurion (1844) =

Vanguard-class ship of the line

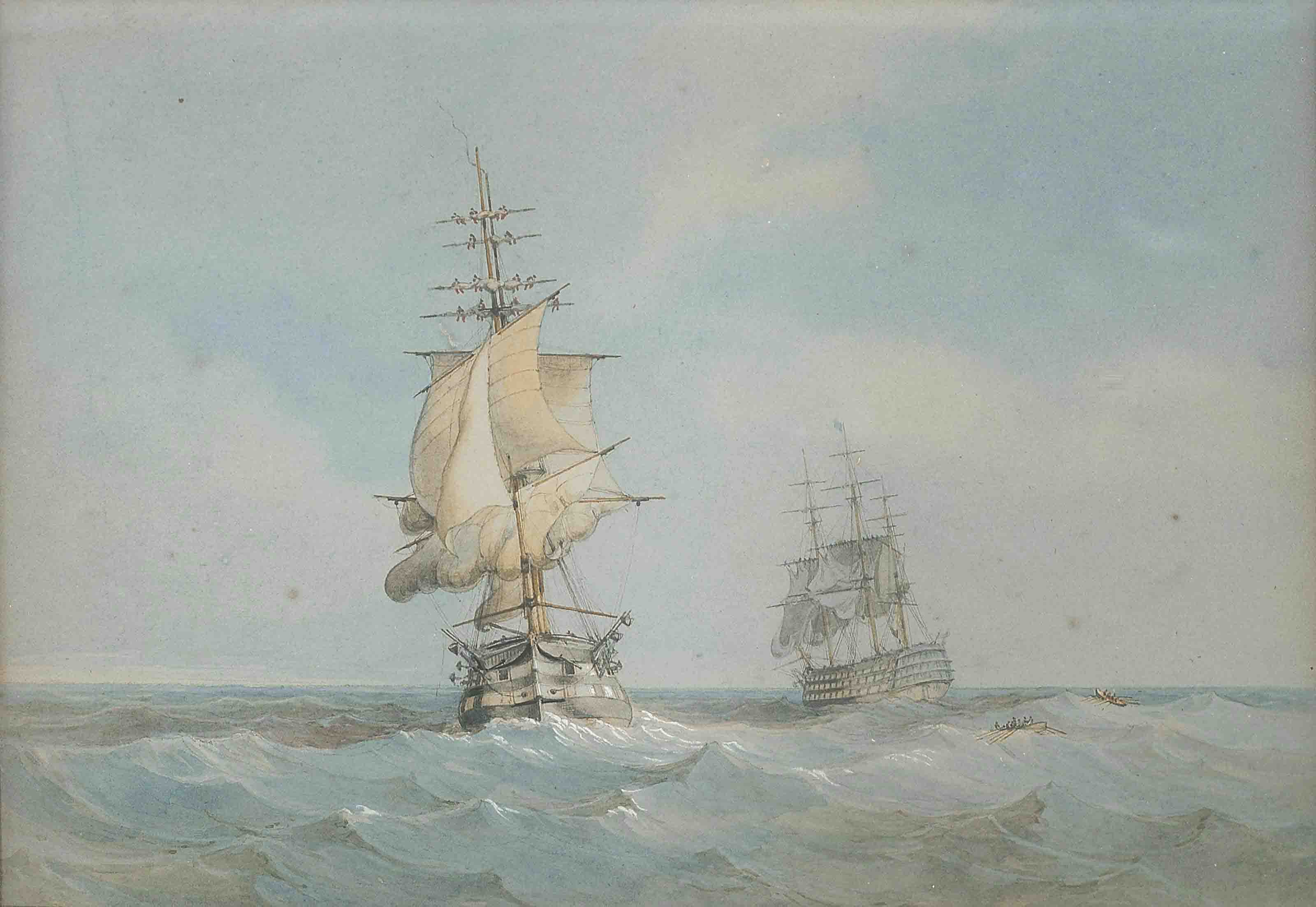
- Centurion (foreground) and Royal Albert (rear) attempt to save a man overboard, circa 1857–1858, by Giovanni Schranz, based on a sketch by Captain Francis Egerton of the Royal Albert

History

United Kingdom
- Name: Centurion
- Ordered: 18 March 1839
- Builder: Pembroke Dockyard
- Laid down: July 1839
- Launched: 2 May 1844
- Completed: 10 June 1844
- Commissioned: 1 January 1856
- Decommissioned: 30 November 1861
- Fate: Sold for scrap, 19 March 1870

General characteristics
- Class & type: 80-gun, second-rate, Vanguard-class ship of the line
- Displacement: 3,482 long tons (3,538 t)
- Tons burthen: 2,589 63/94 (bm)
- Length: 190 ft (57.9 m) (gun deck)
- Beam: 57 ft 1 in (17.4 m)
- Draught: 25 ft 3 in (7.7 m)
- Depth of hold: 23 ft 4 in (7.1 m)
- Installed power: Boilers; 1,255 ihp (936 kW; 1,272 PS)
- Propulsion: 1 screw; single-expansion steam engine
- Sail plan: Full-rigged ship
- Speed: 8.5 kn (15.7 km/h; 9.8 mph)
- Complement: 750
- Armament: 80 muzzle-loading, smoothbore guns: Lower gun deck: 10 × 8 in (203 mm) shell guns + 18 × 32 pdr guns; Upper gun deck: 4 × 8 in shell guns + 24 × 32 pdr guns; Forecastle & Quarterdeck: 24 × 32 pdr guns

HMS Centurion was an 80-gun, second rate, Vanguard-class ship of the line built for the Royal Navy in the 1840s. Completed in 1844, she was immediately placed in ordinary. The ship was converted to screw propulsion in 1854–1855. Centurion was assigned to the Mediterranean Fleet and the Channel Squadron before she was paid off in 1861. The ship was sold for scrap in 1870.

== Background and description ==
The Vanguard class was designed by the Surveyor of the Navy, William Symonds, with an emphasis on sailing qualities, rather than battle efficiency as they had a quick roll in poor weather that made them bad gun platforms. Centurion measured 190 feet 8 inches (58.1 m) at the gun deck and 153 feet 5 inches (46.8 m) at the keel. She had a beam of 57 feet 1 inch (17.4 m), a depth of hold of 23 feet 4 inches (7.1 m), and a tonnage of 2,589 83/94 tons burthen. Their crews numbered 720 officers and ratings. The ships had the usual three-masted full-ship rig. Their muzzle-loading, smoothbore armament consisted of thirty 32-pounder (56 cwt) guns (Note: "Cwt" is the abbreviation for hundredweight, 56 cwt referring to the weight of the gun.) on the lower gun deck and twenty-eight 50 cwt, 32-pounder guns on the upper gun deck. Between their forecastle and quarterdeck, they carried twenty-two 42 cwt, 32-pounder guns.

=== Screw conversion ===
Captain Baldwin Wake Walker, Surveyor of the Navy, favored converting first- and second-rate ships as they could accommodate the engines and their required coal better than smaller ships. However, the fine lines and size of Symonds' Vanguards as the smallest second rates dissuaded Walker from investing in full conversions of the ships. The arms race between France and Britain in screw-propelled ships of the line continued even though they were allied during the Crimean War of 1854–1856 against the Russian Empire. Walker ordered Centurion to be converted in 1854 to match the anticipated numbers of French ships. The ship had a draught of 25 feet 3 inches (7.7 m), a displacement of 3,482 long tons (3,538 t), and her crew increased to 750 officers and ratings. Centurion was fitted with a 400-nominal horsepower, single-expansion steam engine built by Miller, Ravenhill & Co. that drove a single propeller. Her boilers produced enough steam that the two-cylinder, horizontal engine produced 1,255 indicated horsepower (936 kW) which gave the ship a speed of 8.5 knots (15.7 km/h; 9.8 mph) during her sea trials in Plymouth on 14 April 1856. To reduce drag and improve performance under sail, the ship could hoist her propeller into the hull and retract the telescoping funnel.

The lower gun deck armament of the converted ships consisted of ten 8 in (203 mm) (65 cwt) shell guns and eighteen (56 cwt) 32-pounders. The upper gun deck had four 8-inch shell guns and twenty-four 32-pounders of 50 cwt. The combined armament of the forecastle and quarterdeck totalled twenty-four 42 cwt 32-pounders.

== Construction and career ==
Named after the Roman military rank, Centurion was the fifth ship of her name to serve in the RN. She was ordered from HM Dockyard, Pembroke, on 18 March 1839 and laid down the following July. She was launched on 2 May 1844 and completed on 10 June. The ship was not fitted out for sea and Centurion was placed in ordinary.

The ship was ordered to be converted to screw propulsion on 10 August 1854 and work began on 29 September. She was undocked on 12 November 1855 and was commissioned by Captain Woodford Williams on 1 January 1855 with an assignment to the Mediterranean Fleet. He was relieved by Captain Edward Fanshawe in May. Fanshawe fell ill in June 1858 and was relieved by Captain George Middleton on 28 June. Middleton was relieved in his turn by Captain George Patey on 10 March 1859. The ship returned home and was paid off on 7 December at Plymouth, but was recommissioned the following day with Patey still in command. He was relieved on 4 January 1860 by Captain Henry Rogers and Centurion was assigned to the Channel Squadron. The ship was paid off for the final time on 30 November. She was sold to William Lethbridge for scrap on 19 March 1870.

== Figurehead ==
The figurehead was carved by Hellyer & Sons, Portsmouth, and is now in the National Museum of the Royal Navy, Portsmouth.
