= HMS Goliath (1842) =

Vanguard-class ship of the line

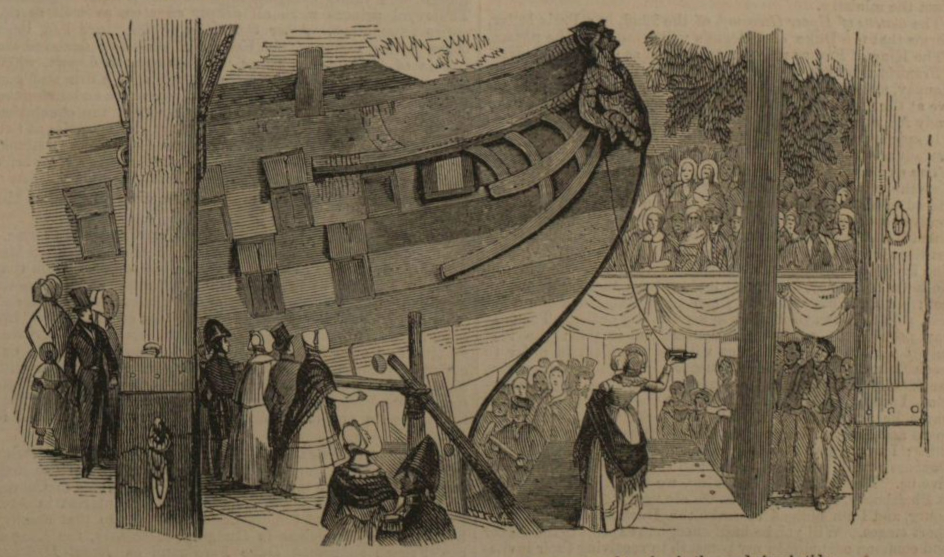
- The Duchess of Buccleuch launches the Goliath

History

United Kingdom
- Name: Goliath
- Ordered: 7 October 1833
- Builder: Chatham Dockyard
- Laid down: February 1834
- Launched: 25 July 1842
- Fate: Burnt, 22 December 1875

General characteristics
- Class & type: 80-gun, second-rate, Vanguard-class ship of the line
- Displacement: 3,482 long tons (3,538 t)
- Tons burthen: 2,589 61/94 (bm)
- Length: 190 ft (57.9 m) (gun deck)
- Beam: 56 ft 10 in (17.3 m)
- Draught: 25 ft 3 in (7.7 m)
- Depth of hold: 23 ft 4 in (7.1 m)
- Installed power: Boilers; 1,438 ihp (1,072 kW; 1,458 PS)
- Propulsion: 1 screw; single-expansion steam engine
- Sail plan: Full-rigged ship
- Speed: 9.2 kn (17.0 km/h; 10.6 mph)
- Complement: 750
- Armament: 80 muzzle-loading, smoothbore guns: Lower gun deck: 10 × 8 in (203 mm) shell guns + 18 × 32 pdr guns; Upper gun deck: 4 × 8 in shell guns + 24 × 32 pdr guns; Forecastle & Quarterdeck: 24 × 32 pdr guns

HMS Goliath was an 80-gun, second rate, Vanguard-class ship of the line built for the Royal Navy (RN) during the 1840s. She was converted to screw propulsion in 1856–1857 during an arms race in screw-propelled ships of the line between Britain and France. The ship was never commissioned and only went to sea to conduct her sea trials. Goliath was lent to the Forest Gate School Ships Committee in 1870 to train poor boys in nautical occupations. The ship was destroyed by fire five years later with 15 missing or dead. Her wreck was sold for scrap the following year.

== Background and description ==
The Vanguard class was designed by the Surveyor of the Navy, William Symonds, with an emphasis on sailing qualities, rather than battle efficiency as they had a quick roll in poor weather that made them bad gun platforms. The ships measured 190 feet (57.9 m) at the gun deck and 155 feet 3 inches (47.3 m) at the keel. They had a beam of 56 feet 9 inches (17.3 m), a depth of hold of 23 feet 4 inches (7.1 m) and a tonnage of 2,589 81/94 tons burthen. Their crews numbered 720 officers and ratings. The ships had the usual three-masted full-ship rig. Their muzzle-loading, smoothbore armament consisted of thirty 32-pounder (56 cwt) guns (Note: "Cwt" is the abbreviation for hundredweight, 56 cwt referring to the weight of the gun.) on the lower gun deck and twenty-eight 50 cwt, 32-pounder guns on the upper gun deck. Between their forecastle and quarterdeck, they carried twenty-two 42 cwt, 32-pounder guns.

Well before Vanguard was completed in 1836, Symonds had begun modifying the ship's plans to improve it's ability to carry weight and to improve her seakeeping, but Vanguard and Goliath were too far along for the changes to be applied. The former ship's stern had such a large overhang that gunnery trials in May 1846 with her stern guns set the stern on fire. Goliath's stern was modified as much as possible to reduce the problem, but the solution was incompetently executed, leaving "the stern timbers badly arranged, weakly supported and held together with iron straps". These problems may explain why Goliath was never commissioned.

=== Screw conversion ===
Based on the experiences gained during the Crimean War, Captain Baldwin Wake Walker, Surveyor of the Navy, favored converting first- and second-rate ships as they could accommodate the engines and their required coal better than smaller ships. However, the fine lines and size of Symonds' Vanguards as the smallest second rates dissuaded Walker from investing in full conversions of the ships. The arms race between France and Britain in screw-propelled ships of the line had resumed after the Crimean War ended in 1856 and Walker ordered Goliath to be converted on 20 August of that year to match the anticipated numbers of French ships. The ship had a draught of 25 feet 3 inches (7.7 m), a displacement of 3,482 long tons (3,538 t), and her crew increased to 750 officers and ratings. Goliath was fitted with a 400-nominal horsepower, trunk steam engine built by John Penn and Sons. Her boilers produced enough steam that the two-cylinder, horizontal engine produced 1,438 indicated horsepower (1,072 kW) which gave the ship a speed of 9.2 knots (17.0 km/h; 10.6 mph) during her sea trials in the Thames River on 14 August 1858, albeit without masts or stores. To reduce drag and improve performance under sail, the ship could hoist her propeller into the hull and retract the telescoping funnel.

The lower gun deck armament of the converted ships consisted of ten 8 in (203 mm) (65 cwt) shell guns and eighteen (56 cwt) 32-pounders. The upper gun deck had four 8-inch shell guns and twenty-four 32-pounders of 50 cwt. The combined armament of the forecastle and quarterdeck totalled twenty-four 42 cwt, 32-pounders.

== Construction and career ==
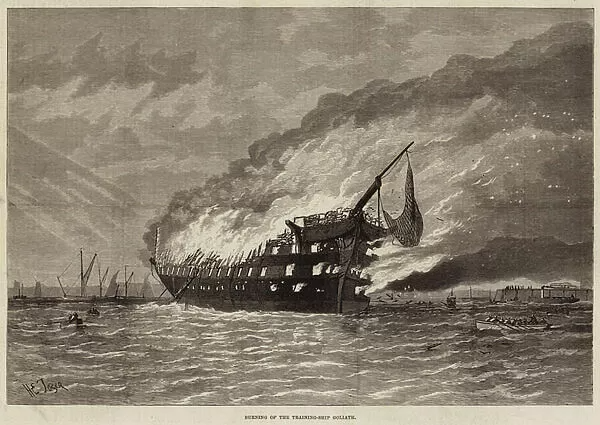
Burning of the Training-Ship Goliath, The Illustrated London News, 1876

Named for the Biblical giant, Goliath was the second ship of her name to serve with the RN. The ship was ordered from HM Dockyard, Chatham, on 9 October 1833 and was laid down in February 1834. She was launched on 25 July 1842 and was completed on 7 October and immediately placed in ordinary.

Conversion of the ship to screw propulsion was ordered on 20 August 1856 and work began on 16 October. Goliath was undocked on 30 November 1857 and completed at Sheerness Dockyard on 30 April 1858. She was placed in ordinary there and was never completed for sea. The ship was lent to the Forest Gate School Ships Committee to serve as a training ship for poor boys in November 1870. Goliath was destroyed by fire on 22 December 1875 while at anchor in the River Thames near Grays. One of the boys dropped a kerosene lamp and the fire could not be contained. The ship broke free from her moorings and drifted onto a mudbank where she burnt to the waterline. Of the 459 boys and staff members aboard, only 15 were listed as missing or dead, although some may have absconded. The wreck was sold for scrap the following year.
