= List of shipwrecks in December 1875 =

The list of shipwrecks in December 1875 includes ships sunk, foundered, grounded, or otherwise lost during December 1875.

== 1 December ==
List of shipwrecks: 1 December 1875
Ship	State	Description
Carthaginian	United Kingdom	The ship collided with the barque Biola (Sweden) off the Smalls Lighthouse, Cornwall and was abandoned. She was towed in to Wexford in a derelict condition by the steamship Briton (United Kingdom).
Chosen	United Kingdom	The lugger was driven ashore and wrecked at Great Yarmouth, Norfolk.
Hannah	Norway	The schooner was wrecked on Anholt. Her crew survived. She was on a voyage from Dundee, Forfarshire, United Kingdom to Aarhus, Denmark.
James Duncan	United Kingdom	The ship was driven ashore at Port Mulgrave, Nova Scotia, Canada. She was on a voyage from Charlottetown, Prince Edward Island, Canada to Charlestown, Cornwall.
Jane Butcher	United Kingdom	The ship was severely damaged by fire at Swansea, Glamorgan.
Lawton	United Kingdom	The sloop foundered off North Berwick, Lothian with the loss of one of her three crew.
Sunnyside	United States	The steamboat was holed by ice and sank in the Hudson River at West Point, New York with the loss of eleven lives.
Sylvia	United Kingdom	The ship was driven ashore at Cascumpec, Prince Edward Island. She was on a voyage from Cascumpec to Queenstown, County Cork.
Utrecht	Netherlands	The ship caught fire at Batavia, Netherlands East Indies. She was on a voyage from Newcastle upon Tyne, Northumberland, United Kingdom. The fire was extinguished and she was taken in to Samarang, Netherlands East Indies.

== 2 December ==
List of shipwrecks: 2 December 1875
Ship	State	Description
Auk	United Kingdom	The steamship ran aground in the Nieuwe Waterweg. She was on a voyage from Liverpool, Lancashire to Rotterdam, South Holland, Netherlands. She was refloated.
Catherine Hendry	United Kingdom	The schooner was sunk by ice in the Elbe downstream of Neumühlen, Germany. She was on a voyage from Hamburg, Germany to Burntisland, Fife.
Florence Nightingale	United Kingdom	The tug was run into by Queen of the Mersey (United Kingdom) and sank at Cardiff, Glamorgan.
Jane T. Woodall	United Kingdom	The ship was driven ashore at "Balerma", Spain.
Karen Botele	Denmark	The ship was wrecked on Ameland, Friesland, Netherlands with the loss of all hands.
Marienburg	Germany	The steamship ran aground at Brielle, South Holland. She was on a voyage from Memel to Rotterdam. She was refloated.
Unnamed	Flag unknown	The schooner ran aground on Taylor's Bank, in Liverpool Bay.
Unnamed	United States	The steamboat was sunk by ice in the Hudson River with the loss of eleven lives.

== 3 December ==
List of shipwrecks: 3 December 1875
Ship	State	Description
Bertha	United Kingdom	The schooner was driven ashore in the River Thames at Blackwall, Middlesex. She was on a voyage from London to Cork. She was refloated.
Jacques Marie	France	The sloop was run into by the steamship Tiara (United Kingdom) and sank in the English Channel. Her crew survived. Jacques Marie was on a voyage from Granville, Manche and/or Saint Malo, Ille-et-Vilaine to Exeter, Devon, United Kingdom.
Maggie	United Kingdom	The ship departed from the River Tyne for Lisbon, Portugal. No further trace, reported missing.
Sir John Lawrence	United Kingdom	The ship was damaged by fire at Sydney, New South Wales.
Sligo	United Kingdom	The steamship ran aground at Wexford. She was on a voyage from Liverpool, Lancashire to Wexford.
Palma	United Kingdom	The steamship ran aground at Hirsholmene, Denmark. She was on a voyage from Hartlepool, County Durham to Kiel, Germany. She was refloated and resumed her voyage.
River Clyde	United Kingdom	The ship was driven at "North Coleroon". She was on a voyage from Middlesbrough, Yorkshire to Porto Novo, Cape Verde Islands.
Ybarra No. 2	Spain	The ship ran aground. She was refloated and put in to Lowestoft, Suffolk, United Kingdom.
Unnamed	United Kingdom	The fishing smack was run down and sunk in the English Channel 4 nautical miles (7.4 km) off The Mewstone, Devon by the brigantine Frederick (United Kingdom with the loss of all four crew.

== 4 December ==
List of shipwrecks: 4 December 1875
Ship	State	Description
Ant	United Kingdom	The schooner ran aground on the Burbo Bank, in Liverpool Bay. She was refloated on 7 December and beached near Egremont, Lancashire.
Havana	United Kingdom	The schooner ran aground on the Great Burbo Bank, in Liverpool Bay. Her crew were rescued by a fishing boat.
Marmora	Denmark	The barque ran aground in Gibraltar Bay.
Transit	United Kingdom	The ship was driven ashore on Langlade Island, Nova Scotia, Canada. She was on a voyage from Shediac, Nova Scotia to Swansea, Glamorgan.
Trio	United Kingdom	The brig foundered in the North Sea 18 nautical miles (33 km) off Kinnaird Head, Aberdeenshire according to a message in a bottle that washed up near Wick, Caithness.
Verbena	United Kingdom	The barque ran aground at Berdyanski, Russia. She was refloated on 8 December and towed in to Berdyanski for repairs.
Vinterflid	Norway	The ship was driven ashore at Gioia Tauro, Italy. Her crew were rescued.

== 5 December ==
List of shipwrecks: 5 December 1875
Ship	State	Description
Capella	United Kingdom	The brig was driven ashore on Bornholm, Denmark with the loss of all hands.
Echo	Norway	The brig sprang a leak and was abandoned in the North Sea. All eleven people on board were rescued by the brig Vanquisher (United Kingdom). Echo was on a voyage from South Shields, County Durham, United Kingdom to Christiania. She was driven ashore and wrecked north of Whitby, Yorkshire, United Kingdom the next day.
Ellen	United Kingdom	The schooner collided with the schooner Eureka (United Kingdom) and sank in the North Sea off Great Yarmouth, Norfolk.
Ems	United Kingdom	The steamship collided with the steamship Richmond (United Kingdom) and sank in the River Thames. Ems was on a voyage from London to Hull, Yorkshire. She was refloated on 14 December and towed in to London.
Janet Izat	United Kingdom	The brig was driven ashore and damaged at Höganäs, Sweden. She was on a voyage from Ystad, Sweden to Hartlepool, County Durham. She was refloated on 9 December and towed in to Helsingør, Denmark for repairs.
Lass o' Doon	United Kingdom	The schooner was wrecked on the Annat Bank, off Montrose, Forfarshire. Her crew and local boatmen who had boarded the vessel in an attempt to refloat her - 35 people in total, were rescued by the Montrose Lifeboat. She was on a voyage from Sunderland, County Durham to Montrose.
Peri	United Kingdom	The brig was driven ashore at Santander, Spain. She was on a voyage from Ardrossan, Ayrshire to Santander.
Selma	United Kingdom	The barque was driven ashore and wrecked at "Thiessen". Her crew were rescued.
Tordenskjold	Norway	The schooner was driven ashore at "Egenschage". She was refloated on 14 December and taken in to Hals, Denmark.

== 6 December ==
List of shipwrecks: 6 December 1875
Ship	State	Description
Ada	United Kingdom	The brig was driven ashore and sank at "Siggen". Her crew were rescued. She was on a voyage from South Shields, County Durham to Danzig, Germany.
Celerity	United Kingdom	The ship was driven ashore at Orford Haven, Suffolk. Her crew were rescued. She was refloated on 14 December.
Damietta	United Kingdom	The steamship was driven ashore near Grimstad, Norway. She was on a voyage from Ängelholm, Sweden to Middlesbrough, Yorkshire. She was refloated the next day and taken in to Grimstad.
Deutschland	Germany	The wreck of Deutschland The Norddeutscher Lloyd steamship was wrecked on Kentish Knock sandbank with the loss about 52 lives. A total of 173 survivors were rescued by the tug Liverpool (United Kingdom), one made it to shore in a lifeboat.
Estafelle	Germany	The ship was driven ashore and wrecked at Dungeness, Kent, United Kingdom.
Falger	Norway	The brig was run into by the barque Lalla Rookh ( Canada) and sank in the English Channel 20 nautical miles (37 km) off Portland, Dorset, United Kingdom, with the loss of a crew member. Survivors were rescued by Lalla Rookh. Falger was on a voyage from Dublin, United Kingdom, to Fredrikstad.
Margaret	United Kingdom	The brig was driven ashore at Beddingestrand, Sweden. Her crew were rescued. She was on a voyage from Slite, Sweden to Poole, Dorset.
Mary C. Wilson	United Kingdom	The steamship caught fire at Tralee, County Kerry.
Mary Jane	United Kingdom	The ship was wrecked on the Heaps, in the North Sea off the coast of Essex. Her crew got aboard the Swin Middle Lightship ( Trinity House), from where they were rescued by the smack Mary Ann (United Kingdom).
Ocean Wave	United Kingdom	The ship was driven ashore on Bornholm, Denmark. Her crew were rescued. She was on a voyage from Riga, Russia to Leith, Lothian.
Reliance	United Kingdom	The tug struck the wreck of the steamship Gladstone (United Kingdom).off the Haisborough Sands, in the North Sea off the coast of Norfolk. Reliance was beached near Eccles-on-Sea, Norfolk. She was on a voyage from Leith to Great Yarmouth, Norfolk.
Speculator	United Kingdom	The barque was wrecked on the Haisborough Sands with the loss of five of her ten crew. Survivors were rescued by the steamship Shoreham (United Kingdom). Speculator was on a voyage from South Shields, County Durham to Genoa, Italy.
Therese	United Kingdom	The ship was destroyed by fire off the Cape of Good Hope, Cape Colony. She was on avoyage from Liverpool, Lancashire to Rangoon, Burma.
Three Anns	United Kingdom	The sloop was driven ashore at Gorleston, Suffolk. Her crew were rescued. She was on a voyage from Goole, Yorkshire to Mistley, Essex.
Virgin	United Kingdom	The ship was driven ashore at Orford Haven. Her crew were rescued. She was on a voyage from Caernarfon to Newcastle upon Tyne, Northumberland. She was refloated on 13 December.
Wanderer	United Kingdom	The ship ran aground on the Longsand, in the North Sea off the coast of Essex. She was on a voyage from Granton, Lothian to Cuba. She was refloated the next day and taken in to The Downs in a leaky condition.
X. L.	United Kingdom	The schooner was wrecked at Winterton-on-Sea, Norfolk with the loss of two of her four crew. Survivors were rescued by rocket apparatus.

== 7 December ==
List of shipwrecks: 7 December 1875
Ship	State	Description
Alford	United Kingdom	The ship was driven ashore at Skegness, Lincolnshire.
Echo	United Kingdom	The ship was severely damaged by fire at London.
Quail	United Kingdom	The steamship ran aground near Maassluis, South Holland, Netherlands. She was on a voyage from Liverpool, Lancashire to Rotterdam, South Holland. She was refloated.
Star	United Kingdom	The ketch was driven ashore at Wainfleet, Lincolnshire. She was on a voyage from Hull, Yorkshire to Poole, Dorset.

== 8 December ==
List of shipwrecks: 8 December 1875
Ship	State	Description
Comeet	Netherlands	The steamship ran aground at Maassluis, South Holland. She was on a voyage from Rotterdam, South Holland to Königsberg, Germany.
Daisy	United Kingdom	The brig was driven ashore at Alexandroupoli, Greece. She was refloated on 16 December and towed in to Constantinople, Ottoman Empire.
Jernas	Norway	The ship ran aground on the Cross Sand, in the North Sea off the coast of Suffolk, United Kingdom. She was refloated with the assistance of a tug and taken in to Lowestoft, Suffolk in a severely leaky condition.
Juno	United Kingdom	The brigantine was run into by the steamship Blenheim (United Kingdom) and sank in the Thames Estuary 1.5 nautical miles (2.8 km) south east of the Mouse Lightship ( Trinity House ). Her crew were rescued.
Martinus en Henriette	Netherlands	The steamship ran aground in the Veutjersgat. She was on a voyage from Dordrecht, South Holland to London, United Kingdom. She was refloated.
Neni	Austria-Hungary	The brig was wrecked at Conil de la Frontera, Spain with the loss of four of her crew. She was on a voyage from Newcastle upon Tyne, Northumberland, United Kingdom to Trieste.
Queen of the West	United Kingdom	The schooner was driven ashore near Tarifa, Spain.
Ruhtinas	Flag unknown	The ship ran aground in St. Helen's Sound and was severely damaged. She was on a voyage from the Bull River to a British port.
Theresa	United Kingdom	The barque was destroyed by fire in the Indian Ocean. Her crew were rescued by Shahpore (India). Theresa was on a voyage from Liverpool, Lancashire to Rangoon, Burma.

== 9 December ==
List of shipwrecks: 9 December 1875
Ship	State	Description
Algeria	Spain	The steamship was driven ashore and wrecked at "St. John's", Puerto Rico. She was on a voyage from Barcelona to St. John's.
Arch-Druid	United Kingdom	The steamship was driven ashore 20 nautical miles (37 km) north east of Sulina, Ottoman Empire. She was on a voyage from Odesa, Russia to Sulina. She was refloated and taken in to Sulina.
Blücher	Germany	The ship departed from Doboy, Georgia, United States for Hull, Yorkshire. No further trace, presumed foundered with the loss of all ten crew.
Severn	United Kingdom	The steamship ran aground near Sandhamn, Sweden. She was refloated but found to be leaky.

== 10 December ==
List of shipwrecks: 10 December 1875
Ship	State	Description
Ada and Etta	United Kingdom	The ship was run down by a steamship and sank in the River Thames at Blackwall, Middlesex.
Adventure	United Kingdom	The ship ran aground on the Goodwin Sands, Kent. She was on a voyage from South Shields, County Durham to Lisbon, Portugal. She was refloated.
Consul Platen	Norway	The barque ran aground on the Goodwin Sands. She was on a voyage from Arkhangelsk, Russia to Gloucester, United Kingdom. She was refloated and towed in to the River Thames.
Hartstene	United States	The ship was driven ashore at Torekov, Sweden. She was on a voyage from Charleston, South Carolina to Reval, Russia. She was refloated and taken in to Helsingør, Denmark in a leaky condition.
Holly Bough	United Kingdom	The ship collided with the steamship Lyra or Sayn (Germany) in the Dardanelles off "Nagara" and was severely damaged. She was on a voyage from Constantinople, Ottoman Empire to Alexandroupoli, Greece. She was towed in to Constantinople for repairs.
Ida	Russia	The schooner was driven ashore at Torekov. She was on a voyage from Papenburg, Germany to Saint Petersburg.
Julien Marie	France	The ship ran aground. She was on a voyage from Nantes, Loire-Inférieure to Wexford, United Kingdom. She was refloated and put in to Brest, Finistère.
Millicent	Netherlands	The ship struck King Phillip's Rock. She was on a voyage from Padstow, Cornwall to Newport, Monmouthshire, United Kingdom. She put back to Padstow.
Olga	Russia	The schooner was driven ashore at Torekov. She was on a voyage from Grimsby, Lincolnshire, United Kingdom to Copenhagen, Denmark.
Rival	United Kingdom	The schooner was run into by the steamship Pioneer (United Kingdom and sank in the River Laggan. Rival was on a voyage from Garston, Lancashire to Belfast, County Antrim. She was refloated on 15 December and taken in to Belfast.
Unnamed	Flag unknown	The ship capsized at Walker on Tyne, Northumberland, United Kingdom.

== 11 December ==
List of shipwrecks: 11 December 1875
Ship	State	Description
Anniversary	United Kingdom	The brig ran aground on the Goodwin Sands, Kent. She was refloated and resumed her voyage.
Hartstene	United States	The schooner ran aground off Torekov, Sweden. She was on a voyage from Charleston, South Carolina to Reval, Russia. She was refloated and taken in to Helsingør, Denmark in a leaky condition.
Ida	Russia	The schooner ran aground off Torekov. She was on a voyage from Papenburg, Germany to Saint Petersburg.
Julien Marie	France	The ship struck a submerged object and was damaged. She put in to Brest, Finistère. She was on a voyage from Nantes, Loire-Inférieure to Wexford, United Kingdom.
Lilie	Germany	The schooner collided with the ship Heinrich (Germany) and sank off Morups Tånge, Sweden. Her crew survived.
Louise	Netherlands	The full-rigged ship was driven ashore and wrecked at "Tafilhoek", on "Bute Island", Netherlands East Indies with the loss of two of her crew. She was on a voyage from Amsterdam, North Holland to Surabaya, Netherlands East Indies.
Olga	Russia	The ship ran aground off Torekov. She was on a voyage from Grimsby, Lincolnshire, United Kingdom to Copenhagen, Denmark.
Sarnia	(United Kingdom of Great Britain and Ireland) Guernsey	The schooner was run into by the steamship Minerva (United Kingdom) and sank 9 nautical miles (17 km) off "Cape Chaque", Cornwall. Her crew were rescued by Minerva. Sarnia was on a voyage from Guernsey to London.
Zephyr	France	The chasse-marée ran aground and sank on the Longsand, in the North Sea off the coast of Essex, United Kingdom. Her crew were rescued. She was on a voyage from Newcastle upon Tyne, Northumberland, United Kingdom to Fécamp, Seine-Inférieure.

== 12 December ==
List of shipwrecks: 12 December 1875
Ship	State	Description
Ella	United Kingdom	The steamship ran aground at Fredrikshavn, Denmark. She was refloated and resumed her voyage.
George E. Thatcher	United States	The ship was driven ashore at Boulogne, Pas-de-Calais, France. She was on a voyage from Baltimore, Maryland to Dunkirk, Nord, France. She was refloated.
Messina	United Kingdom	The schooner departed from San Francisco, California, United States for Liverpool, Lancashire. No further trace, presumed foundered with the loss of all hands.
Rudolf Tornerjelm	Sweden	The steamship was damaged by ice at Stockholm and became waterlogged.
Surat	United Kingdom	The steamship ran aground at Malta. She was refloated, and resumed her voyage the next day.

== 13 December ==
List of shipwrecks: 13 December 1875
Ship	State	Description
John Taylor	United Kingdom	The steamship struck the quayside at Liverpool, Lancashire and sank at the bow. She was on a voyage from Mostyn, Flintshire to Liverpool.
Marianthi	(Ottoman Empire) Cyprus	The ship was wrecked by ice at Taganrog, Russia.
Mosel, and Simsom	Germany	The steamship Mosul was severely damaged by an explosion of dynamite on the quayside at Bremerhaven that killed 80 people and injured 100. The accidental and premature explosion was part of an insurance fraud. One person was arrested. He later committed suicide. The tug Simson was also damaged by the explosion.
Pallas	Netherlands	The steamship ran aground near Ochakiv, Russia. She was on a voyage from Nicolaieff, Russia to Rotterdam, South Holland.
Succes	France	The ship was driven ashore at Dénia, Spain with the loss of seven lives. She was on a voyage from Marseille, Bouches-du-Rhône to Sierra Leone.
Sydenham	United Kingdom	The steamship ran aground at Porto Tolle, Italy. She was on a voyage from Malta to Venice, Kingdom of Italy. She was refloated on 28 December and taken in to Malamocco, Italy.
Waterhen	United Kingdom	The brig was driven ashore on Eriskay, Outer Hebrides.

== 14 December ==
List of shipwrecks: 14 December 1875
Ship	State	Description
Emma	United Kingdom	The barque sank at London. She was refloated and beached.
Gitana	United Kingdom	The steamship was wrecked near the Vinga Lighthouse, Sweden. She was on a voyage from West Hartlepool, County Durham to Gothenburg, Sweden.
Isabella Haydn	United Kingdom	The ship was driven ashore and wrecked in Rocky Bay. She was on a voyage from Liverpool, Lancashire to Shediac, Nova Scotia, Canada.
Junior	United Kingdom	The ship was driven ashore near "Durserort". Her crew were rescued.
Lotto	Norway	The ship foundered in the North Sea off the coast of Yorkshire, United Kingdom, according to a message in a bottle that washed up near Lowestoft, Suffolk, United Kingdom.
Schwan	Germany	The steamship ran aground in the Weser. She was on a voyage from Hull, Yorkshire to Bremen.

== 15 December ==
List of shipwrecks: 15 December 1875
Ship	State	Description
Alliance	United Kingdom	The ship was driven ashore at Sellafield, Cumberland. She was on a voyage from Bangor to Workington, Cumberland.
Brothers	United Kingdom	The brig ran aground on the Frying Pan Shoals. She was on a voyage from Liverpool, Lancashire to Sandy Hook, New Jersey, United States. She was refloated and resumed her voyage.
Eintracht	Germany	The brig was driven ashore at Wittow, Rügen. She was on a voyage from St Davids, Pembrokeshire, United Kingdom to Stettin. She was refloated with assistance from the steamship Scandinavien (Denmark), which towed her to Stettin.
Ellas	Greece	The ship was wrecked near Balchik, Russia.
Ellen F	Canada	The ship was driven ashore on Cay Verde, Bahamas. She was on a voyage from Pictou, Nova Scotia to Cárdenas, Cuba.
Golden Horn	United Kingdom	The steamship was driven ashore at Spurn Point, Yorkshire. She was on a voyage from Alexandria, Egypt to Hull, Yorkshire. She was refloated with assistance from the tug Wilberforce (United Kingdom) and taken in to Hull.
Julia H. Dillingham	United Kingdom	The ship was wrecked near "Monte Rugginoso" with the loss of all but two of her crew. She was on a voyage from Gorée, Senegal to Marseille, Bouches-du-Rhône, France.
Maria Josephina	Italy	The ship ran aground on the Blacktail Sand, in the Thames Estuary. She was on a voyage from San Francisco, California, United States to Newcastle upon Tyne, Northumberland, United Kingdom and Genoa. She was refloated and taken in to Gravesend, Kent, United Kingdom in a leaky condition.
Urania	Germany	The schooner foundered off Boa Vista, Cape Verde Islands. Her crew were rescued. She was on a voyage from Hamburg to Montevideo, Uruguay.

== 16 December ==
List of shipwrecks: 16 December 1875
Ship	State	Description
Alice Gray	United States	The steamboat sank in the Missouri River at Rocheport, Missouri, after her boiler exploded.
Bergen	Netherlands	The steamship was driven ashore at Ter Heijde, South Holland. She was on a voyage from Grangemouth, Stirlingshire, United Kingdom to Rotterdam, South Holland. She was refloated.
Colina	United Kingdom	The steamship was driven ashore in the Scheldt at Lillo, Antwerp, Belgium. She was on a voyage from Antwerp to Glasgow, Renfrewshire. She was refloated on 18 December and resumed her voyage.
Plover	United Kingdom	The steamship struck the quayside and sank at Calais, France. She was refloated the next day.
Savernake	United Kingdom	The steamship struck the quayside at Sunderland, County Durham and was severely damaged at the bow.
Urania	Germany	The schooner was wrecked off Boa Vista, Cape Verde Islands. Her crew were rescued. She was on a voyage from Hamburg to Montevideo, Uruguay.
Vaderland	United States	The steamship was driven ashore in the Oostgat. She was on a voyage from Philadelphia, Pennsylvania to Antwerp. She was refloated on 18 December.

== 17 December ==
List of shipwrecks: 17 December 1875
Ship	State	Description
Alert	United Kingdom	The brig was driven ashore at Souter Point, Northumberland. She was on a voyage from Rouen, Seine-Inférieure, France to North Shields, Northumberland. She was refloated the next day and taken in to the River Tyne.
Eunomia	United Kingdom	The ship ran aground on the Kalkgrund, in the Baltic Sea. She was on a voyage from Nyborg, Denmark to Hull, Yorkshire. She was refloated with assistance.
German Emperor	United Kingdom	The steamship ran aground at Sunderland, County Durham.
Siam	France	The barque was driven ashore at North Sunderland, Northumberland, United Kingdom. She was on a voyage from Iquique, Peru to Berwick upon Tweed, Northumberland. She was refloated and resumed her voyage.
Sunderland, and an unnamed vessel	United Kingdom	The schooner Sunderland and the tug that was towing her were driven ashore at Whitburn, County Durham.
Tirreno	Italy	The ship was wrecked at "Chabla", Ottoman Empire.
Walter J. Cumming	United Kingdom	The ship ran aground in the River Exe. She was on a voyage from Middlesbrough, Yorkshire to Exmouth, Devon. She was refloated.
Unnamed	Flag unknown	The barque was run down by a steamship and sank in the River Thames at Blackwall, Middlesex, United Kingdom.

== 18 December ==
List of shipwrecks: 18 December 1875
Ship	State	Description
SMS Arkona	Imperial German Navy	The corvette ran aground at Lønstrup, Denmark. She was refloated and resumed her voyage.
Brisbane	South Australia	The ship ran aground on the Angelica Reef, in the Flores Sea. Her passengers were taken off. She was refloated on 9 January 1876 and taken in to Surabaya, Netherlands East Indies.
Darien	United Kingdom	The steamship ran aground on Sarn Badrig, in Cardigan Bay. She was on a voyage from Norfolk, Virginia, United States to Liverpool, Lancashire. She was refloated and completed her voyage in a leaky condition.
Lady Octavia	United Kingdom	The ship ran aground on the Gaa Bank, in the River Tay. She was on a voyage from Calcutta, India to Dundee, Forfarshire. She was refloated with assistance.
Rotterdam	Netherlands	The steamship ran aground at Maassluis, South Holland. She was on a voyage from New York, United States to Rotterdam, South Holland.
Sirene	United Kingdom	The ship was driven ashore at Svenstrup, Denmark. She was on a voyage from Grangemouth, Stirlingshire to Copenhagen, Denmark.
Thyra	Denmark	The ship ran aground on the Vilingbak.

== 19 December ==
List of shipwrecks: 19 December 1875
Ship	State	Description
Adolphina	United Kingdom	The schooner was driven ashore at Saltfleet, Lincolnshire.
Aphrodite	United Kingdom	The ship was wrecked on the Shipwash Sand, in the North Sea off the coast of Suffolk. Her crew survived. She was on a voyage from Granton, Lothian to London.
Glannibanta	United Kingdom	The steamship ran aground at Granton and was damaged. She was on a voyage from London to Granton. She was refloated.
Warkworth Castle	United Kingdom	The steamship ran aground at Dunkirk, Nord, France.

== 20 December ==
List of shipwrecks: 20 December 1875
Ship	State	Description
Carolina	United Kingdom	The ship ran aground near Halmstad, Sweden. She was on a voyage from Leith, Lothian to Copenhagen, Denmark.
Gironde, and Louisiane	France	The steamship Louisiane was run into by the steamship Gironde and sank in the Gironde with the loss of sixteen of the 128 people on board. Sixty-four survivors were rescued by Gironde, and 45 by the steamship Iberia (United Kingdom). Louisiane was on a voyage from the West Indies to Bordeaux, Gironde. Gironde was severely damaged. She was on a voyage from Bordeaux to Rio de Janeiro, Brazil.
Hilma	Russia	The schooner was driven ashore on Hiiumaa.
Imju	Russia	The brig ran aground at "Holmentunge", Denmark. She was on a voyage from Granton, Lothian to Pillau, Germany. She was refloated and found to be leaky.
Isla	United Kingdom	The ship was driven ashore near Pará, Brazil. She was on a voyage from Dundee, Forfarshire to Pará.
Louie	Italy	The ship was run down and sunk in the Strait of Gibraltar by the steamship Milton (United Kingdom). Louie was on a voyage from the Newfoundland Colony to Genoa.
Mary Ann	(United Kingdom of Great Britain and Ireland) Guernsey	The barque collided with the steamship Corinna (United Kingdom) and sank in the River Thames at Blackwall, Middlesex. Mary Ann was on a voyage from Guernsey to London.
Reaper	United Kingdom	The brigantine was driven ashore and wrecked 4 nautical miles (7.4 km) west of Spiddal, County Galway. She was on a voyage from Saint John, New Brunswick, Canada to Galway.
Statesman	United Kingdom	The steamship was driven ashore near Málaga, Spain. She was refloated.
St. Enoch	United Kingdom	The ship was driven ashore in the Hooghly River. She was on a voyage from Dundee, Forfarshire to Calcutta, India.
S. W. Kelly	United Kingdom	The steamship ran aground in the Dardanelles. She was on a voyage from Cardiff, Glamorgan to Odesa, Russia.

== 21 December ==
List of shipwrecks: 21 December 1875
Ship	State	Description
Dankbaarheid	Netherlands	The schooner was driven ashore and wrecked at Audresselles, Pas-de-Calais, France. She was on a voyage from Cartagena, Spain to Vlaardingen, South Holland.
Exchange	United Kingdom	The schooner collided with Georgina (United Kingdom) and was abandoned by her three crew, who were rescued by Georgina. Exchange was on a voyage from Harwich, Essex to Hull, Yorkshire. She was towed in to Grimsby, Lincolnshire the next day.
Island Belle	(United Kingdom of Great Britain and Ireland) Guernsey	The brig was driven ashore at Bude, Cornwall. Her seven crew were rescued by the Bude Lifeboat. She was on a voyage from Wilmington, North Carolina, United States to Bristol, Gloucestershire.
Maid of Anglesey	United Kingdom	The schooner was driven ashore at Holyhead, Anglesey. She was on a voyage from Cork to Liverpool, Lancashire. She was refloated.
Mermann	Germany	The schooner ran aground on Skagen, Denmark. Her crew were rescued. She was on a voyage from Hull, Yorkshire, United Kingdom to Lübeck. She was refloated.
Ouvrière	France	The ship was driven ashore at Audreselles. She was on a voyage from Huelva, Spain to Dunkirk, Nord.
Seaton	United Kingdom	The barque was driven ashore near Singapore, Straits Settlements.
Syne Jacobs	Netherlands	The ship was driven ashore at Lydd, Kent, United Kingdom. All on board were rescued by the Coastguard. She was on a voyage from Lagos, Lagos Colony to Flensburg, Germany.

== 22 December ==
List of shipwrecks: 22 December 1875
Ship	State	Description
Anna Mitchell	United States	The ship was driven ashore and wrecked on Cuttyhunk Island, Massachusetts. She was on a voyage from Saint Domingo to Boston, Massachusetts.
Capella	United Kingdom	The schooner was driven ashore at Ayr. She was on a voyage from Belfast, County Antrim to Ayr.
Gylfe	Sweden	The ship ran aground at Pensacola, Florida, United States. She was on a voyage from Pensacola to Barrow-in-Furness, Lancashire, United Kingdom. She was refloated and put back to Pensacola.
HMS Goliath	Royal Navy	The Vanguard-class ship of the line, in use as a pauper training ship for workhouse boys, was destroyed by fire at Grays, Essex. Of the approximately 500 on board, 23 of the boys were killed.
Grad Senj	Austria-Hungary	The barque ran aground in the Delaware River. She was on a voyage from Philadelphia, Pennsylvania, United States to Queenstown, County Cork, United Kingdom.
Hawke	United Kingdom	The sloop struck the Plough Sea Rock, off Lindisfarne, Northumberland and sank. Her crew survived. She was on a voyage from South Shields, County Durham to Eyemouth, Berwickshire.
Jane Black	United Kingdom	The brig was driven ashore near Marbella, Spain. Her crew survived.
Jenny	Russia	The barque was driven ashore and wrecked at Pilton, Devon, United Kingdom and was wrecked. Her crew survived. She was on a voyage from Pensacola to Bristol, Gloucestershire, United Kingdom.
Lucy	United Kingdom	The Mersey Flat sank in the River Mersey at Birkenhead, Cheshire.
Mystery	United Kingdom	The brig was driven ashore and wrecked at Brighton, Sussex.
Pincer	United Kingdom	The tug exploded and sank in the Grand Junction Canal at Yardley, near Stoney Stratford, Buckinghamshire with the loss of two lives.
Roxanna	United Kingdom	The steamship collided with the steamship Polam (Flag unknown) and was beached in the River Tyne at South Shields.
Serpentine	United Kingdom	The brigantine was driven ashore near Lecce, Italy. She was a total loss.
Syno Jacobe	Germany	The ship was driven ashore at Lydd, Kent, United Kingdom. All eight people on board were rescued. She was on a voyage from Lagos, Lagos Colony to Flensburg.
Trevithick	United Kingdom	The steamship was wrecked at Petten, North Holland, Netherlands. Her crew were rescued by the Petten Lifeboat. She was on a voyage from the River Tyne to the Nieuw Diep.
Tychitte	France	The barque collided with the barque Mixte (United Kingdom) and sank in the Gironde downstream of Pauillac, Gironde. She was refloated and taken in to Bordeaux, Gironde.
Victoria	United Kingdom	The schooner collided with the barque Frankly (United Kingdom) and sank off Nash Point, Glamorgan. Her crew were rescued. Victoria was on a voyage from Newport, Monmouthshire to Waterford.

== 23 December ==
List of shipwrecks: 23 December 1875
Ship	State	Description
Adolph	Germany	The steamship was driven ashore on Juist and was abandoned by her crew. She was on a voyage from an English port to Geestemünde. She floated off and came ashore on Borkum.
Mimer	United Kingdom	The barque ran aground on the Pagensand, in the North Sea.
Prospect	United Kingdom	The sloop struck the Isingstone, on the coast of Northumberland and was beached at Bamburgh. Her crew were rescued. She was on a voyage from South Shields, County Durham to Largo, Fife.
Riga	Russia	The barque ran aground at Liepāja. She was on a voyage from Hartlepool, County Durham to Liepāja.
Toveruus	(Russian Empire) Grand Duchy of Finland	The barque was run down and sunk in the Clyde at Skelmorlie, Ayrshire, United Kingdom by the steamship Clutha (United Kingdom) with the loss of two of her twelve crew. Nine of the survivors were rescued by Clutha, the tenth was rescued from the wreck the next day by the steamship Largs (United Kingdom). Toveruus was on a voyage from Glasgow, Renfrewshire, United Kingdom to Genoa, Italy.
Volentaire	France	The ship was wrecked at Pará, Brazil. She was on a voyage from Liverpool, Lancashire, United Kingdom to Pará.

== 24 December ==
List of shipwrecks: 24 December 1875
Ship	State	Description
Anna Gertrude	Germany	The ship was driven ashore and wrecked at Langeland, Denmark. Her crew were rescued. She was on a voyage from the Firth of Forth to Kiel.
Duke of Sutherland	United Kingdom	The steamship ran aground on the wreck of Mary Ann (United Kingdom) in the River Thames. She was on a voyage from Calcutta, India to London.
Dunmore	United Kingdom	The ship ran aground at Adelaide, South Australia.
Gem	United Kingdom	The ship was wrecked at Fogo, Cape Verde Islands.

== 25 December ==
List of shipwrecks: 25 December 1875
Ship	State	Description
Cape Comorin	United Kingdom	The ship departed from Liverpool, Lancashire for Bombay, India. Subsequently foundered in the Irish Sea with the loss of all hands; wreckage washed up on the coast of County Wexford in early January 1876.
Mabel	United Kingdom	The barque was damaged by fire at Caldera, Chile.
Osaka-wan	Japan	The transport ship was run into by the steamship Nagoya Maru (Japan) and sank in the Inland Sea of Japan off Uwajima with the loss of 24 of the 85 people on board.

== 26 December ==
List of shipwrecks: 26 December 1875
Ship	State	Description
Lady of the Lake	New Zealand	The 60-ton steamer struck a reef at the northern end of The Catlins, New Zealand, while en route from Dunedin to Port Molyneux, and became a total wreck. The crew abandoned ship in the longboat and made landfall near the mouth of the Catlins River.
Louisa	United Kingdom	The barque ran aground at "Qualon", India. She was on a voyage from Sunderland, County Durham to Kurrachee, India.

== 27 December ==
List of shipwrecks: 27 December 1875
Ship	State	Description
Arichat West	Canada	The ship struck a sunken rock and foundered in The Narrows. She was on a voyage from Sydney, Nova Scotia to Saint John's, Newfoundland Colony.
Colombo	United Kingdom	The ship ran aground on the Flamencos and sank. She was on a voyage from Cardiff, Glamorgan to Panama City, United States of Colombia.
Fanny	United Kingdom	The ship put in to Coquimbo, Chile on fire. She was on a voyage from Swansea, Glamorgan to Valparaíso, Chile. The fire was extinguished.
Fenelon	France	The steamship was driven ashore near "Vittoria", Brazil.
Harnak	Germany	The steamship was driven ashore and sank in Grappler Bay. She was on a voyage from Valparaíso, Chile to Hamburg.

== 28 December ==
List of shipwrecks: 28 December 1875
Ship	State	Description
Ann Clarke	United Kingdom	The ship ran aground on the Maplin Sand, in the North Sea off the coast of Essex.
Britain's Pride	United Kingdom	The ship ran aground on the Maplin Sand.
Isis	United Kingdom	The ship ran aground on the Maplin Sand.

== 29 December ==
List of shipwrecks: 29 December 1875
Ship	State	Description
Crusader	United Kingdom	The ship was driven ashore at Kavanagh's Point, County Cork. She was refloated and resumed her voyage.
Modeste et Marie Anne	France	The schooner struck the Wolf Rock, Cornwall, United Kingdom and sank. Her crew were rescued. She was on a voyage from Newport, Monmouthshire, United Kingdom to Bordeaux, Gironde.
Mont Valerien	France	The ship sprang a leak and foundered in the Mediterranean Sea off Málaga, Spain. Her crew survived. She was on a voyage from Cardiff, Glamorgan, United Kingdom to Bône, Algeria.
Quevedo	France	The steamship collided with the steamship Cald (France) and sank at Phillippeville, Algeria. Quevedo was on a voyage from Phillippeville to Antwerp, Belgium.
Rive Clyde	United Kingdom	The ship ran aground in the Oste. She was on a voyage from Iquique, Chile to Hamburg, Germany.
Urania	United States	The 80-ton schooner departed Kodiak, Department of Alaska, bound for San Francisco, California, with 13 people and a cargo of furs aboard and disappeared without trace.

== 30 December ==
List of shipwrecks: 30 December 1875
Ship	State	Description
Belgiano	France	The steamship was severely damaged by fire at Havre de Grâce, Seine-Inférieure.
Dante	United Kingdom	The steamship collided with the barque Gronsvaer (Norway) and sank off the Smalls Lighthouse, Cornwall with the loss of 23 of her 31 crew. Survivors were rescued by Gronsvaer. Dante was on a voyage from Liverpool, Lancashire to Bombay, India.
Emma	Germany	The barque departed from Bremen for the west coast of Africa. No further trace, presumed foundered with the loss of all hands.
Harraton	United Kingdom	The steamship ran aground at Ostend, West Flanders, Belgium. She was on a voyage from Ostend to Sunderland, County Durham. She was refloated and completed her voyage.
Kirk	United Kingdom	The ship ran aground and was severely damaged at Wells-next-the-Sea, Norfolk. She was on a voyage from Marseille, Bouches-du-Rhône, France to Wells-next-the-Sea.
Ouse	United Kingdom	The steamship ran aground on the Shipwash Sand, in the North Sea off the coast of Suffolk. She was on a voyage from Whitby, Yorkshire to London. She was refloated with the assistance of three smack and resumed her voyage.

== 31 December ==
List of shipwrecks: 31 December 1875
Ship	State	Description
Agnes	United Kingdom	The ship ran aground at the mouth of the River Ness. She was on a voyage from Rosario, Argentina to Inverness.
Ben Ledi, or Magdala	United Kingdom	The steamship was driven ashore at "Heraclita", Ottoman Empire.
Frank M. Fisher	United Kingdom	The ship was driven ashore 6 nautical miles (11 km) south of St. Bees Head, Cumberland. She was on a voyage from Pomaron, Portugal to Workington, Cumberland. She was refloated and taken in to Workington.
Harvest Queen	United States	The ship collided with the steamship Adriatic (United Kingdom) and sank in the St George's Channel with the loss of all hands.
Helen	Denmark	The schooner was driven ashore and wrecked west of Burntisland, Fife, United Kingdom.
Mecklenburgs Hauswirthe	Germany	The ship was driven ashore on Hallands Väderö, Sweden. She was on a voyage from Hull, Yorkshire, United Kingdom to Copenhagen, Denmark. She was refloated and resumed her voyage.
Mount Royal	United Kingdom	The ship was wrecked on Barra, Outer Hebrides. Her crew were rescued. She was on a voyage from Sandy Hook, New Jersey, United States to Glasgow, Renfrewshire.
Panaghia Kimzia	Greece	The ship was driven ashore at "Niriophito", Ottoman Empire.
Sarah Jane	United Kingdom	The ship was wrecked at Cantick Head, Orkney Islands. Her crew survived. She was on a voyage from Portmadoc, Caernarfonshire to Macduff, Aberdeenshire.

== Unknown date ==
List of shipwrecks: Unknown date in December 1875
Ship	State	Description
Abby M. Heath	United States	The fishing schooner was abandoned on the passage from the Banks. Crew saved.
Admiral Devaux	France	The ship was wrecked in the Strait of Sunda. She was on a voyage from Pazhou, China to London, United Kingdom.
Advance	United Kingdom	The schooner was abandoned in the Mediterranean Sea north of Mazagan, Morocco. Her crew were rescued on 4 December by the schooner Tvava (Denmark).
Annie	United Kingdom	The ship was abandoned in the Atlantic Ocean.
Ann Richardson	United Kingdom	The ship was driven ashore at Alexandroupoli, Kingdom of Greece. She was refloated and towed in to the Dardanelles.
Burgermeister Schwing	Germany	The ship was sunk by ice at "Palmerort". She was refloated on 2 January 1876 with assistance from the steamship Seguens (Germany) and taken in to Stralsund.
Boal	(France) Senegal	The coaster was wrecked at Saint-Louis.
Eagle	United Kingdom	The barque foundered at sea before 4 December. Her crew were rescued by the steamship Ambriz (United Kingdom).
Eliza Jane	United Kingdom	The brig was abandoned in the North Sea (55°03′N 1°00′E). Her crew were rescued by the barque Commodore (United Kingdom). Eliza Jane was on a voyage from Sunderland, County Durham to Rochester, Kent.
Emma	United Kingdom	The Thames barge sank at Blackwall, Middlesex. She was refloated on 16 December and taken in to London.
Esperanza	Spain	The ship was wrecked on Tybee Island, Georgia, United States before 7 December. She was on a voyage from Puerto Rico to Savannah, Georgia.
Fairy Queen	Victoria	The ship was wrecked in the Exmouth Gulf. Her crew were rescued.
Henrietta	Netherlands	The ship collided with another vessel and was abandoned before 16 December. Her crew were rescued by Bounty (United Kingdom). Henrietta was on a voyage from "Monte Christo" to Falmouth, Cornwall.
Hermann	Germany	The schooner was driven ashore on Skagen, Denmark and was abandoned by her crew. She was on a voyage from Hull, Yorkshire, United Kingdom to Lübeck.
Hopewell	(Dominion of Newfoundland) Newfoundland Colony	The ship was wrecked with the loss of seven of the eight people on board. She was on a voyage from Saint John's to Harbour Grace, Nova Scotia, Canada.
BAP India	Portuguese Navy	The man-of-war was discovered in distress off Heraklion, Crete by the steamship Conrad (Netherlands). She was towed for 400 nautical miles (740 km) to a safe port.
J. J. Bernard	United States	The ship was wrecked on the coast of San Domingo before 20 December. She was on a voyage from Saint Thomas, Virgin Islands to New York.
Kitty Coburn	Victoria	The ship was wrecked at Cape Leeuwin, Western Australia.
L. J Westaway	Canada	The ship was driven ashore at Bridgeport, Connecticut. She was on a voyage from Liverpool, Lancashire, United Kingdom to Charlottetown, Prince Edward Island.
Magic	United Kingdom	The brigantine foundered in the North Sea off the Norfolk coast with the loss of all hands.
Merope	Greece	The ship was wrecked at Carloforte, Italy.
Nellie Cushing	United States	The schooner foundered in the Bay of Biscay. Her crew were rescued by the brigantine Glendale (United States).
Paciolince	Russia	The ship collided with the steamship Liguria (Italy) and sank. Five of her ten crew got abouard Liguria, the others were reported missing. Paciolence was on a voyage from Marianople to Cette, Hérault, France.
Phoebe Jane	(Dominion of Newfoundland) Newfoundland Colony	The ship was wrecked on the coast of Newfoundland with the loss of two lives.
Queen of the Lakes	United Kingdom	The ship was abandoned at sea before 12 December. Her crew were rescued by the steamship Denmark (United Kingdom). She was on a voyage from Moulmein, Burma to a British port.
Queen of the Fleet	United Kingdom	The barque was abandoned in the Atlantic Ocean before 6 December. Her crew were rescued. She was on a voyage from Barrow-in-Furness, Cumberland to Miramichi, New Brunswick, Canada.
Raymond	United Kingdom	The ship ran aground at Adelaide, South Australia.
Sparkenhoe	United Kingdom	The full-rigged ship was abandoned in the Atlantic Ocean before 16 December.
Sumatra	United Kingdom	The ship caught fire in the Atlantic Ocean on or before 7 December. Her 25 crew were rescued by the barque Minnie Gray (United Kingdom). Sumatra was on a voyage from Calcutta, India to Dundee, Forfarshire.
Thomas Walt	United States	The schooner was abandoned at sea. Her crew were rescued.
Trofast	Flag unknown	The ship foundered in the North Sea. Wreckage washed ashore at Blakeney, Norfolk, United Kingdom.
Vidar	Norway	The ship foundered in the North Sea. Wreckage washed ashore at Lossiemouth, Lothian, United Kingdom.
Water Witch	(Dominion of Newfoundland) Newfoundland Colony	The ship was wrecked on the coast of Newfoundland with the loss of eleven of the 24 people on board.
William Edgard	France	The ship was driven ashore and wrecked near Quilimane, Mozambique.
Windward	United States	The clipper was wrecked on Whidbey Island, Washington. She was on a voyage from Seattle, Washington to San Francisco, California.
