= Edward Fanshawe =

Royal Navy Admiral (1814–1906)

Admiral Sir Edward Fanshawe GCB
- Born: 27 November 1814; Stoke, Devon
- Died: 21 October 1906 (aged 91)
- Military career
- Allegiance: United Kingdom
- Branch: Royal Navy
- Rank: Admiral
- Commands: HMS Cruizer; HMS Daphne; HMS Cossack; HMS Hastings; HMS Centurion; HMS Trafalgar; North American Station; Royal Naval College, Greenwich; Portsmouth Command
- Conflicts: Oriental Crisis
- Awards: Knight Grand Cross of the Order of the Bath

Admiral Sir Edward Gennys Fanshawe, GCB (27 November 1814 – 21 October 1906) was a Royal Navy officer who went on to be Commander-in-Chief, Portsmouth. He was a gifted amateur artist, with much of his work in the National Maritime Museum, London.

== Naval career ==
Born the eldest surviving son of General Sir Edward Fanshawe, and the nephew of Admiral Sir Arthur Fanshawe, Fanshawe was educated at the Royal Naval Academy, Portsmouth where he came second from the top in a very talented year and was commended for both his artistic and writing ability. Fanshawe joined the Royal Navy in 1828. During the Oriental Crisis of 1840 he took part in the capture of Acre. He was subsequently given command of HMS Cruizer and then HMS Daphne.

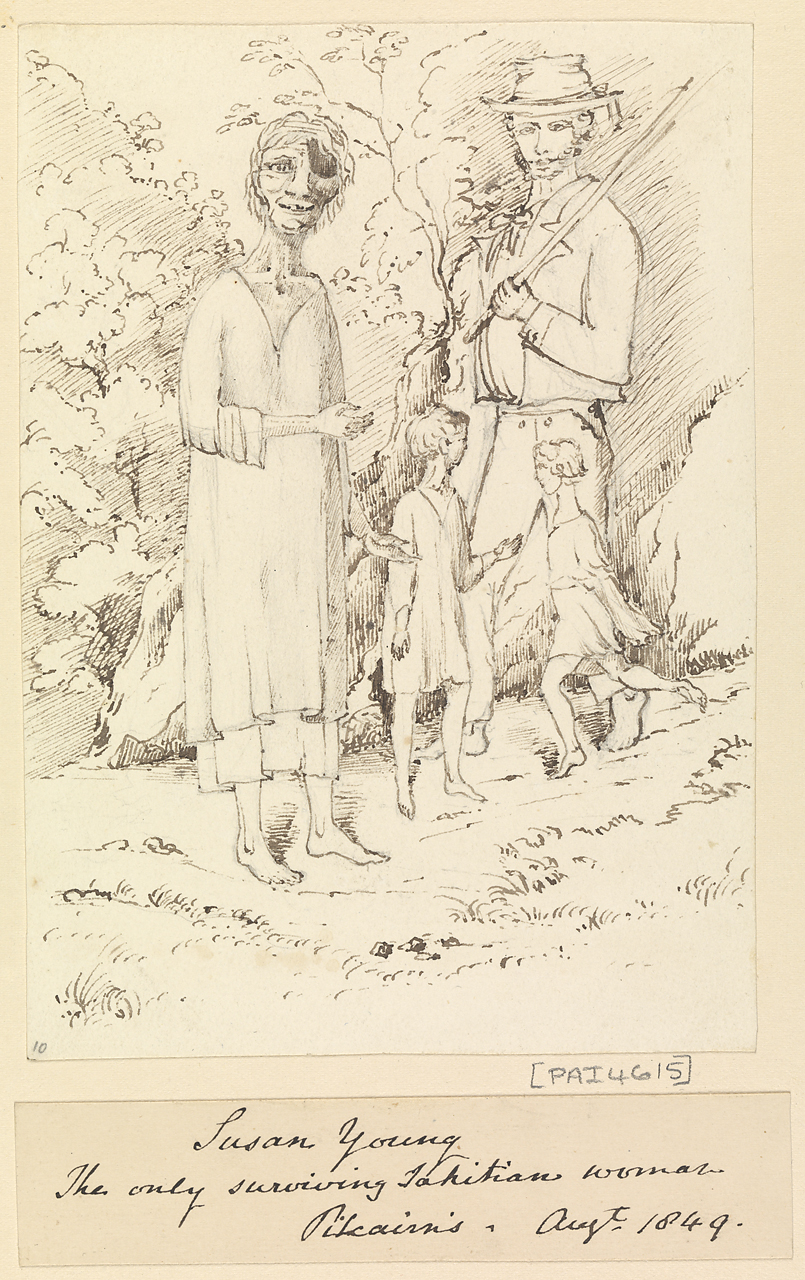
August 1849 Edward Gennys Fanshawe sketch of Susan Young, the only surviving Tahitian woman on Pitcairn Island

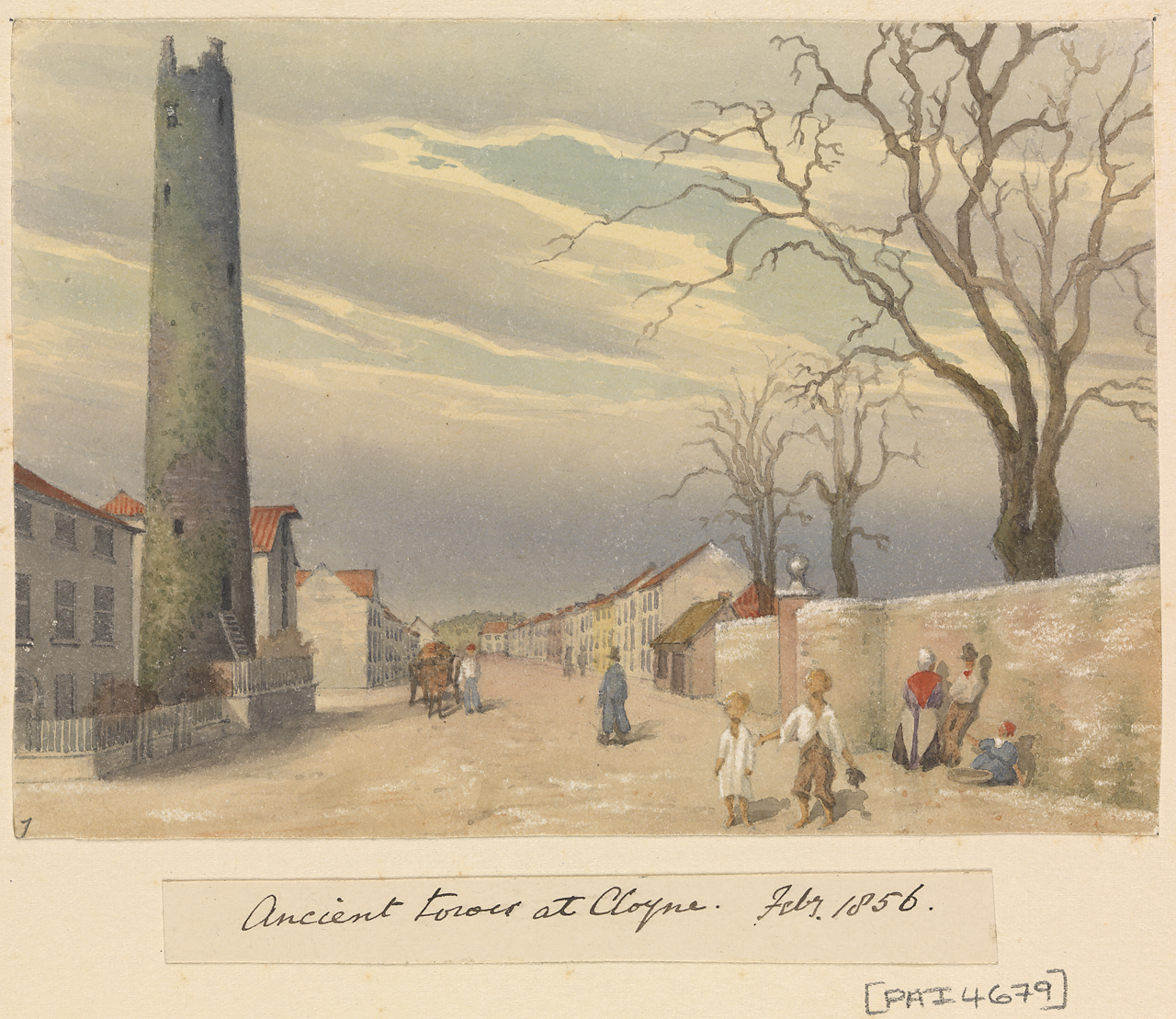
Ancient tower at Cloyne in County Cork. Painted by Fanshawe in 1856.

He took part in the Crimean War as captain of HMS Cossack. Later he commanded HMS Hastings, HMS Centurion and then HMS Trafalgar. He suffered some health problems from the 1850s, which curtailed his Mediterranean command of HMS Centurion.

He was made Superintendent of Chatham Dockyard in 1861, Third Naval Lord in 1865 and Superintendent of Malta Dockyard in 1868. He went on to be Commander-in-Chief, North American Station in 1870, Admiral President of the Royal Naval College, Greenwich in 1875 and Commander-in-Chief, Portsmouth in 1878. He retired in 1879.

From the early 1850s he and his family lived at Rutland Gate in London. He later moved to 63 Eaton Square and finally to 75 Cromwell Road in Kensington, where he died on Trafalgar Day 1906.

== Family ==
Fanshawe's marriage to Jane Cardwell took place in early 1843; she was the sister of Edward (later Lord) Cardwell, a notable politician and, as Secretary of State for War under William Gladstone in the 1860s, instigator of the 'Cardwell Reforms' of the British Army.

They had four sons and a daughter, including:

- Lieutenant-Colonel Edward Cardwell Fanshawe, of the Royal Engineers, who married in 1900 Alice Drew, daughter of Colonel George Drew, CB.
- Admiral of the Fleet Sir Arthur Dalrymple Fanshawe (1847–1936), whose son Guy Dalrymple Fanshawe also became a Royal Naval Captain.
- Alice Fanshawe

== See also ==
- O'Byrne, William Richard (1849). "Fanshawe, Edward Gennys" . A Naval Biographical Dictionary . John Murray – via Wikisource.

Military offices
Preceded by Charles Frederick	Third Naval Lord; 1865–1866	Succeeded by Henry Seymour
Preceded by Henry Kellett	Admiral Superintendent, Malta Dockyard; 1868–1870	Succeeded by Astley Key
Preceded by Sir George Wellesley	Commander-in-Chief, North America and West Indies Station; 1870–1873	Succeeded by Sir George Wellesley
Preceded by Sir Astley Key	President, Royal Naval College, Greenwich; 1875–1878	Succeeded by Sir Charles Shadwell
Preceded by Sir George Elliot	Commander-in-Chief, Portsmouth; 1878–1879	Succeeded by Sir Alfred Ryder
