= Robert Smart (Royal Navy officer) =

Royal Navy Admiral (1796–1874)

Admiral Sir Robert Smart KCB KH
- Born: September 1796
- Died: 10 September 1874 (aged 77–78)
- Military career
- Allegiance: United Kingdom
- Branch: Royal Navy
- Rank: Admiral
- Commands: HMS Howe; HMS Impregnable; HMS Collingwood; HMS Indefatigable; Channel Squadron; Mediterranean Fleet
- Conflicts: Crimean War
- Awards: Knight Commander of the Order of the Bath; Knight Commander of the Royal Guelphic Order

Admiral Sir Robert Smart, KCB, KH (September 1796 – 10 September 1874) was a Royal Navy officer who went on to be Commander-in-Chief, Mediterranean Fleet.

== Naval career ==
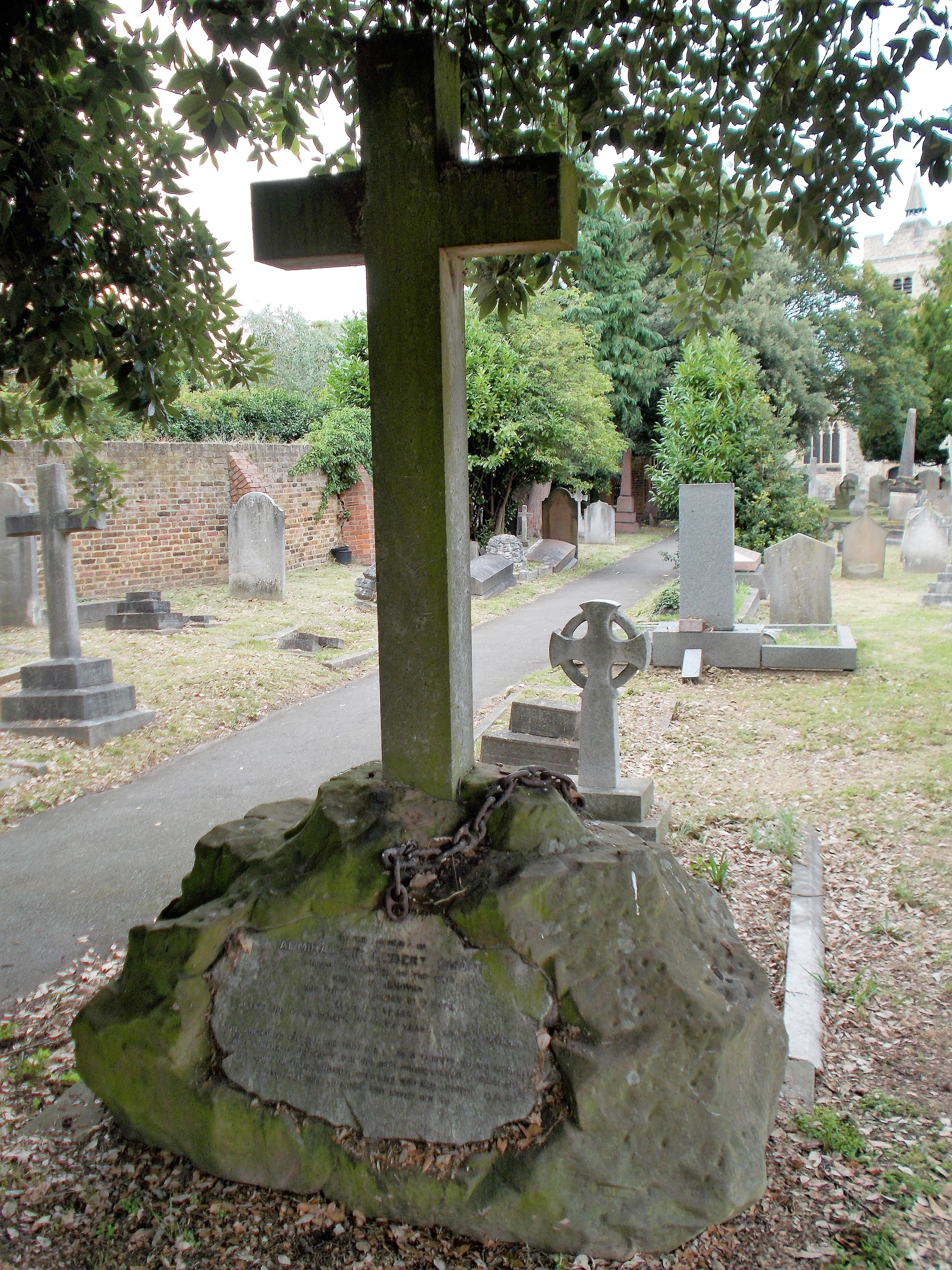
Grave of Admiral Robert Smart in Old Chiswick Cemetery

Smart joined the Royal Navy and was promoted to lieutenant in 1820. Promoted to captain in 1837, he took command, successively, of HMS Howe, HMS Impregnable, HMS Collingwood and HMS Indefatigable. He became captain superintendent of Pembroke Dockyard in 1854.

Promoted to rear admiral in July 1857, he became Commander-in-Chief, Channel Squadron in 1861 and Commander-in-Chief, Mediterranean Fleet in April 1863. He was promoted to vice admiral in December 1863 and was required to assess the damage caused by the volcanic disturbances in the neighbourhood of Santorini in Spring 1866 before handing over his command in April 1866.

He was promoted to full admiral in 1869 and retired the following year.

== Family ==
Smart's daughter, Isabella Dora Smart, married first J. H. Anderson; and after his death she remarried in August 1902 Henry Francis Wilson, CMG, Colonial Secretary to the Orange River Colony.

== See also ==
- O'Byrne, William Richard (1849). "Smart, Robert" . A Naval Biographical Dictionary . John Murray – via Wikisource.

Military offices
Preceded by Sir Robert Stopford	Commander-in-Chief, Channel Fleet; 1861–1863	Succeeded by Sir Sydney Dacres
Preceded by Sir William Martin	Commander-in-Chief, Mediterranean Fleet; 1863–1866	Succeeded by Lord Clarence Paget
