= Vanguard-class ship of the line =

Class of British second-rate ships of the line

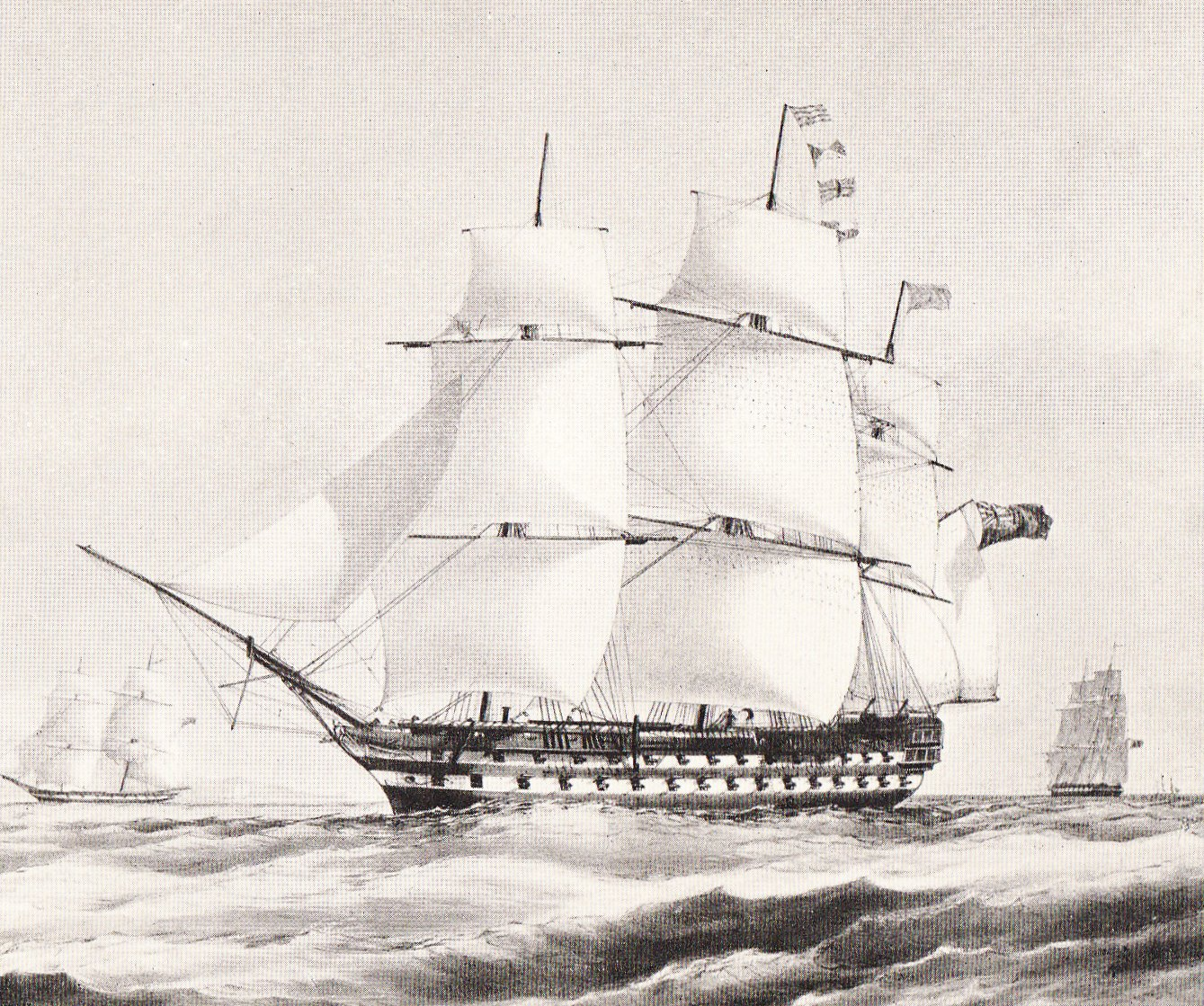
- HMS Collingwood

Class overview
- Name: Vanguard class
- Operators: Royal Navy
- Preceded by: Canopus-class
- Succeeded by: None
- In service: 25 August 1835 - 1929
- Planned: 14
- Completed: 9

General characteristics
- Type: 80-gun, second-rate, Ship of the line
- Tons burthen: 2,589 38/94 (bm)
- Length: 190 ft (57.9 m) (gun deck)
- Beam: 56 ft 9 in (17.3 m)
- Depth of hold: 23 ft 4 in (7.1 m)
- Sail plan: Full-rigged ship
- Complement: 720
- Armament: 80 muzzle-loading, smoothbore guns: Lower gun deck: 28 × 32 pdr guns + 2 × 68 pdr carronades; Upper gun deck: 26 × 32 pdr guns + 2 × 68 pdr carronades; Forecastle & Quarterdeck: 22 × 32 pdr guns

The Vanguard-class ships of the line were a class of two-deck 80-gun second rates, designed for the Royal Navy by Sir William Symonds, of which nine were completed as sailing ships of the line, although another two of these were completed as (and others converted into) steam warships.

They were originally planned as 78-gun third rates. Two ships were ordered in 1832 and another two in 1833, although one of the latter was intended to be a rebuilding of the second rate Union, and this was subsequently cancelled. At this point the design was modified and they were re-designated as 80-gun second rates. Another ship was ordered to this design in 1838, another seven in 1839 (of which two were subsequently re-ordered three months later as 90-gun ships to a new design - the Albion and Aboukir) and another two in 1840. Two of the above ships were re-ordered and completed as steam battleships - Majestic and Irresistible. A final ship to this design, the Brunswick, was ordered in 1844 but in 1847 she was re-ordered to a modified design.

== Characteristics of Symondite warships ==
Warships designed to the ideas of Captain Sir William Symonds (1782–1856) are known as Symondite warships, although the adjective has no official use as terminology. His intention was to give the Royal Navy an advantage in speed (under certain weather conditions), allowing it to force action.

Symondite warships were very broad, and had a sharp V-shaped hull-form. (Preceding designs had a U-shaped hull form.)

- Their wide beam gave them very high stability, which allowed them to carry nearly twice the power of sail as vessels of the old type. Unfortunately the Surveyor's department was understaffed, with the result that their stability was over-done. Symondite warships rolled quickly, heavily and sometimes unevenly. This made them poor gun platforms. The rapid rolling also caused the rigging to wear out more quickly than on previous designs.
- Because Symondite warships got their stability from their great beam, they did not need to carry so much iron ballast as previous designs.
- Their V-shaped hull with its steeply rising floors was inconvenient for carrying stores.
- They had higher and wider gun decks than preceding designs. This gave the gun crews more space to work in, improving efficiency. It also helped their sailing performance, because they were carrying fewer guns for their size.
- They had an excessively raked stern. In some ships, modifications to their sterns to remedy defects in the original design left "the stern timbers badly arranged, weakly supported and held together with iron straps." The Symondite stern "lacked the defensive strength of the true round stern. There was simply too much glass to offer any protection to the crews of the stern battery in action."

Symondite warships were very sensitive to how they were stowed. If trimmed carefully, they were fast in moderate winds, thought they did not do as well as preceding designs in head seas, or rough seas.

Compared with previous designs, Symondite warships required 19% more loads of wood and 30% more man-hours to build.

Some of the Symondite warships were converted to steam in the 1850s (though not Vanguard). Their V-shaped hull made it difficult to add a steam engine and boilers and to store coal. The extra weight was low in the ship, exacerbating their excess stability, which made their rolling even worse than before. (In fairness, at the time they were designed, it was never anticipated that they would be converted to steam.)

== Ships ==
- HMS Vanguard

Builder: Pembroke Dockyard
Ordered: 23 June 1832
Launched: 25 August 1835
Fate: Broken up, 1875

- HMS Collingwood

Builder: Pembroke Dockyard
Ordered: 23 June 1832
Launched: 17 August 1841
Fate: Sold, 1867

- HMS Goliath

Builder: Chatham Dockyard
Ordered: 7 October 1833
Launched: 25 July 1842
Fate: Burnt, 1875

- HMS Superb

Builder: Pembroke Dockyard
Ordered: 15 June 1838
Launched: 6 September 1842
Fate: Broken up, 1869

- HMS Meeanee

Builder: Bombay Dockyard
Ordered: 12 March 1839 (as Madras)
Launched: 11 November 1848
Fate: Broken up, 1906

- HMS Centurion

Builder: Pembroke Dockyard
Ordered: 18 March 1839
Launched: 2 May 1844
Fate: Sold, 1870

- HMS Lion

Builder: Pembroke Dockyard
Ordered: 12 March 1840
Launched: 29 July 1847
Fate: Sold, 1905

- HMS Colossus

Builder: Pembroke Dockyard
Ordered: 18 March 1839
Launched: 1 June 1848
Fate: Sold, 1867

- HMS Mars

Builder: Chatham Dockyard
Ordered: 18 March 1839
Launched: 1 July 1848
Fate: Sold, 1929
