= 32-pounder 56 cwt =

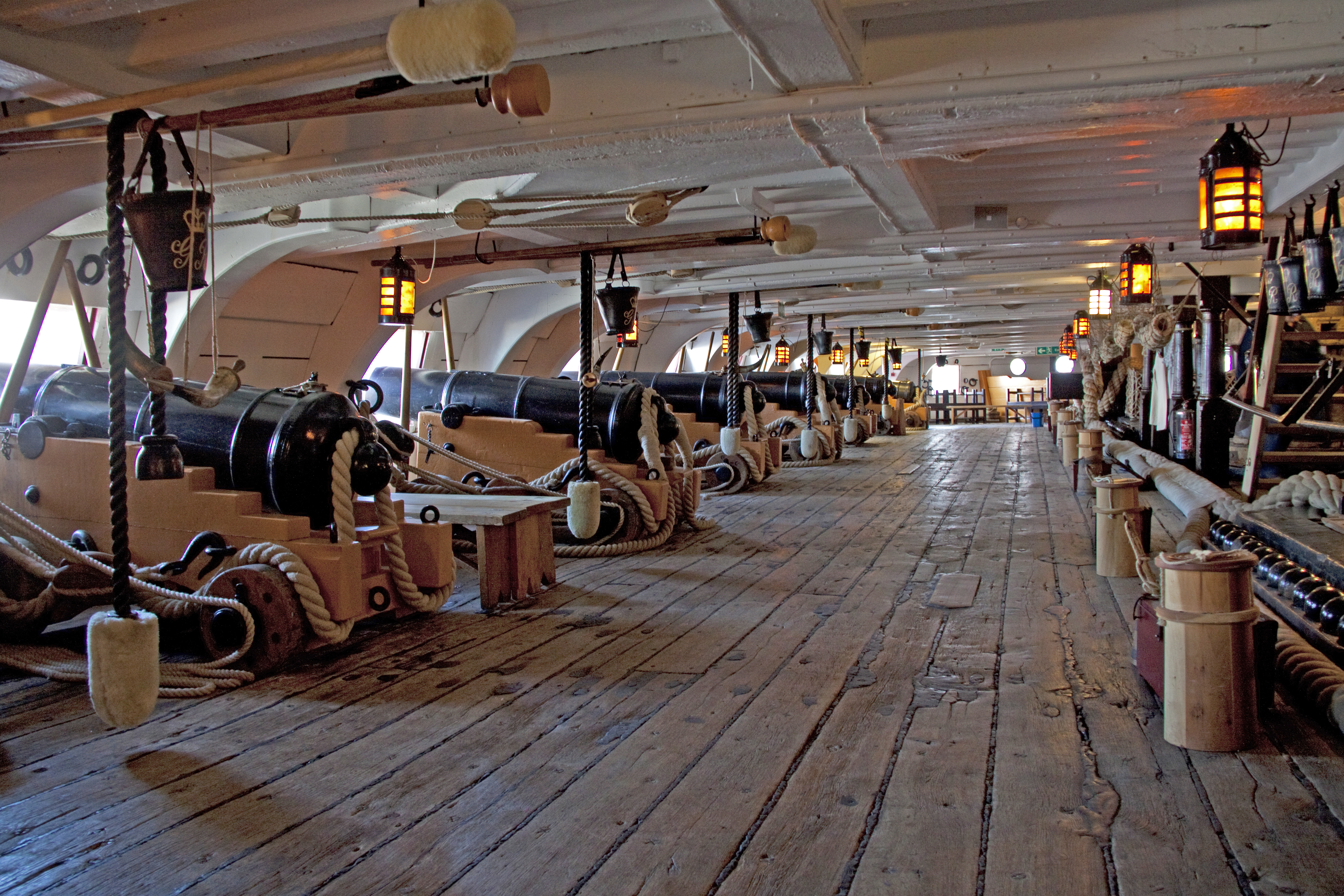
- 32-pounder 56 cwt guns (replicas) on HMS Victory's gundeck
- Type: Naval gun, coast defense gun
- Place of origin: United Kingdom

Service history
- In service: 1790s-after 1865
- Used by: United Kingdom
- Wars: French Revolutionary wars, Napoleonic Wars, Crimean War

Production history
- Designer: Thomas Blomefield
- Designed: 1790s
- Produced: 1790s-1830s
- No. built: in excess of 3,694

Specifications
- Mass: 56 cwt
- Length: 9.5 feet (2.9 m)
- Shell: Solid Shot
- Shell weight: 32 pounds (15 kg)

The 32-pounder 56 cwt cannon was an artillery piece designed and used by the British Armed Forces in the late 18th and early 19th centuries. It was by far the most common 32-pounder used by the Royal Navy in the Napoleonic Wars, with 1,961 guns being recorded as in use and 1,733 being in storage at the end of March 1857. The cannon was a smoothbore muzzle-loading gun, being 56 long cwt (2,800 kg), and firing projectiles of 32 lb (15 kg). Sir Thomas Blomefield designed the cannon in the late 1780s and early 1790s as part of his system of gun construction. It was the heaviest cannon used by ships of the Royal Navy from the 1790s to the late 1830s, and it was used on the lower decks of ships of the line such as HMS Victory.
