= Telescoping (mechanics) =

Movement of one part sliding out from another

Showing the telescopic principle, an object collapsed (above) and extended (below), providing more reach.

Telescoping in mechanics describes the movement of one part sliding out from another, lengthening an object (such as a telescope or the lift arm of an aerial work platform) from its rest state. Manually extended telescoping devices are common in modern products, for example they are used in umbrellas, selfie sticks, pop up canopy shelters, and (to extend handles) luggage. In heavy equipment, extension can be achieved by a hydraulics, but pulleys are generally used for simpler designs such as extendable ladders and amateur radio antennas.

== See also ==
- Telescoping bolt
- Telescopic cylinder
- Telescoping (rail cars)
