= In ordinary =

Term describing a ship placed out of service

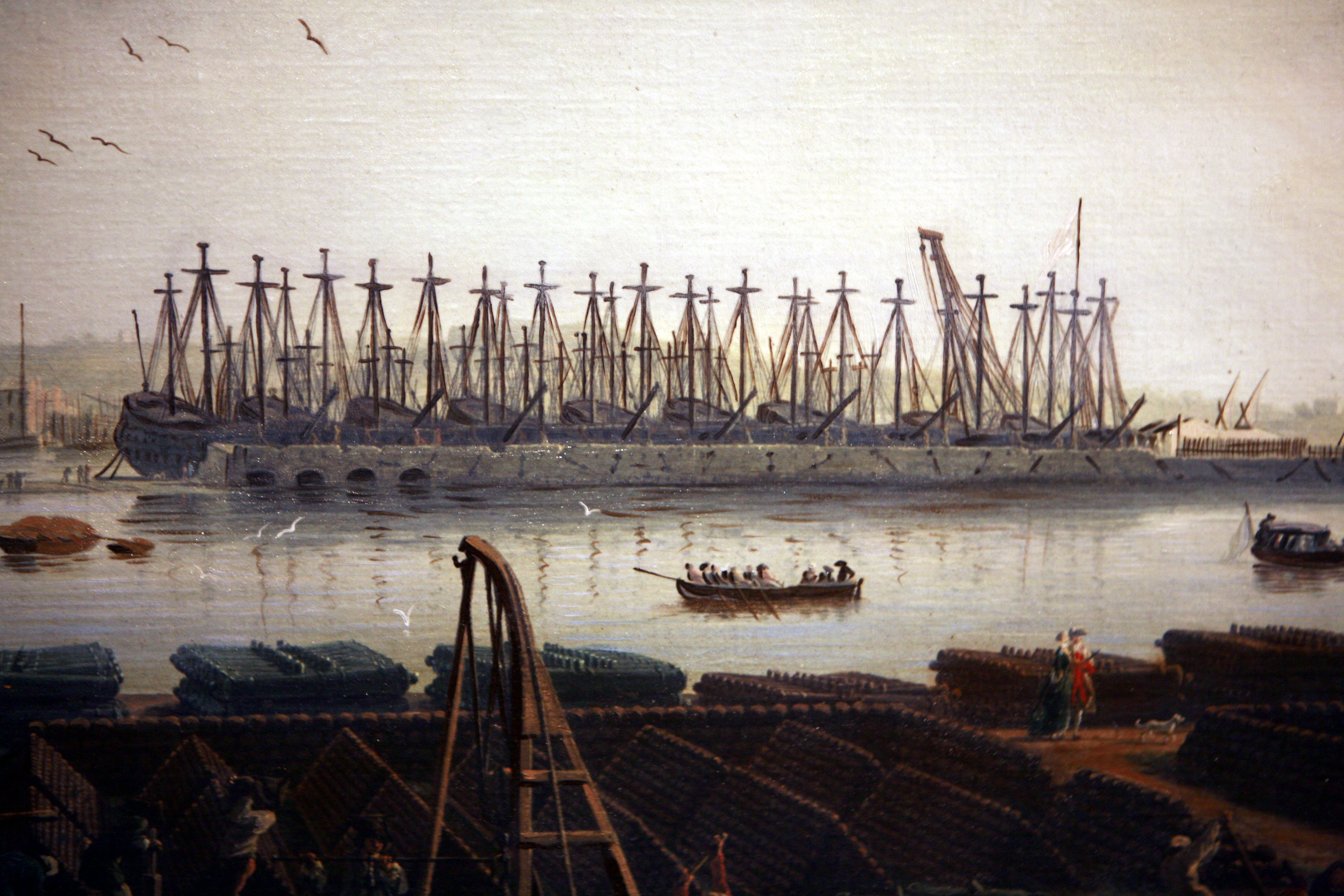
Detail of the view of Toulon in the Vues des ports de France (1754) by Claude Joseph Vernet, showing part of the French fleet stored in ordinary in the military harbour.

In ordinary is an English phrase with multiple meanings. In relation to the Royal Household and public officials more generally, it indicates that a position is a permanent one (in contrast to positions that are extraordinary). In naval matters, vessels "in ordinary" (from the 17th century) are those out of service for repair or maintenance, a meaning coming over time to cover a reserve fleet or "mothballed" ships.

== History of use ==
The term arose from the development of three separate financial Estimates for Royal Navy expenditure; the "Ordinary" Estimate which covered routine expenses such as the maintenance of dockyards and naval establishments, the "Sea Service" Estimate which supported ships and crew at or capable of going to sea, and the Estimate for "Extraordinary Repair" which met the cost of major rebuilding or refit. A ship that was no longer required for active service, or was too decrepit to remain at sea, would be transferred from the Sea Service to the Ordinary Estimate, and would be left "in Ordinary" until returned to duty or broken up.

Ships could remain in Ordinary for lengthy periods, including for example HMS Royal William which spent 38 years in Ordinary between its launch in 1719 and first active service in 1757. Poorly maintained, vessels in Ordinary were susceptible to dry rot and were routinely crewed by pensioned or disabled sailors with little interest in returning to sea service. During the War of the Austrian Succession from 1739 to 1745, a review of ships in Ordinary revealed that at least half of their warrant officers were too old or sickly to serve outside their mothballed vessels. Improvements were made from 1752 when Admiral George Anson, the newly appointed First Lord of the Admiralty, initiated reforms of royal dockyards with the intention of maximising the number of vessels capable of being put to sea at any time. However, most of Anson's reforms were opposed by the Navy Board, which had direct responsibility for dockyard management and felt that Admiralty interference was a rebuke to its authority.

In 1755 the Board of Admiralty conducted a further review of vessels in Ordinary. The review identified Plymouth Dockyard as the worst performer in ship maintenance and repair, with some ships untouched since 1745. Plymouth Dockyard's Master Attendant and Clerk of the Survey were dismissed, a new dock and slipway were constructed, and dock workers and ship's crews were required to work longer hours to ensure that ships held in Ordinary were capable of being sailed. To maximise resources, construction of new vessels was also transferred to private shipyards. Lastly, the Admiralty successfully petitioned the Privy Council to remove the Royal Navy's Surveyor, Joseph Allin, who had held the post for forty years and was now "disordered in his senses."

These various efforts were successful in improving the quality of vessels held in Ordinary, such that more than 200 ships were in commission or capable of being sailed by the end of 1755 compared with 97 in 1753.

Royal Navy officers ashore on half-pay were also considered "in Ordinary" and paid from that Estimate.

== Crown servants ==
In relation particularly to the staff of the British Royal Household, and more generally to those employed by the Crown, it is used as a suffix showing that the appointment is to the regular staff, for example a priest or chaplain-in-ordinary, or a physician-in-ordinary, being a cleric or doctor in regular attendance. The usage goes back to the 17th century. See for example:

- Principal Painter in Ordinary
- Lords of Appeal in Ordinary
- Chaplain Extraordinary

== Bibliography ==
- Baugh, Daniel A. (1965). British Naval Administration in the Age of Walpole. Princeton University Press. OCLC 729683642.
- Middleton, Richard (1988). "Naval administration in the age of Pitt and Anson, 1755-1763". In Black, Jeremy; Woodfine, Philip (eds.). The British Navy and the Use of Naval Power in the Eighteenth Century. Leicester University Press. ISBN 0718513088.
