= List of shipwrecks in July 1861 =

The list of shipwrecks in July 1861 includes ships sunk, foundered, grounded, or otherwise lost during July 1861.

== 1 July ==
List of shipwrecks: 1 July 1861
Ship	State	Description
Cleopatra	Unknown	Carrying a cargo of lumber from Puget Sound in Washington Territory to San Francisco, California, the bark burned in the Pacific Ocean off the coast of California.

== 2 July ==
List of shipwrecks: 2 July 1861
Ship	State	Description
Cataline	Confederate States of America	The 391-ton sidewheel paddle steamer burned at Fort Monroe, Virginia.
Stad Vlissingen	Netherlands	The ship foundered off Loosduinen, South Holland with the loss of all but one of her crew. She was on a voyage from the River Tyne to Rotterdam, South Holland.

== 3 July ==
List of shipwrecks: 3 July 1861
Ship	State	Description
Anne	United Kingdom	The whaler was crushed by ice and sank in the Davis Straits. Her crew survived.
Golden Rocket	United States	American Civil War: The 607- or 690-ton bark was on a voyage from Havana to Cienfuegos, Cuba, when the merchant raider CSS Sumter (Confederate States Navy) captured her in the Caribbean Sea off Cape Corrientes, Cuba, and burned her 10 to 12 nautical miles (18.5 to 22.2 km) west-southwest of Isla de Pinos.
Victory	United Kingdom	Flywheel from the wreck of Victory in the surf at low tide on Victory Beach, 11 September 2009. Soon after departing Port Chalmers, New Zealand, the steamer was wrecked at 45.8425°S 170.7321°E on the southern end of a beach that became known as Victory Beach.

== 4 July ==
List of shipwrecks: 4 July 1861
Ship	State	Description
Edward Hill	United States	The barque was severely damaged by fire at Boston, Massachusetts.
Lumdano	United Kingdom	The ship caught fire and sank at Boston. She was on a voyage from Trinidad de Cuba, Cuba to Queenstown, County Cork. The severely damaged vessel was refloated on 19 July.
Mystery	United States	The barque caught fire and sank at Boston. The severely damaged vessel was refloated on 19 July.
Quindoro	United Kingdom	The schooner was destroyed by fire at Boston. She was on a voyage from Trinidad to Cork.

== 5 July ==
List of shipwrecks: 5 July 1861
Ship	State	Description
Live Yankee	United States	The extreme clipper was wrecked at "St. Cosmell", Galicia, Spain with the loss of seven of her crew. At least thirteen crew survived. She was on a voyage from Liverpool, Lancashire, United Kingdom to Kurrachee, India.
Robert	United Kingdom	The ship was driven ashore and wrecked on Seskar, Russia.

== 6 July ==
List of shipwrecks: 6 July 1861
Ship	State	Description
HMS Aboukir	Royal Navy	The Albion-class ship of the line ran aground on Yeusta Skerry. Subsequently refloated, repaired and returned to service.

== 8 July ==
List of shipwrecks: 8 July 1861
Ship	State	Description
Berlin City	United States	The 74-ton sidewheel paddle steamer was stranded at Oshkosh, Wisconsin.
Iola Wyllie	United States	The barque collided with the steamship Beaver (United Kingdom and sank in the English Channel off Dungeness, Kent, United Kingdom. Iola Wyllie was on a voyage from Bordeaux, Gironde, France to Husum, Sweden.

== 9 July ==
List of shipwrecks: 9 July 1861
Ship	State	Description
Tom Hicks	Confederate States of America	American Civil War, Union blockade: The 27-ton schooner, bound for Port Lavaca, Texas, with a cargo of lumber, was captured and destroyed in the Gulf of Mexico off Galveston, Texas, by the armed screw steamer USS South Carolina (United States Navy).
Wonder	United Kingdom	The paddle steamer struck a floating log in the River Thames at Greenwich, Kent and sank. Her crew survived. She was on a voyage from London to the Nore.

== 10 July ==
List of shipwrecks: 10 July 1861
Ship	State	Description
Beatrice	United States	The ship departed from Cardiff, Glamorgan, United Kingdom for Hong Kong. No further trace, presumed foundered with the loss of all hands.
Nymph	United Kingdom	The brigantine was driven ashore in Loch Inshart. She was on a voyage from Loch Carron to the River Tyne.
Testimonial	United Kingdom	The barque ran aground off Ras Hafun, Africa. She was on a voyage from South Shields, County Durham to Aden. She was refloated but was consequently beached between Ras Hafun and Cape Guardafui, where she was wrecked and plundered by the local inhabitants. Six crew were rescued, the remainder were reported missing.

== 11 July ==
List of shipwrecks: 11 July 1861
Ship	State	Description
Randal S. Smith	United States	Carrying a cargo of coal, the schooner was wrecked on Block Island off the coast of Rhode Island.

== 12 July ==
List of shipwrecks: 12 July 1861
Ship	State	Description
Bommelenvord	Flag unknown	The ship struck a rock 3 nautical miles (5.6 km) from Swatow, China and was wrecked. She was on a voyage from Swatow to Shanghai, China.
Protezione	Italy	The barque was run down and sunk east of Gibraltar by the barque Nestor (United States). Her crew were rescued by Nestor. Protezione was on a voyage from Brăila, Ottoman Empire to Falmouth, Cornwall, United Kingdom.

== 13 July ==
List of shipwrecks: 13 July 1861
Ship	State	Description
Amy	United States	The ship was driven ashore in Chesapeake Bay.
George Smith	United Kingdom	The ship ran aground on the Mittelgrund. She was on a voyage from Kronstadt, Russia to London. She was refloated with assistance from the steamship Scandinavian (Flag Unknown).
Louise Cecilie	Denmark	The ship was driven ashore at Orfordness, Suffolk, United Kingdom. She was on a voyage from London to South Shields, County Durham, United Kingdom. She was refloated and resumed her voyage.

== 14 July ==
List of shipwrecks: 14 July 1861
Ship	State	Description
Sir Robert Preston	United Kingdom	The schooner was driven ashore at Cambois, Northumberland. She was on a voyage from South Shields, County Durham to Perth. She was refloated and taken in to Blyth, Northumberland.

== 15 July ==
List of shipwrecks: 15 July 1861
Ship	State	Description
Java	United Kingdom	The ship foundered off the Copeland Islands, County Down. Her crew were rescued. She was on a voyage from Liverpool, Lancashire to Anstruther, Fife.
Lady Sarah	United Kingdom	The ship was wrecked near Burgeo, Newfoundland, British North America. She was on a voyage from Cartagena, Spain to Quebec City, Province of Canada, British North America.

== 16 July ==
List of shipwrecks: 16 July 1861
Ship	State	Description
Linwood	United States	Carrying a cargo of coffee from Rio de Janeiro, Brazil, to New York City, the barque was wrecked on the coast of North Carolina 6 miles (10 km) north of Cape Hatteras, Confederate States of America. Her crew were rescued.

== 17 July ==
List of shipwrecks: 17 July 1861
Ship	State	Description
Blarney	United Kingdom	The yacht was run into and sunk by the steam yacht Empress (United Kingdom at Kingstown, County Dublin. Her crew survived.

== 18 July ==
List of shipwrecks: 18 July 1861
Ship	State	Description
Favorite	Confederate States of America	American Civil War, Union blockade: The schooner sank in the Potomac River at Piney Point, Maryland, either because she sprang a leak or because she collided with another vessel. She had been captured on 14 July in the Yeocomico River in Virginia by the gunboat USS Resolute, the sidewheel tug USS Yankee, and three boats from the sloop-of-war USS Pawnee (all United States Navy).
Janet	United Kingdom	The ship was wrecked on the west coast of Newfoundland, British North America. She was on a voyage from Cartagena, Spain to Quebec City, Province of Canada, British North America.
Mary	United Kingdom	The ship sprang a leak and was beached on the Cleness Sand, in the North Sea off the coast of Lincolnshire. She was refloated on 24 July and taken in to Grimsby, Lincolnshire.

== 19 July ==
List of shipwrecks: 19 July 1861
Ship	State	Description
Prerogative	United Kingdom	The ship ran aground and was wrecked near Hirtshals, Denmark. She was on a voyage from Gothenburg, Sweden to Sunderland, County Durham.

== 20 July ==
List of shipwrecks: 20 July 1861
Ship	State	Description
Crimean	Italy	The steamship ran aground on the Vado Shoal. She was on a voyage from Livorno to Naples. She was refloated the next day and put back to Livorno.
Ebenezer	United Kingdom	The brig was driven ashore at Margate, Kent. She was on a voyage from Hartlepool, County Durham to Shoreham-by-Sea, Sussex. She was refloated.
Falcon	United Kingdom	The brig sprang a leak and sank in the English Channel off Beachy Head, Sussex. Her crew were rescued. She was on a voyage from Newcastle upon Tyne, Northumberland to Brest, Finistère, France.
Medora	United States	The 101-ton sternwheel paddle steamer burned on the Ohio River at Jeffersonville, Indiana.
Penelope	United Kingdom	The ship sprang a leak and foundered in the North Sea 18 nautical miles (33 km) off Scarborough, Yorkshire. Her crew were rescued. She was on a voyage from Seaham, County Durham to London.

== 21 July ==
List of shipwrecks: 21 July 1861
Ship	State	Description
Admiral Lyons	United Kingdom	The ship caught fire at Bombay, India and was scuttled.
Eliza Stewart	United Kingdom	The brigantine sprang a leak and foundered off the mouth of the Humber. Her crew were rescued. She was on a voyage from Newcastle upon Tyne, Northumberland to Cádiz, Spain.
Prince Charlie	United Kingdom	The ship was destroyed by fire at Penang, Malaya.

== 23 July ==
List of shipwrecks: 23 July 1861
Ship	State	Description
Eagle	United Kingdom	The ship capsized off the mouth of the Humber with the loss of two of her three crew. She was on a voyage from Middlesbrough, Yorkshire to Boston or Spalding, Lincolnshire.
Favourite	United Kingdom	The schooner ran aground on the Cutler Sand, in the North Sea off the coast of Suffolk. She was on a voyage from Seaham, County Durham to Ipswich, Suffolk. She was refloated the next day and taken in to Harwich, Essex.
Glen	United States	American Civil War: The Barque was captured and burned by CSS Dixie (Confederate States Navy) off Florida.
Marea en Jeanette	Norway	The schooner was abandoned in the North Sea. Her crew were rescued by Charlotte (United Kingdom). Marea en Jeanette was on a voyage from Newcastle upon Tyne, Northumberland, United Kingdom to Christiania.

== 24 July ==
List of shipwrecks: 24 July 1861
Ship	State	Description
Eagle′s Wing	United States	The 409-ton steamer burned off Pawtuxet, Rhode Island.
Unidentified schooners and sloops	Confederate States of America	American Civil War, Union blockade: An expedition consisting of sailors in five launches from the steam frigate USS Minnesota and the armed tug USS Resolute (both United States Navy) and 300 Union Army soldiers aboard the vessel Fanny (United States) burned nine or ten schooners and sloops in the Back River in Virginia.

== 25 July ==
List of shipwrecks: 25 July 1861
Ship	State	Description
Algomah	United States	The 114-foot-9-inch (35 m), 269.14-gross register ton brig was reported sunk in Lake Michigan near Milwaukee, Wisconsin.
Fanny	United Kingdom	The ship foundered 40 nautical miles (74 km) north west of Vigo, Spain. Her crew were rescued. She was on a voyage from Cardiff, Glamorgan to Lisbon, Portugal.
St. Michel	France	The brig ran aground on the Holm Sand, in the North Sea off the coast of Suffolk, United Kingdom. Her eight crew were rescued by the Lowestoft Lifeboat. She was on a voyage from Kristiansand, Norway to Marans, Charente-Inférieure.

== 26 July ==
List of shipwrecks: 26 July 1861
Ship	State	Description
Fox	United Kingdom	The sloop sprang a leak and was beached at Ryhope, County Durham, where she was wrecked.

== 27 July ==
List of shipwrecks: 27 July 1861
Ship	State	Description
Joseph Maxwell	United States	American Civil War: The barque was captured by the privateer Sumter (Confederate States of America) off Porto Caballo, Venezuela and was run ashore east of Cienfuegos, Cuba. She was later refloated and taken in to Cienfuegos.

== 28 July ==
List of shipwrecks: 28 July 1861
Ship	State	Description
B. T. Martin	Confederate States of America	American Civil War, Union blockade: The brig, run aground by her crew on the coast of North Carolina near Cape Hatteras, was destroyed by the armed screw steamer USS Union (United States Navy).
John	United Kingdom	The brig was driven ashore at Great Yarmouth, Norfolk. She was on a voyage from Hartlepool, County Durham to Havre de Grâce, Seine-Inférieure, France.
Mary Ann Duffers	United Kingdom	The barque was run down and sunk in the Bristol Channel by M. V. Moses (United States and sank with the loss of nine of her twelve crew. Survivors were rescued by M. V. Moses. Mary Ann Duffers was on a voyage from Newport, Monmouthshire to Barcelona, Spain.
Othiona	United Kingdom	The ship was driven ashore at Jury's Gap, Sussex.
Petrel	Confederate States of America	Illustration from 1862 of USS St. Lawrence sinking Petrel. American Civil War, Union blockade: On the same day she departed Charleston, South Carolina, on her first voyage as a Confederate privateer, the former United States Revenue Marine revenue cutter mistook the frigate USS St. Lawrence (United States Navy) for an American merchant ship in the North Atlantic Ocean off the coast of South Carolina and fired three shots at her. St. Lawrence returned fire, and one of her 8-inch (203-mm) shells sank Petrel at 32°30′N 079°09′W thirty minutes after the engagement began. Four of Petrel′s crew were killed. Her 36 survivors were taken prisoner by St. Lawrence and later tried for piracy.
Warhawk	United Kingdom	The barque ran aground at Shoreham-by-Sea, Sussex. She was on a voyage from Hartlepool to Shoreham-by-Sea. She was refloated and taken in to port.

== 29 July ==
List of shipwrecks: 29 July 1863
Ship	State	Description
Andy Fulton	United States	The 146-ton sidewheel paddle steamer burned on the Ohio River at Carrollton, Kentucky.
Jules d'Claire	France	The brig was wrecked on the Île de Sein, Finistère. Her crew were rescued. She was on a voyage from Saint-Nazaire, Loire-Inférieure to Liverpool, Lancashire, United Kingdom.

== 30 July ==
List of shipwrecks: 30 July 1861
Ship	State	Description
Christiana	United Kingdom	The schooner was driven ashore at Greatstone, Kent. She was on a voyage from Sunderland, County Durham to Caen, Calvados.
Falcon	United Kingdom	The brig sprang a leak and sank in the English Channel off Beachy Head, Sussex. She was on a voyage from Newcastle upon Tyne, Northumberland to Brest, Finistère, France.
Fame	United Kingdom	The schooner foundered off the Calf of Man, Isle of Man. Her crew were rescued by Stirlingshire. Fame was on a voyage from Whitehaven, Cumberland to Newcastle upon Tyne.
Golden Rule	United Kingdom	The ship was wrecked on the Bird Island Spit.
Kotka, and Z. C. Pearson	Sweden; United Kingdom	The schooner Kotka collided with the steamship Z. C. Pearson and sank in the Baltic Sea between Bornholm, Denmark and Gotland. Her crew took to a boat; they were rescued the next day by a British barque. She was on a voyage from Wasa to Lübeck. Z. C. Pearson consequently foundered with the loss of all 27 crew. She was on a voyage from Riga, Russia ro Hull, Yorkshire
William	United Kingdom	The sloop was driven ashore at Margate, Kent. She was on a voyage from South Shields, County Durham to Caen. She was refloated and taken in to Margate.

== 31 July ==
List of shipwrecks: 31 July 1861
Ship	State	Description
Adriatic	United States	American Civil War: The steamship ran aground at the mouth of the Pocomoke River and may have been destroyed to prevent capture or captured.
Cadwallader	United States	American Civil War: The steamship ran aground at the mouth of the Pocomoke River and may have been destroyed to prevent capture or captured.
Fanny	United States	American Civil War: The steamship ran aground at the mouth of the Pocomoke River and may have been destroyed to prevent capture or captured.
Vriendschap	Netherlands	The ship was wrecked on the Cabadello Rock, off Porto, Portugal. Her crew were rescued. She was on a voyage from Porto to London, United Kingdom.
Unnamed vessel	United Kingdom	The ship was attacked and burnt by the privateer Speed (Confederate States of America) off Nag's Head, North Carolina, Confederate States of America. Her crew were murdered.

== Unknown date ==
List of shipwrecks: Unknown date July 1861
Ship	State	Description
Du Chayla	French Navy	The corvette ran aground in the Saigon River upstream of Saigon, French Cochinchina. She was refloated
Hero	United Kingdom	The ship foundered in the Atlantic Ocean 20 nautical miles (37 km) from the equator. Her crew were rescued by Johanna Maria (Flag unknown). Maria was on a voyage from Newport, Monmouthshire to Manila, Spanish East Indies.
Julie	Netherlands	The ship foundered in the North Sea off the coast of Norway before 23 July. Her crew survived. She was on a voyage from Arkhangelsk, Russia to Amsterdam, North Holland.
Lady Kinnaird	United Kingdom	The ship was wrecked in the Torres Straits 4 nautical miles (7.4 km) north of the Sir Charles Hardy Islands before 26 July. All on board were rescued by Chutah ( India) and the schooner Marchioness ( (United Kingdom of Great Britain and Ireland) New South Wales). She was on a voyage from Sydney, New South Wales to Calcutta, India.
Louisiana	United Kingdom	The ship was wrecked at Alibag, India before 28 July with the loss of five of her crew. She was on a voyage from Liverpool, Lancashire to Bombay, India.
Noosrutshall	India	The ship was wrecked at Kedgeree before 22 July. Eight crew were reported missing.
Pacific	United States	The steamer struck Coffin Rock in the Columbia River and ran aground on the Oregon shore. She was salvaged.
Shooting Star	Flag unknown	The schooner capsized off the coast of California off Bodega Bay.
Urania, Wanderer, or Warrior	United Kingdom	The ship was wrecked at Badagry, Africa.
Victory	United Kingdom	The ship ran aground on the Newcombe Sand, in the North Sea off the coast of Suffolk. She was on a voyage from Newcastle upon Tyne, Northumberland to Plymouth, Devon. She was refloated and taken in to Lowestoft, Suffolk in a severely leaky condition.
Unnamed	Koblenz	The overloaded ferry sank in the Rhine at Koblenz. Fourteen of the 40 people on board were drowned.
