= 1873 Birthday Honours =

National awards given by Queen Victoria

The 1873 Birthday Honours were appointments by Queen Victoria to various orders and honours to reward and highlight good works by citizens of the British Empire. The appointments were made to celebrate the official birthday of the Queen, and were published in The London Gazette on 24 May 1873.

The recipients of honours are displayed here as they were styled before their new honour, and arranged by honour, with classes (Knight, Knight Grand Cross, etc.) and then divisions (Military, Civil, etc.) as appropriate.

== United Kingdom and British Empire ==
=== The Most Honourable Order of the Bath ===
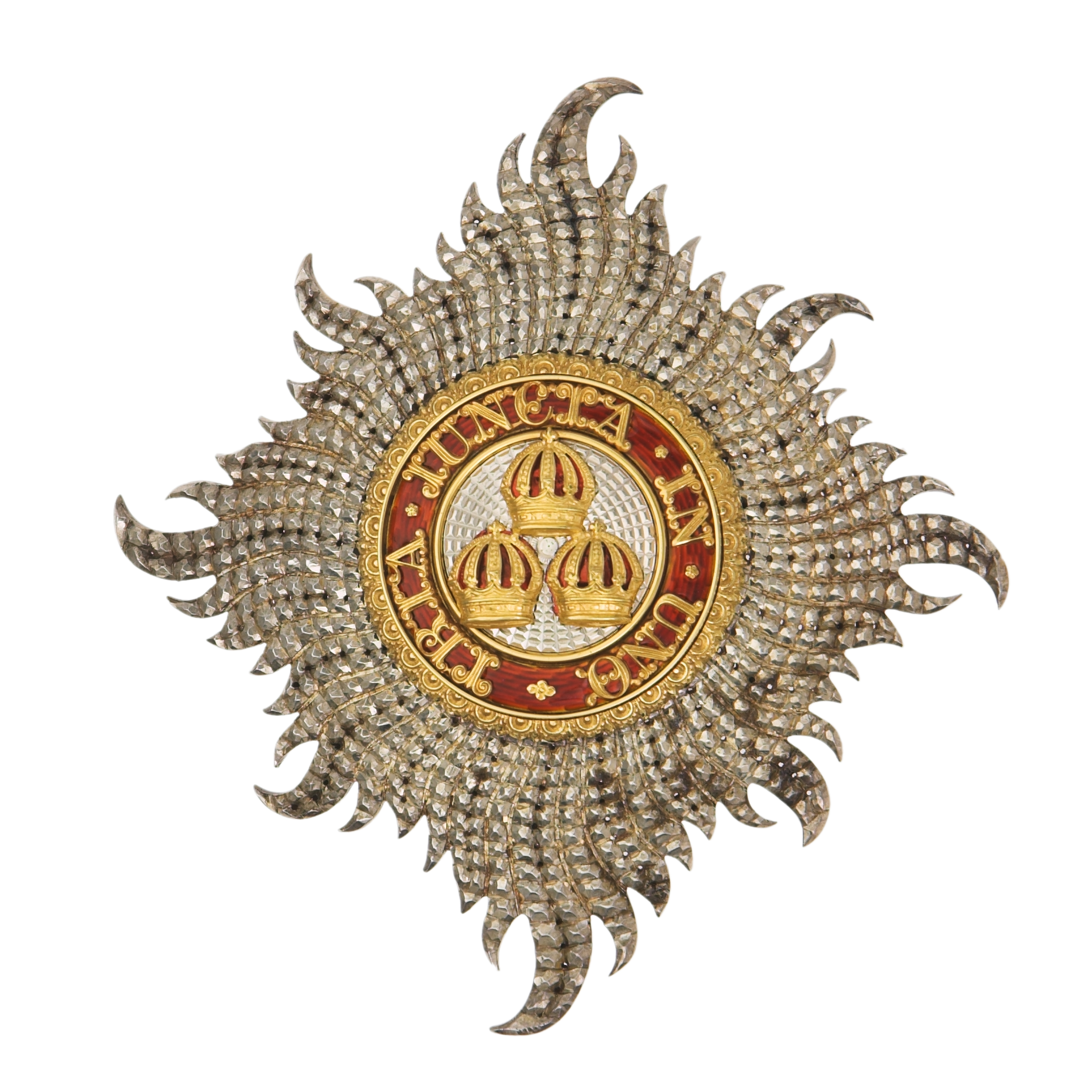
Civilian star of the Knight Grand Cross of the Order of the Bath

==== Knight Grand Cross of the Order of the Bath (GCB) ====
===== Military Division =====
Royal Navy

- Admiral Sir Provo William Parry Wallis KCB
- Admiral Sir William Fanshawe Martin Bt KCB
- Admiral Thomas, Earl of Lauderdale KCB
- Admiral Sir Lewis Tobias Jones KCB

Army

- General Sir Henry George Andrew Taylor KCB
- General Sir George Bowles KCB
- General Sir Abraham Roberts KCB
- General Sir James Charles Chatterton Bt KCB
- General Sir William Henry Elliott KCB
- Lieutenant-General Sir Sydney John Cotton KCB
- Lieutenant-General Sir John Bloomfield KCB
- Lieutenant-General Sir Duncan Alexander Cameron KCB

==== Knight Commander of the Order of the Bath (KCB) ====
===== Military Division =====
Royal Navy

- Admiral Henry Smith CB
- Admiral Sir Thomas Sabine Pasley Bt
- Vice-Admiral George St. Vincent King CB
- Admiral Charles Eden CB
- Vice-Admiral the Honourable James Robert Drummond CB
- Rear-Admiral John Walter Tarleton CB
- Rear-Admiral Charles Frederick Alexander Shadwell CB
- Rear-Admiral Astley Cooper Key CB

Army

- Lieutenant-General Francis Warde
- Lieutenant-General Frederick William Hamilton CB
- Lieutenant-General Arthur Mitford Becher CB
- Lieutenant-General Charles Trollope CB
- Lieutenant-General Edward Cooper Hodge CB
- Lieutenant-General the Honourable Alexander Hamilton-Gordon CB
- Lieutenant-General John Fordyce
- Lieutenant-General Philip Melmoth Nelson Guy CB
- Major-General Lord Henry Hugh Manvers Percy
- Major-General Charles Henry Ellice CB
- Major-General Richard Wilbraham CB
- Major-General James Duncan Macpherson CB
- Major-General Edmund Haythorne
- Major-General Henry Drury Harness CB
- Major-General Henry Wylie Norman CB
- Colonel John Miller Adye CB
- Surgeon-General William Mure Muir CB

==== Companion of the Order of the Bath (CB) ====
===== Military Division =====
Royal Navy

- Rear-Admiral Edwin Clayton Tennyson-d'Eyncourt
- Rear-Admiral Arthur Mellersh
- Rear-Admiral Robert Coote
- Captain Julian Foulston Slight
- Captain Thomas Saumarez
- Captain William Andrew James Heath
- Captain Cornelius Thomas Augustus Noddall
- Captain Robert Gibson
- Captain Augustus Chetham Strode

Army

- General Edward Armstrong, Madras Infantry
- Lieutenant-General Maurice Barlow
- Lieutenant-General Matthew Smith
- Lieutenant-General Henry Bates
- Lieutenant-General George Staunton
- Lieutenant-General James Travers VC Bengal Infantry
- Major-General John Leslie Dennis
- Major-General James Abbott, Royal (late Bengal) Artillery
- Major-General John Stafford Paton, Bengal Staff Corps
- Major-General Charles Elmhirst
- Major-General Sir James Edward Alexander
- Major-General Charles Arthur Barwell, Bengal Staff Corps
- Major-General William Henry March, retired, Royal Marines
- Colonel Charles Tyrwhitt
- Colonel George Calvert Clarke, late 2nd Dragoons
- Colonel Frederick Amelius Whimper
- Colonel Edmund Augustus Whitmore
- Colonel John Josiah Hort, Brigade Depot
- Colonel James Croft Brooke, late 8th Regiment
- Colonel Frederick Robert Elrington, Rifle Depot
- Colonel Percy Archer Butler, late 28th Regiment
- Colonel William Sankey, 62nd Regiment
- Colonel Lord Augustus Charles Lennox FitzRoy
- Colonel William James Loftus, late 38th Regiment
- Colonel Henry Meade Hamilton, Brigade Depot
- Colonel Michael Anthony Shrapnel Biddulph, Royal Artillery
- Colonel Bartholomew O'Brien, Brigade Depot
- Colonel Cadwallader Adams, 49th Regiment
- Colonel Henry Hamilton Maxwell, Royal (late Bengal) Artillery
- Colonel Robert White, Brigade Depot
- Colonel Charles Edward Parke Gordon, late 75th Regiment
- Colonel David Scott Dodgson, Bengal Infantry
- Colonel William James Esten Grant, Royal Artillery
- Colonel John Desborough, Royal Artillery
- Colonel Robert Cadell, Royal (late Madras) Artillery
- Colonel Charles Malcolm Barrow, Bombay Staff Corps
- Colonel Alfred Bassano, late 82nd Regiment
- Colonel Arthur Howlett, Madras Staff Corps
- Colonel Frederick William Burroughs, 93rd Regiment
- Colonel George Whittle Mackenzie Hall, Bengal Staff Corps
- Colonel Peter Stark Lumsden CSI Bengal Staff Corps
- Colonel Shurlock Henning, 38th Regiment
- Colonel John Hamilton Cox, late 75th Regiment
- Colonel Arthur Bunny, Royal (late Bengal) Artillery
- Colonel Charles Butler Peter Nugent Hodges Nugent, Royal Engineers
- Lieutenant-Colonel William John Williams, Royal Artillery
- Lieutenant-Colonel John Irvine Murray, Bengal Staff Corps
- Lieutenant-Colonel Robert Baigrie, Bombay Staff Corps
- Lieutenant-Colonel Dominick Sarsfield Greene, Royal Artillery
- Lieutenant-Colonel Frederick Richard Maunsell, Royal (late Bengal) Engineers
- Inspector-General of Hospitals and Fleets John Rees (retired)
- Inspector-General of Hospitals Richard Dane
- Inspector-General of Hospitals Benjamin William Marlow
- Surgeon-Major John Wyatt, Coldstream Guards
- Deputy Controller Randolph Routh
- Deputy Controller Henry Bartlett
- Deputy Controller Alexander Crowder Crookshank

=== The Most Exalted Order of the Star of India ===
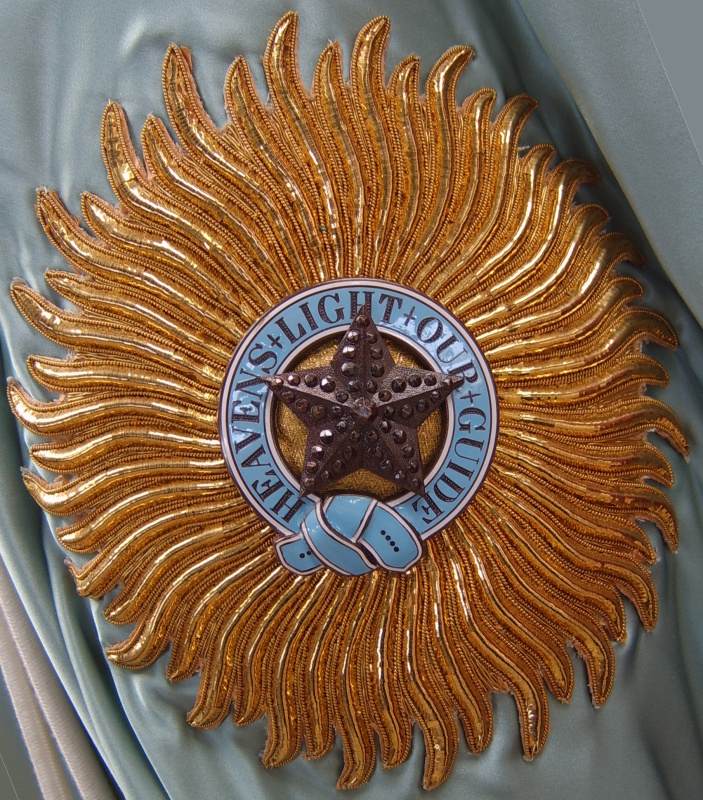
Star of a Knight Grand Commander of the Most Exalted Order of the Star of India

==== Knight Grand Commander (GCSI) ====
- His Excellency Maharajah Jung Bahadoor Kunwar Ranajee GCB Prime Minister of Nepal
- General Sir John Low KCB Madras Infantry, formerly Political Resident at Lucknow and Hyderabad and Member of the Council of the Governor-General of India
- Lieutenant-General Sir Neville Bowles Chamberlain KCB KCSI Bengal Infantry, late Commanding Punjab Irregular Force

==== Knight Commander (KCSI) ====
- Nawab Khan Bahadoor Khwajah Muhammad Khan Khuttuk, of Kohat
- George Campbell, Bengal Civil Service, Lieutenant-Governor of Bengal
- Alexander John Arbuthnot CSI Madras Civil Service, late Member of the Council of the Governor of Madras
- Major-General Harry Burnett Lumsden CB Bengal Staff Corps, late Envoy to Candahar

==== Companion (CSI) ====
- John Forbes David Inglis, Bengal Civil Service, Senior Member of the Board of Revenue, North-West Provinces, and additional Member of the Council of the Governor-General of India for making Laws and Regulations
- Lieutenant-Colonel Alexander Campbell McNeill, late Madras Staff Corps, formerly Agent to the Governor-General in Orissa
- John Ware Edgar, Bengal Civil Service, Deputy Commissioner, Cachar, late Political Officer attached to the Looshai Expeditionary Force
