= HMS Albion (1842) =

Ship of the line of the Royal Navy

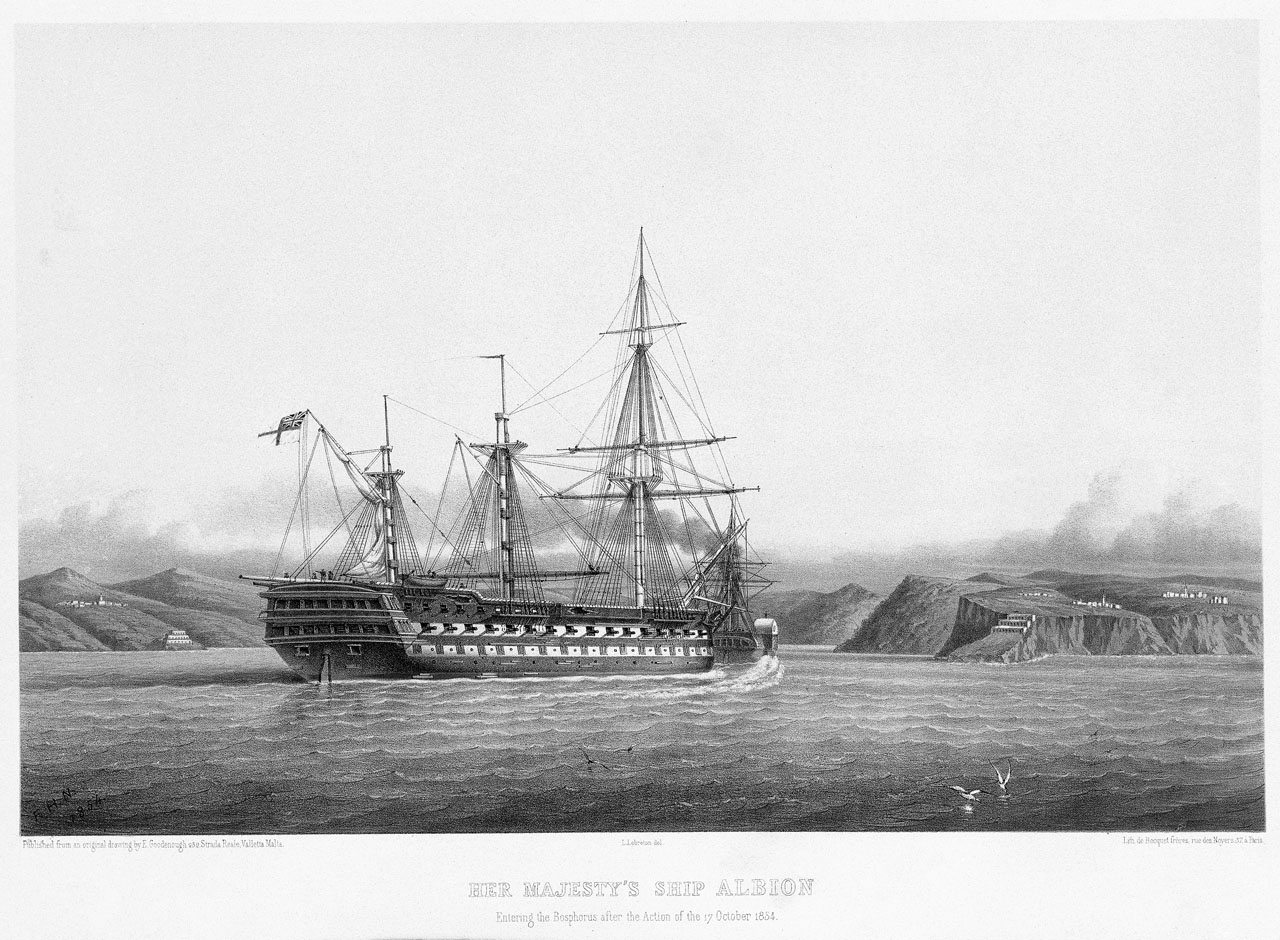
- Albion entering the Bosphorus, partially dismasted after the action of 17 October 1854.

History

United Kingdom
- Name: Albion
- Ordered: 21 June 1839
- Builder: HM Dockyard, Devonport
- Laid down: 13 August 1839
- Launched: 6 September 1842
- Completed: 23 January 1844
- Commissioned: 10 November 1843
- Fate: Sold for scrap, August 1884

General characteristics
- Class & type: 90-gun, second-rate, Albion-class ship of the line
- Tons burthen: 3,110 62/94 (bm)
- Length: 204 ft (62.2 m) (gun deck)
- Beam: 60 ft 2 in (18.3 m)
- Draught: 19 ft 4 in (5.89 m) (light)
- Depth of hold: 23 ft 8 in (7.2 m)
- Sail plan: Full-rigged ship
- Complement: 820 (wartime)
- Armament: 90 muzzle-loading, smoothbore guns: Lower gun deck: 28 × 32 pdr guns + 4 × 68 pdr guns; Upper gun deck: 26 × 32 pdr guns + 8 × 8 in (203 mm) shell guns; Forecastle & Quarterdeck: 24 × 32 pdr guns + 2 × 8 in shell guns

HMS Albion was a 90-gun, second-rate ship of the line of the Royal Navy. Completed in 1844, Albion was the only ship of her class to ever serve as a sailing ship, and the last British two-decker to be completed and enter service without a steam engine. She was the name ship of a class of three second rates—the others being Aboukir and Exmouth.

== Background and description ==
Plan of Albion as a sailing ship

William Symonds, the Surveyor of the Navy, designed the Albion class in 1839 in response to a perceived shortage of British second-rate ships that were outnumbered by those of the French Navy. Symonds emphasized the ships' sailing qualities, rather than battle efficiency as they had a quick roll in poor weather that made them bad gun platforms. Albion measured 204 feet (62.2 m) at the gun deck and 166 feet (50.6 m) at the keel. She had a beam of 60 feet 2 inches (18.3 m), a depth of hold of 23 feet 8 inches (7.2 m) and had a tonnage of 3,110 62/94 tons burthen. Her crew numbered 820 officers and ratings in wartime. The ship had the usual three-masted full-ship rig.

Albion's muzzle-loading, smoothbore armament consisted of four 112 cwt, (Note: "Cwt" is the abbreviation for hundredweight, 112 cwt referring to the weight of the gun.) 68-pounder guns and twenty-eight 32-pounder (56 cwt) guns on the lower gun deck with six 8-inch (203 mm) 65 cwt, shell guns and twenty-six 56 cwt, 32-pounder guns on the upper gun deck. Between their forecastle and quarterdeck, the ship carried a pair of 8-inch (52 cwt) shell guns and twenty-four 32-pounder (42 cwt) guns.

The 112-cwt guns were found to be too big and cumbersome on a crowded gun deck and Albion was rearmed in May 1849 with thirty-two 65 cwt, 68-pounder guns on the lower gun deck, thirty-two 56 cwt, 32 pounder guns on the upper gun deck and twenty-four 32 pounder (42 cwt) gun on the forecastle and quarterdeck. Her peacetime crew was increased to 820 men in peacetime.

== Construction and career ==
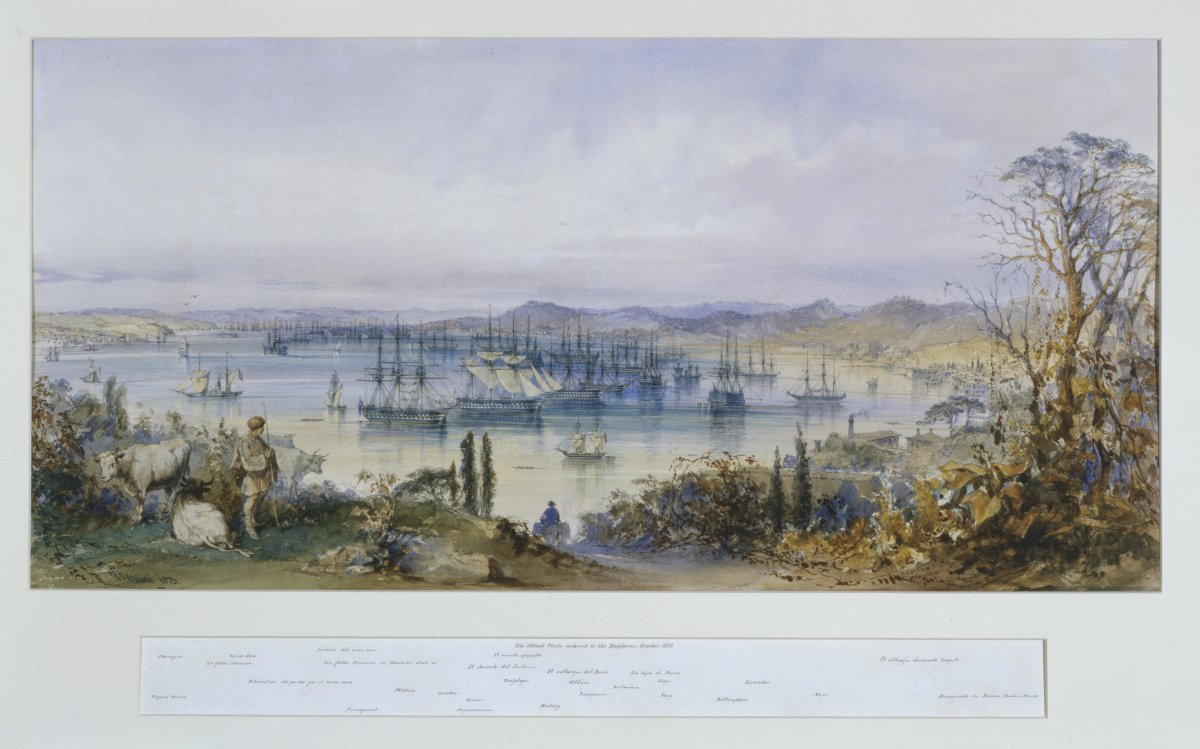
Albion and the Allied Fleets anchored in the Bosphorus, late 1853; the prelude to the Crimean war. Amedeo Preziosi

Honouring an old name for England, Albion was the fourth ship of her name to serve in the RN. She was ordered on 18 March 1839 from Devonport Dockyard and laid down on 13 August. The ship was launched on 6 September 1842 and was completed by 23 January 1844 after having the stern's overhang reduced. Captain Nicholas Lockyer commissioned Albion on 10 November 1843, and the ship became the flagship of Admiral David Milne, Commander-in-Chief, Plymouth.

The First Lord of the Admiralty, Earl Haddington, and the First Naval Lord, Admiral George Cockburn vehemently disagreed with Symonds' ship designs, which were radically different to previous practice, with their emphasis on ship speeds. Party factionalism was a major contributor to the feud as Haddington and Cochrane were both Tories while Symonds, was a Whig. Other factors included Symonds' increasing opposition to steam propulsion as he aged, his preference for sailing qualities over fighting efficiency, his acerbic personality and his inability to accept criticism as anything other than a personal attack.

Determined to prove Symonds' designs to be inferior, the Board of Admiralty organized Experimental Squadrons in the mid-1840s to conduct comparative sailing trials. Albion rendezvoused with the 1844 squadron, under command of Rear-Admiral William Bowles, temporarily detached from his position as Commissioner of the Admiralty), on 6 November. The other ships of the squadron included the elderly first rates Caledonia, St Vincent and Symonds' first rate Queen. All of the ships were captained by Tory sympathisers, although Bowles was a Whig and supporter of Symonds.

The ship was deployed to the Black Sea during the Crimean War. Her crew suffered many casualties from cholera in August 1854. She took part in the Siege of Sevastopol, with her commanding officer, Captain Stephen Lushington taking charge of a Naval Brigade providing vital heavy artillery support for the Allied forces besieging Sevastopol. On 17 October 1854, Albion, under the command of Commander Henry Rogers joined over 50 British and French warships of various types in an initial seaborne bombardment of Sevastapol. The Russians suffered heavy casualties (at least 1,100 men) but the Allies had failed to seriously damage the batteries. The Anglo-French fleet had received comparatively light casualties, with about 500 killed or wounded in total. However, the Allies had taken a beating from the Russian batteries, and Albion had been set on fire three times during the engagement, with 11 killed and 71 injured. Without the assistance of tugs, it is probable that Albion would have run aground.Captain James Drummond assumed command of the ship on 7 July. On 17 August 1855 Albion took part in the fifth bombardment of Sevastopol.

The From 1860 until 1861, she was converted to steam screw propulsion at Devonport, but the modifications were never finished. She was kept in reserve in Devonport for more than twenty years, before the decision was made to scrap her, and she was finally broken up at Devonport in 1884.
