= List of shipwrecks in May 1857 =

The list of shipwrecks in May 1857 includes ships sunk, wrecked or otherwise lost during May 1857.

== 1 May ==
List of shipwrecks: 1 May 1857
Ship	State	Description
Erato	Netherlands	The schooner was wrecked at the mouth of the Rio Grande. Her crew were rescued. She was on a voyage from Liverpool, Lancashire, United Kingdom to the Rio Grande.
Harriet	United Kingdom	The ship was driven ashore east of Leba, Prussia. Her crew were rescued. She was on a voyage from Hartlepool, County Durham to Danzig.
Helen E. Brooke	United States	The ship was wrecked on the Carysfort Reef. She was on a voyage from Cardiff, Glamorgan, United Kingdom to New Orleans, Louisiana.
Imperial Prince	United Kingdom	The schooner collided with the steamship Peninsula (United Kingdom and sank off the Owers Sandbank, in the English Channel off the coast of Sussex with the loss of two of her seven crew. Survivors were rescued by Peninsula. Imperial Prince was on a voyage from Newport, Monmouthshire to Harburg.

== 2 May ==
List of shipwrecks: 2 May 1857
Ship	State	Description
Active	United Kingdom	The brig ran aground on the Newcombe Sand, in the North Sea off the coast of Suffolk. She was refloated and taken in to Lowestoft, Suffolk.
Thessalia	United Kingdom	The steamship was driven ashore at Smyrna, Ottoman Empire. She was refloated.
Thomas Lord	(United Kingdom of Great Britain and Ireland) New South Wales	The ship was driven ashore and wrecked at Launceston Heads, Tasmania.
William Parker	United Kingdom	The ship ran aground and capsized at Calcutta, India. She was on a voyage from Liverpool, Lancashire to Calcutta. She was declared a total loss.

== 3 May ==
List of shipwrecks: 3 May 1857
Ship	State	Description
Anna	United Kingdom	The full-rigged ship was wrecked on the Pratas Shoal, in the South China Sea. She was on a voyage from Singapore, Straits Settlements to China.
Thomas and William	United Kingdom	The ship was abandoned and foundered in the Atlantic Ocean. She was on a voyage from Liverpool, Lancashire to Newfoundland, British North America.
Prinses Sofia	Netherlands	The full-rigged ship was wrecked on the East Sands, between Diamond Island and Cape Negrais, Burma. She was on a voyage from Amsterdam, North Holland to Bassein, Burma.

== 5 May ==
List of shipwrecks: 5 May 1857
Ship	State	Description
Meta Hermina	Kingdom of Hanover	The galiot collided with the transport ship Herefordshire (United Kingdom) and foundered in the English Channel between Portland Bill and Start Point, Devon, United Kingdom.
Ormus	United Kingdom	The steamship ran aground at Salonica, Greece She was on a voyage from Liverpool, Lancashire to Salonica.
Orontes	United Kingdom	The steamship ran aground at Karaburun, Ottoman Empire. She was on a voyage from Liverpool to Smyrna, Ottoman Empire.
Rena	United Kingdom	The ship ran aground off "Alsrift", Denmark. She was on a voyage from the Clyde to Randers, Norway.

== 6 May ==
List of shipwrecks: 6 May 1857
Ship	State	Description
Hebe	United Kingdom	The ship was driven onto a rock at Moulmein, Burma. She was consequently condemned.
Philah	United States	The ship was driven ashore in the Dry Tortugas. She was on a voyage from New Orleans, Louisiana to Gothenburg, Sweden. She was refloated and taken in to Key West, Florida in a severely leaky condition.
Shepphard	United Kingdom	The brigantine ran aground on the Corton Sand, in the North Sea off the coast of Suffolk. She was on a voyage from Middlesbrough, Yorkshire to Hythe, Kent. She was refloated the next day and resumed her voyage.
Ward Jackson	United Kingdom	The ship ran aground on the London Chest, in the Baltic Sea. She was on a voyage from Hartlepool, County Durham to Kronstadt, Russia. She was refloated and taken in to Kronstadt.

== 7 May ==
List of shipwrecks: 7 May 1857
Ship	State	Description
Dancing Feather	United States	The boat went ashore in thick fog, on the beach north of Point Bonita in San Francisco Bay, California.

== 8 May ==
List of shipwrecks: 8 May 1857
Ship	State	Description
Breeze	United Kingdom	The ship ran aground at Yarmouth, Isle of Wight. She was on a voyage from Yarmouth to Bristol, Gloucestershire.
Gesina	Kingdom of Hanover	The galiot was in collision with the steamship Stolp ( Stolp) and capsized and sank in the Baltic Sea. She was on a voyage from Rügenwalde, Prussia to an English port.
Hillechiena	Flag unknown	The galiot ran aground at Dover, Kent, United Kingdom. She was on a voyage from Lisbon, Portugal to Saint Petersburg, Russia.
Willemantia	Netherlands	The tjalk collided with the collier Mars (United Kingdom) and sank at Brielle, South Holland. Her crew were rescued.

== 9 May ==
List of shipwrecks: 9 May 1857
Ship	State	Description
Mary Ann	United Kingdom	The Humber Keel was wrecked on the Barcum Sand, in the Humber. She was on a voyage from York to Patrington, Yorkshire.
Okehampton	United Kingdom	The brig was wrecked on the Longsand, in the North Sea off the coast of Essex with the loss of two of her crew. Survivors were rescued by the smack Eagle (United Kingdom. Okehampton was on a voyage from Dunkirk, Nord to Sunderland, County Durham.

== 10 May ==
List of shipwrecks: 10 May 1857
Ship	State	Description
Iris	Denmark	The ship was sunk by ice off "Tolbuchin", Russia.
Ludwig	Sweden	The ship was sunk by ice off "Tolbuchin".
Morgiana	United Kingdom	The barque ran aground and sank on the Corton Sand, in the North Sea off the coast of Suffolk. Her crew were rescued by a yawl. She was on a voyage from Sunderland, County Durham to Lisbon, Portugal.

== 11 May ==
List of shipwrecks: 11 May 1857
Ship	State	Description
Greenwell	United Kingdom	The ship ran aground on the Swinebottoms, in the Baltic Sea. She was on a voyage from Memel, Prussia to London. She was later refloated and resumed her voyage.

== 12 May ==
List of shipwrecks: 12 May 1857
Ship	State	Description
Britannia	United Kingdom	The brig was driven ashore and wrecked on Inagua, Bahamas. She was on a voyage from Port-au-Prince, Haiti to Queenstown, County Cork.
HMS Exmouth	Royal Navy	The Albion-class ship of the line ran aground in Cewgreace Bay, west of The Lizard, Cornwall. She was refloated.
James Trail	United Kingdom	The ship ran aground at Thurso, Caithness. She was on a voyage from Newcastle upon Tyne, Northumberland to Thurso. She was refloated.
Neptune	United Kingdom	The ship struck the Hold Rocks and was damaged. She put in to Plymouth, Devon in a leaky condition.
Prompt	United States	The ship was struck by lightning, caught fire and sank in Mobile Bay. She was on a voyage from Mobile, Alabama to Baltimore, Maryland.

== 13 May ==
List of shipwrecks: 13 May 1857
Ship	State	Description
Alliance	United Kingdom	The ketch foundered in the North Sea off Huttoft, Lincolnshire. She was on a voyage from King's Lynn, Norfolk to London.
H. M.	United Kingdom	The barque was wrecked on Cozumel, Venezuela. Her crew were rescued.
Lida	United Kingdom	The ship was damaged by fire at Ramsgate, Kent. She was on a voyage from Liverpool, Lancashire to Havre de Grâce, Seine-Inférieure, France.
Mabel	United Kingdom	The ship ran aground on the Swinebottoms, in the Baltic Sea. She was on a voyage from Hartlepool, County Durham to Stockholm, Sweden. She was refloated and taken in to Helsingør, Denmark.
Vintage	United Kingdom	The ship ran aground on the Newcombe Sand, in the North Sea off the coast of Suffolk. She was refloated and taken in to Lowestoft, Suffolk in a leaky condition.

== 14 May ==
List of shipwrecks: 14 May 1857
Ship	State	Description
Elizabeth Ann	United Kingdom	The ship struck the Poll Sand, in the English Channel off the coast of Devon and sank. Her crew were rescued.
St. Winifred	United Kingdom	The ship struck the Priest Side Scar, in the Irish Sea, and sank. She was on a voyage from Liverpool, Lancashire to Carlisle, Cumberland. She was refloated in late August and beached at "Waterpool", Dumfriesshire.
William Patton	United States	The full-rigged ship ran aground at Akyab, Burma. She was on a voyage from Akyab to Falmouth, Cornwall, United Kingdom. She was refloated and put back to Akyab in a leaky condition.

== 15 May ==
List of shipwrecks: 15 May 1857
Ship	State	Description
Oberon	Prussia	The brig ran aground on the Holm Sand, in the North Sea off the coast of Suffolk. She was on a voyage from London to Newcastle upon Tyne, Northumberland, United Kingdom. She was refloated.

== 16 May ==
List of shipwrecks: 16 May 1857
Ship	State	Description
Æolus	United Kingdom	The barque ran aground on the Reval Stone. She was on a voyage from "Wyborg" to Grimsby, Lincolnshire. She was refloated on 19 May and resumed her voyage.
Juno	(United Kingdom of Great Britain and Ireland) New South Wales	The ship was driven ashore and wrecked in Moreton Bay.
Shooting Star	United Kingdom	The ship was driven ashore and wrecked near Torrevieja, Spain. She was on a voyage from Torrevieja to a Baltic port.

== 17 May ==
List of shipwrecks: 17 May 1857
Ship	State	Description
Robina Mitchell	United Kingdom	The full-rigged ship foundered in the Indian Ocean 140 nautical miles (260 km) south of False Point, India. Eleven crew took to the longboat; they were rescued by HCPV Guide ( Indian Navy), the rest reached Pooree Island in their boat. Robina Mitchell was on a voyage from Madras to Bimlipapam, India and London.
Sea King	United Kingdom	The ship went aground in fog on a reef off Rhosneigr, Anglesey, refloated, but damaged rudder and struck other rocks becoming a wreck. She was on a voyage from Callao, Peru to Liverpool, Lancashire.

== 18 May ==
List of shipwrecks: 18 May 1857
Ship	State	Description
Mary	United Kingdom	The sloop was wrecked on Islay, Inner Hebrides. Her crew survived. She was on a voyage from Glasgow, Renfrewshire to Inverness.
Newton	United States	The barque was stove by a cake of ice south of Taui Bay in the Sea of Okhotsk. The wreck was purchased for $27 by Captain Henry of the ship Brutus (United States), who saved about 200 barrels of whale oil.
Nile	(United Kingdom of Great Britain and Ireland) British North America	The ship was abandoned in the Atlantic Ocean. Her crew were rescued. She was on a voyage from Port Medway, Nova Scotia to Barbados.
Secret	United Kingdom	The barque ran aground at Stromness, Orkney Islands and was beached. She was on a voyage from Hartlepool, County Durham to Quebec City, Province of Canada, British North America.

== 19 May ==
List of shipwrecks: 19 May 1857
Ship	State	Description
Athene	United Kingdom	The barque ran aground in the River Wear. She was on a voyage from Sunderland, County Durham to Calcutta, India.
Falcon	United Kingdom	The brig ran aground off Eierland, North Holland, Netherlands. She was on a voyage from Sunderland to Amsterdam, North Holland. She was refloated and taken in to "Roggesloof" in a leaky condition.
Moodke	United Kingdom	The barque was driven ashore on Skagen, Denmark. She was on a voyage from Hull, Yorkshire to "Wyburg". She had been refloated by 22 May.
Red Gauntlet	United Kingdom	The ship ran aground at Akyab, Burma. She was on a voyage from Akyab to Queenstown, County Cork. She was refloated and put back to Akyab in a leaky condition.

== 20 May ==
List of shipwrecks: 20 May 1857
Ship	State	Description
Betsey	United Kingdom	The schooner was wrecked on the African coast. Her crew were rescued. She was on a voyage from Hull, Yorkshire to Lagos.
Henry Bell	United Kingdom	The brig ran aground on the Scroby Sands, Norfolk. She was on a voyage from South Shields, County Durham to Havre de Grâce, Seine-Inférieure, France. She was refloated and found to be leaky. Henry Bell put in to Great Yarmouth, Norfolk on 23 May.
Oracle	United Kingdom	The ship caught fire whilst on a voyage from Sunderland, County Durham to Cruden Bay, Aberdeenshire due to her cargo of quicklime getting wet. She put in to Peterhead, Aberdeenshire in a severely damaged condition.

== 21 May ==
List of shipwrecks: 21 May 1857
Ship	State	Description
Canton	United Kingdom	The ship ran aground on the Droogden, in the Baltic Sea. She was on a voyage from Hull, Yorkshire to Kronstadt, Russia.

== 22 May ==
List of shipwrecks: 22 May 1857
Ship	State	Description
Marino Faliero	Kingdom of Sardinia	The brig ran aground on the Goodwin Sands, Kent, United Kingdom. She was on a voyage from Marseille, Bouches-du-Rhône, France to Newcastle upon Tyne, Northumberland, United Kingdom. She was refloated with assistance from Deal boatmen and resumed her voyage.

== 23 May ==
List of shipwrecks: 23 May 1857
Ship	State	Description
Amelia	United Kingdom	The ship ran aground on Scroby Sands, Norfolk. She was on a voyage from London to Hartlepool, County Durham. She was refloated the next day and taken in to Great Yarmouth, Norfolk in a leaky condition.
Helene	Kingdom of Hanover	The brig was driven ashore and wrecked in Buenaventura Bay. She was on a voyage from London to Buenaventura, Republic of New Granada. She was refloated on 19 June and taken in to Panama City, Republic of New Granada.
Henriette	France	The steamship ran aground near Kronstadt, Russia.
Saturn	(United Kingdom of Great Britain and Ireland) British North America	The ship caught fire and was abandoned in the Mediterranean Sea 140 nautical miles (260 km) west of Sardinia.

== 24 May ==
List of shipwrecks: 24 May 1857
Ship	State	Description
Abel Gower	United Kingdom	The ship was beached at St. Jago de Cuba, Cuba. She was on a voyage from Jamaica to London. She was consequently condemned.

== 25 May ==
List of shipwrecks: 25 May 1857
Ship	State	Description
Zoe	United Kingdom	The yacht was wrecked on the Haisborough Sands, in the North Sea off the coast of Norfolk. All twenty people on board survived.

== 26 May ==
List of shipwrecks: 26 May 1857
Ship	State	Description
Erin	United Kingdom	The schooner was driven ashore at Fowey, Cornwall. Her crew were rescued.

== 27 May ==
List of shipwrecks: 27 May 1857
Ship	State	Description
Aphrogenia	United Kingdom	The barque was driven ashore at Cochin, India. She broke up on 2 June.
Aztec	United Kingdom	The ship ran aground off "Dalhousie". She was on a voyage from Bassein to Rangoon, Burma. She had been refloated by 2 September.
Belmont	United Kingdom	The ship ran aground and was damaged at Portmahomack, Ross-shire.
John	United Kingdom	The ship was abandoned off Fishguard, Pembrokeshire. Her crew were rescued. She was on a voyage from the Clyde to Boulogne, Pas-de-Calais, France.
Superior	United Kingdom	The barque foundered off Queenstown, County Cork. Her crew were rescued by Borland (United Kingdom). Superior was on a voyage from Cardiff, Glamorgan to Ascension Island.
Vesta	Stettin	The brig ran aground in the Castletown River. She was on a voyage from Danzig to Dundalk, County Louth, United Kingdom. She was refloated on 1 June.

== 28 May ==
List of shipwrecks: 28 May 1857
Ship	State	Description
Johanna Sophia	Russia	The ship was driven ashore and wrecked at Stralsund. She was on a voyage from Hull, Yorkshire to Saint Petersburg.

== 29 May ==
List of shipwrecks: 29 May 1857
Ship	State	Description
Inkermann	(United Kingdom of Great Britain and Ireland) British North America	The steamship suffered a boiler explosion and sank at Toronto, Province of Canada with the loss of nine lives. She was refloated on 14 June with assistance from the tugs Bob Moodie and Experiment and the schooner Beaver (all (United Kingdom of Great Britain and Ireland) British North America. Subsequently repaired.

== 30 May ==
List of shipwrecks: 30 May 1857
Ship	State	Description
Gipsey Queen	United Kingdom	The ship struck a rock at Yarmouth, Nova Scotia, British North America. She was on a voyage from Liverpool, Lancashire to Yarmouth. She was taken in to that harbour but capsized. She was subsequently righted but found to be severely damaged.
Joseph Sanderson	United Kingdom	The ship was sighted in the Indian Ocean whilst on a voyage from Calcutta, India to a British port. No further trace, presumed foundered with the loss of all hands.

== 31 May ==
List of shipwrecks: 31 May 1857
Ship	State	Description
Copse	United Kingdom	The brig ran aground on the Belfast Reef, off the north coast of Antigua. She was on a voyage from Liverpool to Montego Bay, Jamaica. She was later refloated and resumed her voyage.
Pacific	United States	The whaling barque foundered off the West Coast of the South Island of New Zealand. Only eight of the crew of 24 survived.
Stephen Larrabee	United States	The full-rigged ship was wrecked on the Colorados, off the coast of Cuba. Her crew were rescued. She was on a voyage from Newport, Virginia to Havana, Cuba.

== Unknown date ==
List of shipwrecks: Unknown date in May 1857
Ship	State	Description
Almenial	Kingdom of Sardinia	The barque was wrecked on the Northern Towbeys Reef, off the coast of British Honduras. Her crew survived.
Arracan	United Kingdom	The ship was driven ashore at "Fullah", India. She was on a voyage from Liverpool, Lancashire to Calcutta, India. She was refloated and completed her voyage, arriving on 12 May.
Ayrshire	United Kingdom	The ship ran aground on the China Baker Sands, off the coast of Burma. She was refloated.
Blackbird	United Kingdom	The brig capsized in the Atlantic Ocean before 7 May.
Brewer	United Kingdom	The ship ran aground on the Riding Rocks before 25 May. She was on a voyage from New Orleans, Louisiana, United States to Gibraltar. She was refloated and taken in to Nassau, Bahamas.
British Lion	United Kingdom	The ship ran aground at Brunswick, Georgia, United States and broke her back. She was refloated and towed in to Savannah, Georgia for repairs, arriving on 31 May.
Clarendon	United Kingdom	The ship ran aground on the China Baker Sands and was damaged. She was refloated and taken in to Calcutta, India for repairs.
Edward Johnston	United Kingdom	The ship foundered. Her crew were rescued by State of Maine (United States). Edward Johnston was on a voyage from Callao, Peru to Queenstown, County Cork.
Grace Vernon	(United Kingdom of Great Britain and Ireland) British North America	The ship capsized on being launched at Quebec City, Province of Canada before 23 May. She was righted but found to be severely hogged.
Ceres	Portugal	The schooner foundered in the Atlantic Ocean before 15 May. Her crew were rescued by Maria (Flag unknown}). Ceres was on a voyage from Rio de Janeiro, Brazil to Lisbon.
Europa	United Kingdom	The barque capsized in the Atlantic Ocean and was abandoned.
Hebrides	United Kingdom	The barque was driven ashore at Portland, Dorset. She was refloated on 27 May with assistance from the steamship Ocean Bride and was towed in to Weymouth, Dorset.
Lord Brougham	United Kingdom	The ship ran aground off Gotland, Sweden before 15 May. She was on a voyage from Kronstadt, Russia to London. She had floated off and foundered by 28 May.
Malacca	United Kingdom	The ship ran aground in Thornhill's Channel, in the Hooghly River. She was on a voyage from Calcutta to London. She was refloated and put back to Calcutta, where she arrived on 16 May in a leaky condition.
Mary and Ann	United Kingdom	The ship was wrecked on the Barnum Sand, in the North Sea off the coast of Lincolnshire before 7 May.
Mary St. George	United Kingdom	The ship was beached on the north coast of Madeira. She was a total loss.
Nymph	United Kingdom	The barque was lost at "Thelamock", near Amoy China.
San Para	Brazil	The ship was wrecked on the Welsh coast in early May.
Solon	United Kingdom	The brig ran aground on the Cockle Sand, in the North Sea off the coast of Norfolk. She was refloated but then ran aground on the Caister Patch. She was on a voyage from Hartlepool, County Durham to Rochester, Kent. Solon was refloated and taken in to Great Yarmouth, Norfolk in a leaky condition.
