= Sir John Murray =

Sir John Murray may refer to:

- Sir John Murray, 8th Baronet (c. 1768 – 1827), British general
- Sir John Murray of Broughton, 7th Baronet Stanhope (c. 1718 – 1777), Scottish Jacobite
- Sir John Irvine Murray (1826–1902), Scottish general who raised the 14th Murray's Jat Lancers
- Sir John Murray (oceanographer) (1841–1914), Scottish oceanographer
- Sir John Macgregor Murray, 1st Baronet, Scottish army officer
