= General Drummond =

General Drummond may refer to:

- Gordon Drummond (1772–1854), Canadian-born British Army general
- Laurence Drummond (1861–1946), British Army major general
- Percy Drummond (died 1843), British Army major general
- James Drummond, 3rd Duke of Perth (1713–1746), Scottish Jacobite Army lieutenant general
- William Drummond, 1st Viscount Strathallan (c. 1617–1688), Scottish forces major general and Muscovite Army lieutenant general

== See also ==
- Attorney General Drummond (disambiguation)
