= Attorney General Drummond =

Attorney General Drummond may refer to:

- Josiah Hayden Drummond (1827–1902), Attorney General of Maine
- Lewis Thomas Drummond (1813–1882), Attorney-General of the Province of Canada
- Gentner Drummond (1963- ), Attorney-General of Oklahoma

== See also ==
- General Drummond (disambiguation)
