= George Bowles (British Army officer) =

British general

General Sir George Bowles GCB (27 January 1787 – 21 May 1876) was a British general, colonel of the 1st West India Regiment, and lieutenant of the Tower of London.

Bowles was second son of William and Dinah Bowles of Heale House, Wiltshire, where he was born in 1787. His mother was the third daughter of Admiral Sir Thomas Frankland, 5th Baronet.

He entered the army as ensign in the Coldstream guards in 1804, and served with that corps in the north of Germany in 1805–6, at Copenhagen in 1807, in the Peninsula and south of France from 1809 to 1814, excepting the winters of 1810 and 1811, and in the Waterloo campaign, being present at the passage of the Douro, the battles of Talavera, Salamanca, and Vittoria, the capture of Madrid, the sieges of Ciudad Rodrigo, Badajos, Burgos, and San Sebastian, the passages of the Nive, Nivelle, and Adour, the investment of Bayonne, the battles of Quatre Bras and Waterloo, and the occupation of Paris. When a brevet-major he served as military secretary to the Duke of Richmond in Canada in 1818–20, and as deputy adjutant-general in the West Indies from 1820 to 1825. While with his battalion of the Coldstreams in Canada, as lieutenant-colonel and brevet-colonel, he commanded the troops in the Lower Province during the rebellion of 1838. He retired on half-pay in 1843.

In 1845 Bowles, who while on half-pay had been comptroller of the viceregal household in Dublin, was appointed master of the queen's household, in succession to the Hon. Charles Murray. A good deal of invidious feeling had arisen in connection with the duties of the office, and Bowles's appointment is said to have been made at the recommendation of the Duke of Wellington. He was promoted to the rank of major-general in 1846, and on his resignation of his appointment in the royal household, on account of ill-health, in 1851, was made Knight Commander of the Order of the Bath and appointed lieutenant of the Tower of London. He was appointed Knight Grand Cross of the Order of the Bath in the 1873 Birthday Honours.

Bowles, who was unmarried, died at his residence in Berkeley Street, Berkeley Square, London, on 21 May 1876, in the ninetieth year of his age.
