= Forbes MacBean (British Army officer, born 1857) =

British Army officer

Major-General Forbes MacBean CB CVO
- MacBean in 1917
- Born: 1857
- Died: 1919 (aged 61–62)
- Military career
- Branch: British Army
- Rank: Major-General
- Commands: Highland Division
- Conflicts: Second Anglo-Afghan War; Tirah campaign; Second Boer War
- Awards: Companion of the Order of the Bath; Commander of the Royal Victorian Order

Major-General Forbes MacBean CB CVO (1857–1919) was a British Army officer.

== Military career ==
Born the son of Colonel Forbes MacBean and educated at Uppingham School, MacBean was commissioned into the Gordon Highlanders in 1876. After taking part in the Second Anglo-Afghan War in 1879, he was mentioned in dispatches for his actions in taking the heights of Dargai in 1897 during the Tirah campaign.

MacBean also served in the Second Boer War in 1899. John Stirling recorded in his book 'Our Regiments in South Africa 1899–1902' that The Gordons were led by Lieut.-Colonel Burney and by Colonel Forbes Macbean, who has perhaps seen more hard fighting than any officer now alive and with his regiment.

He went on to be the first commander of the Highland Division, part of the newly created Territorial Force (TF), on 1 April 1908 and, promoted on 19 March 1911 to major general, commander of the 21st Bareilly Brigade in India in September 1911 before retiring from the army in January 1915, not long after the British entry into World War I.

He was aide-de-camp to the King Edward VII from 1907 to 1911.

Military offices
New title	GOC Highland Division; 1908–1911	Succeeded by Charles Woollcombe
