= Charles Woollcombe =

British army general

Lieutenant-general Sir Charles Woollcombe KCB KCMG
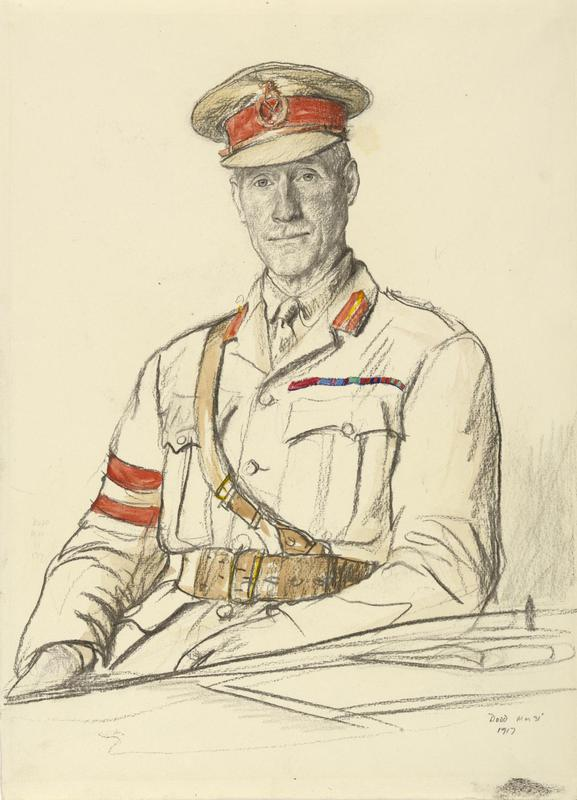
- Portrait by Francis Dodd, 1917
- Born: 23 March 1857; Petrockstowe, Devon, England
- Died: 6 May 1934 (aged 77); Bexhill-on-Sea, Sussex
- Military career
- Allegiance: United Kingdom
- Branch: British Army
- Rank: Lieutenant-general
- Units: Second Boer War; World War I
- Commands: Allahabad Brigade; Garhwal Brigade; Highland Division; Eastern Command; 2nd Army Central Force; 11th (Northern) Division; IV Corps
- Awards: Knight Grand Cross of the Order of the Bath; Knight Commander of the Order of St Michael and St George; Order of the White Eagle

Lieutenant-general Sir Charles Louis Woollcombe KCB KCMG (23 March 1857 – 6 May 1934) was a British Army General during World War I.

== Early life and education ==
Woollcombe was born in Devon, the eldest son of Rev. Louis Woollcombe, Rector of Petrockstowe, and Augusta Rundell Brown. He was educated at Marlborough College. After beginning a career as an accountant, he decided to join the military and in 1876 entered Royal Military College, Sandhurst. He was a member of the football teams at Marlborough and Sandhurst.

== Military career ==
Woollcombe originally served with the 1st Devon Militia, before obtaining a Regular commission in the 46th (South Devonshire) Regiment of Foot in 1876. In 1877, he transferred to the 25th Regiment of Foot, which was retitled as the King's Own Scottish Borderers in 1887. He took part in the Peshawar Valley expedition and the Khyber Line Force in Afghanistan between 1878 and 1880 and, promoted in 1886 to captain, in the Chin Lushai expedition in Burma between 1889 and 1890.

He was deputy assistant adjutant general for Musketry in Bengal from May 1890 and then brigade major for the Chitral Relief Force in Buram in 1895. He then served on the North West Frontier in India becoming assistant adjutant general of the Mohmand Field Force in 1897. He then took part in the Tirah expedition from 1897 to 1898 and then became assistant adjutant general in India in 1899.

He served in the Second Boer War in South Africa and then, after being promoted to lieutenant colonel on 9 June 1900 while serving on half-pay, became assistant adjutant general for musketry in India between 1901 and 1906. He was made a Companion of the Order of the Bath in the 1907 Birthday Honours in June 1907.

He became commander of the Allahabad Brigade in India in 1906, commander of the Garhwal Brigade in India in 1907 and, promoted to major general in April 1908, became general officer commanding (GOC) of the Highland Division in March 1911. In December 1913, while still GOC of his division, he was promoted to lieutenant general.

On the outbreak of the First World War he was appointed general officer commanding-in-chief of Eastern Command until 7 June 1915 when he became GOC-in-C of 2nd Army, Central Force. Then on 4 July 1916 he took command of 11th (Northern) Division on the Western Front (normally a major-general's command) until 1 December when he became GOC IV Corps. Finally on 29 June 1918 he returned to his post as GOC-in-C at Eastern Command: he was made a colonel commandant of the Royal Artillery in March 1919 and retired from the army in February 1920.

In September 1919, it was announced that he had been appointed Grand Officer of the Order of the Crown of Romania by the King of Romania "for distinguished services rendered during the course of the campaign" (i.e. the First World War).

== Personal life ==
In 1886, he married Agnes Meade Murray, youngest daughter of General Sir John Irvine Murray. They had two sons, Malcolm Louis and 2nd Lt. Charles Stephenson, and a daughter, Joan. The younger son was killed in action while serving with his father's regiment, the King's Own Scottish Borderers, at the Battle of La Bassée on 12 October 1914.

He died at his home, Chat Moss, Bexhill-on-Sea, Sussex.

Military offices
Preceded by Forbes MacBean	GOC Highland Division; 1911–1914	Succeeded by Colin Mackenzie
Preceded by Sir James Grierson	GOC-in-C Eastern Command; 1914–1915	Succeeded by Sir Leslie Rundle
Preceded by Edward Fanshawe	GOC 11th (Northern) Division; July–December 1916	Succeeded by Archibald Ritchie
Preceded by Henry Rawlinson	GOC IV Corps; 1916–1918	Succeeded by George Harper
Preceded by Sir William Robertson	GOC-in-C Eastern Command; 1918–1919	Succeeded by Lord Horne
Honorary titles
Preceded by Sir Frederick Forestier-Walker	Colonel of the King's Own Scottish Borderers; 1910–1923	Succeeded by Sir Douglas Haig
