= Khijri =

- Village
- Location in Jharkhand, India Khijri (India)
- Coordinates: 22.800109°N 84.9474203°E
- Country: India
- State: Jharkhand
- District: Gumla
- Elevation: 675 m (2,215 ft)

Population (2001)
  - Total: 15,400

Languages
  - Official: Hindi
- Time zone: UTC+5:30 (IST)
- Postal code: 835227
- Telephone code: 06528
- Vehicle registration: JH
- Sex Ratio: 1094:1000 ♂/♀

Khijri is a small village in Kamdara block in Gumla District of Jharkhand, India. It is a part of the Khijri constituency in the Legislative Assembly of Jharkhand. It is located south of the District headquarters at Gumla and 35 km from the state capital at Ranchi.

== Physiography ==
Khijri is surrounded by Murhu Block towards South, Karra Block towards west, Bandgaon Block towards South, Torpa Block towards west. Namkum, Ranchi, Barughutu are Chakradharpur are the nearby cities to Khijri.

== Demographics ==
Sadri language is the local language in Khijri.

== Transport ==
=== Rail ===
There is no railway station within 10 km of Khijri. However Kurkura railway station, which is 29 km from Khijri, is a major. It is connected through village road via Salgutu - Kurkura Road and Kurkura - Tetairtoli Road.

=== Roadways ===
Roads connecting minor towns are providing movement for passenger and freight traffic. There is a village road connecting Kurkura, Kurkura-Tetairtoli Road via Kulburu which meets Salgutu-Kurkura Road. Nearest State highway is Tamar-Khunti-Kolebira block road.

== Healthcare ==
To cater the medical needs of patients, especially those with tuberculosis, people go to:

- Govt. Hospital Namkum
- Ramkrishna Sanatorium

== Schools and colleges ==
For making children literate the state government provides:

- Government Upgraded Middle School,

== Place for worship ==
There is a Catholic church in the village, where villagers and nearby people come to attend mass.
