= Frederick Thomas Pelham =

Rear-Admiral Frederick Thomas Pelham CB
- Born: 2 August 1808
- Died: 21 June 1861 (aged 52); Hove, East Sussex
- Military career
- Allegiance: United Kingdom
- Branch: Royal Navy
- Service years: 1823 – 1861
- Rank: Rear-Admiral
- Commands: HMS Odin; HMS Blenheim; HMS Exmouth
- Conflicts: Crimean War
- Awards: Companion of the Order of the Bath

Rear-Admiral Frederick Thomas Pelham, CB (2 August 1808 – 21 June 1861) was a Royal Navy officer who went on to be Second Naval Lord.

== Career ==
He was the son of Thomas Pelham, 2nd Earl of Chichester (1756–1826), and Lady Mary Henrietta Juliana Osborne (1776–1862), and entered the navy on 27 June 1823.

=== Active Service ===
He first served as a midshipman on HMS Sybille in the Mediterranean (including an attack on Greek pirates), was promoted to lieutenant in 1830, before serving with HMS Ferret, until being promoted to commander on 21 September 1835. He then served at that rank on HMS Castor off Spain's north coast during the Carlist War before receiving his first command, HMS Tweed, in the same theatre in 1837 and 1838, being awarded the cross of San Fernando for his services. He rose to captain on 3 July 1840 and then commanded HMS Odin, a steam paddle frigate, in the Mediterranean Sea from 1847 to 1850.

At the suggestion of Sir Hyde Parker, he served as private secretary to the first Lord of the Admiralty, the Duke of Northumberland, from March to December 1852, working against a government keen to keep defence spending down, against his own brother Lord Chichester's politics and connections with Sir Francis Baring, and against the political secretary Stafford O'Brien (testifying to the 1853 select committee checking O'Brien's handling of patronage in dockyard appointments). He was made commander of the Portsmouth steam reserve in 1853, participating at Bomarsund and other episodes of the 1854 Baltic campaign in that role from his flagship HMS Blenheim. During the construction of HMS Exmouth he was appointed her commander, but this putative post was cancelled when his friend Richard Saunders Dundas selected him for the second Baltic campaign as captain of the fleet. In that role he headed the attack on Sveaborg (8–10 August), though a surveying officer on the expedition, Captain Bartholomew James Sulivan, blamed Pelham for making Dundas overcautious.

=== Admiralty Service ===
In 1855, he was appointed a Companion of the Order of the Bath.

Initially Sir Maurice Berkeley declined to take Pelham on at the Board of Admiralty, in December 1856, due to his connections with Northumberland, however Pelham joined the Board the following November as Fourth Naval Lord after Berkeley's retirement, though left it four months later, in March 1858, having been promoted to rear admiral. Under Dundas and the Duke of Somerset he joined the new Liberal board as Second Naval Lord in June 1859, remaining with it until resigning on grounds of ill health in early June 1861.

== Death ==
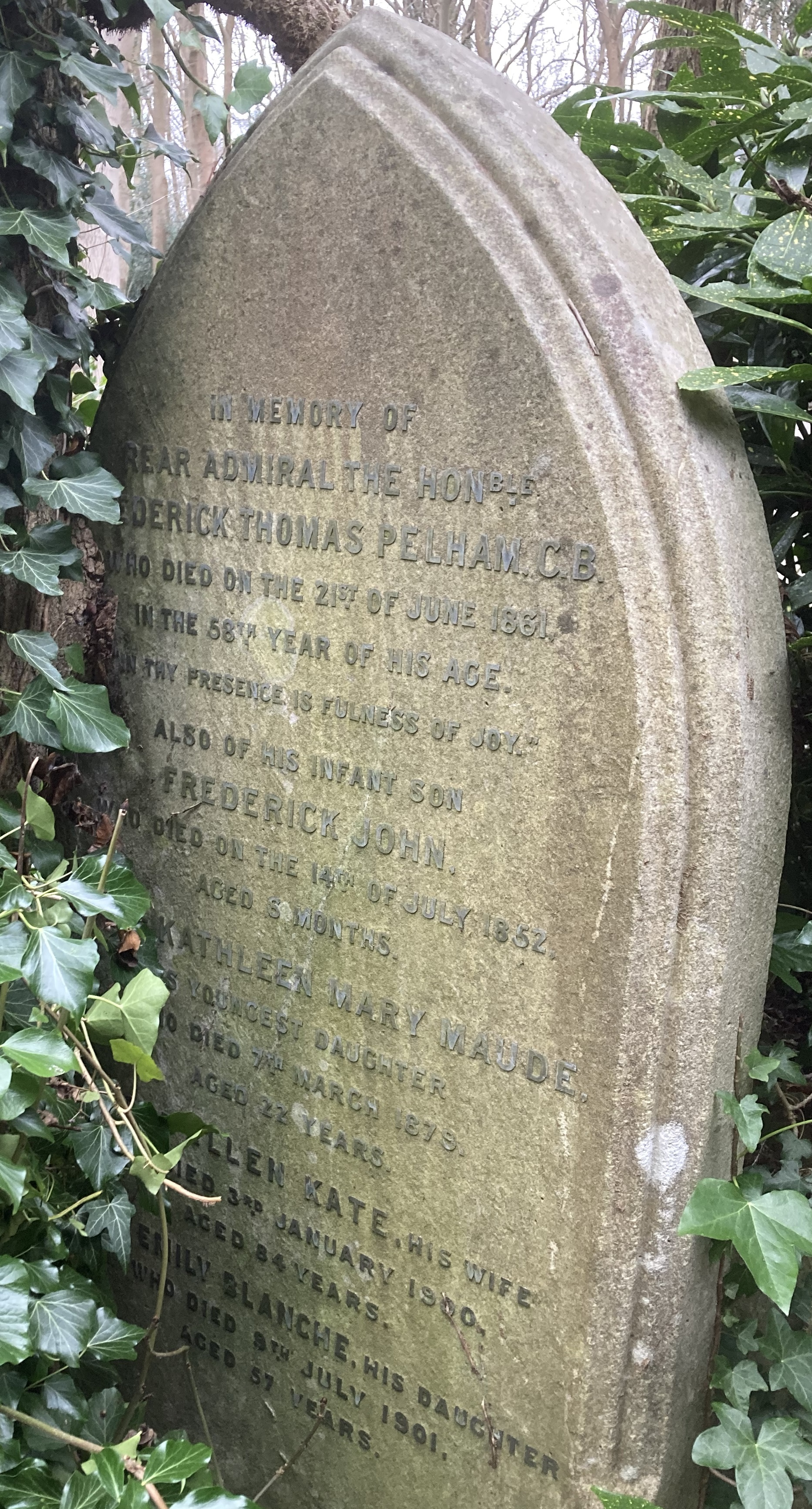
Grave of Frederick Thomas Pelham in Highgate Cemetery

He died on 21 June 1861 and was buried on the western side of Highgate cemetery.

== Family ==
He married Ellen Kate Mitchell on 26 July 1841, with whom he had:

- Constance Mary Kate Pelham (died 5 January 1926)
- Beatrice Emily Julia Pelham (died 27 February 1939)
- Admiral Frederick Sidney Pelham (25 October 1854 – 19 October 1931)

== See also ==
- O'Byrne, William Richard (1849). "Pelham, Frederick Thomas" . A Naval Biographical Dictionary . John Murray – via Wikisource.

Military offices
| Preceded by Sir Alexander Milne | Fourth Naval Lord; 1857–1858 | Succeeded by Sir James Drummond |
| Preceded by Sir Richard Dundas | Second Naval Lord; 1859–1861 | Succeeded by Sir Charles Eden |
