= William King-Hall =

Royal Navy Admiral (1816–1886)

Admiral Sir William King-Hall KCB
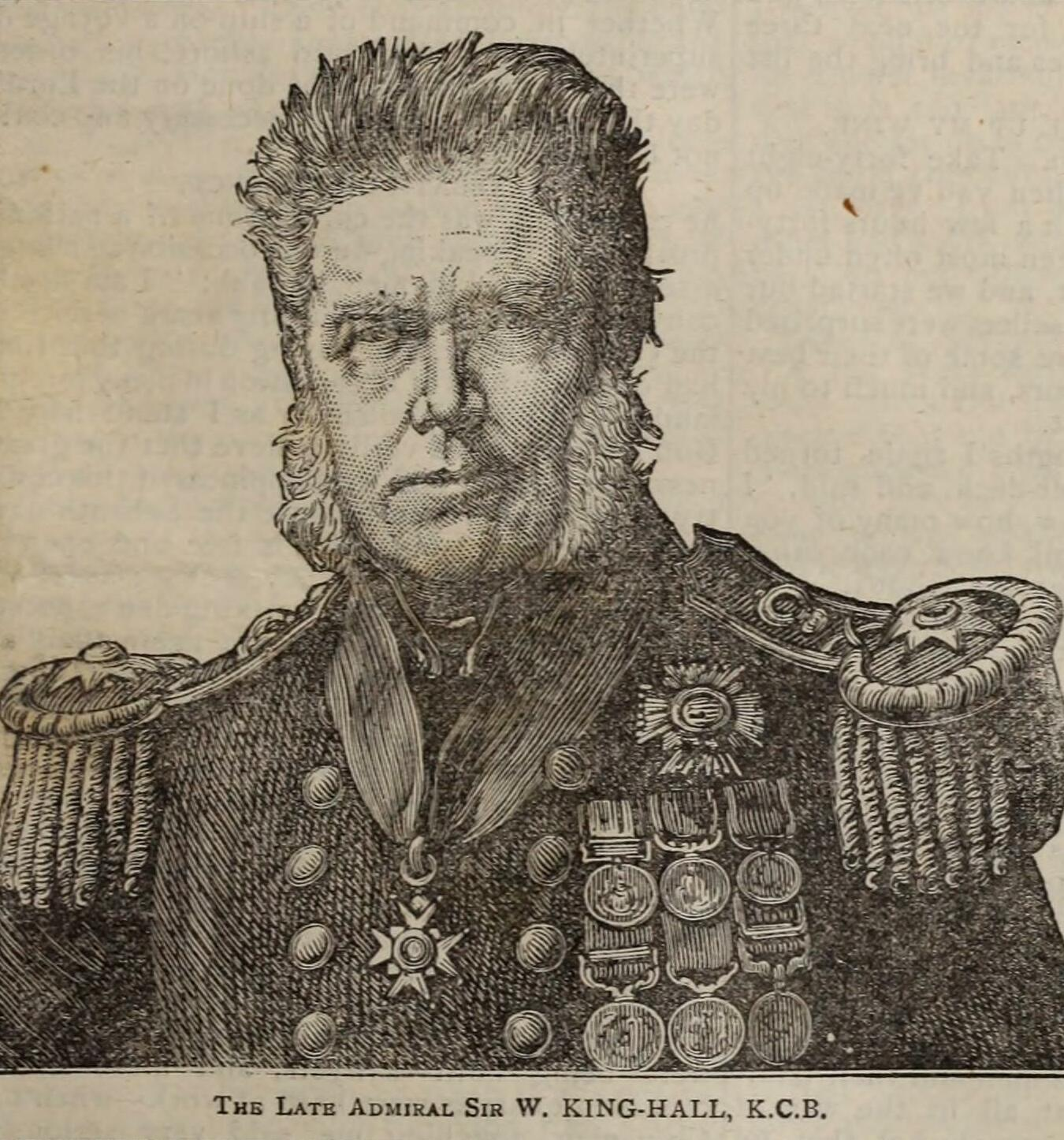
- The Late Admiral Sir William King-Hall. Christian Herald 1886
- Born: 11 March 1816
- Died: 29 July 1886 (aged 70)
- Military career
- Allegiance: United Kingdom
- Branch: Royal Navy
- Service years: 1829–1881
- Rank: Admiral
- Commands: Nore Command; HMS Cumberland; HMS Russell; HMS Royal Adelaide; HMS Indus; HMS Calcutta; HMS Exmouth; HMS Bulldog
- Conflicts: Crimean War; Second Opium War
- Awards: Knight Commander of the Order of the Bath

Admiral Sir William King-Hall, KCB (11 March 1816 – 29 July 1886) was a Royal Navy officer who served as Commander-in-Chief, The Nore from 1877 to 1879.

== Naval career ==
King-Hall joined the Royal Navy in 1829, and took part in operations off the coast of Syria in 1840. Promoted to captain in 1853 he commanded HMS Bulldog during the bombardment and capture of Fort Bomarsund and then commanded HMS Exmouth during the attack on the Fortress of Sveaborg near Helsinki during the Crimean War.

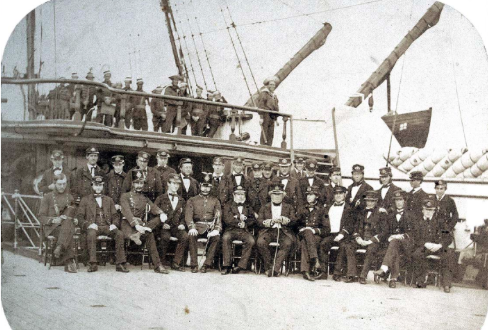
Captain William King-Hall and crew, HMS Indus, Halifax, Nova Scotia, 1860

King-Hall also commanded HMS Calcutta during the Second Opium War and took part in the first attack on Canton in late 1856 and then the assault on the Taku Forts in 1858. He later commanded HMS Indus, HMS Royal Adelaide, HMS Russell and then HMS Cumberland.

King-Hall was appointed Superintendent of Sheerness dockyard in 1865, Superintendent of Devonport dockyard in 1871 and Commander-in-Chief, The Nore in 1877 before retiring in 1881.

== Family ==
In 1848 King-Hall married Louisa Forman and in 1880 he married Charlotte Tillotson (née Simpson): they had two sons (Admiral Sir Sir George King-Hall and Admiral Sir Herbert King-Hall) and one daughter.

There is a tablet in his memory at St Annes Church in Sutton Bonnington, Nottinghamshire.

== See also ==
- O'Byrne, William Richard (1849). "Hall, William King" . A Naval Biographical Dictionary . John Murray – via Wikisource.

Military offices
Preceded by Sir Henry Chads	Commander-in-Chief, The Nore; 1877–1879	Succeeded by Sir Reginald Macdonald
