= HMS Indus (1839) =

Ship of the line of the Royal Navy

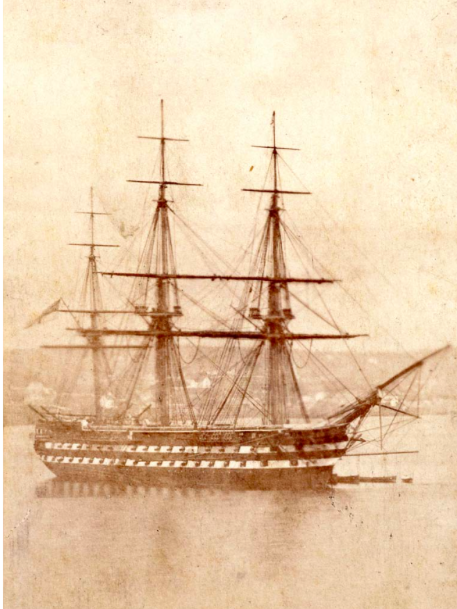
- HMS Indus, flagship, at Halifax, Nova Scotia 1858–1860

History

United Kingdom
- Name: HMS Indus
- Ordered: 18 May 1820
- Builder: Portsmouth Dockyard
- Laid down: July 1824
- Launched: 16 March 1839
- Fate: Sold, 1898

General characteristics
- Class & type: 80-gun second-rate ship of the line
- Tons burthen: 2095 bm
- Length: 188 ft 6 in (57.45 m) (gundeck)
- Beam: 50 ft 5 in (15.37 m)
- Depth of hold: 22 ft 6 in (6.86 m)
- Propulsion: Sails
- Sail plan: Full-rigged ship
- Armament: 80 guns: Gundeck: 28 × 32-pdrs, 2 × 68-pdr carronades; Upper gundeck: 32 × 24-pdrs; Quarterdeck: 4 × 12-pdrs, 10 × 32-pdr carronades; Forecastle: 2 × 12-pdrs, 2 × 32-pdr carronades

HMS Indus was an 80-gun two-deck second-rate ship of the line of the Royal Navy, launched on 16 March 1839 at Portsmouth Dockyard.

The design of Indus was based upon the Danish Christian VII, captured during the Second Battle of Copenhagen. She was originally ordered in 1817 as a 74-gun ship, but the order was amended in 1820 to an 80-gunner.

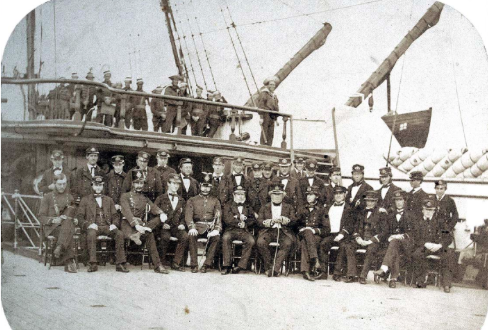
Officers and crew, HMS Indus, Halifax, Nova Scotia, 1860

She was attached to the Mediterranean fleet, and commanded by Captain Houston Stewart until 30 October 1840, when Captain James Stirling took over as captain, serving until June 1844. Captain John Charles Dalrymple Hay had her until 25 November 1856, during which time she served as Rear-Admiral Houston Stewart's flagship, based at Devonport. Captain William King-Hall was her next commander, and she continued to serve as Houston Stewart's flagship, now on the North American and West Indian stations.

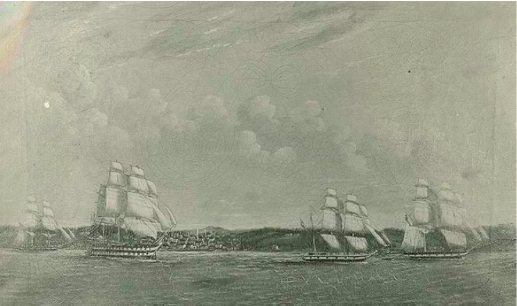
HMS Indus and squadron leaving Halifax Harbour, 1858

In 1860 Indus was converted to serve as a guardship. She was sold out of the service in 1898.
