= Charles Shadwell (Royal Navy officer) =

Royal Navy Admiral (1814–1886)

Admiral Sir Charles Shadwell KCB FRS
- Born: 31 January 1814
- Died: 1 March 1886 (aged 72); Melksham, Wiltshire
- Military career
- Allegiance: United Kingdom
- Branch: Royal Navy
- Service years: 1827–1879
- Rank: Admiral
- Commands: HMS Sphinx; HMS Highflyer; HMS Aboukir; HMS Hastings; China Station; Royal Naval College, Greenwich
- Conflicts: Second Opium War
- Awards: Knight Commander of the Order of the Bath

Admiral Sir Charles Frederick Alexander Shadwell KCB FRS (31 January 1814 – 1 March 1886) was a Royal Navy officer who went on to be Commander-in-Chief, China Station.

== Naval career ==
Born the fourth son of Sir Lancelot Shadwell, Charles Shadwell joined the Royal Navy in 1827. He was present during operations off Syria in 1840. In 1850 he became Commander in HMS Sphinx and took part in the Second Anglo-Burmese War.

Promoted to captain in 1853, he commanded HMS Highflyer from 1856 and took part in the capture of Canton and the Battle of Taku Forts during the Second Opium War. He commanded HMS Aboukir from 1861 and HMS Hastings from 1862.

Shadwell was appointed Captain-Superintendent of Gosport victualling-yard in 1864, promoted to rear admiral in 1869 and appointed Commander-in-Chief, China Station in 1871. He was elected a Fellow of the Royal Society in 1861. In 1875 he was promoted to vice admiral. In 1878 he was made President of the Royal Naval College, Greenwich. He was placed on the retired list in 1879.

Shadwell was appointed a Knight Commander of the Order of the Bath (KCB) in the 1873 Birthday Honours.

He retired in 1879 and in retirement lived at Meadow Bank in Melksham in Wiltshire. He died unmarried in 1886.

== See also ==
- O'Byrne, William Richard (1849). "Shadwell, Charles Frederick Alexander" . A Naval Biographical Dictionary . John Murray – via Wikisource.

Military offices
Preceded by Sir Henry Kellett	Commander-in-Chief, China Station; 1871–1874	Succeeded by Sir Alfred Ryder
Preceded by Sir Edward Fanshawe	President, Royal Naval College, Greenwich; 1878–1881	Succeeded by Sir Geoffrey Hornby
