= HMS Odin (1846) =

Frigate of the Royal Navy

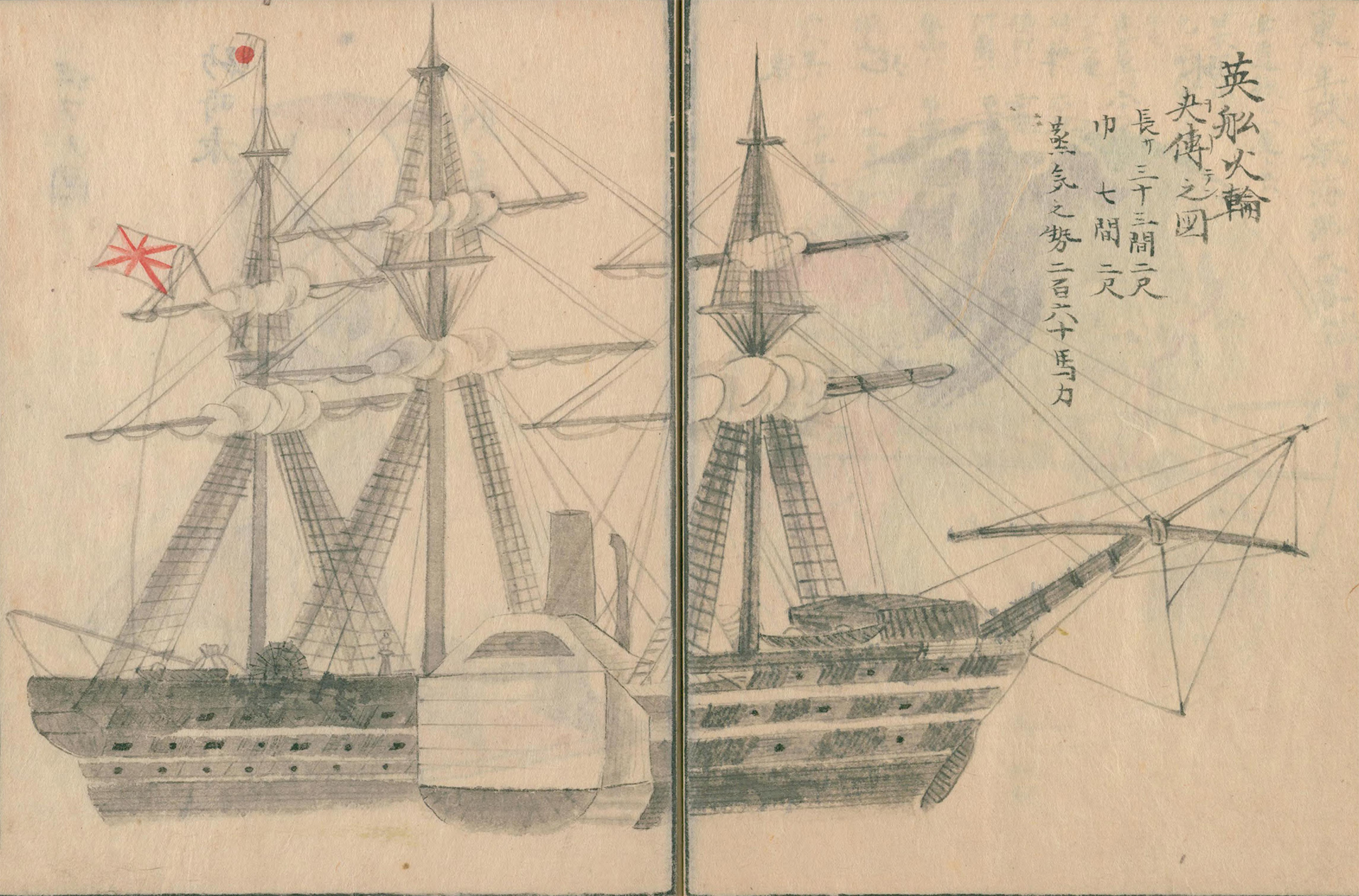
- HMS Odin, the first Japanese envoy left Shinagawa Port, Tokyo for Europe on 22 January 1862.

History

United Kingdom
- Name: HMS Odin
- Ordered: 19 February 1844
- Builder: Deptford Dockyard; William Fairbairn
- Laid down: February 1845
- Launched: 24 July 1846
- Completed: By 12 August 1847
- Fate: Sold in 1865

General characteristics
- Tons burthen: 1,301 73/94 bm
- Length: 208 ft (63 m) (overall); 183 ft 8.5 in (55.994 m) (keel)
- Beam: 37 ft (11 m)
- Depth of hold: 24 ft (7.32 m)
- Propulsion: 2-cyl. (88½in diam., 5¾ft stroke) vertical direct-acting engine; 4 tubular boilers; 560 nhp; 500 tons coal
- Speed: 10 knots (19 km/h)
- Complement: 175
- Armament: 16 × guns: 2 × 68 pdr; 10 × 32 pdrs; 4 × 10 in guns

HMS Odin was a steam-powered first-class paddle frigate of the Royal Navy. She was launched in 1846 and was used in the Baltic theatre of the Crimean War.

The ship was launched on 24 July 1846, at 1,301 73/94 bm, and decommissioned in 1865. She was sold that year to Castle & Beech for breaking up. She was initially intended to carry eight 32pdr carronades on the middle deck, but this idea was later discarded and these guns were never fitted. Between 1850 and 1851 she was outfitted for an Ambassador.

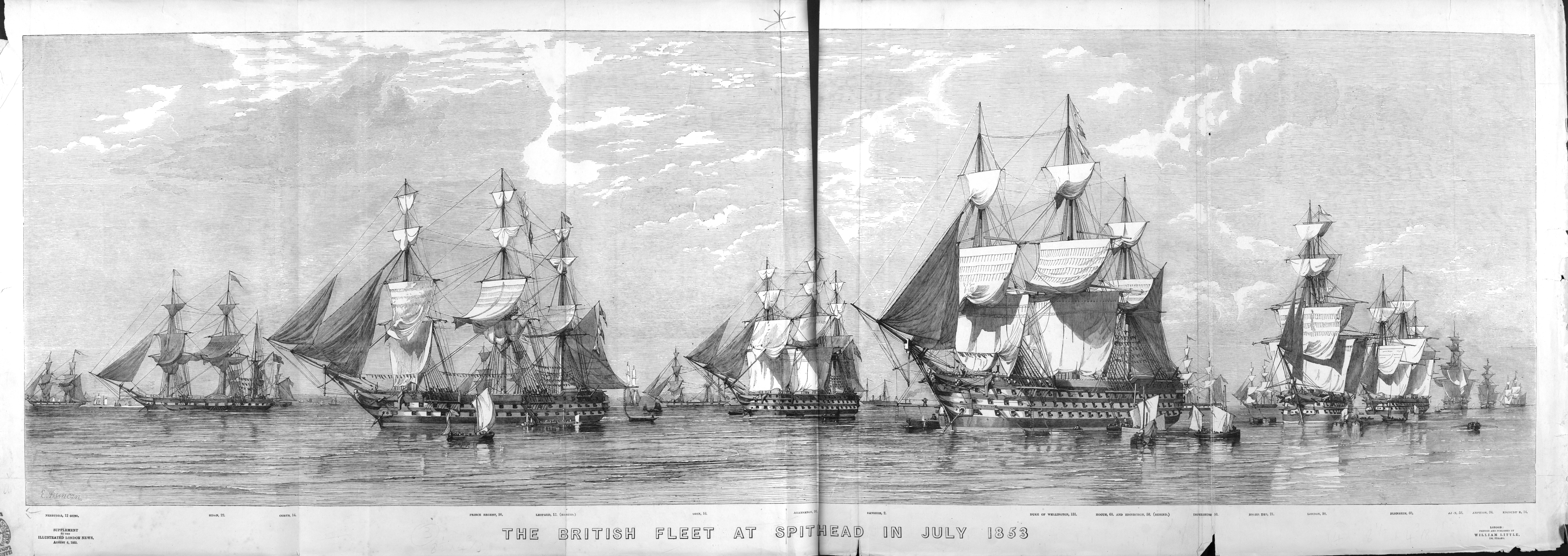
Odin at the Spithead Fleet Review on 15 July 1853

On 22 December 1862 (21 January 1862), the First Japanese Embassy to Europe (1862) departed Shinagawa Port in Tokyo for Europe.

The ship had six commanders during her operational lifetime. Captain Frederick Thomas Pelham took command at her commissioning at Portsmouth on 24 May 1847. He paid her off at Portsmouth and was succeeded by Commander William Saltonstall Wiseman, who took over on 1 August 1851, until October 1851. Captain Francis Scott was in command from 18 December 1852 until 3 February 1855, Captain James Willcox took over on 7 September 1855 and Captain Lord John Hay commanded Odin from 20 September 1859 until 1863.

== See also ==
- First Japanese Embassy to Europe (1862)

== Sources ==
- Colledge, J. J.; Warlow, Ben (2006) [1969]. Ships of the Royal Navy: The Complete Record of All Fighting Ships of the Royal Navy from the 15th Century to the Present (3rd Rev ed.). London: Chatham Publishing. ISBN 978-1-86176-281-8. OCLC 67375475.
- Lyon, David and Winfield, Rif, The Sail and Steam Navy List, All the Ships of the Royal Navy 1815-1889, pub Chatham, 2004, ISBN 1-86176-032-9
- Southport Visiter, 9 March 1854
