= James Robert Drummond =

Royal Navy Admiral (1812–1895)

Admiral The Honourable Sir James Robert Drummond GCB
- Born: 15 September 1812
- Died: 7 October 1895 (aged 83)
- Relatives: Major General Laurence Drummond (son)
- Military career
- Allegiance: United Kingdom
- Branch: Royal Navy
- Service years: 1826–1877
- Rank: Admiral
- Commands: Mediterranean Fleet; HMS Maeander; HMS Victory; HMS Albion; HMS Tribune; HMS Retribution; HMS Scout
- Conflicts: Crimean War
- Awards: Knight Grand Cross of the Order of the Bath

Admiral Sir James Robert Drummond GCB (15 September 1812 – 7 October 1895) was a Royal Navy officer who commanded several ships in the Black Sea Fleet during the Crimean War and who commanded the Mediterranean Fleet from 1874 to 1877 before going on to be Fourth Naval Lord.

== Naval career ==
Born the second of the eight children of James Drummond, 8th Viscount Strathallan and Lady Amelia Sophia Drummond (née Murray), Drummond joined the Royal Navy on 2 February 1826. He was promoted to lieutenant on 27 December 1832, and to commander on 9 June 1838.

As a commander he took command of the 18-gun sailing sloop HMS Scout in the Mediterranean in 1841. Promoted to captain in 1846, in 1852 he took charge of the 1st-Class wooden paddle-frigate HMS Retribution, which had 10-guns and also served in the Mediterranean. Under his command the Retribution, which was listed as having 28 guns, participated in the first bombardment of Sevastopol on 17 October 1854 during the Crimean War. During the bombardment, Retribution towed or was coupled broadside to the 120-gun sailing line-of-battle ship HMS Trafalgar.

Later that year, Drummond was appointed captain of the 31-gun wooden screw-corvette HMS Tribune, and the following year to the 2nd rate, 2-decker 90-gun sail line of battle ship HMS Albion, both of which ships formed part of the Black Sea Fleet. In March 1856 he became Captain of HMS Victory, flagship of Vice Admiral George Francis Seymour, Portsmouth, and in December of that year he was transferred to the 5th-rate 44-gun sailing frigate HMS Maeander, for coast guard service.

In May 1857 Drummond was appointed Private Secretary to Sir Charles Wood, the First Lord of the Admiralty and was then himself appointed Fourth Naval Lord from March 1858. In December 1858 he was appointed as Commodore in HMS Fisgard, as Commander-in-Chief, Woolwich. Fisgard was an old 5th-rate 46-gun sailing frigate, which had been hulked in 1847. Captain Drummond was again Fourth Naval Lord from June 1861 to July 1866, and was promoted to Rear Admiral in January 1864.

He was appointed a Knight Commander of the Order of the Bath on 24 May 1873, and was promoted to vice admiral on 2 June 1877. He commanded the Mediterranean Fleet from 13 January 1874 to 15 January 1877. His flagship was initially HMS Lord Warden and later HMS Hercules. He was promoted to admiral on 22 January 1877 and retired on 16 September 1877, the day after his 65th birthday. He was appointed a Knight Grand Cross of the Order of the Bath on 23 April 1880. In retirement he served as Gentleman Usher of the Black Rod.

== Family ==
Drummond married Catherine Francis Elliot, daughter of Admiral Sir George Elliot and Eliza Cecilia Ness, on 5 February 1856. They had one child, Laurence George Drummond, born on 13 March 1861, who became a soldier. Catherine Drummond died on 20 April 1914.

== See also ==
- O'Byrne, William Richard (1849). "Drummond, James Robert" . A Naval Biographical Dictionary . John Murray – via Wikisource.

Military offices
Preceded by Sir Frederick Pelham	Fourth Naval Lord; 1858–1859	Succeeded by Sir Swynfen Carnegie
Preceded by Charles Frederick	Fourth Naval Lord; 1861–1866	Succeeded by Sir John Dalrymple-Hay
Preceded by Sir Hastings Yelverton	Commander-in-Chief, Mediterranean Fleet; 1874–1877	Succeeded by Sir Geoffrey Hornby
Government offices
Preceded by Sir William Knollys	Black Rod; 1883–1895	Succeeded by Sir Michael Biddulph
