= Thomas Saumarez (Royal Navy officer) =

Royal Navy Admiral (1827–1903)

Thomas Saumarez CB (1827–1903) was a British naval captain. He is known for his actions in the Second Opium War.

== Early life ==
One of the Saumarez naval family originating in Guernsey, he was born on 31 March 1827 at Sutton, Surrey, the son of Richard Saumarez R.N. and Anne Ellson, and a great-nephew of James Saumarez, 1st Baron de Saumarez. After education at the Western Grammar School, Brompton, he entered the Royal Navy in 1841.

Saumarez as a midshipman served on the east coast of South America, and was promoted lieutenant in March 1848. He served mainly on the west coast of Africa, where on 31 March 1851 he saved a man from drowning and received the Royal Humane Society's silver medal. Later that year he commanded a division of gunboats at Lagos and was severely wounded.

== The Cormorant and the Forte ==
In September 1854 Saumarez was promoted to commander. In May 1858 he had command of HMS Cormorant, a Vigilant-class gunvessel, and served with at the capture of the Dagu forts, in the Second Opium War. The Cormorant led the attack and broke through a boom. Her first broadside, simultaneously, dismounted the largest of the Chinese guns. He then took part in the operations in the Hai River and in the occupation of Tianjin. At Ningbo he carried out a detailed investigation into the local Christian missionary work.

Saumarez was promoted to the rank of captain, on 27 July 1858. He then served as captain of HMS Forte, a steam frigate and flagship to Richard Laird Warren, on the east coast of South America in 1861. A diplomatic incident occurred after Brazilian police arrested officers from the Forte at Tijuca; in a strained atmosphere, it contributed to a breaking-off of diplomatic relations between Brazil and the United Kingdom, and helped end the career of William Dougal Christie. Saumarez and the gunboat HMS Sheldrake were heavily involved in this "Christie crisis".

== Later life ==
On 12 April 1870 Saumarez was retired, and he was nominated a C.B. in 1873. He became by seniority a rear-admiral in 1876, vice-admiral in 1881, and admiral in 1886. He resided at 2 Morpeth Mansions, Westminster, and died at Ramsgate on 22 January 1903.

== Family ==
Saumarez married (1) in 1854 Agnes Jean Block, daughter (d. 1866) of S. R. Block of Greenhill, Barnet; and (2) in 1868, Eleanor, daughter of B. Scott Riley, of Liverpool. He left no issue.
