= John Irvine Murray =

Sir John Irvine Murray
- Born: Sir John Irvine Murray; 31 July 1826; Roxburghshire, Scotland
- Died: 20 May 1902 (aged 75); Kensington, London, England
- Burial place: Highgate Cemetery
- Relatives: Sir Charles Woollcombe (son-in-law)
- Military career
- Allegiance: United Kingdom
- Branch: British Army
- Rank: General
- Commands: 14th Murray's Jat Lancers
- Awards: Knight Grand Cross of the Order of the Bath

General Sir John Irvine Murray, KCB (31 July 1826 – 20 May 1902) was a Scottish commanding officer of the British Indian Army.

== Career ==
Murray was the son of James Murray of Denholm and Margaret Irvine.

He joined the British Indian Army in 1842, serving in the Punjabi campaign of 1848–49. During the Indian Rebellion of 1857, while a captain serving with the Gwalior Contingent, he raised and commanded the famed "Murray's Jat Lancers" (later known as the 14th Bengal Lancers). His regiment participated in a number of actions in 1857–58, especially at Meerut, Delhi and Lucknow.

Murray's Lancers subsequently served in the Bhutan Field Force and formed part of the cavalry brigade of the Kabul Field Force during the 1878–79 Afghanistan War. In the second Oudh campaign and the operations on the Nepal frontier, he was in command of the regiment, and commanded a column in the final operations in Nepal.

He was mentioned in despatches three times, and promoted to the brevet rank of major. For his services in the Bhutan War, 1864–65, he was appointed a Companion or the Order of the Bath (CB) in the 1873 Birthday Honours. He retired after commanding the Lahore division and was knighted in the same order (KCB) in the 1897 Diamond Jubilee Honours.

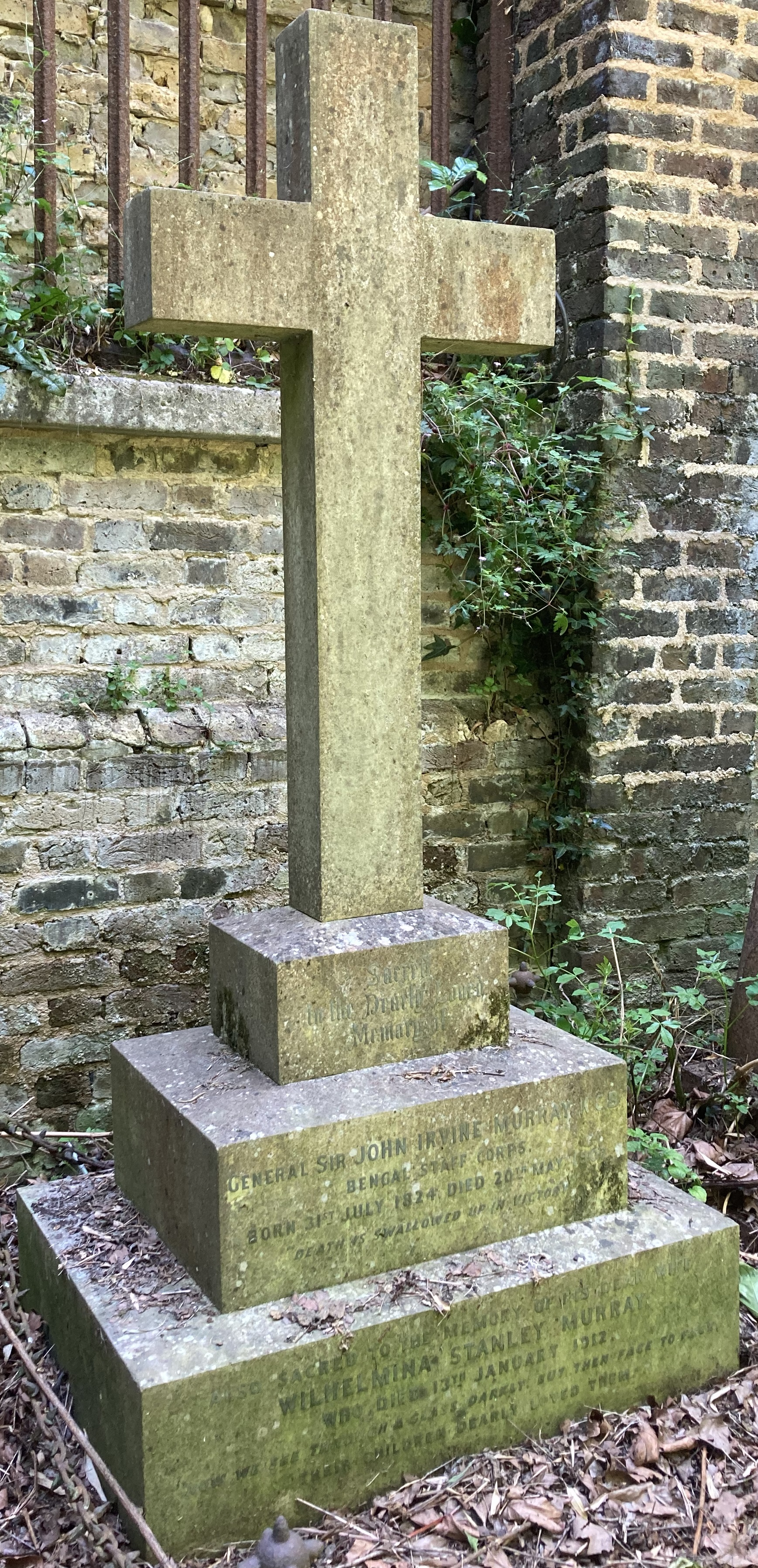
Grave of John Irvine Murray in Highgate Cemetery

== Personal life ==
In 1854, he married Wilhelmina Stanley Malcolm, daughter of Duncan Archibald Malcolm and Caroline Charlotte Stanley. They had two sons and four daughters. Their eldest son, Lt. Archibald Ross Murray, served in the Afghan War but died of cholera in 1879 at Tret Punjab.

Their daughter Agnes Meade Murray married Lt.-Gen. Sir Charles Woollcombe, and had two sons and a daughter. Agnes's younger son was killed in action in the First World War while serving with the King's Own Scottish Borderers at the Battle of La Bassée. Their daughter, Brigadier Mary Stewart Murray OBE of the Salvation Army, was decorated for her work in the Second Boer War and was awarded the Mons Star in the First World War.

He died in 1902 and was buried on the western side of Highgate Cemetery.
