= Albion-class ship of the line (1842) =

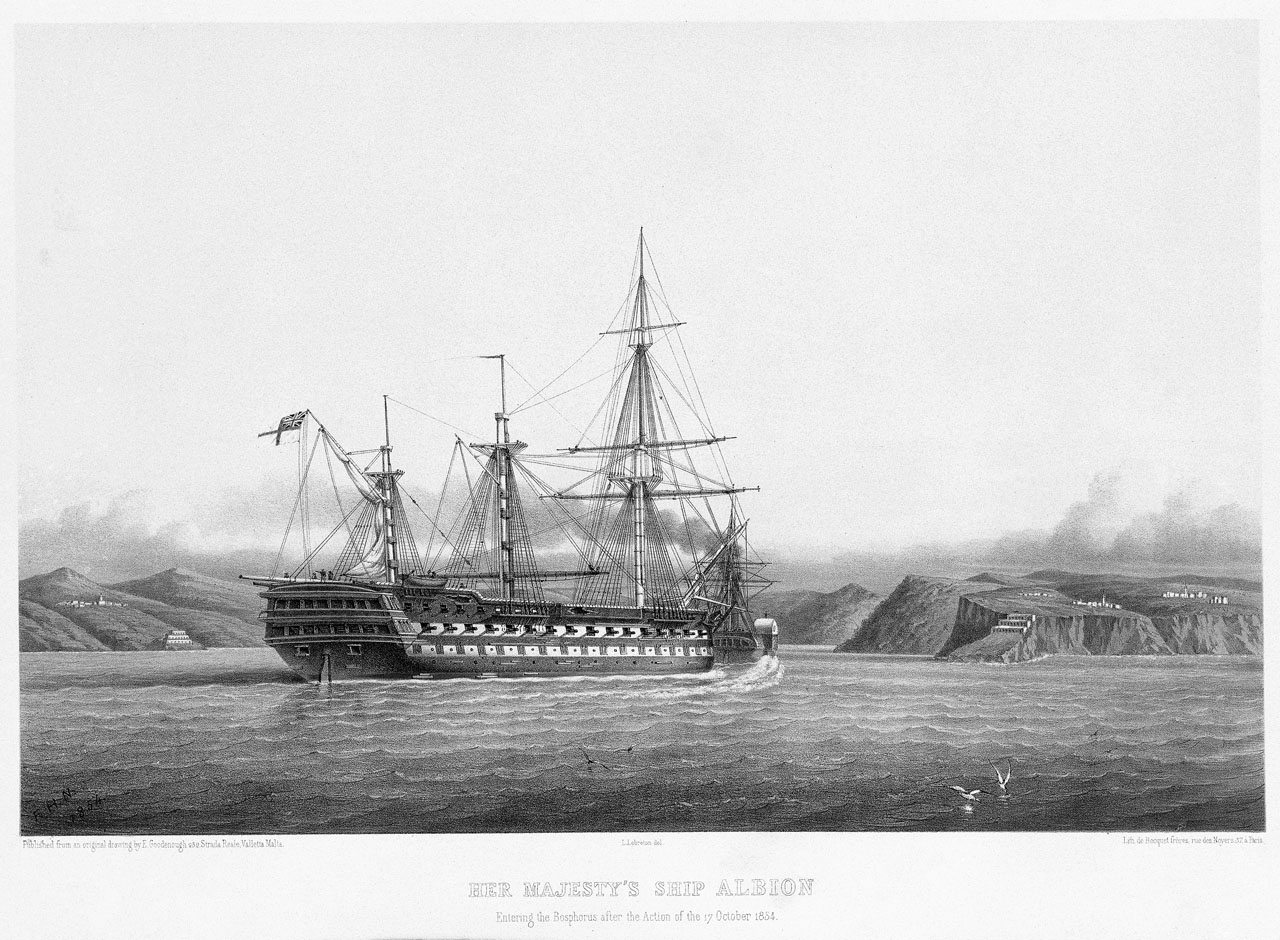
- Her Majesty's Ship Albion entering the Bosphorus after the action of 17 October 1854.

Class overview
- Name: Albion
- Operators: Royal Navy
- Preceded by: Rodney class
- Succeeded by: None
- In service: 6 September 1842
- Planned: 5
- Completed: 3

General characteristics
- Type: 90-gun, second-rate, ship of the line
- Tons burthen: 3,099 70/94 (bm)
- Length: 204 ft (62.2 m) (gun deck)
- Beam: 56 ft 9 in (17.3 m)
- Depth of hold: 23 ft 8 in (7.2 m)
- Sail plan: Full-rigged ship
- Complement: 820 (wartime)
- Armament: 90 muzzle-loading, smoothbore guns: Lower gun deck: 28 × 32 pdr guns + 4 × 68 pdr carronades; Upper gun deck: 26 × 32 pdr guns + 6 × 8 in (203 mm) shell guns; Forecastle & Quarterdeck: 24 × 32 pdr guns + 2 × 8 in shell guns

The Albion-class ships of the line were a class of 90-gun, second rates, designed for the Royal Navy by Sir William Symonds. The first two were originally ordered in March 1840 as 80-gun ships of the Vanguard class, but were re-ordered to a new design of 90 guns some three months later. Three more ships to this design were ordered in March 1840, but two of these (Princess Royal and Hannibal) were re-ordered to fresh designs in 1847.

== Ships ==
- HMS Albion

Builder: Plymouth Dockyard
Ordered: 18 March 1839
Launched: 6 September 1842
Fate: Broken up, 1884

- HMS Aboukir

Builder: Plymouth Dockyard
Ordered: 18 March 1839
Launched: 4 April 1848
Fate: Broken up, 1878

- HMS Exmouth

Builder: Plymouth Dockyard
Ordered: 12 March 1840
Launched: 12 July 1854
Fate: Broken up, 1905
