= Kurkura =

- Town
- Location in Jharkhand, India Kurkura (India)
- Coordinates: 22.80°N 84.92°E
- Country: India
- State: Jharkhand
- District: Gumla
- Elevation: 465 m (1,526 ft)

Population (2001)
  - Total: 900

Languages
  - Official: Hindi
- Time zone: UTC+5:30 (IST)
- Postal code: 835201
- Telephone code: +91-01-XXXXXX
- Vehicle registration: JH07
- Sex Ratio: 996:1000 ♂/♀

Kurkura is a town and a municipal committee in Gumla district in the Indian state of Jharkhand. The town is located about 143 km from Ranchi on National Highway 1 and is well connected to rail routes as well.

== Geography ==
Kurkura is located at 22°48′16″N 84°55′16″E southern Jharkhand.

== Transport ==
Kurkura is well connected via Rail and Road routes.

=== Railway ===
By rail it is on the main BG line that connects the Ranchi to Rourkela. Kurkura is now well connected with major cities of India via rail routes and one of the most profitable station in South Eastern Railways. Kurkura railway station with station code KRKR.

== Roadways ==
Kurakura is well connected to other cities by district road Salgutu — Kurkura Road.
