= Laurence Drummond =

British Army general (1861–1946)

Major-General Laurence Drummond CB CMG MVO DL JP
- Drummond in 1919
- Born: 13 March 1861
- Died: 20 May 1946 (aged 85)
- Relatives: Admiral Sir James Robert Drummond (father); Eustace Percy (son-in-law)
- Military career
- Allegiance: United Kingdom
- Branch: British Army
- Service years: 1879–1920
- Rank: Major-General
- Unit: Coldstream Guards
- Commands: Kimberley Mounted Infantry; 7th Infantry Brigade
- Conflicts: Bechuanaland Expedition; Fourth Anglo-Ashanti War; Soudan Expedition; Second Boer War; First World War
- Awards: Companion of the Order of the Bath; Commander of the Order of the British Empire; Member of the Royal Victorian Order; Mentioned in Despatches
- Other work: Justice of the Peace, Kent

Major-General Laurence George Drummond, CB, CBE, MVO, DL, JP (13 March 1861 – 20 May 1946) was a British Army officer.

Drummond saw active service in the Bechuanaland Expedition (1884–1885), the Fourth Anglo-Ashanti War (1895–1896), the Soudan Expedition, the Second Boer War, and the Great War of 1914–1918, and retired to Kent in 1920 to become a magistrate and a keen gardener.

== Early life ==
The only son of Admiral Sir James Robert Drummond, a younger son of Viscount Strathallan, by his marriage to Catherine Frances Elliot, Drummond was educated at Eton College and from 1874 to 1877 was second Page of Honour to Queen Victoria.

== Military career ==
After training at the Royal Military College, Sandhurst, Drummond was commissioned as a second lieutenant into the Coldstream Guards on 13 August 1879, but in September transferred to the Scots Guards.

Drummond saw active service on the Bechuanaland Expedition of 1884–1885 in command of a troop of Methuen's Horse, and on 3 May 1886, on his return from Bechuanaland, the Duke of Connaught presented him to his brother the Prince of Wales at a Levée at St James's Palace. The next day, 5 May 1886, Drummond married Katherine Mary Antrobus, the daughter of Hugh Lindsay Antrobus and Mary Adam and a granddaughter of Admiral Sir Charles Adam.

Drummond was promoted captain in 1888. From 1892 to 1897 he served as aide-de-camp to the Major-General commanding the Home District, during which period he commanded a Guards Company in the Special Service Corps and saw active service again on the Ashantee Expedition of 1895–1896, gaining the Ashanti Star, and in 1897 was promoted major. In 1898 he joined the Soudan Expedition, when he was mentioned in despatches and decorated with the Queen's Medal and the Egyptian Medal. From 1898 to 1900 he was posted to Ottawa as Military Secretary to the Governor-General of Canada, the Earl of Minto, but he interrupted this posting in 1899 to return to South Africa, accompanying a Canadian contingent joining the war. One historian has said of Drummond's interlude in Canada –

Minto's military secretary, Laurence Drummond, a close friend and sporting companion, might have proven invaluable had he remained in Ottawa and put his mind to the task. But he, too, lacked previous administrative and political experience.

Drummond commanded the Kimberley Mounted Infantry from 1899 to 1900, being again mentioned in despatches and serving as a staff officer with the 1st Division. After the Boer War he was appointed Assistant Staff Officer to the inspector general of the Forces, then in 1904 was promoted lieutenant-colonel (later the same year brevet colonel) commanding the 3rd Battalion, Scots Guards. He was then, at his own request, placed on half-pay and was promoted to colonel in January 1908 He reverted to normal pay in October when he was promoted to the temporary rank of brigadier general and took command of the 3rd (UK) Division's 7th Infantry Brigade, taking over from Hubert Hamilton.

He retained command of the brigade until October 1912 when he was again placed on half-pay and, relinquishing his temporary brigadier's rank, reverting to his substantive rank of colonel. In February 1913 he was promoted major general.

He served in the First World War of 1914–1918, initially as commander of the 19th Infantry Brigade, when he was again mentioned in despatches but held no divisional commands. He was returned to Britain and appointed an inspector of infantry on 28 September. He was placed in command of a reserve centre in June 1915 and retired from the service in 1920.

With his wife Katherine Mary (née Antrobus), Drummond had four children: Lindsay Drummond (1891–1951), Stella Katherine Drummond (1895–1982), Esme Drummond (died 1899), and James Arthur Lawrence Drummond (1905–1995). Their daughter Stella married the Conservative politician Lord Eustace Percy, who became Baron Percy of Newcastle.

== Retirement ==
In retirement Drummond lived at Sissinghurst Place, Cranbrook, Kent, and he was appointed a Justice of the Peace and Deputy Lieutenant for the county. He was a member of the Turf and Bath Clubs and maintained extensive gardens at Sissinghurst. F. A. Mercer's Gardens and Gardening 1936, published in New York City, deals with the art of ornamental gardens around the world and includes many photographs of those of Sir Philip Sassoon at Port Lympne and Trent Park and of Drummond at Sissinghurst Place.

Drummond died on 20 May 1946 at the age of 85. His funeral took place four days later at Sissinghurst parish church, when his coffin was carried by sergeants of the Scots Guards, the regiment's pipers played a lament, and the Last Post was sounded.
