= HMS Exmouth (1854) =

Ship of the line of the Royal Navy

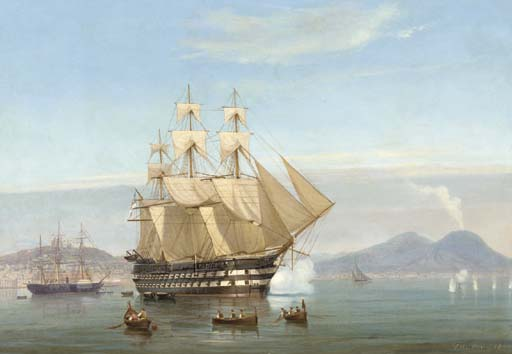
- Exmouth signalling her arrival at Naples

History

United Kingdom
- Name: Exmouth
- Ordered: 12 March 1840
- Builder: Devonport Dockyard
- Laid down: 13 September 1841
- Launched: 12 July 1854
- Completed: 15 March 1855
- Commissioned: 18 November 1854
- Out of service: Lent to Metropolitan Asylums Board as a training ship, 22 December 1876
- Fate: Sold for scrap, 4 April 1905

General characteristics (as a screw-propelled ship)
- Class & type: 91-gun, second rate Albion-class ship of the line
- Displacement: 4,382 long tons (4,452 t)
- Tons burthen: 3,083 57/94 (bm)
- Length: 204 ft (62.2 m) (gun deck)
- Beam: 60 ft 2 in (18.3 m)
- Draught: 24 ft 9 in (7.5 m)
- Depth of hold: 23 ft 8 in (7.2 m)
- Installed power: Boilers; 1,252 ihp (934 kW)
- Propulsion: 1 screw; single-expansion steam engine
- Sail plan: Full-rigged ship
- Speed: 9.1 knots (16.9 km/h; 10.5 mph)
- Complement: 830 officers and ratings
- Armament: 91 muzzle-loading, smoothbore guns; Lower gun deck: 32 × 8 in (203 mm) shell guns; Upper gun deck: 32 × 32 pdr guns; Forecastle & Quarterdeck: 26 × 32 pdr guns + 1 × 68 pdr gun

HMS Exmouth was a 91-gun, second-rate, Albion-class ship of the line built for the Royal Navy (RN) during the 1850s. The ship was converted to screw propulsion while still under construction. Completed in 1855, she served as a flagship in the Baltic Fleet during the Crimean War of 1854–1856 against the Russian Empire. The ship contributed boats and crewmen to the Bombardment of Sveaborg in August. Exmouth was paid off in 1857 and served as a guard ship. She was recommissioned in 1859 for service with the Mediterranean Fleet. The ship was paid off for the final time in 1862.

Exmouth was loaned to the Metropolitan Asylums Board to serve as a boys training ship in 1876. She was sold for scrap in 1905 and subsequently broken up.

== Background and description ==
Plan of Exmouth as a sailing ship

William Symonds, the Surveyor of the Navy, designed the Albion class in 1839 in response to a perceived shortage of British second-rate ships that were outnumbered by those of the French Navy. Symonds emphasized the ships' sailing qualities, rather than battle efficiency as they had a quick roll in poor weather that made them bad gun platforms. They were intended to measure 204 feet (62.2 m) at the gun deck and 165 feet 11 inches (50.6 m) at the keel. They would have had a beam of 60 feet (18.3 m), a depth of hold of 23 feet 8 inches (7.2 m) and had a tonnage of 3,083 12/94 tons burthen. Their crew would have numbered 820 officers and ratings in wartime. The ships had the usual three-masted full-ship rig. Their muzzle-loading, smoothbore armament was intended to consist of four 112 cwt, (Note: "Cwt" is the abbreviation for hundredweight, 112 cwt referring to the weight of the gun.) 68-pounder guns and twenty-eight 32-pounder (56 cwt) guns on the lower gun deck with six 8-inch (203 mm) 65 cwt, shell guns and twenty-six 56 cwt, 32-pounder guns on the upper gun deck. Between their forecastle and quarterdeck, they would have carried a pair of 8-inch (52 cwt) shell guns and twenty-four 32-pounder (42 cwt) guns.

Exmouth was ordered in 1840 as part of the second batch of Albions. The ship was laid down the following year, although a shortage of shipwrights caused construction of most of the Albions to be suspended in March 1842. Work resumed the following year, but was again suspended on 18 December 1844 as a result of Albion's poor performance during the recent cruise of the Experimental Squadron. Exmouth was believed to be too far along to be economically modified to fix Albion's faults, and work resumed on 28 February 1846.

== Screw conversion ==
Completion of the French fast steam-powered, second-rate Napoléon in early 1852 and the French preparations for building more like her caused an invasion scare that prompted the First Derby ministry to authorize a large programme of steam-powered ships of the line to maintain British naval superiority; thus initiating a naval arms race between France and Britain. Captain Baldwin Wake Walker, the new Surveyor of the Navy ordered Exmouth to be converted while she was still under construction on 30 October 1852; to cut costs, the ship was not lengthened to accommodate the propeller or the steam engine. The ship's measurements did not materially change from before. She had a draught of 24 feet 9 inches (7.5 m), displaced 4,382 long tons (4,452 t) and had a tonnage of 3,108 57/94 tons burthen. Her crew numbered 830 officers and ratings.

The ship was equipped with a two-cylinder, horizontal single-expansion steam engine built by Maudslay, Sons and Field that was rated at 400 nominal horsepower and drove a single propeller shaft. During Exmouth's sea trials on 21 April 1858, her boilers provided enough steam for the engine to produce 1,252 indicated horsepower (934 kW) that was good for a speed of 9.1 knots (16.9 km/h; 10.5 mph). The ships were fitted with three masts and were ship-rigged. To reduce drag and improve performance under sail, they could hoist their propellers into the hull and retract the telescoping funnel.

The Albion-class ships were armed with 91 guns that consisted of thirty-two 8-inch shell guns on their lower gun deck and thirty-two 56 cwt 32-pounder guns on their upper gun deck. Between the forecastle and quarterdeck, the ships carried twenty-six 32-pounder (42 cwt) guns. The single 68-pounder (95 cwt) gun was positioned on the forecastle as a pivot gun so that it could serve as a bow chaser.

== Construction and career ==
Named in honour of Admiral Edward Pellew, 1st Viscount Exmouth, Exmouth was the first ship of her name to serve in the RN. She was ordered on 12 March 1840 from Devonport Dockyard, where her keel was laid on 13 September 1841. After over a decade on the stocks, on 30 October 1852 she was ordered to be completed as a 91-gun two-decker with steam screw propulsion, and conversion began on 20 June 1853. On 12 July 1854 Exmouth was launched by the daughter of Admiral Stopford, Admiral-superintendent of the dockyard, in the presence of a crowd estimated at 2–3,000. She was commissioned by Captain Frederick Pelham on 18 November; he was relieved by Captain William King-Hall on 19 February 1855 and Exmouth was completed for service on 15 March.

She served as the flagship of Rear-Admiral Sir Michael Seymour, second-in-command of the Baltic Fleet. On 16 June, Seymour took a few ships to survey the mouth of the River Narva. During a reconnaissance of Kronstadt Fortress on 21 June, Seymour and King-Hall recovered a naval mine that had been deployed by the Russians. Taking it aboard Exmouth for further examination, Seymour triggered the mine, blinding himself in one eye and badly wounding several members of the ship's crew. The ship contributed boats and crews during the bombardment of Sveaborg in August.

Captain Harry Ayres relieved King-Hall on 20 March 1856. On 12 May 1857, Exmouth ran aground in Crewgreace Bay, west of The Lizard, Cornwall, but was refloated. Ayres was convicted of negligence by a court martial and was admonished. Her master, Edward Fancourt Cavell was also convicted. He was sentenced to be reprimanded and admonished. The ship was paid off on 20 June at Devonport. Captain Robert Spencer Robinson assumed command of the ship on 1 February 1858 which served as a guard ship at Devonport while still in ordinary. Captain James Stopford relieved Robinson in May 1859 and the ship was assigned to the Mediterranean Fleet. Stopford was relieved in his turn by Captain James Paynter on 1 May 1860. Exmouth returned home to be paid off on 14 October 1862.

=== Training ship ===
On 22 December 1876, the Admiralty lent Exmouth to the Metropolitan Asylums Board as a training ship, based at Grays, Essex, replacing the similar Goliath, which had been destroyed by fire in December 1875. These ships were recommended for boys supervised by the poor law authorities as an economic means of providing them with a career which also benefited the country.

Exmouth was sold by the Admiralty for scrap to George Cohen on 4 April 1905 and then broken up at Penarth, South Wales.

== Bibliography ==
- Clowes, William Laird (1901). The Royal Navy: A History from the Earliest Times to the Present. Vol. VI. Sampson Low, Marston.
- Colledge, J. J.; Warlow, Ben & Bush, Steve (2020). Ships of the Royal Navy: The Complete Record of all Fighting Ships of the Royal Navy from the 15th Century to the Present (5th revised and updated ed.). Seaforth Publishing. ISBN 978-1-5267-9327-0.
- Lambert, Andrew D. (1984). Battleships in Transition: The Creation of the Steam Battlefleet 1815-1860. Conway Maritime Press. ISBN 0-85177-315-X.
- Lambert, Andrew (2011) [1990]. The Crimean War: British Grand Strategy Against Russia, 1853–56 (Second ed.). Ashgate. ISBN 978-1-4094-1011-9.
- Lambert, Andrew D. (1991). The Last Sailing Battlefleet: Maintaining Naval Mastery 1815 - 1850. Conway Maritime Press. ISBN 0-85177-591-8.
- Manning, T. D. & Walker, C. F. (1959). British Warship Names. Putnam. OCLC 838607.
- Winfield, Rif (2014). British Warships in the Age of Sail 1817–1863: Design, Construction, Careers and Fates. Seaforth Publishing. ISBN 978-1-84832-169-4.
