= HMS Aboukir (1848) =

Ship of the line of the Royal Navy

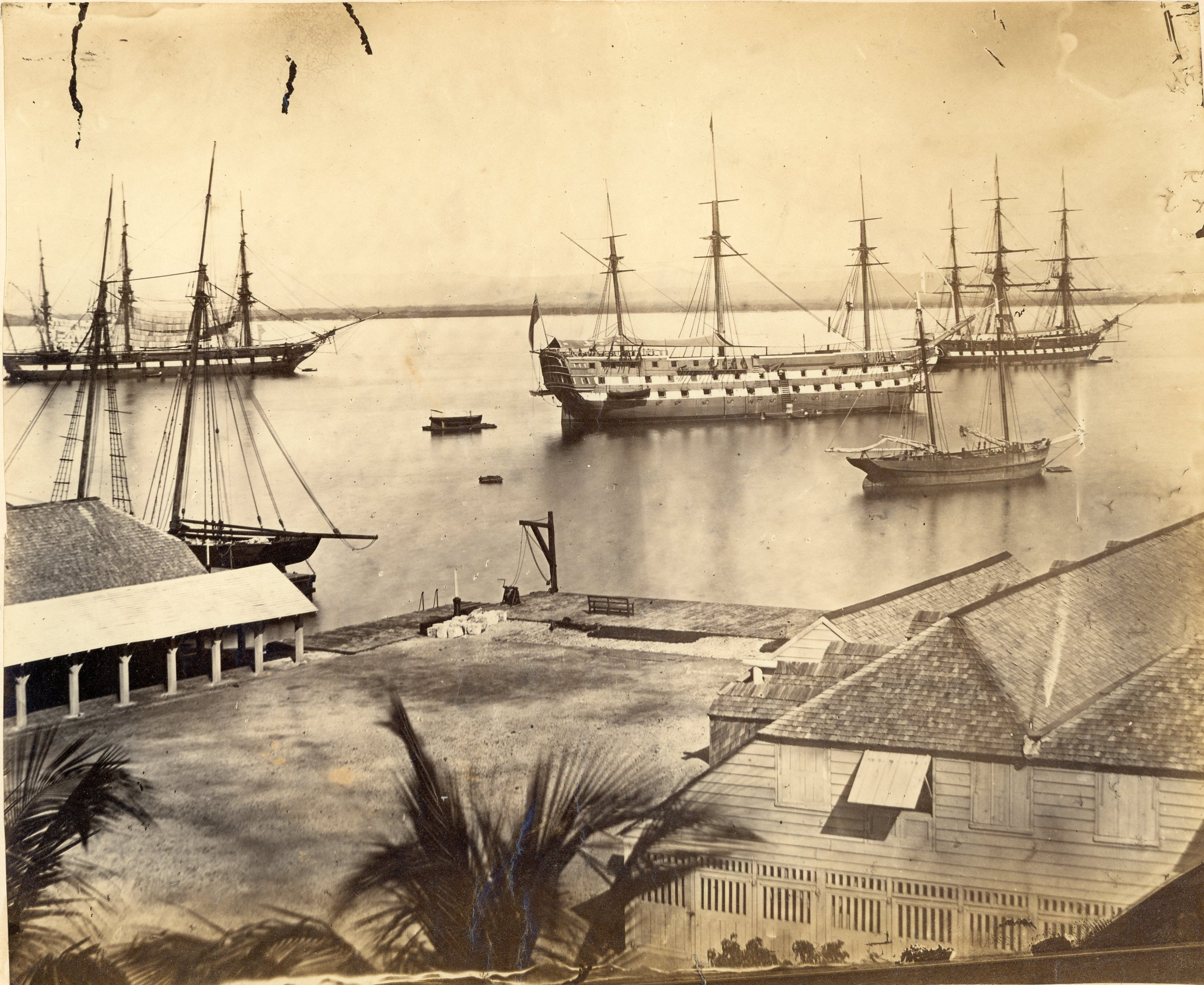
- Aboukir at Port Royal, Jamaica, c. 1865

History

United Kingdom
- Name: Aboukir
- Ordered: 18 March 1839
- Builder: Devonport Dockyard
- Laid down: August 1840
- Launched: 4 April 1848
- Completed: 1 January 1858
- Commissioned: 25 May 1859
- Reclassified: As Depot ship/Receiving ship/floating battery 19 September 1862
- Fate: Sold for scrap, 23 November 1877

General characteristics after conversion
- Class & type: 90-gun, second-rate, Albion-class ship of the line
- Displacement: 4,382 long tons (4,452 t)
- Tons burthen: 3,090 60/94 (bm)
- Length: 204 ft (62.2 m) (gun deck)
- Beam: 60 ft 1 in (18.3 m)
- Draught: 19 ft 2 in (5.8 m)
- Depth of hold: 23 ft 8 in (7.2 m)
- Installed power: Boilers; 1,533 ihp (1,143 kW)
- Propulsion: 1 screw; Trunk steam engine
- Sail plan: Full-rigged ship
- Speed: 9.6 knots (17.8 km/h; 11.0 mph)
- Complement: 830 officers and ratings
- Armament: 91 muzzle-loading, smoothbore guns; Lower gun deck: 32 × 8 in (203 mm) shell guns; Upper gun deck: 32 × 32 pdr guns; Forecastle & Quarterdeck: 26 × 32 pdr guns + 1 × 68 pdr gun

HMS Aboukir was a 90-gun, second-rate, Albion-class ship of the line built for the Royal Navy (RN) built during the 1840s. Completed in 1848, she was not outfitted for sea and was immediately placed in ordinary. The ship was converted to screw propulsion in 1856–1858. Aboukir was commissioned in 1859 and assigned to the Channel Squadron. Two years later she was briefly transferred to the Mediterranean Fleet and then to the North America and West Indies Station in 1862. The ship became the Depot ship/Receiving ship/floating battery in the Jamaica. Aboukir was sold for scrap in 1877.

== Background and description ==
Plan of Albion as a sailing ship

William Symonds, the Surveyor of the Navy, designed the Albion class in 1839 in response to a perceived shortage of British second-rate ships that were outnumbered by those of the French Navy. Symonds emphasized the ships' sailing qualities, rather than battle efficiency as they had a quick roll in poor weather that made them bad gun platforms. Aboukir measured 204 feet (62.2 m) at the gun deck and 165 feet 4 inches (50.4 m) at the keel. She had a beam of 60 feet 1 inch (18.3 m), a depth of hold of 23 feet 8 inches (7.2 m). The ship had a draught of 19 feet 2 inches (5.8 m) at light load and a tonnage of 3,090 60/94 tons burthen. Her crew numbered 820 officers and ratings in wartime. The ship had the usual three-masted full-ship rig.

Aboukir's muzzle-loading, smoothbore armament was intended to consist of four 112 cwt, (Note: "Cwt" is the abbreviation for hundredweight, 112 cwt referring to the weight of the gun.) 68-pounder guns and twenty-eight 32-pounder (56 cwt) guns on the lower gun deck with six 8-inch (203 mm) 65 cwt, shell guns and twenty-six 56 cwt, 32-pounder guns on the upper gun deck. Between their forecastle and quarterdeck, the ship would have carried a pair of 8-inch (52 cwt) shell guns and twenty-four 32-pounder (42 cwt) guns.

=== Screw conversion ===
Based on the experiences gained during the Crimean War, Captain Baldwin Wake Walker, Surveyor of the Navy, favored converting first- and second-rate ships as they could accommodate the engines and their required coal better than smaller ships. The arms race between France and Britain in screw-propelled ships of the line resumed after the war ended in 1856 and Walker ordered Aboukir to be converted in August of that year to match the anticipated numbers of French ships. The ship had a light draught of 20 feet 6 inches (6.2 m), a displacement of 4,382 long tons (4,452 t), and her crew increased to 830 officers and ratings. She was fitted with a 400-nominal horsepower, trunk steam engine built by John Penn and Sons. Her boilers produced enough steam that the two-cylinder, horizontal engine produced 1,553 indicated horsepower (1,158 kW) which gave the ship a speed of 9.6 knots (17.8 km/h; 11.0 mph) during her sea trials off Plymouth on 13 November 1858, albeit without masts or stores. To reduce drag and improve performance under sail, the ship could hoist her propeller into the hull and retract the telescoping funnel.

The Albion-class ships were armed with 91 guns that consisted of thirty-two 8-inch shell guns on their lower gun deck and thirty-two 56 cwt, 32-pounder guns on their upper gun deck. Between the forecastle and quarterdeck, the ships carried twenty-six 32-pounder (42 cwt) guns. The single 68-pounder (95 cwt) gun was positioned on the forecastle as a pivot gun so that it could serve as a bow chaser.

== Construction and career ==
Named after the bay in which the 1798 Battle of the Nile was fought, Aboukir was the third ship of her name to serve in the RN. She was ordered from HM Dockyard, Devonport, on 28 March 1839 and laid down in August 1840, although a shortage of shipwrights caused construction of most of the Albions to be suspended in March 1842. Work resumed the following year, but was again suspended on 18 December 1844 as a result of Albion's poor performance during the recent cruise of the Experimental Squadron. Aboukir was believed to be too far along to be economically modified to fix Albion's faults, and work resumed on 28 February 1846. The ship was launched on 4 April 1848 and completed on 19 April. She was not fitted out for sea and was immediately placed in ordinary.

Aboukir was ordered to be converted to screw propulsion on 20 August 1856 and work began on 8 October. The ship was undocked on 1 January 1858; Captain Charles Schomberg commissioned her on 25 May 1859 for service with the Channel Squadron. He was relieved by Captain Douglas Curry on 10 January 1860. On 6 July 1861, Aboukir ran aground on Yeusta Skerry. Repairs cost £302. Curry was relieved in his turn by Captain Charles Shadwell on 18 February 1862. The ship was briefly transferred to the Mediterranean Fleet and was then reassigned to the North America and West Indies Station in 1862. Aboukir became the receiving/depot ship and floating battery in Port Royal, Jamaica, on 19 September. She remained on that duty for the next 15 years. A monument on Southsea seafront commemorates an outbreak of Yellow Fever aboard her between 1873 and 1874. She was paid off on 20 July 1877 and sold for scrap on 23 November.

== Bibliography ==
- Colledge, J. J.; Warlow, Ben & Bush, Steve (2020). Ships of the Royal Navy: The Complete Record of all Fighting Ships of the Royal Navy from the 15th Century to the Present (5th revised and updated ed.). Seaforth Publishing. ISBN 978-1-5267-9327-0.
- Lambert, Andrew D. (1984). Battleships in Transition: The Creation of the Steam Battlefleet 1815-1860. Conway Maritime Press. ISBN 0-85177-315-X.
- Lambert, Andrew D. (1991). The Last Sailing Battlefleet: Maintaining Naval Mastery 1815 - 1850. Conway Maritime Press. ISBN 0-85177-591-8.
- Manning, T. D. & Walker, C. F. (1959). British Warship Names. Putnam. OCLC 838607.
- Winfield, Rif (2014). British Warships in the Age of Sail 1817–1863: Design, Construction, Careers and Fates. Seaforth Publishing. ISBN 978-1-84832-169-4.
