= List of ship launches in 1848 =

The list of ship launches in 1848 includes a non-exhaustive, chronological list of ships launched in 1848.

Date	Ship	Class	Builder	Location	Country	Notes
8 January	Cambria	Paddle steamer	John Laird	Birkenhead	United Kingdom	For Chester and Holyhead Railway.
8 January	Margaret	Schooner	Messrs. J. Dawson & Co.	Liverpool	United Kingdom	For private owner.
8 January	Trafalgar	Steamship	Messrs. Tod & McGregor	Partick	United Kingdom	For City of Dublin Steam Packet Company.
19 January	Andrew Foster	Packet ship		Williamsburgh, New York	United States	For private owner.
20 January	Montreal	Full-rigged ship	Messrs. Denny & Rankin	Dumbarton	United Kingdom	For Messrs. James & Alexander Allan.
21 January	Empress	Schooner	John Anderton	Runcorn	United Kingdom	For John Anderton, or Messrs. Giaive & partners.
21 January	Lyra	Steamship	Robert Napier and Sons	Govan	United Kingdom	For private owner.
January	Foyle	Steamship	Messrs. Caird & Co.	Greenock	United Kingdom	For private owner.
January	Pilot Fish	Full-rigged ship	A. Halls & Co.	Aberdeen	United Kingdom	For B. Darbyshire.
January	Saint Abbs	Barque	Austin & Mills	Sunderland	United Kingdom	For J. Willis.
3 February	Investigator	Barque	Messrs. John Scott & Sons	Greenock	United Kingdom	For British Government.
5 February	Nerbudda	Brig		Bombay	India	For Royal Navy.
7 February	Bull Float	Lightship	Messrs. Gibsons, Clifford, and Brown	Hull	United Kingdom	For Trinity House.
7 February	Vivid	Paddle sloop	Oliver W. Lang Jr.	Chatham Dockyard	United Kingdom	For Royal Navy.
9 February	Garland	Merchantman	James Laing	Sunderland	United Kingdom	For James Laing.
15 February	Tuscarora	Full-rigged ship	Vaughan & Lynn	Philadelphia, Pennsylvania	United States	For Messrs. Cope's Liverpool Line.
21 February	James Watt	Steamboat	Anderson	North Shields	United Kingdom	For private owner.
22 February	Brigand	Steamship	Messrs. Smith & Rodger	Govan	United Kingdom	For private owner.
February	Isabella Walker	Merchantman	builder	Sunderland	United Kingdom	For T. Walker.
February	Tertia	Snow	E. Brown	Sunderland	United Kingdom	For Potts & Co.
3 March	Kerslaw	Barque	Messrs. Barr & Shearer	Ardrossan	United Kingdom	For private owner.
7 March	Judy	Schooner	Messrs. Holman & Waters	Topsham	United Kingdom	For Messrs. Treatt & Bicknell.
7 March	Jumna	Helena-class brig		Bombay Dockyard	India	For Royal Navy.
7 March	Lady Montague	East Indiaman	Vaux	Northam	United Kingdom	For private owner.
8 March	Fair Trader	Steamship	Messrs. Smith & Rodger	Govan	United Kingdom	For Andrew Greig.
8 March	Leander	Fourth rate	Thomas Blake	Portsmouth Dockyard	United Kingdom	For Royal Navy.
13 March	Zéphyr	Zéphyr-class aviso		Bordeaux	France	For French Navy.
21 March	Reynard	Screw sloop		Deptford Dockyard	United Kingdom	For Royal Navy.
23 March	Canton	Steamship	Messrs. Tod and MacGregor	Partick	United Kingdom	For Peninsular and Oriental Steam Navigation Company.
28 March	Asia	Barque	Mr. Stephen	Dundee	United Kingdom	For private owner.
31 March	Mars	Steamship	Messrs. Denny Bros.	Dumbarton	United Kingdom	For Dundee, Leith and London Shipping Company.
31 March	Neptune	Steamship	Messrs. Denny Bros.	Dumbarton	United Kingdom	For Dundee, Leith and London Shipping Company.
March	Isabella Muston	Schooner	W. & J. Pile	Sunderland	United Kingdom	For Mr. Atkinson.
3 April	Sophia	Schooner	Messrs. Eyton & Co.	Mostyn	United Kingdom	For private owner.
4 April	Aboukir	Albion-class ship of the line		Devonport Dockyard	United Kingdom	for Royal Navy.
5 April	Arrogant	Frigate	Fincham	Portsmouth Dockyard	United Kingdom	For Royal Navy.
5 April	Commerce	Clipper	Messrs. Geddes & Young	Kingston on Spey	United Kingdom	For private owners.
5 April	Enterprise	Research vessel	Money Wigram & Sons	Blackwall	United Kingdom	For Royal Navy.
5 April	Plumper	Screw sloop	Fincham	Portsmouth Dockyard	United Kingdom	For Royal Navy.
6 April	Panic	Barque	Messrs. Cato & Miller	Liverpool	United Kingdom	For Thomas Ripley.
7 April	Celt	Steamship	Messrs. Denny Bros	Dumbarton	United Kingdom	For Campbeltown Company.
8 April	De Witt Clinton	Packet ship	Messrs. Perrine, Patterson & Stack	New York	United States	For Black Star Line.
12 April	Schah Jehan	Full-rigged ship	Messrs. Denny & Rankin	Dumbarton	United Kingdom	For Messrs. Henry Moore & Co.
14 April	Europa	Steamship		Glasgow	United Kingdom	For British and North American Royal Mail Steam Packet Company.
17 April	Charlotte Jane	Full-rigged ship	William Patterson	Bristol	United Kingdom	For private owner.
28 April	The Duke	Schooner	Messrs. Brindrit and Whiteway	Runcorn	United Kingdom	For private owner.
April	Amaranth	Merchantman	William Carr	Sunderland	United Kingdom	For Booth & Co.
April	Garrell	Schooner	William Napier Sr.	Glasgow	United Kingdom	For Forth & Clyde Canal Company.
April	Luggie	Schooner	William Napier Sr.	Glasgow	United Kingdom	For Forth & Clyde Canal Company.
April	Shirva	Schooner	William Napier Sr.	Glasgow	United Kingdom	For Forth & Clyde Canal Company.
3 May	Duguesclin	Suffren-class ship of the line	Antoine Auriol	Rochefort	France	For French Navy.
3 May	Ochtertyre	Barque	Messrs. Lunnan & Robertson	Peterhead	United Kingdom	For private owner.
4 May	Speculator	Schooner	Mason	Runcorn	United Kingdom	For private owner.
4 May	Victoria	Schooner	Mr. Duncan	Kingston on Spey	United Kingdom	For Messrs. Forbes, Milne & Co.
5 May	Colbert	Corvette		Cherbourg	France	For French Navy.
13 May	Harlequin	Steamship	Messrs. Smith & Son	Gainsborough	United Kingdom	For Gainsborough Steam Packet Company.
17 May	Inconstant	Fabert-class aviso		Nantes	France	For French Navy.
18 May	Ferooz	Frigate		Bombay	India	For British East India Company.
18 May	Mosquito	Yacht	Messrs. Ditchburn & Mare	Blackwall	United Kingdom	For private owner.
19 May	California	Paddle steamer	William H. Webb	New York	United States	For Pacific Mail Steamship Company.
20 May	Fabert	Fabert-class aviso		Nantes	France	For French Navy.
May	Amelia Gordon	Brig		Pictou	(United Kingdom of Great Britain and Ireland) Colony of Nova Scotia	For private owner.
May	Edward	Barque		Pictou	(United Kingdom of Great Britain and Ireland) Colony of Nova Scotia	For private owner.
May	Hardwicke	Merchantman	Ralph Hutchinson	Sunderland	United Kingdom	For Nicholson & Thorman.
1 June	Colossus	Vanguard-class ship of the line		Pembroke Dockyard	United Kingdom	For Royal Navy.
2 June	Canada	Steamship	Messrs. Robert Steel & Co.	Greenock	United Kingdom	For British and North American Royal Mail Steam Packet Company.
2 June	Hugh Roberts	Schooner	William Roberts	Nevin	United Kingdom	For private owner.
2 June	Jane	Schooner	William Roberts	Nevin	United Kingdom	For private owner.
2 June	The Gem	Schooner	Innes	Leith	United Kingdom	For private owner.
3 June	Bonigta	Clipper	Messrs. Hall & Sons	Footdee	United Kingdom	For William Killey.
3 June	Rusé	Rusé-class aviso	Jean Baudet	Paimbœuf	France	For French Navy.
3 June	Helen Wallace	East Indiaman	Joseph Steel	Liverpool	United Kingdom	For private owner.
20 June	Don Quixote	Schooner	J. Roberts	Pwllheli	United Kingdom	For W. Massey Williams.
29 June	Kelvin	Schooner	Messrs. Napier & Crichton	Glasgow	United Kingdom	For Forth & Clyde Canal Co.
30 June	Airdrie	Schooner	Messrs. Napier & Crichton	Glasgow	United Kingdom	For Forth & Clyde Canal Co.
June	Bonaparte	Schooner		Uddevalla	Sweden	For private owner
June	Lynx	Zéphyr-class aviso	Arnaud Chaigneau	Bordeaux	France	For French Navy.
June	Ottawa	Brig		Pictou	(United Kingdom of Great Britain and Ireland) Colony of Nova Scotia	For private owner.
1 July	Gannet	Steamship	Cork Steam Ship Company	Cork	United Kingdom	For Cork Steam Ship Company.
1 July	Jane	Brigantine		Bay of Fundy	(United Kingdom of Great Britain and Ireland) Colony of New Brunswick	For private owner.
1 July	Mars	Vanguard-class ship of the line		Chatham Dockyard	United Kingdom	For Royal Navy.
4 July	Mona	Yacht	Quine	Ramsey	Isle of Man	For William Drinkwater.
4 July	Trafalgar	East Indiaman	Messrs. R. & H. Green	Blackwall	United Kingdom	For Messrs. R. & H. Green.
17 July	Mariner	Snow	J. King	Sunderland	United Kingdom	For Mr. Thompson.
17 July	Waterford	Brig		River John	(United Kingdom of Great Britain and Ireland) Colony of Nova Scotia	For private owner.
29 July	Moselle	Corvette		Bordeaux	France	For French Navy.
31 July	Breslaw	Suffren-class ship of the line	Joseph Germain Chéri Fauveau	Brest, Finistère	France	For French Navy.
31 July	Chasseur	Brig		Lorient	France	For French Navy.
July	Arethusa	Schooner	William Jones	Caernarfon	United Kingdom	For private owner.
July	Blenheim	East Indiaman		Newcastle upon Tyne	United Kingdom	For Messrs. T. & W. Smith.
July	Gwen Jones	Schooner	Mr. Christian	Port Madoc	United Kingdom	For private owner.
July	Vengeance	Frigate		Lorient	France	For French Navy.
July	Margaret	Merchantman		South Shields	United Kingdom	For private owner.
July	Petilla	Brigantine	W. & J. Pile	Sunderland	United Kingdom	For Tarbit & Co.
1 August	Ariel	Steamship		Toulon	United Kingdom	For French Navy.
1 August	Serieuse	Corvette		Brest	France	For French Navy.
15 August	Balgownie	Barque	Messrs. Walter Hood & Co.	Aberdeen	United Kingdom	For private owner.
16 August	Railleur	Rusé-class aviso		Saint-Malo	France	For French Navy.
17 August	Ardencraig	Merchantman	Messrs. Cato, Miller & Co.	Liverpool	United Kingdom	For Messrs. Cannon, Miller & Co.
17 August	Robina Mitchell	Full-rigged ship	Messrs. Archibald McMillan & Son	Dumbarton	United Kingdom	For Thomas Mitchell.
22 August	Basilisk	Paddle sloop		Woolwich Dockyard	United Kingdom	For Royal Navy.
23 August	Naomi	Chinaman	Messrs. Cato, Miller & Co.	Liverpool	United Kingdom	For Messrs. Pryde, Jones & Co.
28 August	Jamestown	Merchantman	Ridgway	Dungarvan	United Kingdom	For Michael Mahoney.
30 August	Independence	Steamship	Messrs. White	Cowes	United Kingdom	Built for Peninsular and Oriental Steam Navigation Company, but sold to the Sicilian Government.
31 August	Albion	Steamship	C. Mare & Co.	Hull	United Kingdom	For General Steam Navigation Company.
31 August	Franklin	Steamship		New York	United States	For Ocean Navigation Steam Company.
31 August	Mercator	Steamship	Messrs. Thos. Wingate & Co.	Whiteinch	United Kingdom	For Hull & Leith Steam Packet Company.
31 August	Peruvian	Barque	Messrs. A. Hall & Sons	Aberdeen	United Kingdom	For private owner.
August	Ann	Schooner	J. Rodgerson	Sunderland	United Kingdom	For Mr. M'Callum.
August	Durham	Brigantine		Pictou	(United Kingdom of Great Britain and Ireland) Colony of Nova Scotia	For private owner
August	Industry	Schooner	Messrs. Lunnan & Robertson	Peterhead	United Kingdom	For private owner.
August	Ohio	steamship		New York	United States	For private owner.
1 September	Thistle	Steamship	Robert Napier and Sons	Govan	United Kingdom	For Glasgow and Londonderry Steam Packet Company.
3 September	Biche	Corvette		Dunkerque	France	For French Navy.
4 September	Ranee	Steamship		Singapore	Straits Settlements	For Royal Navy.
5 September	Diamond	Diamond-class corvette		Sheerness Dockyard	United Kingdom	For Royal Navy.
14 September	Henri IV	Hercule-class ship of the line	Paul Marie Leroux	Cherbourg	France	For French Navy.
15 September	Vermont	North Carolina-class ship of the line		Boston Navy Yard	United States	For United States Navy
16 September	Jægar	East Indiaman	Messrs. Clarke & Sons	Liverpool	United Kingdom	For Messrs. Clarke & Sons.
16 September	Unicorn	Steamship	Messrs. Brownlow, Pearson & Co.	Hull	United Kingdom	For Hull Steam Packet Co.
23 September	Express	Steamship	Messrs. Miller, Ravenhill & Co.	Blackwall	United Kingdom	For Edinburgh & Northern Railway Company.
26 September	Mary and Catherine	Pilot boat	Jacob Aaron Westervelt	New York	United States	For Josiah Johnson Sr.
29 September	Marquis of Stafford	Steamship	Messrs. John Reid & Co.	Port Glasgow	United Kingdom	For the Duke of Sutherland and Mr. Matheson.
September	Granville	Brig		"Granville," Bay of Fundy	(United Kingdom of Great Britain and Ireland) Unknown	For private owner
September	Henry Lawson	Barque	J. Mearns	Sunderland	United Kingdom	For Mr. Lawson.
September	John Wood	Full-rigged ship	Messrs. Wood & Sons	Marhport	United Kingdom	For private owner.
September	Madawska	Merchantman	Barclay, Curle & Co.	Glasgow	United Kingdom	For private owner.
September	Utility	Brigantine		Rustico	(United Kingdom of Great Britain and Ireland) Colony of Prince Edward Island	For private owner.
2 October	Bombay	Steamship	Messrs. Pilcher	Northfleet	United Kingdom	For Peninsular and Oriental Steam Navigation Company.
10 October	Orient	Barque	Walter Hood & Co.	Aberdeen	United Kingdom	For private owner.
12 October	Ariel	Barque	Messrs. Duthie	Aberdeen	United Kingdom	For private owner.
30 October	Sir Bevois	Full-rigged ship	Vaux	Northam	United Kingdom	For private owner.
October	Jessie	Barque			(United Kingdom of Great Britain and Ireland) Colony of New Brunswick	For private owner.
October	Johnnes Freiderick	Merchantman		Memel	Prussia	For H. D. Bradhering.
2 November	Vivid	Schooner	Messrs. Lunnan and Robertson	Peterhead	United Kingdom	For Peterhead and London Shipping Company.
11 November	Keystone State	Paddle steamer	Bidwell & Banta	Buffalo, New York	United Kingdom	For Charles M. Reed.
11 November	Meeanee	Vanguard-class ship of the line	Cursetjee Rostomjee	Bombay	India	For Royal Navy.
13 November	Taman	Steamship	Messrs. Robinsons & Russel	Poplar	United Kingdom	For Imperial Russian Government, or the Emperor of Russia.
14 November	Saranac	Sloop-of-war		Portsmouth Navy Yard	United States	For United States Navy.
15 November	The Black Prince	Schooner	William Jones	Caernarfon	United Kingdom	For Mr. Jones.
19 November	John Murray	Merchantman	Hylton Carr	Hylton	United Kingdom	For S. Murray.
21 November	Janus	Génie-class brig		Toulon	France	For French Navy.
25 November	Phaeton	Fourth rate		Deptford Dockyard	United Kingdom	For Royal Navy.
25 November	Reindeer	Merchantman	Hall & Sons	Footdee	United Kingdom	For private owner.
27 November	Findhorn	Brig	J. Duncan	Kingston on Spey	United Kingdom	For private owner.
28 November	The Scotia	Schooner	John Duncan	Kingston on Spey	United Kingdom	For Mr. Shand.
29 November	Emma and Eliza	Yorkshire Billyboy	William Atkinson	Goole	United Kingdom	For private owner.
November	James Heward	Merchantman	Margaret Reay	Sunderland	United Kingdom	For B. Heward.
November	Myra	Snow	T. Tiffin Jr. & B. Tiffin	Sunderland	United Kingdom	For Thomas & George Reed.
14 December	Cyclops	Schooner	John Moore	Castletown	Isle of Man	For Thomas Boyd.
27 December	Porvenir	Tug	Messrs. Cato, Miller & Co.	Liverpool	United Kingdom	For private owner.
28 December	Menai	Steamship	Messrs. Greenstreet and Paton	Liverpool	United Kingdom	For private owner.
December	Elizabeth	Sloop		Peterhead	United Kingdom	For private owner.
Unknown date	Activ	Man of war			Sweden	For Royal Swedish Navy.
Unknown date	Ann & Isabel	Merchantman		Sunderland	United Kingdom	For J. Robson.
Unknown date	Anne	Snow	W. Harty	Sunderland	United Kingdom	For Robert Willerton.
Unknown date	Balmoral	Schooner	R. Forrest & Co	Sunderland	United Kingdom	For R. Surtees.
Unknown date	Baltimore	Sidewheel steamer		Philadelphia, Pennsylvania	United States	For private owner.
Unknown date	Beatitude	Snow		Sunderland	United Kingdom	For Bird & Co.
Unknown date	Bermuda	Schooner		Bermuda	(United Kingdom of Great Britain and Ireland) Bermuda	For Royal Navy.
Unknown date	Bernicia	Schooner	R. Thompson	Sunderland	United Kingdom	For Hay & Co.
Unknown date	Bernicia	Barque	James Laing	Sunderland	United Kingdom	For Brodie & Co.
Unknown date	Black Friar	Barque		Sunderland	United Kingdom	For Mr. Greenwell.
Unknown date	Bounty of Providence	Yorkshire Billyboy	Edward Bannister	Lincoln	United Kingdom	For private owner.
Unknown date	Branch	Snow	Austin & Mills	Sunderland	United Kingdom	For John Gray & Co.
Unknown date	Brilliant	Snow	Byers	Sunderland	United Kingdom	For Mr. Matthew.
Unknown date	British Empire	Barque	G. W. & W. J. Hall	Sunderland	United Kingdom	For Hall & Co.
Unknown date	Caleb Grimshaw	Full-rigged ship	William H. Webb	New York	United States	For Caleb Grimshaw & Co.
Unknown date	Caledonia	Barque	R. H. Potts & Bros.	Sunderland	United Kingdom	For Potts Bros.
Unknown date	Calphurnia	Barque		Sunderland	United Kingdom	For Mr. Toulmin.
Unknown date	Candace	Merchantman	Sykes, Talbot & Sykes	Cox Green	United Kingdom	For Briggs & Co.
Unknown date	Caroline	Snow		Sunderland	United Kingdom	For W. Carling.
Unknown date	Charles	Brig		Pictou	(United Kingdom of Great Britain and Ireland) Colony of Nova Scotia	For private owner.
Unknown date	Charles Phelps	Whaler		New London, Connecticut	United States	For private owner.
Unknown date	Charlotte Whitmore	Barque	T. Stonehouse	Sunderland	United Kingdom	For Mr. Nicholson.
Unknown date	City of Glasgow	Full-rigged ship			United Kingdom	For private owner.
Unknown date	Constance	Barque	J. Watson	Sunderland	United Kingdom	For Mr. Marshall.
Unknown date	Cora	Paddle steamer	William Patterson	Bristol	United Kingdom	For Reichsflotte.
Unknown date	Crescent City	Schooner	Joshua T. Foster	Medford, Massachusetts	United States	For private owner.
Unknown date	Cresswell	Merchantman	Robert Thompson & Sons	Sunderland	United Kingdom	For Stephen Eltringham.
Unknown date	Culloden	full-rigged ship	H. Ferguson	Sunderland	United Kingdom	For Mr. Ferguson.
Unknown date	Dalhousie	Merchantman		Moulmein	Burma	For Mr. Allan.
Unknown date	Darien	Brig		Blyth	United Kingdom	For private owner.
Unknown date	Dorcas	Barque		Sunderland	United Kingdom	For J. Robson.
Unknown date	Duke	Schooner	Brundrit & Whiteway	Runcorn	United Kingdom	For Brundrit & Whiteway.
Unknown date	Economy	Merchantman		Sunderland	United Kingdom	For Mr. Chapman.
Unknown date	Edith	Snow		Sunderland	United Kingdom	For Mr. Bamfield.
Unknown date	Elijah Packer	Merchantman	James Laing	Sunderland	United Kingdom	For Mr. Packer.
Unknown date	Elizabeth	Snow		Sunderland	United Kingdom	For Mr. Hindmarsh.
Unknown date	Ellen	Schooner	Thomas Whymark	Sunderland	United Kingdom	For Thomas Whymark.
Unknown date	Engineer	Merchantman	J. Barkes	Sunderland	United Kingdom	For Mr. Kirtley.
Unknown date	Exchange	Schooner	R. Forrest & Co.	Sunderland	United Kingdom	For Mr. Hodgson.
Unknown date	Ellida	Corvette			Norway	For Royal Norwegian Navy.
Unknown date	Expert	Merchantman		Sunderland	United Kingdom	For Waite Bros.
Unknown date	Fairfax	Snow	William R. Abbay	Sunderland	United Kingdom	For William R. Abbay.
Unknown date	Fanny	Snow	L. Gales	Sunderland	United Kingdom	For Gales & Co.
Unknown date	Feyzâ-i Bahrî	Mecidiye-class frigate	Tersâne-i Âmire	Constantinople	Ottoman Empire	For Ottoman Navy
Unknown date	Firefly	Merchantman		Sunderland	United Kingdom	For private owner.
Unknown date	Friend	Pilot boat	Kelley & Holmes	East Boston, Massachusetts	United States	For Thomas Cooper.
Unknown date	Gallovidian	Schooner	J. Rodgerson	Sunderland	United Kingdom	For Rae & Co.
Unknown date	Gem	Snow		Sunderland	United Kingdom	For Mr. Schofield.
Unknown date	Général Castilla	Paddle steamer			France	For private owner.
Unknown date	Glide	Barque	William Doxford & W. Crown	Sunderland	United Kingdom	For Mr. Doxford.
Unknown date	Golden Grove	Snow		Sunderland	United Kingdom	For Mr. Brough.
Unknown date	Grey Hound	Clipper		Baltimore, Maryland	United States	For D. Stewart.
Unknown date	G. P. Griffith	Paddle steamer		Maumee, Ohio	United States	For private owner.
Unknown date	Henrietta	Barque	George Worthy	Sunderland	United Kingdom	For Ord & Co.
Unknown date	Henry Morton	Snow	Hugh Morton	Sunderland	United Kingdom	For J. Todd.
Unknown date	Hope	Snow		Sunderland	United Kingdom	For W. Herring.
Unknown date	Iceni	Merchantman	Robert Thompson & Sons	Sunderland	United Kingdom	For J.Hay.
Unknown date	Indiana	Steamship			United States	For private owner.
Unknown date	Isis	Barque	builder	Sunderland	United Kingdom	For "Shellsh'ar".
Unknown date	Jenny	Merchantman	W. & J. Pile	Sunderland	United Kingdom	For Mr. Haddock.
Unknown date	John Myers	schooner		Sunderland	United Kingdom	For Mr. Milner.
Unknown date	John Scott	Snow	R. Forrest & Co.	Sunderland	United Kingdom	For Heslop & Co..
Unknown date	John & Isabella	Snow	Robert Thompson & Sons	Sunderland	United Kingdom	For J. Curry.
Unknown date	Juan	Schooner	William Bonker	Salcombe	United Kingdom	For Robert Hurrell and others.
Unknown date	Kate	Schooner	Mr. Bevans	Llanelly	United Kingdom	For private owner.
Unknown date	Konstantin	Survey vessel	A. I. Butakov		Russia	For Imperial Russian Navy.
Unknown date	Lagerbjelke	Man of war			Sweden	For Royal Swedish Navy.
Unknown date	Lalla Rookh	Brig		Peterhead	United Kingdom	For private owner.
Unknown date	Lavinia	Merchantman	Robert Thomson & Sons	Sunderland	United Kingdom	For private owner.
Unknown date	Living Age	Clipper	Jotham Stetson	Medford, Massachusetts	United States	For Edward D. Peters & Co.
Unknown date	Lord George Bentinck	Barque		Sunderland	United Kingdom	For J. & F. Somes.
Unknown date	Lucy	Merchantman	Ralph Hutchinson	Sunderland	United Kingdom	For Harper & Co.
Unknown date	Margaret	Merchantman	T. Dryden	Sunderland	United Kingdom	For private owner.
Unknown date	Margaret	Schooner	D. A. Douglas	Sunderland	United Kingdom	For T. Brodie.
Unknown date	Margaret	Schooner	J. King	Sunderland	United Kingdom	For King & Co.
Unknown date	Mary Ann	Merchantman	William Harkass	Sunderland	United Kingdom	For private owner.
Unknown date	Mary Matthew	Merchantman	Peter Austin	Sunderland	United Kingdom	For George Matthew.
Unknown date	Memnon	Clipper	Smith and Dimon Shipyard	New York City	United States	For Merchants' Express Line.
Unknown date	Mercia	Snow	W. Petrie	Sunderland	United Kingdom	For J. Hay.
Unknown date	Meridian	Schooner		Ohio	United States	For private owner.
Unknown date	Merlin	Snow	R. H. Potts & Bros.	Sunderland	United Kingdom	For Potts & Co.
Unknown date	Minden	Full-rigged ship	James Laing	Sunderland	United Kingdom	For Duncan Dunbar & Co.
Unknown date	Mistley	Snow	Robert Thompson & Sons	Sunderland	United Kingdom	For Thomas Green.
Unknown date	Mora	Merchantman	T. Dryden	Sunderland	United Kingdom	For Mr. Simms.
Unknown date	Negotiator	Barque	J. Watson	Sunderland	United Kingdom	For Lonie & Co.
Unknown date	Orion	Barque		Sunderland	United Kingdom	For Mr. Henderson.
Unknown date	Phoenix	Steamship		Sunderland	United Kingdom	For private owner.
Unknown date	Phoenix	Snow		Sunderland	United Kingdom	For Mr. Patterson.
Unknown date	Pilot	Merchantman	Robert Thompson & Sons	Sunderland	United Kingdom	For George Potts.
Unknown date	Porto Novo	Full-rigged ship			Unknown	For private owner.
Unknown date	Prima Donna	Snow		Sunderland	United Kingdom	For Mr. Cropton.
Unknown date	Prince Albert	Snow		Sunderland	United Kingdom	For Clarke & Co.
Unknown date	Prince Charlie	Barque	J. Watson	Sunderland	United Kingdom	For R. Dall.
Unknown date	Radiant	Snow	Bowman and Drummond	Blyth	United Kingdom	For Richardson Bros.
Unknown date	Raduga	Medium clipper	Currier & Townsend	Newbury, Massachusetts	United States	For H. Prince and others.
Unknown date	Relief	Sloop	W. & T. Brodie	Sunderland	United Kingdom	For Brodie & Co.
Unknown date	Robert & Betsey	Brigantine		Sunderland	United Kingdom	For Benson & Co.
Unknown date	Roman Emperor	Full-rigged ship			United Kingdom	For private owner.
Unknown date	Roman Empress	Snow	Buchanan & Gibson	Sunderland	United Kingdom	For Lesslie & Co.
Unknown date	Rose	Merchantman	Lister & Bartram	Sunderland	United Kingdom	For T. Walker.
Unknown date	Royal Sovereign	Merchantman	G. W. & W. J. Hall	Sunderland	United Kingdom	For Mr. Collingwood.
Unknown date	Saint George	Snow	W. Wilkinson	Sunderland	United Kingdom	For Mr. Pinchim.
Unknown date	Sea Witch	Barque			United Kingdom	For Taylor & Co.
Unknown date	Secret	Merchantman		Sunderland	United Kingdom	For Mr. Kelso.
Unknown date	Senator	Paddle steamer	William H. Brown	New York	United States	For James C. Cunningham.
Unknown date	Senegal	Merchantman	Robert Thompson & Sons	Sunderland	United Kingdom	For Mr. Hay.
Unknown date	Serenader	Merchantman	J. Hardie & M. Clark	Sunderland	United Kingdom	For Turner Thompson.
Unknown date	St. Lawrence	Brandywine-class frigate		Norfolk Navy Yard	United States	For United States Navy.
Unknown date	Sumatra	Sixth rate		Rotterdam	Netherlands	For Royal Netherlands Navy.
Unknown date	Sumner	Barque	L. Gales	Sunderland	United Kingdom	For Brass & Co.
Unknown date	Swallow	Schooner	R. Wright	Sunderland	United Kingdom	For Wright & Co.
Unknown date	Syrian	Barque		Sunderland	United Kingdom	For Clay & Co.
Unknown date	Thomasine	Merchantman	William Byers	Sunderland	United Kingdom	For Parker & Co.
Unknown date	Trelawney	Barque			United Kingdom	For Messrs. Stirling, Gordon & Co.
Unknown date	Tryphena	Snow		Sunderland	United Kingdom	For Clay & Co.
Unknown date	Una	Snow	W. Hay	Sunderland	United Kingdom	For Waters & Co.
Unknown date	Uncle Sam	Paddle steamer		New Albany, Indiana	United States	For private owner.
Unknown date	United	Brig		Sunderland	United Kingdom	For Clarke & Co.
Unknown date	Wanderer	Merchantman	William Doxford & W. Crown	Sunderland	United Kingdom	For Parker & Co.
Unknown date	Waterloo	Full-rigged ship		Sunderland	United Kingdom	For Duncan Dunbar & Sons.
Unknown date	Wear	Merchantman	Robert Thompson & Sons	Sunderland	United Kingdom	For Thomas Weir.
Unknown date	William & John	Snow		Sunderland	United Kingdom	For Meadley & Co.
Unknown date	Witham	Merchantman	G. W. & W. J. Hall	Sunderland	United Kingdom	For private owner.
Unknown date	Yankee	Pilot boat	Holbrook & Adams	Boston, Massachusetts	United States	For New York Pilots.
