= List of shipwrecks in November 1849 =

The list of shipwrecks in November 1849 includes ships sunk, foundered, wrecked, grounded, or otherwise lost during November 1849.

== 1 November ==
List of shipwrecks: 1 November 1849
Ship	State	Description
Agnes and Anne	United Kingdom	The ship was wrecked off Anticosti Island, Province of Canada, British North America. Her crew were rescued. She was on a voyage from Quebec City, Province of Canada to the Clyde.
Enrico	Kingdom of Sardinia	The schooner foundered off Parsley Island, Morocco. Her crew were rescued. She was on a voyage from Gibraltar to Casablanca, Morocco.
Intrepid	United Kingdom	The ship ran aground and was damaged at Richibucto, New Brunswick, British North America. She floated off on 20 November and was towed into Richibucto.
Jane	United Kingdom	The ship was driven ashore and wrecked on Cumberland Island, Georgia, United States. She was on a voyage from Liverpool, Lancashire to Savannah, Georgia.
Oswy	United Kingdom	The ship was driven ashore near Lancing, Sussex.
Richard	Sweden	The ship sprang a leak and was run ashore at Rye, Sussex, United Kingdom. She was on a voyage from Alderney, Channel Islands to Newcastle upon Tyne, Northumberland, United Kingdom.
Standard	United Kingdom	The ship ran aground and was damaged at Richibucto. She was on a voyage from Pictou, Nova Scotia to Richibucto. She was refloated and taken into Richibucto.

== 2 November ==
List of shipwrecks: 2 November 1849
Ship	State	Description
Agnes and Ann	United Kingdom	The ship was wrecked 27 nautical miles (50 km) east of Anticosti Island, Province of Quebec, British North America. Her crew were rescued. She was on a voyage from Quebec City, Province of Canada to the Clyde.
Erin	United Kingdom	The ship was driven ashore at Drogheda, County Louth. She was on a voyage from Londonderry to Dublin. She was refloated and resumed her voyage.
Sailor Prince	United Kingdom	The ship was wrecked on a reef off "Cancum Island". All on board, more than 400 people, survived, but thirteen died in the next 24 hours. She was on a voyage from Liverpool, Lancashire to New Orleans, Louisiana.
St. Jacques et André	France	The ship was lost in the Gulf of Lyons. She was on a voyage from Algiers, Algeria to Marseille, Bouches-du-Rhône.

== 3 November ==
List of shipwrecks: 3 November 1849
Ship	State	Description
Andre	France	The ship was lost in the Gulf of Lyons.
Carl Gustav	Sweden	The ship was wrecked on a reef off Skagen, Denmark. Her crew were rescued. She was on a voyage from Leith, Lothian, United Kingdom to Gothenburg.
Europa	United Kingdom	The barque was wrecked near Cape St. George, Newfoundland, British North America. Her crew were rescued. She was on a voyage from Wallace, Nova Scotia, British North America to Liverpool, Lancashire.
Ianthe	United Kingdom	The ship was abandoned in the Atlantic Ocean. All on board were rescued by Canada (United Kingdom). Ianthe was on a voyage from Glasgow, Renfrewshire to Boston, Massachusetts, United States.
Quiely Shiel	United Kingdom	The ship was driven ashore at Gibraltar. She was on a voyage from London to Málaga, Spain. She was refloated on 6 November ad resumed her voyage.
South Carolina	United States	The ship ran aground on the Shag Rock, off the coast of Maine. She was on a voyage from Cádiz, Spain to Bath, Maine. She was refloated and taken into Bath in a leaky condition.
St. Jacques	France	The ship was lost in the Gulf of Lyons. She was on a voyage from Algiers, Algeria to Marseille, Bouches-du-Rhône.

== 4 November ==
List of shipwrecks: 4 November 1849
Ship	State	Description
Archaelus	United States	The full-rigged ship sprang a leak and foundered in the Bristol Channel off Lundy Island, Devon. She was on a voyage from Cardiff, Glamorgan to New York.
Belle Creole	United Kingdom	The ship ran aground in the Salween River and was severely damaged. She was on a voyage from Glasgow, Renfrewshire to Moulmein, Burma. She was refloated and taken into Moulmein.
Britannia	United Kingdom	The steamship ran aground at South Shields, County Durham. She was on a voyage from Leith, Lothian to South Shields.
Catherine	(United Kingdom of Great Britain and Ireland) Isle of Man	The ship sank in the River Shannon during a squall. Her crew were rescued. She was on a voyage from Limerick to Liverpool, Lancashire.
Charlotte	United Kingdom	The ship was driven ashore on Mutton Island, County Galway. She was refloated on 15 November and found to be hogged.
Friendship	(United Kingdom of Great Britain and Ireland) British North America	The schooner sprang a leak and was beached on Rose Island, Rhode Island, United States. She was on a voyage from Jamaica to Boston, Massachusetts, United States.
General de Scalon	Austrian Empire	The barque collided with Andes (United Kingdom) and sank in the Atlantic Ocean off Cape Clear Island, County Galway, United Kingdom. Her crew were rescued by Andes. General de Scalon was on a voyage from Sligo, United Kingdom to Trieste.
Lydia	United Kingdom	The schooner struck a sunken rock and foundered off St. Davids, Pembrokeshire. Her crew were rescued. She was on a voyage from Liverpool to Rotterdam, South Holland, Netherlands.
Oak	United Kingdom	The brig was abandoned in the Atlantic Ocean. Her crew were rescued; one of them by Homely (United Kingdom), the rest by Xarifa (Brazil). Oak was on a voyage from Adelaide, South Australia to Swansea, Glamorgan.
Welvaart	Netherlands	The ship was driven ashore. She was on a voyage from Amsterdam, North Holland to Bremen. She was refloated and put into "Ecumazl" in a leaky condition.

== 5 November ==
List of shipwrecks: 5 November 1849
Ship	State	Description
Charlotte	(United Kingdom of Great Britain and Ireland) British North America	The ship was driven ashore on Mutton Island, County Galway. She was on a voyage from Queenstown, County Cork to Galway.
Eliza and Hester	United Kingdom	The ship ran aground off the Tuskar Rock and was damaged. She was on a voyage from Liverpool, Lancashire to Bombay, India. She was refloated and put back to Liverpool in a leaky condition.
Harmony	United Kingdom	The ship was driven ashore at the Point of Cara, Orkney Islands.
Ocean	United Kingdom	The schooner was driven ashore and severely damaged at Mawgan Porth, Cornwall. She was on a voyage from Cork to Portsmouth, Hampshire.
South Stockton	United Kingdom	The brig was abandoned in the Atlantic Ocean (54°00′N 20°28′W). Her two surviving crew were rescued by Helen Thompson (United Kingdom), three other having died since 11 October when the vessel capsized. South Stockton was on a voyage from Quebec City, Province of Canada, British North America to Newcastle upon Tyne, Northumberland.

== 6 November ==
List of shipwrecks: 6 November 1849
Ship	State	Description
George	United Kingdom	The smack foundered off Ardrossan, Ayrshire with the loss of all six people on board. She was on a voyage from Troon to Lochgilphead, Argyllshire.
James	United Kingdom	The ship struck the pier, was driven ashore and severely damaged at Whitehaven, Cumberland. She was on a voyage from Killough, County Down to Whitehaven. She was refloated on 9 November.
John Wesley	United Kingdom	The ship was driven ashore on Saltholm, Denmark. She was on a voyage from Danzig to London. She was refloated on 9 November and resumed her voyage.
Renfrewshire	United Kingdom	The ship ran aground in the River Avon. She was on a voyage from Quebec City, Province of Canada, British North America to Bristol, Gloucestershire. She was refloated and taken into Bristol.
Reverend Theobald Mathew	United Kingdom	The ship was driven ashore and damaged on Salt Island, Anglesey. She was refloated the next day.
Saturne	France	The ship ran aground on the Scroby Sands, Norfolk, United Kingdom. She was on a voyage from Hartlepool, County Durham, United Kingdom to Marseille, Bouches-du-Rhône. She was refloated the next day and taken into Great Yarmouth, Norfolk.
Theobold Matthew	United Kingdom	The ship was driven ashore and damaged on Salt Island, Anglesey. She was refloated the next day and taken into Holyhead, Anglesey.

== 7 November ==
List of shipwrecks: 7 November 1849
Ship	State	Description
Alfred	United Kingdom	The ship was driven ashore at Margate, Kent. She was on a voyage from London to Dunkirk, Nord. She was refloated.
Arpenteur	(United Kingdom of Great Britain and Ireland) South Australia	The brig was driven ashore and wrecked in Cheyne Bay, Swan River Colony. Her crew survived. She was on a voyage from the Swan River Colony to Adelaide.
Auguste	Stettin	The ship was driven ashore at Kronstadt, Russia. She was on a voyage from Kronstadt to Stettin. She was refloated on 13 November and taken into Kronstadt for repairs.
Constance	France	The schooner ran aground and sank in the River Tywi. Her crew were rescued. A steamship then collided with her and wrecked her.
Drie Kinderen	Netherlands	The ship was driven ashore in the Waddenzee. Her crew were rescued. She was on a voyage from Termunten, Groningen to Newcastle upon Tyne, Northumberland, United Kingdom.
Mary Morris	United Kingdom	The ship ran aground in the Clyde at Wemyss point. She was on a voyage from Glasgow, Renfrewshire to New York. She was refloated the next day and towed into Greenock, Renfrewshire.
Saturne	France	The ship ran aground on Scroby Sands, Norfolk, United Kingdom. She was on a voyage from Newcastle upon Tyne, Northumberland, United Kingdom to Marseille, Bouches-du-Rhône.
Thomasine	United Kingdom	The barque ran aground off Dunkirk, Nord, France. she was on a voyage from Sunderland, County Durham to Point-de-Galle, Ceylon. She was refloated and taken into Vlissingen, Zeeland, Netherlands.

== 8 November ==
List of shipwrecks: 8 November 1849
Ship	State	Description
Boerheve	Netherlands	The barque was driven ashore in the Nord Waal. She was on a voyage from Rotterdam, South Holland to Liverpool, Lancashire, United Kingdom. She was refloated.
Defiance	United Kingdom	The ship was driven ashore in Runswick Bay.
Hope	United Kingdom	The barque ran aground in the River Wyre. She was on a voyage from America to Fleetwood, Lancashire.
Melissa	United Kingdom	The brig was in collision with the brig Edward (United Kingdom) and sank in the North Sea off the coast of Yorkshire. Her crew took to the boats and were subsequently rescued by the brig Etherley (United Kingdom). Melissa was on a voyage from South Shields, County Durham to Barking, Essex.
Prince of Wales	United Kingdom	The ship ran aground on the Herd Sand, in the North Sea off the coast of County Durham. She was on a voyage from London to South Shields. She was refloated the next day and taken into South Shields.
Providence	United Kingdom	The ship was driven ashore in Runswick Bay.
Reine Nascapie	(United Kingdom of Great Britain and Ireland) British North America	The schooner was wrecked. Her crew were rescued. She was on a voyage from Saint John, New Brunswick to Halifax, Nova Scotia.
Rival	United Kingdom	The schooner was driven ashore on Scharhörn and was abandoned by her crew, who were subsequently rescued by Countess of Lonsdale (United Kingdom).
Thomasine	United Kingdom	The ship ran aground off Dunkerque, Nord. She was on a voyage from Sunderland, County Durham to Ceylon. She was refloated and towed into Vlissingen, Zeeland, Netherlands.

== 9 November ==
List of shipwrecks: 9 November 1849
Ship	State	Description
Bess	United States	The full-rigged ship sank off Lundy Island, Devon, United Kingdom. Her crew had abandoned her the previous day.
Earl Grey	United Kingdom	The ship ran aground on the Long Sand, in the North Sea off the coast of Essex. She was on a voyage from Great Yarmouth, Norfolk to Liverpool, Lancashire. She was refloated and put back to Great Yarmouth in a leaky condition.
Elizabeth	United Kingdom	The ship ran aground and sank off Ameland, Friesland, Netherlands. Her crew were rescued. She was on a voyage from Newcastle upon Tyne, Northumberland to Amsterdam, North Holland, Netherlands.
Francis	Prussia	The ship departed from "Noenstock", Norway for Boston, Massachusetts, United States. No further trace, presumed foundered with the loss of all hands.
Hanover	United States	The East Indiaman was driven ashore and wrecked on Pond Island, Maine with the loss of 26 of her 27 crew. She was on a voyage from Trieste to Trapani, Sicily and Bath, Maine.
Hendrikus	Bremen	The ship was wrecked near Baltrum, Kingdom of Hanover. Her crew were rescued. She was on a voyage from Newcastle upon Tyne, Northumberland to the Weser.
Joseph Ham	(United Kingdom of Great Britain and Ireland) British North America	The brig was wrecked in the Cranberry Isles, Maine, United States. She was on a voyage from Windsor, Nova Scotia to Portland, Maine.
Lady Collins	United Kingdom	The schooner was driven ashore and wrecked at Terceira, Spain.
Louise	United Kingdom	The ship was driven ashore on Scharhörn. She was refloated and taken into Cuxhaven.
Maria Amalia	Kingdom of Hanover	The ship ran aground off Norderney and was severely damaged. She was on a voyage from Hull, Yorkshire. United Kingdom to Leer. She was refloated on 12 November.

== 10 November ==
List of shipwrecks: 10 November 1849
Ship	State	Description
Ayrshire	United Kingdom	The ship was driven ashore on Green Island, County Louth. She was on a voyage from Quebec City, Province of Canada, British North America to an Irish port. She was refloated and taken into Warrenpoint, County Down.
Belohnung	Danzig	The ship was driven ashore and wrecked on Bornholm, Denmark. Her crew were rescued. She was on a voyage from Liverpool, Lancashire, United Kingdom to Danzig.

== 11 November ==
List of shipwrecks: 11 November 1849
Ship	State	Description
Bezaleel	United Kingdom	The ship ran aground off Argostoli, Greece. She was on a voyage from "Lizury" to Liverpool, Lancashire. She was refloated, resuming her voyage from 15 November.
British Oak	United Kingdom	The ship was wrecked in the Cymryan Strait. She was on a voyage from New York, United States to Liverpool, Lancashire.
Comet	Netherlands	The ship ran aground on the Scroby Sands, Norfolk, United Kingdom. She was on a voyage from Amsterdam, North Holland to Valparaíso, Chile. She was refloated and taken into Great Yarmouth, Norfolk.
Employ	United Kingdom	The ship was driven ashore on the coast of Öland, Sweden. She was on a voyage from Saint Petersburg, Russia to London. She had been refloated by 20 November and resumed her voyage.

== 12 November ==
List of shipwrecks: 12 November 1849
Ship	State	Description
Ann	United Kingdom	The schooner was wrecked on Düne, Heligoland. Her crew were rescued. She was on a voyage from Stockton-on-Tees, County Durham to Hamburg.
Isis	Prussia	The ship ran aground and sank off Anholt, Denmark. Her crew were rescued. She was on a voyage from St. Ubes, Portugal to klaipėda.
Rose	United Kingdom	The ship foundered off Passagan Point, India. Her crew were rescued by Futteh Salaam ( India). Rose was on a voyage from Calcutta, India to Île Bourbon.
Sailor Prince	United Kingdom	The ship was wrecked on a reef off "Caucun Island". All on board were rescued. She was on a voyage from Liverpool, Lancashire to New Orleans, Louisiana, United States.

== 13 November ==
List of shipwrecks: 13 November 1849
Ship	State	Description
Amanda	Sweden	The ship was wrecked off Westergarn, Gotland. She was on a voyage from "Karko" to Marseille, Bouches-du-Rhône, France.
Gazelle	Kingdom of Hanover	The galiot caught fire and was beached near Shanklin, Isle of Wight, United Kingdom, where she was burnt out. She was on a voyage from Wilmington, North Carolina, United States to Bremen.
Millart	United Kingdom	The ship struck a sunken rock off the Isle of Mull, Inner Hebrides and was damaged. She was on a voyage from Liverpool, Lancashire to Banff, Aberdeenshire. She put into Oban, Argyllshire in a waterlogged condition the next day.
Pathfinder	United Kingdom	The ship ran aground on a reef between Maldonado, Uruguay and Pan de Acúzar, Uruguay and sank.
Salus	United Kingdom	The ship ran aground on the Westertill, in the North Sea and sank. Her crew were rescued. She was on a voyage from Hamburg to Hull, Yorkshire.

== 14 November ==
List of shipwrecks: 14 November 1849
Ship	State	Description
Cordelia	United Kingdom	The ship caught fire and was scuttled at Liverpool, Lancashire. She was on a voyage from Liverpool to Calcutta, India. She was refloated the next day.
Mary	United Kingdom	The ship ran aground north west of Læsø, Denmark. She was on a voyage from the Ise Fjord to London. She was refloated and put into Marstrand, Sweden, where she arrived on 20 November.
Mathilda	Netherlands	The ship ran aground on the Arneminders Sands. Her crew were rescued. She was on a voyage from Singapore to Amsterdam, North Holland.

== 15 November ==
List of shipwrecks: November 1849
Ship	State	Description
Almuth Catharina	(flag) Prussia	The ship departed from Pillau for London, United Kingdom. No further trace, preumed foundered with the loss of all hands.
Ant	United Kingdom	The schooner was wrecked on the Craigdhu Rock, off Cemaes, Anglesey. Her crew were either rescued, or drowned, but the ship's Newfoundland dog survived.
Commerce	United Kingdom	The ship was driven ashore and wrecked at "Port Scadem". Her crew were rescued.
Ganges	United Kingdom	The ship was driven ashore and severely damaged in Derbyhaven Bay, Isle of Man. She was on a voyage from Quebec City, Province of Canada, British North America to Warrenpoint, County Antrim.
Lady Sale	United Kingdom	The ship was driven ashore and wrecked at Calingapatnam, India. Her crew were rescued. She was on a voyage from Liverpool, Lancashire to Madras, India.
Louisiana	United States	The steamboat was destroyed by a boiler explosion at Saint Louis, Missouri with the loss of between 50 and 200 lives. Two other steamboats were severely damaged.
Neptunus	(Russian Empire) Grand Duchy of Finland	The ship was wrecked near Grisslehamn. She was on a voyage from Rostock to Pori.
Star	United Kingdom	The brig was wrecked on the north west coast of Guernsey, Channel Islands with the loss of twelve of her fourteen crew.
Utility	United Kingdom	The ship ran aground on the Long Sand, in the North Sea off the coast of Essex. She was on a voyage from South Shields, County Durham to Abbeville Somme, France. She was refloated.
Victor	United Kingdom	The ship ran aground off Helsingør, Denmark. She was on a voyage from Saint Petersburg, Russia to London. She was refloated the next day and taken into Helsingør in a leaky condition.

== 16 November ==
List of shipwrecks: 16 November 1849
Ship	State	Description
Alert	United Kingdom	The ship ran aground on the Haisborough Sands, in the North Sea off the coast of Norfolk. She was refloated the next day and taken into Lowestoft, Suffolk.
Charles Phillips	United Kingdom	The ship was wrecked near Watchet, Somerset. She was on a voyage from Gloucester to Watchet.
Deborah	United Kingdom	The ship was lost off the mouth of the Eider. Her crew were rescued. She was on a voyage from Liverpool, Lancashire to Kiel, Prussia.
Economy	United Kingdom	The ship was driven ashore at Whitstable, Kent. She was on a voyage from Sunderland, County Durham to Whitstable.
Eliza	United Kingdom	The ship was in collision with the steamship Leeds (United Kingdom) and was beached at Clontarf, County Dublin. She was refloated.
Erik Borresen	Norway	The brig was wrecked on Texel, North Holland, Netherlands with the loss of all ten crew. She was on a voyage from Dram to a Cornish port.
L'Europe	France	The barque was wrecked on Guernsey, Channel Islands with the loss of all three passengers and all but one of her eleven crew. She was on a voyage from "Xagua la Grande", Cuba to Havre de Grâce, Seine-Inférieure.
Margaret	United Kingdom	The ship was abandoned in the North Sea 120 nautical miles (220 km) north west of Flamborough Head, Yorkshire. Her crew were rescued by Choice (United Kingdom). Margearet was on a voyage from Uddevalla, Sweden to London.
Pioneer	United Kingdom	The ship ran aground on the Haisborough Sands and sank. Her crew survived. She was on a voyage from Liebau, Prussia to London.
Sally	United Kingdom	The brig ran aground on the Haisborough Sands.
Tuscarora	United States	The ship was driven ashore and wrecked 5 nautical miles (9.3 km) south of Cape Henlopen, Delaware, United States. All on board, at least 450 and possibly in excess of 600 people, were rescued. She was on a voyage from Liverpool to Philadelphia, Pennsylvania.
Two Sisters	United Kingdom	The sloop was driven ashore and wrecked east of Wells-next-the-Sea, Norfolk with the loss of all hands.
Victor	United Kingdom	The ship ran aground off Helsingør, Denmark. She was on a voyage from Saint Petersburg, Russia to London. She was refloated and taken into Helsingør.

== 17 November ==
List of shipwrecks: 17 November 1849
Ship	State	Description
Aboukir	India	The ship was struck a rock and was damaged at Bombay, where she was beached. She was on a voyage from London to Bombay. She was refloated on 30 November and taken into Bombay for repairs.
Agnes	United Kingdom	The ship ran aground off Waterford. She was on a voyage from the Clyde to Tralee, County Cork. She was refloated the next day.
Greyhound	United Kingdom	The full-rigged ship was wrecked on the Grassholm Rocks, in the Baltic Sea with the loss of all hands. She was on a voyage from Pillau, Prussia to Grangemouth, Stirlingshire.
Harmony	United Kingdom	The sloop was driven ashore at Inaclit Point, Isle of Lewis, Outer Hebrides. She was on a voyage from Drogheda, County Louth to Wick, Caithness. She was refloated on 20 November and taken into Stornoway, Isle of Lewis.
Irene	United Kingdom	The brig collided with Robert (United Kingdom) and was abandoned in the Atlantic Ocean. Her crew were rescued by Robert. Irene was on a voyage from New York City, United States to Liverpool, Lancashire.
Johanna Frederica	Stralsund	The ship was wrecked near Cammin, Rostock. She was on a voyage from Danzig to Stralsund.
Liverpool Packet	United Kingdom	The ship was holed by an anchor and sank in the River Avon. She was on a voyage from Bristol, Gloucestershire to Neath, Glamorgan.
Marchioness of Abercorn	United Kingdom	The ship was driven ashore and wrecked at Mizen Head, County Cork. She was on a voyage from Quebec City, Province of Canada, British North America to Cardiff, Glamorgan.
Maria Margretha	Kingdom of Hanover	The ship ran aground on the Westplaat, in the North Sea. She was on a voyage from Carolinensiel to London, United Kingdom.
Margaret	United Kingdom	The brig ran aground in Saint Tudwal's Islands, Pembrokeshire. She was on a voyage from Liverpool to Porto, Portugal. She put into Pwllheli, Caernarfonshire the next day in a leaky condition.
Olive Branch	United Kingdom	The ship ran aground on the Sizewell Bank, in the North Sea off the coast of Suffolk and sank. Her crew were rescued by the schooner Sylvanus (United Kingdom). She was on a voyage from Seaham, County Durham to London.
Quebec Packet	United Kingdom	The ship ran aground on the Gunfleet Sand, in the North Sea off the coast of Essex. She was on a voyage from Arkhangelsk, Russia to London. She was refloated.

== 18 November ==
List of shipwrecks: 18 November 1849
Ship	State	Description
Isabella and Margaret	United Kingdom	The ship ran aground and sank in the Farne Islands, Northumberland. Her crew were rescued. She was on a voyage from Newcastle upon Tyne, Northumberland to Dundee, Forfarshire.
Istock	Trieste	The ship sank at Cardiff, Glamorgan, United Kingdom. She was consequently condemned.
John Troughton	United Kingdom	The ship was driven ashore and wrecked on the coast of Gotland, Sweden. Her crew were rescued by means of Carte's lifebuoys. She was on a voyage from Vyborg, Grand Duchy of Finland to London.

== 19 November ==
List of shipwrecks: 19 November 1849
Ship	State	Description
Coquette	United Kingdom	The ship was sighted in the Øresund whilst on a voyage from Griefswald to an English port. No further trace, presumed foundered with the loss of all hands.
Royal Archer	United Kingdom	The barque was in collision with the barque Benares (United Kingdom) and sank in the Atlantic Ocean (6°07′00″N 19°42′30″W). She was on a voyage from London to Port Adelaide, South Australia.

== 20 November ==
List of shipwrecks: 20 November 1849
Ship	State	Description
Andrew White	United Kingdom	The brig was driven ashore and wrecked at Milltown Malbay, County Cork.
Annabella	United Kingdom	The ship ran aground at Stornoway, Isle of Lewis, Outer Hebrides. She was on a voyage from Newcastle upon Tyne, Northumberland to Dublin. She was refloated and resumed her voyage.
Caleb Grimshaw	United States	The ship was destroyed by fire in the Atlantic Ocean 16 nautical miles (30 km) southeast of Faial Island, Azores with the loss of 101 of the 457 people on board. Some of the survivors were rescued by the barque Sarah (United Kingdom), others reached land in their boats. She was on a voyage from Liverpool, Lancashire, United Kingdom to an American port.
Charlotte	(United Kingdom of Great Britain and Ireland) British North America	The ship was driven ashore on Hogg Island, Prince Edward Island. She was on a voyage from Peter's Bay to Georgetown.
Flowers	United Kingdom	The ship was driven ashore at the entrance to the Drogden. She was on a voyage from Saint Petersburg, Russia to London.
Janet Kelso	United Kingdom	The sloop was wrecked on a reef off Kildonan, Arran. Her crew were rescued. She was on a voyage from Larne, County Antrim to the Clyde.
Jet	United Kingdom	The ship was driven ashore and wrecked at the entrance to the Drogden. She was on a voyage from Saint Petersburg to an English port.
Jongen Antonius	Belgium	The ship ran aground and sank on the Noorder Rassenthe, in the North Sea and sank. Her crew were rescued. She was on a voyage from Antwerp to London, United Kingdom.

== 21 November ==
List of shipwrecks: 21 November 1849
Ship	State	Description
Caroline	(United Kingdom of Great Britain and Ireland) British North America	The barque was in collision with Commerce (United Kingdom) and was abandoned in the Bristol Channel 8 nautical miles (15 km) west of Lundy Island, Devon. Her crew were rescued by Commerce. Caroline was on a voyage from Newport, Monmouthshire to Bermuda. She came ashore and was wrecked on the coast of Pembrokeshire on 23 November.
Elizabeth	United Kingdom	The ship was driven ashore at Ferryland Head, Newfoundland, British North America. Her crew were rescued. She was on a voyage from Hamburg to Torquay, Devon and Saint John's, Newfoundland.
St. Lawrence	(United Kingdom of Great Britain and Ireland) British North America	The schooner was wrecked on Miscou Island, New Brunswick. Her crew were rescued. She was on a voyage from Quebec City, Province of Canada to Saint John, New Brunswick.

== 22 November ==
List of shipwrecks: 23 November 1849
Ship	State	Description
Industry	United Kingdom	The schooner was driven ashore at Great Yarmouth, Norfolk. She was refloated on 23 November and taken into Great Yarmouth.

== 23 November ==
List of shipwrecks: 23 November 1849
Ship	State	Description
Charles	United Kingdom	The ship foundered during a squall in the Bristol Channel off Peterstone, Glamorgan with the loss of her captain. She was on a voyage from Cardiff, Glamorgan to Newport, Monmouthshire.
Don	United Kingdom	The ship ran aground at South Shields, County Durham. She was refloated.
Dudley Seden	United States	The barque foundered in the Atlantic Ocean off Cape Sacratif, Spain. Her crew were rescued by Marmora (Ottoman Empire). Dudley Seden was on a voyage from Roquetas de Mar, Spain to New York.
Emma	United Kingdom	The ship was driven ashore at Redcar, Yorkshire. She was on a voyage from Southampton, Hampshire to Sunderland, County Durham.
Emily	United Kingdom	The ship was driven ashore between Grado, Kingdom of Lombardy–Venetia and the mouth of the Sdobba. She was on a voyage from Pula, Austrian Empire to Trieste.
Fortunée	France	The ship capsized at Newport. She was on a voyage from Granville, Manche to Newport. She was righted on 25 November and found to be severely damaged.
Habnab	United Kingdom	The ship was driven ashore at Étaples, Pas-de-Calais, France. Her crew were rescued. She was on a voyage from Jersey, Channel Islands to Hartlepool, County Durham.
Mexican Packet	United Kingdom	The ship ran aground at Smyrna, Ottoman Empire. She was on a voyage from Smyrna to Liverpool, Lancashire.
Oregon	United Kingdom	The ship was driven ashore 1 nautical mile (1.9 km) north of Aberdeen. Her crew were rescued. She was on a voyage from Aberdeen to Dundee, Forfarshire. She was refloated on 1 January 1850 and taken into Aberdeen for repairs.
Victory	United Kingdom	The brig was driven ashore near Fraserburgh, Aberdeenshire. She was on a voyage from Arkhangelsk, Russia to London. She was refloated on 28 November and taken into Fraserburgh.
William and Ann	United Kingdom	The ship ran aground on the Cross Sand, in the North Sea off the coast of Norfolk. She was refloated and beached at Winterton-on-Sea, Norfolk, where she was wrecked. She was on a voyage from Hartlepool, County Durham to London.

== 24 November ==
List of shipwrecks: 24 November 1849
Ship	State	Description
Eœndraght	Belgium	The ship was sighted in the Øresund whilst on a voyage from Saint Petersburg to Antwerp. No further trace, presumed foundered with the loss of all hands.
Isabella	United Kingdom	The ship sprang a leak and was beached at Grimsby, Lincolnshire. She was on a voyage from Arkhangelsk, Russia to London.
John Bell	United Kingdom	The ship ran aground and was damaged at New Ross, County Wexford. She was on a voyage from Quebec City, Province of Canada, British North America to New Ross. She was refloated.
Rammunder	Sweden	The brig was wrecked on the Goodwin Sands, Kent, United Kingdom. Her crew were rescued. She was on a voyage from Copenhagen, Denmark to Rio de Janeiro, Brazil, or Odesa, Russia. She was refloated on 30 November and towed into Margate, Kent.
Sylphide	(Russian Empire) Grand Duchy of Finland	The ship was driven ashore near "Grason", Sweden. Her crew were rescued. She was on a voyage from Jakobstad to Marseille, Bouches-du-Rhône, France.
William and George	United Kingdom	The ship was wrecked on the Mainbank, off the mouth of the River Tay with the loss of her captain.

== 25 November ==
List of shipwrecks: 25 December 1849
Ship	State	Description
Argo	Stettin	The ship was abandoned in the North Sea. Her crew were rescued. She was on a voyage from Stettin to Bordeaux, Gironde, France.
Caledonia	United Kingdom	The paddle steamer ran aground near Hamburg. She was on a voyage from London to Hamburg.
George	United Kingdom	The smack was driven ashore and wrecked at Saltfleet, Lincolnshire. Her crew were rescued. She was on a voyage from Goole, Yorkshire to King's Lynn, Norfolk.
Margaret and Jane	United Kingdom	The ship was driven ashore and sank south of Scarborough, Yorkshire. Her crew were rescued. She was on a voyage from Seaham, County Durham to Scarborough.
Michelet	Danzig	The ship foundered in the North Sea (56°00′N 4°47′E). Her crew were rescued by Albion (United Kingdom). Michelet was on a voyage from Danzig to Portsmouth, Hampshire, United Kingdom.
Whim	United Kingdom	The ship was driven ashore and wrecked at Rattray Head, Aberdeenshire. Her nine crew were rescued by Margaret and Mary (United Kingdom). Whim was on a voyage from Arkhangelsk, Russia to Hull, Yorkshire.
Whitley	United Kingdom	The schooner was wrecked on the Elbow End Sands, off the mouth of the River Tay. Her crew survived. She was on a voyage from Dundee, Forfarshire to Newcastle upon Tyne, Northumberland.

== 26 November ==
List of shipwrecks: 26 November 1849
Ship	State	Description
Active	United Kingdom	The ship was wrecked on the Sunk Sand, in the North Sea off the coast of Essex. All on board were rescued by the smack Henry and Elizabeth (United Kingdom). She was on a voyage from Newcastle upon Tyne, Northumberland to Dublin.
Association	France	The ship was wrecked at Pointe Espagnole, Charente-Maritime with the loss of six lives. She was on a voyage from Curaçao to Bordeaux, Gironde.
Bee	United Kingdom	The brig was driven ashore at Lowestoft, Suffolk. She was on a voyage from Dover, Kent to South Shields, County Durham. She was refloated and taken into Lowestoft.
Bellepheron	(flag) Prussia	The ship was wrecked on Sandhammeren with the loss of all hands.
Conquest	United Kingdom	The ship was driven ashore on the coast of Denmark. She was on a voyage from Saint Petersburg, Russia to an English port. She was refloated and resumed her voyage.
Duke of Cornwall	United Kingdom	The ship ran aground on the Kentish Knock. She was on a voyage from Stettin to Swansea, Glamorgan. She was refloated and put into Ramsgate, Kent in a leaky condition.
Highland Chief	United Kingdom	The ship was driven ashore at Ramsgate. She was on a voyage from Saint Petersburg to Bristol, Gloucestershire. She was refloated and put into Ramsgate in a leaky condition.
Jane	United Kingdom	The brig was driven ashore and severely damaged at Warkworth, Northumberland. Her crew were rescued. She was refloated on 17 December.
Margaretha Catharina	Stettin	The ship was driven ashore and wrecked near Eckernförde, Duchy of Schleswig. She was on a voyage from Stettin to Emden, Kingdom of Hanover.
Margaret and Jane	United Kingdom	The ship was driven ashore and sank at Scarborough, Yorkshire. Her crew were rescued. She was on a voyage from Seaham, County Durham to Scarborough.
Palmerston	United Kingdom	The ship was driven ashore on "Wrangelsholm", in the Baltic Sea. She was on a voyage from Vyborg, Grand Duchy of Finland to Hull, Yorkshire. She had become a wreck by 14 December.
Paul	Russia	The barque was driven ashore at Bolderāja. She was refloated the next day.
Peter and Wilhelm	Denmark	The ship ran aground on the Orehage, in the Baltic Sea. She was on a voyage from Odense to London, United Kingdom. She was refloated and put into Nyborg for repairs.
Petrel	United Kingdom	The brig was driven ashore at Stiffkey, Norfolk. She was on a voyage from Newcastle upon Tyne to Dublin.
St. Andrew	United Kingdom	The ship ran aground in the Saint Lawrence River. She was on a voyage from Quebec City, Province of Canada, British North America to Cardiff, Glamorgan. She was refloated and put into Sydney, Nova Scotia, British North America.
Victorine Melina	France	The ship ran aground on the Longsand, in the North Sea off the coast of Essex. She was on a voyage from Hamburg to Havre de Grâce and Rouen, Seine-Inférieure. She was refloated and put into Ramsgate in a leaky condition.
Zuleika	United Kingdom	The ship ran aground and sank at Cardiff, Glamorgan. She was on a voyage from Cardiff to Southampton, Hampshire.

== 27 November ==
List of shipwrecks: 27 November 1849
Ship	State	Description
Argo	Prussia	The ship was driven ashore and sank near Mablethorpe, Lincolnshire, United Kingdom. She was on a voyage from Kiel to King's Lynn, Norfolk, United Kingdom.
Aurora	Kingdom of Hanover	The ship was wrecked west of Calais, France. She was on a voyage from Emden to Liverpool, Lancashire, United Kingdom.
Balder	Hamburg	The ship was driven ashore near Nienstedten. She was on a voyage from Hamburg to Buenos Aires, Argentina.
Hibernia	Prussia	The ship was driven ashore and wrecked near "Steven's Head", Denmark. She was on a voyage from Memel to an Irish port.
Hopewell	United Kingdom	The ship ran aground on the Herd Sand, in the North Sea off the coast of County Durham. She was on a voyage from South Shields, County Durham to London. She was refloated and taken into South Shields.
Samuel	United Kingdom	The ship ran aground on the Haisborough Sands, in the North Sea off the coast of Norfolk. She was refloated and beached at Horsey, Norfolk. Her crew were rescued. Samuel was on a voyage from Saint Petersburg, Russia to London. She was refloated on 30 November and taken into Great Yarmouth, Norfolk, where she subsequently became a wreck.
Solway	United Kingdom	The ship was in collision with Teazer (United Kingdom) and sank with the loss of four of her nine crew. Survivors were rescued by Teazer.
Thomas Metcalfe	United Kingdom	The brig was driven ashore and wrecked at Madras, India. Her crew were rescued.

== 28 November ==
List of shipwrecks: 28 November 1849
Ship	State	Description
Alberdina	Russia	The ship ran aground off "Drago". She was on a voyage from Riga to Antwerp, Belgium. She was refloated and taken into Copenhagen, Denmark for repairs.
Arabella	Spain	The ship was driven ashore at Portsmouth, New Hampshire, United States.
Ippepandi	Greece	The ship was driven ashore at Dublin, United Kingdom. She was on a voyage from Syros, to Dublin.
HMS Medusa	Royal Navy	The Merlin-class packet boat ran aground and was damaged at Marseille, Bouches-du-Rhône, France. She was on a voyage from London to India. She was refloated and put back to Marseille.
Morning Star	(United Kingdom of Great Britain and Ireland) British North America	The ship was driven ashore and damaged at Breaksea Point, Glamorgan. She was on a voyage from Liverpool, Lancashire to Cardiff, Glamorgan. She was refloated and towed into Cardiff.
Sisters	United Kingdom	The ship was driven ashore on "Drago". She was on a voyage from Kronstadt, Russia to Hull, Yorkshire. She was refloated on 30 November and resumed her voyage.
Vertrouwen	Grand Duchy of Oldenburg	The ship foundered in the Baltic Sea 4 nautical miles (7.4 km) east by south of Jasmund, Prussia with the loss of all but one of her crew. The survivor was rescued by Broerderliefde (Flag unknown).
Victoria	United Kingdom	The ship was driven ashore in Ballycotton Bay. Her crew were rescued.

== 29 November ==
List of shipwrecks: 29 November 1849
Ship	State	Description
Abel	United Kingdom	The schooner was driven ashore at Cairnbulg, Aberdeenshire. She was refloated and resumed her voyage.
Aurora	United Kingdom	The ship was wrecked west of St. Ives, Cornwall. Her crew were rescued. She was on a voyage from Newport, Monmouthshire to Plymouth, Devon.
Diana	(United Kingdom of Great Britain and Ireland) Guernsey	The sloop was wrecked at Saint Peter Port. All on board were rescued. She was on a voyage from Guernsey to Jersey, Channel Islands.
Mona's Isle	(United Kingdom of Great Britain and Ireland) Isle of Man	The paddle steamer struck the quayside at Ramsey and was damaged.
Mystery	United Kingdom	The lugger was run down and sunk by a schooner off North Foreland, Kent with the loss of three of her five crew. Survivors were rescued by the schooner.

== 30 November ==
List of shipwrecks: 30 November 1849
Ship	State	Description
Jones	United Kingdom	The ship was driven ashore and wrecked at "Ballinpool", County Waterford.
Margaret	United Kingdom	The ship was driven ashore on Jura, Inner Hebrides. She was on a voyage from Newcastle upon Tyne, Northumberland to Dublin. She was refloated and resumed her voyage.
Mary and Harriet	United Kingdom	The ship was wrecked on Anticosti Island, Nova Scotia, British North America. Her crew were rescued. She was on a voyage from Quebec City, Province of Canada, British North America to Cardiff, Glamorgan.
Peter and Wilhelm	Denmark	The ship ran aground on the Orehage, in the Baltic Sea. She was on a voyage from Odense to London, United Kingdom. She was refloated and put into Nyborg for repairs.
St. Lucia	United Kingdom	The ship ran aground off Nyborg, Denmark. Her crew were rescued. She was on a voyage from Nyborg to Kjerteminde.

== Unknown date ==
List of shipwrecks: Unknown date in November 1849
Ship	State	Description
Ann	United Kingdom	The ship capsized in the Baltic Sea off "Steven's Klint" before 26 November.
Camerons	United Kingdom	The ship was wrecked on the Arcas Reefs, in the Gulf of Mexico before 13 November. Her crew were rescued.
Constante	Spain	The ship was wrecked off "Morweles", Spanish East Indies before 21 November. She was on a voyage from Manila, Spanish East Indies to Amoy, China.
Dartagnole	United Kingdom	The lugger was driven ashore in Tramore Bay. She was refloated on 20 July 1850 and taken into Waterford.
E. Swift	United States	The barque was wrecked near Mobile, Alabama with the loss of eleven lives.
Eudora	United States	The steamship ran ashore at Cape May, New Jersey and was wrecked.
Falcon	United Kingdom	The ship struck a rock and foundered off Panay, Spanish East Indies before 13 November. Her crew were rescued. She was on a voyage from Sydney, New South Wales to Manila
Inca	France	The barque was driven ashore and wrecked at Talcahuano, Chile.
Inconstant	United Kingdom	The ship was driven ashore on the coast of New Zealand before 8 November. She was refloated and taken into Wellington, where she was condemned.
Iron Queen	United Kingdom	The barque was driven ashore and wrecked on the coast of Florida, United States before 17 November.
Liverpool	United Kingdom	The ferry ran aground and sank in the River Mersey off Seacombe, Cheshire. She was refloated on 5 November, but was thought to be unworthy of repair.
Liverpool	United Kingdom	The schooner was wrecked on a reef 60 nautical miles (110 km) off Nassau, Bahamas before 3 November. She was on a voyage from Ragged Island, Bahamas to New York, United States.
Minnet	Sweden	The ship was driven ashore near "Fanager" before 26 November. She was on a voyage from St. Ubes, Portugal to Gothenburg. She was refloated and completed her voyage, arriving on 19 December.
Orion	(United Kingdom of Great Britain and Ireland) British North America	The schooner foundered in the Atlantic Ocean off the Inishtrahull Lighthouse, County Donegal. Her crew were rescued.
Robin Hood	United Kingdom	The ship was driven ashore on the Swedish coast. She was on a voyage from Stettin to Mistley, Essex. She was refloated and put into Copenhagen, Denmark for repairs.
Rother	United Kingdom	The ship struck a sunken rock between Buceo and the Isla de Flores, Uruguay. She was on a voyage from Liverpool to Montevideo, Uruguay. She completed her voyage to Montevideo, where she was condemned.
Sephora	United Kingdom	The ship was wrecked in the Baltic Sea. Her crew were rescued. She was on a voyage from Liverpool, Lancashire to Narva, Russia.
Titania	Greece	The ship was wrecked on Paxos. Her crew were rescued.
Tonquin	United States	The ship ran aground on Whaleman's Spit, in San Francisco Bay, and was wrecked. She was on a voyage from New York to San Francisco, California.
Victory	United Kingdom	The ship was driven ashore at Plymouth, Devon. She was refloated on 29 November.
William and Mary	United Kingdom	The ship was driven ashore on Hogland, Russia. She was on a voyage from Saint Petersburg, Russia to Liverpool. She had been refloated by 19 November and resumed her voyage.
