= Royal Adelaide (1865 ship) =

Iron sailing ship wrecked on Chesil Beach

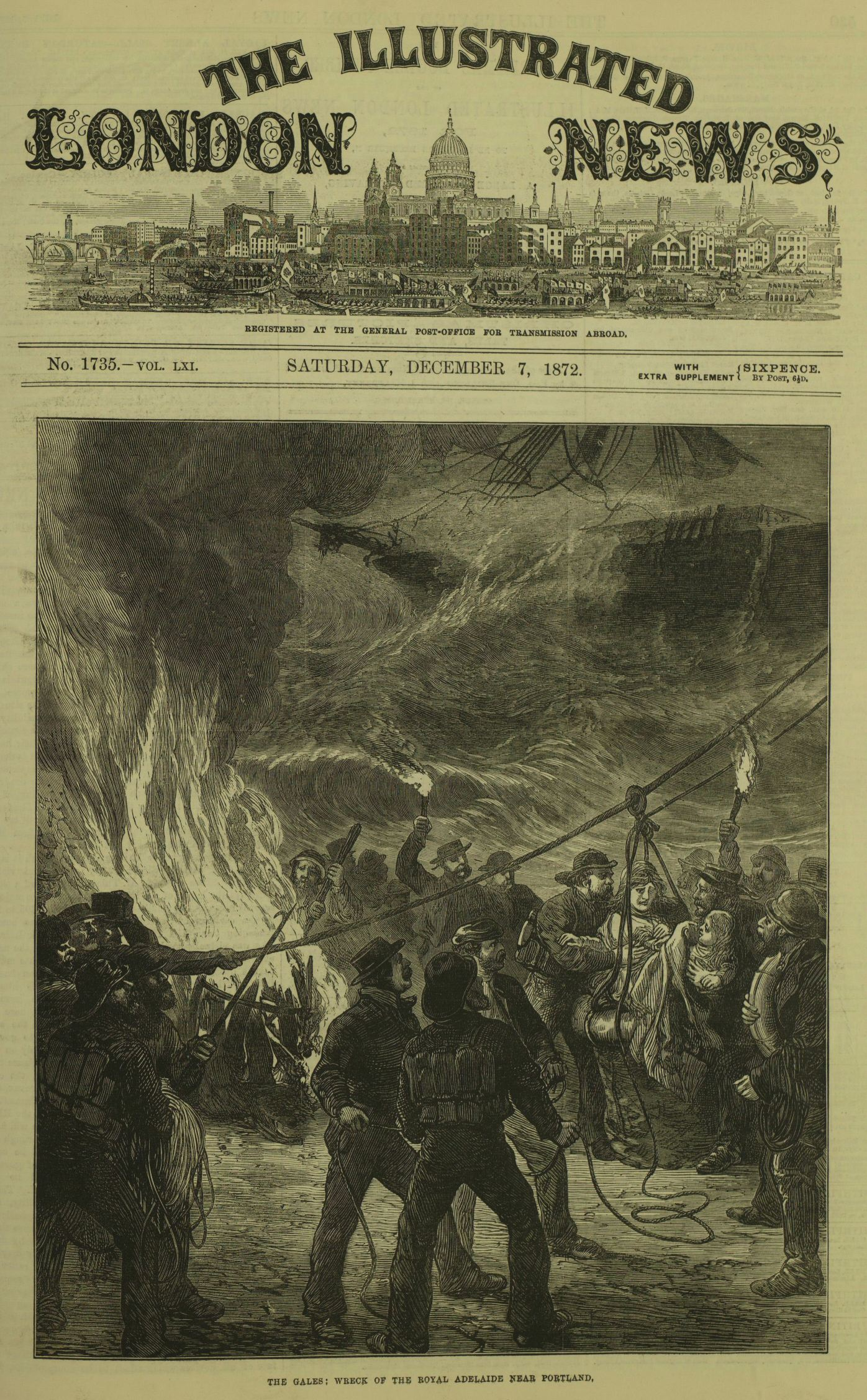
- Rescuers working to save those on the Royal Adelaide near Portland. The Illustrated London News, 1872

History
- Name: Royal Adelaide
- Owner: Gibbs, Bright & Company
- Builder: William Patterson, Bristol
- Launched: 28 January 1865
- Out of service: 25 November 1872
- Fate: Wrecked at 50°34.65′N 2°28.50′W

General characteristics
- Tonnage: 1,298 tons
- Length: 233 ft (71 m)
- Beam: 38 ft (12 m)
- Draught: 23 ft (7.0 m)

Royal Adelaide was an iron sailing ship of 1400 tons built by William Patterson at Bristol in 1865.

She was wrecked on Chesil Beach on 25 November 1872, while on a passage from London to Sydney with 32 crew members and 35 passengers. In bad weather, the ship tried to reach the shelter of Portland Harbour, but was forced into Lyme Bay from which there was no exit in a storm. The anchors were lowered to try to prevent the ship being blown onto Chesil Beach. However, the anchors dragged and the ship began to break up on the beach. All but seven on board were saved.

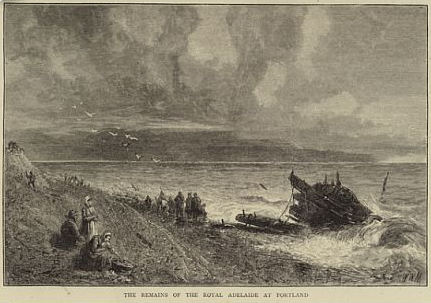
The Remains of the Royal Adelaide at Portland, 1872

A large crowd gathered on the shore to help with the rescue and the salvage of the cargo, part of which was gin and brandy. By the end of the night four of the wreckers had died from exposure, having spent the night on the beach after becoming drunk on the cargo.

She now lies at 50°34.65′N 2°28.50′W OSGB36 and is accessible to scuba divers from the shore.
