= William Patterson Shipbuilders =

Closed shipbuilder in Bristol, England

William Patterson & Son
- Type: Private
- Industry: Shipbuilding
- Founded: 1830
- Defunct: 1869
- Fate: Closed
- Successor: Yards taken over by Claughton (Wapping) and Wapping Dock Co. (Great Western Yard)
- Headquarters: River Avon, UK
- Key people: William Patterson (founder), John Mercer, Jr. (partner), William Patterson, Jr. (son), Isambard Kingdom Brunel

William Patterson Shipbuilders was a major shipbuilder in Bristol, England, during the 19th century and an innovator in ship construction, producing both the SS Great Western and SS Great Britain, fine lined yachts and a small number of warships.

== History ==
=== Origins ===
Patterson, the founder, was born in Arbroath, Scotland, in 1795 and worked his way up from London slop (ready made clothes) seller to shipwright at Rotherhithe, and then foreman at steamship builder William Evans. Here he took charge of the yard for the build of the steam packet Dasher for the Post Office, before moving to Bristol in 1823 to become assistant to William Scott at his ship at Wapping.

When Scott when bankrupt in 1830, Patterson stepped in to take over the yard at East Wapping with partner John Mercer, Jr, as Patterson & Mercer. He also had business in the timber trade and had at least one vessel in operation, the sloop Charles.

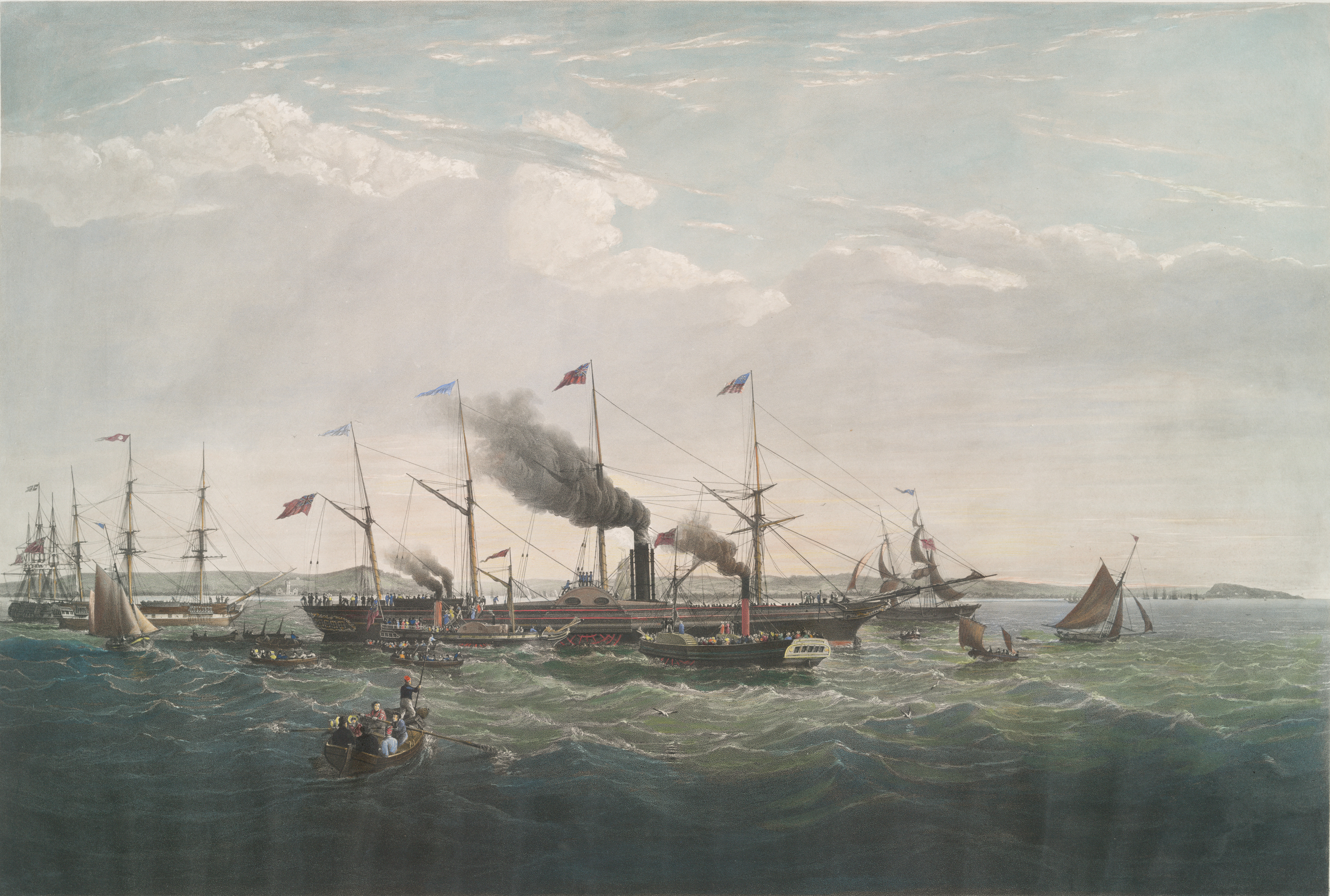
SS Great Western's maiden voyage from Bristol in 1838.

=== Early vessels ===
Patterson’s first vessel was the steam packet County of Pembroke for the Bristol Channel trade, which may have been in frame when he took over the yard from William Scott. The early constructions were traditional, the smack Dispatch and the West Indiaman Edward Colston, but soon he began to produce ground breaking designs, such as the schooner Velox in 1834 built to clipper lines, which surprised conservative Bristol shipowners.

The following vessels were a pair of steam packets, Lady Charlotte in 1834 and Mountaineer in 1835. Both were considered to be finished to a high standard, and lead to an approach by Isambard Kingdom Brunel, Thomas Guppy and the Great Western Steamship Company to build a large passenger steamship for the Bristol to New York City route. By this time Mercer had left the business and it was refashioned William Patterson & Son.

=== Trans-Atlantic steamships ===
Patterson built the first steam vessel designed for regular Atlantic passengers in the SS Great Western a large 1775 grt iron-strapped, wooden, side-wheel paddle steamer, which sailed for maiden voyage on 8 April 1838. The vessel proved very successful and from the beginning of the project in 1839 Patterson was involved in her successor which would become SS Great Britain, employing his own hull lines with an iron hull and screw propulsion and built at the Great Western Yard. Many changes stimulated by Brunel were embodied and she eventually sailed from Bristol in December 1844.

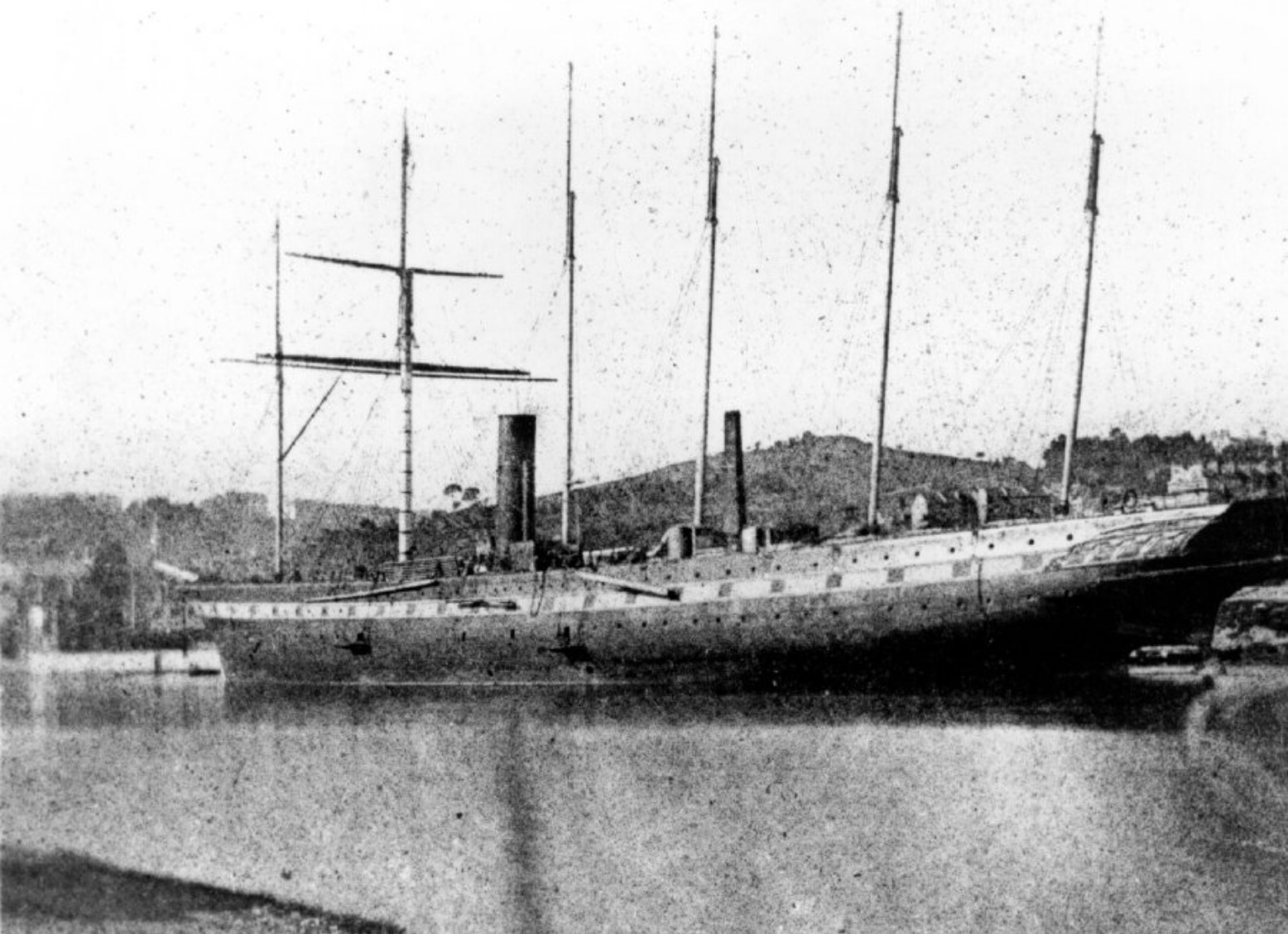
SS Great Britain fitting out in the Cumberland Basin, April 1844.

The experience proved fruitful as Patterson was employed to draw up the hull lines for two large steamships built in Bristol by Acramans for the Royal West India Mail Company, the Avon and Severn, and an order in his own yard for Demerara, a 3000-ton bm vessel built for Royal Mail Steam Packet Company which unfortunately was stranded and almost wrecked in the Avon in 1851. She was rebuilt as the then world’s largest sailing ship and her figurehead still features at the M Shed.

=== Warships ===
The yard’s first warships were three ‘war steamers’ for the navy of the German Confederation, two sisterships Inca and Cacique of 628 tons bm and the larger Cora of 970 tons bm each built with auxiliary steam in 1849, renamed Großherzog von Oldenburg (Inca), Frankfurt (Cacique) and Der Königliche Ernst August (Cora). These were wooden paddle vessels with low-power engines and a full sail plan and built to a strong design on Lang’s improved principle diagonally fastened upon the plan of Sir Robert Seppings.

In 1856, Patterson built two gunboats of the Albacore class, HMS Ernest and HMS Escort carrying 1 × 68-pdr, 1 × 32-pdr and 2 × 20-pdrs, and four mortar vessels with single 13 in mortars for the Royal Navy for use in the Crimean War. The yard made a loss of £21,000 on these orders, and this, followed by a lack of new orders, led to the creditors being called in June 1858, leading to having to sell his assets at Wapping and concentrate business at the Great Western Yard.

=== Yachts ===
Patterson was responsible for a number of pilot cutters and also had a line of yachts built in the yard. The Oriana of 69 tons bm was built in 1852 for G.S. Tritton of the Royal Yacht Squadron, and Patteron himself raced his own iron cutter yacht Cyclone built in a neighbouring Bristol yard.

=== Final ships ===
From 1858 all the company’s vessels were built at the Great Western Yard, starting with the completion of the barque Constance which had been started at the Wapping Yard, and including fast schooners and a number of rebuildings including new screw arrangements on the Royal Bride and the rebuild of French steamship Jacquard which emerged as the Great Victoria.

1864-65 was the final flourish with four large iron three-masters being completed, including Royal Adelaide and Royal Sovereign of 140 tons bm for Fernie Brothers of Liverpool. These were the largest iron sailing ships ever built in Bristol. William Patterson Sr. moved to Liverpool in 1865 (d. 1870), and his son continued at Bristol with a salvage business at Dean’s Marsh.

== William Patterson built ships ==
Major ships built by Patterson & Mercer:

- Dispatch (1831), 27 t bm smack
- County of Pembroke (1831), 110 t bm steam paddlewheel schooner
- Edward Colstan (1833), 276 t bm schooner-barque

Major merchant ships built by William Patterson & Son:

- Eagle (1834), 29 t bm steam paddlewheel sloop
- Lady Charlotte (1834), 75 t bm steam paddlewheel schooner
- Velox (1834), 153 t bm schooner
- Mountaineer (1835), 177 t bm steam paddlewheel schooner
- Great Western (1837), 1775 grt steam paddlewheel 4-masted schooner
- Lucy (1840), 268 t bm barque
- Great Britain (1844), 2936 grt steam screw 6-masted schooner
- Charlotte Jane (1848), 730 t bm ship-rigged merchantman
- Era (1849), 204 t bm brigantine
- Lyra (1851), 242 t bm brigantine
- Demerara (1851), 3000 t bm paddlewheel steamer (finished as sailing vessel)
- Oriana (1852), 56 t bm screw yacht
- Louisa (1852), 317 t bm ship-rigged merchantman
- Batanga (1853), 141 t bm barque
- Venus (1854), 741 t bm ship-rigged merchantman
- Dora (1854), 219 t bm barque
- Constance (1858), 351 t bm barque
- Inez (1860), 109 t bm schooner
- Wye (1861), 108 t bm iron steam paddlewheel schooner
- White Squall (1864), 537 t bm iron barque
- Ladye Love (1864), 501 t bm iron ship-rigged barque
- Royal Sovereign (1864), 1338 t bm iron ship-rigged barque
- Royal Adelaide (1865), 1385 t bm iron ship-rigged merchantman

Warships built by William Patterson & Son:

- Inca (1849), 628 t bm paddlewheel steam gunboat – Großherzog von Oldenburg (1850), 450 t bm paddlewheel steamer
- Cora (1849), 970 t bm paddlewheel steam gunboat – Ernst August (1849), 741 t bm paddlewheel steamer
- Cacique (1849), 628 t bm paddlewheel steam gunboat – Frankfurt (1849), 439 t bm paddlewheel steamer
- No 49 (1856), 166 ton mortar vessel
- No 50 (1856), 166 ton mortar vessel
- No 51 (1856), 166 ton mortar vessel
- No 52 (1856), 166 ton mortar vessel
- Ernest (1856), 233 ton wooden screw gunboat
- Escort (1856), 233 ton wooden screw gunboat

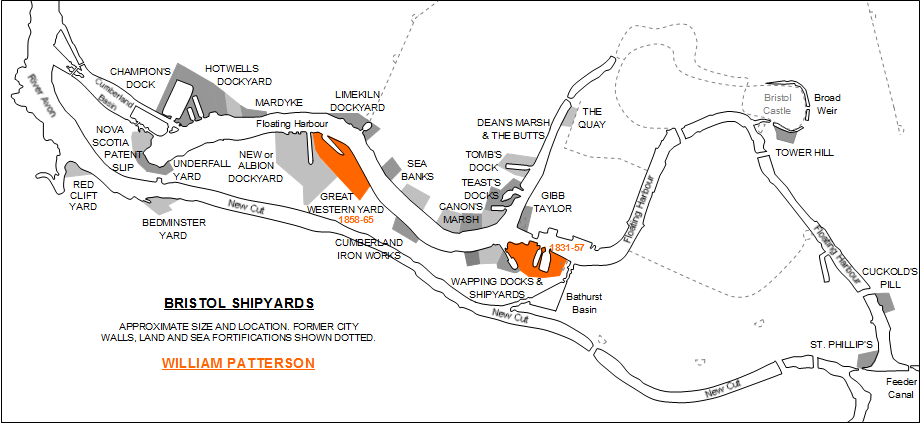
Bristol Shipyards with the location yards operated by William Patterson illustrated.
