= Keystone State (steamboat) =

American paddle steamer

Coordinates: 44°54′6″N 82°44′22″W

- Modern representation of Keystone State off Pointe Aux Barques, in 1857

History

United States
- Name: Keystone State
- Namesake: A nickname for the Commonwealth of Pennsylvania
- Owner: Charles M. Reed (1849–1861); G. Ritter/Frank Handel (1861–1861)
- Port of registry: Presque Isle, Pennsylvania
- Builder: Bidwell & Banta of Buffalo, New York
- Launched: November 11, 1848
- In service: May 1849
- Out of service: November 9 or 10, 1861
- Fate: Sank in a storm on Lake Huron

General characteristics
- Class & type: Paddle steamer
- Tonnage: 1,354 GRT
- Length: 288 feet (87.8 m)
- Beam: 35 feet (10.7 m); 63 feet (19.2 m) (with overhanging guards)
- Depth: 14 feet (4.3 m)
- Installed power: Engine: 1 × 500 hp (370 kW) walking beam engine; Boilers: 2 × firebox boilers
- Propulsion: 2 × paddle wheels almost 40 feet (12.2 m) in diameter
- Capacity: 800 passengers; 6,000 barrels of freight

Keystone State (also spelled Key Stone State) was a wooden-hulled American paddle steamer in service between 1849 and 1861. She was built in 1848 in Buffalo, New York, by Bidwell & Banta for ship-owner Charles M. Reed of Erie, Pennsylvania, and operated as part of his "Chicago Line". A luxuriously furnished palace steamer, she operated between Buffalo and Chicago, Illinois, while also making stops at various other ports. She was built for the passenger and package freight trade, frequently carrying both wealthy passengers and European immigrants who desired to settle in the Midwestern United States. Due to the Panic of 1857, Keystone State and several other paddle steamers were laid up. When the American Civil War began in 1861; she was refurbished, and put back into service.

On November 8, 1861, Keystone State left Detroit for Milwaukee, Wisconsin, under the command of Captain Wilkes Travers. Although her cargo manifest listed her cargo as farm machinery, it was rumored that this was a cover for military supplies and gold. She was last seen off Port Austin, Michigan, struggling in a storm, and eventually sank with the loss of all 33 people on board. Keystone State's fate was unknown for over a week, until pieces of wreckage washed ashore.

The location of Keystone State's wreck remained a mystery for 151 years, until it was found in July 2013 by shipwreck hunter David Trotter. The wreck rests in nearly 175 feet (53.3 m) of water northeast of Harrisville, Michigan, about 40 to 50 miles (64.4 to 80.5 km) from where Keystone State was last seen afloat.

== History ==
=== Design and construction ===
Keystone State in Buffalo, New York, before her engines were installed

Keystone State (also spelled Key Stone State) was built in 1848 by Bidwell & Banta of Buffalo, New York. By the time she was completed, Keystone State was the second largest ship on the Great Lakes, after the paddle steamer Empire State. She was named in honor of the Commonwealth of Pennsylvania. Keystone State was a so-called palace steamer, a class of Great Lakes paddle steamers known for their lavish interiors. Maritime historian Robert McGreevy wrote that the interiors of palace steamers "were made to look like the finest hotels", and had "leaded glass windows and carved arches and mahogany trim". Keystone State had two funnels, a 16 foot (4.9 m) by 230 foot (70.1 m) dining room, 70 large state rooms, and could accommodate 800 passengers and 6,000 barrels of freight. The joiner work for Keystone State was done by carpenter John M. Smith. Newspapers reported that her main cabin was designed by a Captain E. Powers, although Smith later claimed to have designed it.

Keystone State's wooden hull was 288 feet (87.8 m) long, while her beam was 35 feet (10.7 m) wide. (Note: Some sources list her length as 279 feet (85.0 m) or 278.10 feet (84.8 m).) At her main deck, Keystone State had overhanging hull guards, which brought her overall beam to 63 feet (19.2 m). Her hull was 14 feet (4.3 m) deep. She had a gross tonnage of 1354 tons.

She was powered by a 500 hp (370 kW) single cylinder walking beam engine, the cylinder of which was 65 inches (165.1 cm) in diameter, and had a stroke of 10 feet (3.0 m). The engine was manufactured in New York City. Steam for the engine was provided by two firebox boilers. Keystone State was propelled by two paddle wheels that were nearly 40 feet (12.2 m) in diameter. She was launched on November 11, 1848.

=== Service history ===
In 1849, Keystone State was enrolled in Presque Isle, Pennsylvania. Built for ship-owner Charles M. Reed of Erie, Pennsylvania, Keystone State became part of his "Chicago Line". Keystone State made two trips to Erie and Detroit, Michigan, respectively, to test her machinery. That same month, she began traveling between Buffalo and Chicago, Illinois, while also making stops at other ports such as Sandusky, Ohio, and Milwaukee, Wisconsin. Built for the passenger and package freight trade, she frequently carried both affluent passengers and European immigrants who desired to settle in the Midwestern United States. She also carried barreled goods, such as flour.

In October 1849, Keystone State was damaged and disabled in a gale on Lake Michigan, breaking one of her "hogging arches". On April 15, 1850, Keystone State rescued the passengers of the paddle steamer Atlantic, which had run aground on Point Pelee. On June 8 that same year, Keystone State collided with the schooner Comfort Ann off Rocky River, Ohio. Keystone State rescued the crew of the schooner S.F. Gale, which sank in a collision with the schooner Telegraph in the Detroit River on November 11, 1850.

Keystone State traveled to Put-in-Bay, Ohio, on August 6, 1851. On December 17 that same year, while running between Buffalo, Dunkirk, New York, and Detroit, with 3,500 barrels of flour and 1,000 dressed pigs, Keystone State became trapped in ice at Malden, Ontario. She began making regular trips between Dunkirk and Detroit in 1852. On November 12, 1852, the crew of Keystone State sighted a steamboat, which they believed to be Oneida. She had been lost with all hands, and was floating 9 miles (14.5 km) off Dunkirk. The following day, Keystone State and another paddle steamer, Lady Elgin, were damaged while attempting to enter Dunkirk harbor during a storm. On November 18, the Daily News of Kingston, Ontario, reported an unconfirmed rumor that Keystone State and Empire State had collided near Erie.

On October 10, 1853, one of Keystone State's boilers exploded in the lower Detroit River, after one of her flues collapsed. She did not sustain major damage, and was towed to Detroit for repairs by the paddle steamer Mayflower. In 1854, Keystone State arrived in Buffalo with a bad leak. She sustained $3,000 (equivalent to $82,000 in 2024) worth of damage, and was dry docked for repairs. In 1855, Keystone State ran between Collingwood, Ontario, and Chicago, while also making stops in Sault Ste. Marie, Michigan.

While running between Collingwood and Chicago on September 18, 1856, Keystone State sprang a leak in a gale on Lake Michigan; her starboard cabin was also smashed in. She was repaired in Detroit. Due to the Panic of 1857, Keystone State and several other paddle steamers were laid up. When the American Civil War began in 1861, she was refurbished, and put back into service. She was sold on October 30, 1861; her owners included G. Ritter and Frank Handel. Keystone State re-entered service on November 7, when she arrived in Detroit.

=== Final voyage ===
On November 8, 1861, Keystone State left Detroit for Milwaukee under the command of Captain Wilkes Travers. Although her manifest listed her cargo as farm machinery, historians now believe that it had been intentionally mislabeled, and she was carrying gold military supplies intended to be used in the Civil War. She was last seen by the schooner Bronson off Port Austin, Michigan, rolling in a storm, and appeared to be disabled. She sank on either November 9 or 10, with the loss of all 33 of her crew. No bodies from Keystone State were ever recovered.

Keystone State's fate was unknown for over a week, until pieces of her wreck were spotted on November 21. On November 23, the Detroit Free Press reported that while off Pointe Aux Barques, the steamer City of Cleveland had passed through "large quantities of what they took to be the upper works of some wrecked steamer", later determined to be from Keystone State. A day later, they reported that "part of a guard rail, part of a wheel and a portion of a paddle box of a large steamer" had washed ashore at White Rock, Michigan. The schooner Lookout encountered wreckage such as cabins and a pilot house off Pointe Aux Barques on November 23. The pilot house washed ashore near Lexington, Michigan.

== Wreck ==
The wreck of Keystone State

Shipwreck hunter David Trotter of Canton, Michigan, located the wreck of Keystone State on the weekend of July 6–7, 2013, using side-scan sonar. The wreck was found 25 miles (40.2 km) to 30 miles (48.3 km) northeast of Harrisville, Michigan, (roughly 40 miles (64.4 km) to 50 miles (80.5 km) north of where she was last seen), in nearly 175 feet (53.3 m) of water. Trotter and his team, Undersea Research Associates, were able to identify Keystone State's wreck based on her size and features, as she was the only paddle steamer of that size still missing in Lake Huron. The wreck is in a semi-collapsed state, encrusted with zebra mussels. Keystone State's stern is relatively broken up, while her engine, boilers and paddle wheels are all still standing, and are in relatively good condition. Trotter and his dive team were unable to find any of the farm machinery or rumored gold, speculating that Keystone State's crew jettisoned the cargo in an attempt to keep her afloat. The wreck is surrounded by a large debris field.

== Sources ==
- Alpena County George N. Fletcher Public Library (2021). "Keystone State (1849, Steamer)". Alpena, Michigan: Alpena County George N. Fletcher Public Library.
- "American Progress". Buffalo, New York: The Buffalo Commercial. 1849 – via Newspapers.com.
- "An Immense Freight". Detroit, Michigan: Detroit Free Press. 1851 – via Newspapers.com.
- "Another Arrival". Detroit, Michigan: Detroit Free Press. 1852 – via Newspapers.com.
- Associated Press (2013). "Shipwreck hunter reports finding steamer Keystone State that sank in 1861 in Lake Huron". Toledo, Ohio: The Blade.
- Berry, Sterling (2021). "Keystone State". Detroit, Michigan: Great Lakes Vessel Histories.
- "Collision – Brig Sunk". Buffalo, New York: The Buffalo Commercial. 1850 – via Newspapers.com.
- "Collisions By Steam". Buffalo, New York: Buffalo Courier. 1850 – via Newspapers.com.
- "Damage to the Key Stone State". Buffalo, New York: Buffalo Courier. 1853 – via Newspapers.com.
- Ellison, Garret (2013). "Remains of Civil War-era shipwreck rumored to carry gold found in Lake Huron". Grand Rapids, Michigan: Booth Newspapers.
- "Explosion of the Steamer Keystone State". New York City, New York: The New York Times. 1853 – via Newspapers.com.
- "For the Buffalo Commercial Advertiser". Buffalo, New York: The Buffalo Commercial. 1849.
- "Gale on Lake Erie". Kingston, Ontario: The Kingston Daily News. 1852 – via Newspapers.com.
- Gardner, Don (2013). "Civil War-era shipwreck discovered in Lake Huron". Troy, Michigan: The Oakland Press.
- "In Search of the Wreck of the Keystone State". Detroit, Michigan: Detroit Free Press. 1861 – via Newspapers.com.
- "Last Night's Report". Kingston, Ontario: The Kingston Whig-Standard. 1850 – via Newspapers.com.
- "Loss of the Oneida". Buffalo, New York: The Buffalo Commercial. 1852 – via Newspapers.com.
- "Marine Disaster". Kingston, Ontario: The Kingston Daily News. 1852 – via Newspapers.com.
- "Marine Disasters – Steamer Nile Ashore". Buffalo, New York: Buffalo Courier. 1849 – via Newspapers.com.
- "Marine Disasters for 1854". Buffalo, New York: The Buffalo Commercial. 1855 – via Newspapers.com.
- "Marine Intelligence". Buffalo, New York: The Buffalo Commercial. 1861 – via Newspapers.com.
- "Marine Intelligence – Buffalo, September 25". Buffalo, New York: The Buffalo Daily Republic. 1856 – via Newspapers.com.
- Michigan Radio (2013). "After 150 years, Keystone State steamer discovered in the Lake Huron". Ann Arbor, Michigan: University of Michigan.
- "More of the Keystone State". Detroit, Michigan: Detroit Free Press. 1861 – via Newspapers.com.
- Pennsylvania Historical and Museum Commission (2001). "Symbols of Pennsylvania". Harrisburg, Pennsylvania: Pennsylvania Historical and Museum Commission. Archived from the original on October 14, 2007.
- "Pleasure Excursion". Detroit, Michigan: Detroit Free Press. 1851 – via Newspapers.com.
- "Probable Loss of the Keystone State". Grand Haven, Michigan: The Grand Haven News. 1861 – via Newspapers.com.
- "Propeller Oneida". Buffalo, New York: The Buffalo Daily Republic. 1852 – via Newspapers.com.
- "Steam Boat Arrangements on Lake Erie". Kingston, Ontario: The Kingston Daily News. 1852 – via Newspapers.com.
- "Steamboat Lines and Appointments for the Season of 1849". Detroit, Michigan: Detroit Free Press. 1849 – via Newspapers.com.
- "Supposed Loss of the Keystone State". Detroit, Michigan: Detroit Free Press. 1861 – via Newspapers.com.
- Swayze, David (2001). "Great Lakes Shipwrecks – K". Port Huron, Michigan: Boatnerd. Archived from the original on April 17, 2002.
- "The Key–Stone State". Buffalo, New York: The Buffalo Commercial. 1849.
- "The Keystone State". Buffalo, New York: The Buffalo Commercial. 1849.
- "The Keystone State". Buffalo, New York: The Buffalo Daily Republic. 1849.
- "The Keystone State". Buffalo, New York: Buffalo Courier. 1861 – via Newspapers.com.
- Thomas Jewett & Company (1849). "The Commercial Advertiser Directory for the City of Buffalo". Buffalo, New York.
- "The Steamers Keystone State and Baltic". Detroit, Michigan: Detroit Free Press. 1861 – via Newspapers.com.
- United Press International (2013). "Civil War-era steamship Keystone State found in Lake Huron". Boca Raton, Florida: United Press International.
- Wisconsin Historical Society (2015). "Lookout Shipwreck (Schooner)" (PDF). Madison, Wisconsin: Wisconsin Historical Society.
- Zaniewski, Ann (2013). "Great Lakes shipwreck hunter finds Keystone State, lost in Lake Huron for 152 years". Detroit, Michigan: Detroit Free Press. Archived from the original on December 9, 2013.
