= Erik Borresen =

Norwegian ship

History

Norway
- Name: Erik Borresen
- Owner: Erik Børresen
- Builder: Erik Børresen
- Out of service: 16 November 1849
- Fate: wrecked on De Westen, Texel, the Netherlands on 16 November 1849

General characteristics
- Type: Brig

Erik Borresen was a 19th-century Norwegian brig. The captain of the ship was captain J. C. Hesselberg. On 16 November 1849 the ship wrecked on De Westen, Texel, the Netherlands, drowning all ten people on board.

The ship was built, owned and named after Erik Børresen (1785–1860).

== Fate ==
While on a voyage from Drammen, Norway to Cornwall, United Kingdom, with a load of wood, the ship disappeared in during the late evening of 16 November 1849 and wrecked on De Westen, Texel, the Netherlands. All ten people on board drowned. The ship and its cargo was salvaged. In the morning of 19 November 1849, the bodies of the captain J. C. Hesselberg and the carpenter washed up on the beach. Items also washed ashore, such as a mirror with the name "Leuntje" and a painted nameplate of "Arthur". In the later days more items were found including a ship's boat with the name Henry Towner on the back, a mast, a water barrel and many (large) pieces of wood. A call was made in the newspaper for the owner to come forward. Texel beachcombers were accused of 'an insatiable appetite for plunder'.
