= USS Baltimore (1848) =

Armed US Navy supply and dispatch steamer in the American Civil War

History

United States
- Name: USS Baltimore
- Builder: Birely & Son
- Launched: 1848
- Completed: 1848
- Acquired: (by USN): Apr 21, 1861
- Commissioned: Apr 1861 – May 22, 1865
- In service: 1848–68?
- Identification: US registry #2310
- Fate: Sold, 1865; abandoned, 1868

General characteristics
- Type: Sidewheel steamer
- Tonnage: 477 tons burthen
- Length: 200 ft (61 m)
- Beam: 26 ft 8 in (8.13 m)
- Depth of hold: 10 ft (3 m)
- Armament: 1 × 32-pounder smoothbore gun

The third USS Baltimore was an armed sidewheel steamer in the United States Navy.

Baltimore was built in 1848 at Philadelphia, Pennsylvania, captured on the Potomac River between Aquia Creek and Washington, D.C., by the Army on April 21, 1861, turned over to the Navy Department, and commissioned in April 1861, Lieutenant J. H. Russell in command.

== Service history ==
During the American Civil War the Baltimore was used as an ordnance vessel between Washington Navy Yard and nearby ammunition depots. She was also used to ferry Army troops across the Potomac River, and saw some service with the North Atlantic Blockading Squadron as a dispatch and supply vessel.

On 19 May 1861, she ran aground at the mouth of the Potomac River and was attacked by a Confederate States Navy ram. Nine people were killed. She was refloated with assistance from USS Mount Vernon. On May 9, 1862, she transported President Abraham Lincoln, and Secretaries Edwin M. Stanton and Salmon P. Chase, from Fort Monroe to Norfolk, Virginia, in an attempt to get a close view of the destroyed Confederate ironclad CSS Virginia.

Baltimore was turned over to Norfolk Navy Yard on May 22, 1865, and sold on June 24, 1865, at Washington DC. She was redocumented for merchant service on 22 February 1866, and abandoned in 1868.
