= William Patterson (engineer) =

Scottish engineer and boatbuilder

William Patterson (1795–1869) was a Scottish engineer and boatbuilder.

Born in Arbroath, he moved to London where he learned his craft at the yard of William Evans. He then moved to Bristol where he worked for William Scott as his assistant. When Scott became bankrupt, he took over his yard in various guises as William Patterson Shipbuilders. He won the contract to design and build the SS Great Western with Isambard Kingdom Brunel.

He was also one of the designers of the SS Great Britain (again with Brunel), the world's first ocean-going ship to have an iron hull and a screw propeller. He was born in 1795, married to Eliza Manning in 1825, had eleven children, and died in 1869 in Liverpool. He is buried in an unmarked grave in Liverpool's Toxteth Cemetery.
