= Louisiana (steamboat) =

Exploded 1849 New Orleans, killed 150+

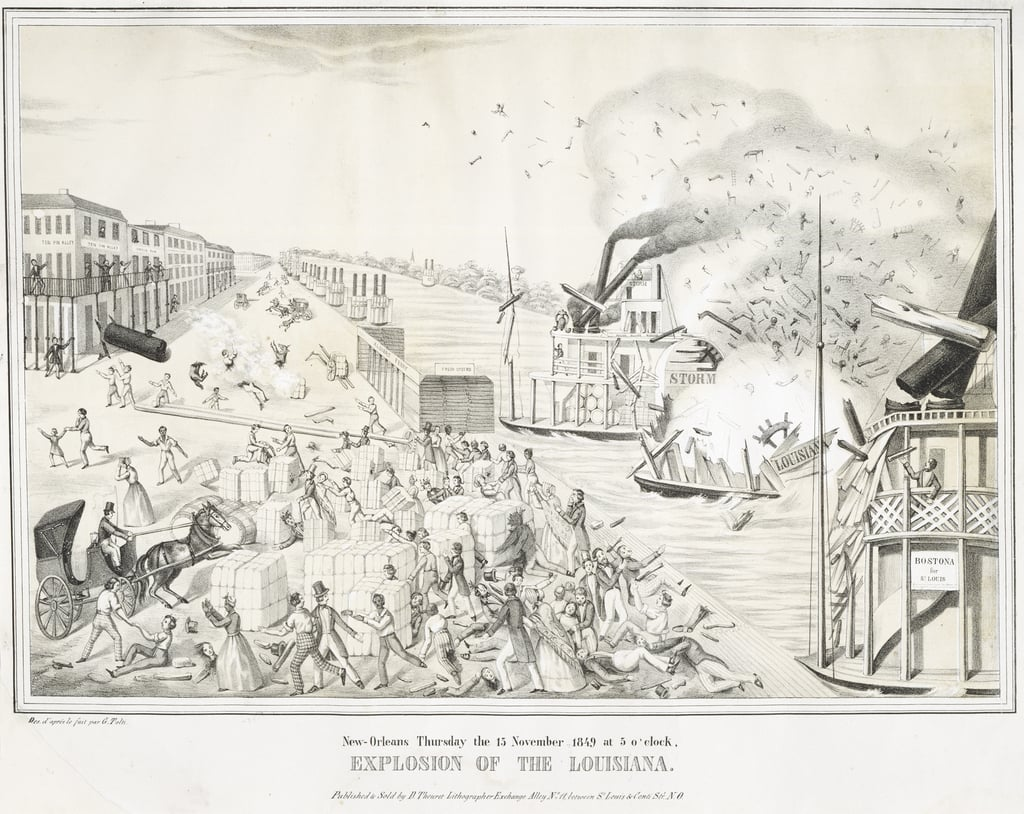
New Orleans Thursday the 15 of November 1849 at 5 o'clock, Explosion of the Louisiana (Dominique Theuret, after G. Tolti, Museum of Fine Arts Houston object B.99.15)

The Louisiana was a Mississippi River steamboat that exploded on November 15, 1849, killing at least 150 and possibly as many as 200 people, and grievously wounding scores of others. All of the boilers exploded simultaneously about five minutes after she pulled away from the dock at Gravier Street in New Orleans; the entire boat sank 10 minutes after the explosion. Several of the dead were on the steamer Storm, which was docked adjacent to the Louisiana.
