= William Scott Shipbuilders =

William Scott & Son
- Company type: Private
- Industry: Shipbuilding, Shipowner
- Founded: 1823 or 1824
- Defunct: 1831
- Fate: Closed
- Successor: Yard taken over by William Patterson
- Headquarters: River Avon, UK
- Key people: William Scott (founder), William Patterson, Christopher Scott, Sir Robert Seppings, James Mullen Scott (son), John Scott, Sr.

William Scott Shipbuilders was a short-lived shipbuilder in Bristol, England in the 19th century and an early producer of steamships. The yard was important in the development of Bristol Shipbuilding. Scott's assistant, William Patterson, went on to build SS Great Britain.

== History ==
=== Origins & Shipowning ===
The founder, William Scott (b. 1756), was part of a well known Scottish shipbuilding family from Greenock, and moved to Barnstaple, England, in the late-18th century to engage in the timber trade. With Christopher Scott (probably his brother) he purchased his first vessel in around 1810, the barque William for the New Brunswick to Baltic route. They later acquired a number of vessels including the sloop Pomona of 32 t, which they used as a packet on the Greenock-Bristol run.

=== Shipbuilding ===
Hilhouse vacated the shipyard and dry-dock at Wapping on the south side of the River Avon in 1824, and Scott seized the opportunity to enter shipbuilding with his son, James Mullen Scott, as William Scott & Son. William Patterson joined the firm as Scott's assistant and together they built the steam packet Lord Beresford for the Channel Islands run. The engine was fitted out by Price Bros. of Neath. Scott may also have built the steamship Bristol in 1823, for the Swansea to Bristol service, making that the first vessel built by the firm. Both were constructed to the plans of Sir Robert Seppings, Surveyor of the Navy.

Several sail and steam vessels followed, including the first steamship entirely constructed in Bristol, the packet Wye in 1826 and several West Indiamen. Despite steady output from the yard and activity in the timber trade, William Scott was called in by the creditors in 1830, and the final vessel, the steamer Nautilus was completed in 1831. William Patterson took over the yard at Wapping later that year and ran it until the late 1850s.

=== William Scott built ships ===
Major ships built by William Scott & Son:

- Bristol (1823), steam paddlewheel packet (probably built by Scott).
- Lord Beresford (1824), 81 t steam paddlewheel schooner (sold out of service 1861).
- Isabella (1825), 340 t ship-rigged merchantman
- Dryade (1825 ship), 266 tons, ship-rigged merchantman
- Camel (1825), 50 t sloop.
- Wye (1826), 60 t steam paddlewheel schooner.
- Avon (1826), 243 t barque.
- Worcestor (1827), 41 t steam paddlewheel schooner.
- Somerset (1827), 81 t brigantine schooner.
- Julia (1827), 403 t ship-rigged merchantman.
- Lady Fitzherbert (1828), 386 t ship-rigged barque (lost in the Gulf of Finland, 1856.
- Eclipse (1828), 31 t steam paddlewheel schooner.
- Francis Smith (1828), 581 t ship-rigged merchantman.
- Britannia (1829), 411 t ship-rigged merchantman.
- Nautilus (1831), 50 t steam paddlewheel schooner.

Bristol Shipyards with the location of William Scott & Son at East Wapping highlighted.
