= Ernst August (ship) =

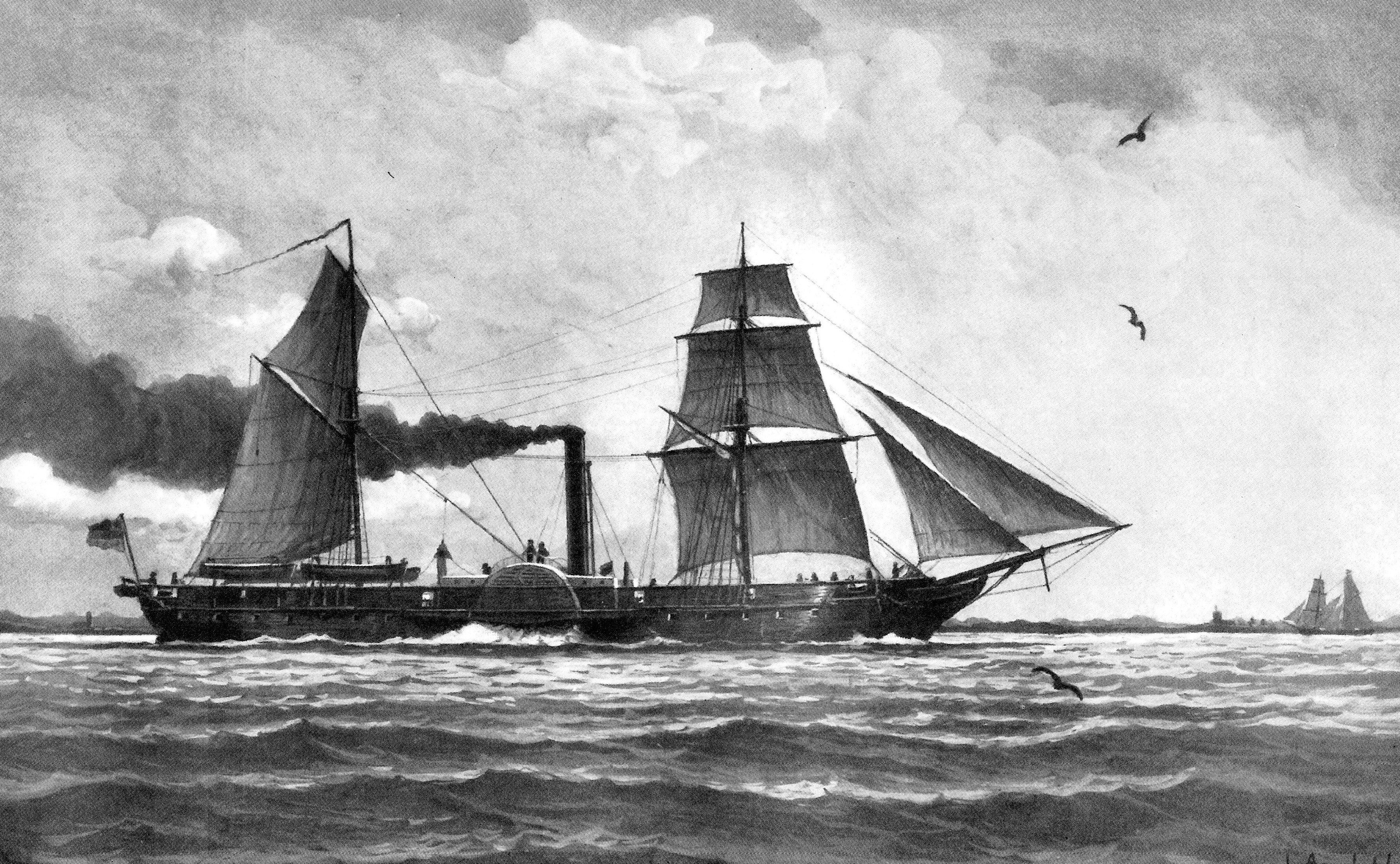
The ship in 1850

Ernst August was a wooden paddle steamer and corvette in the navy of the German Confederation, named after Ernest Augustus, King of Hanover.

== Specifications ==
She had a 580 tonne displacement and was 49.21 m long along the waterline and 55.47 m long in total. At her widest point she was 9.72 m and across her wheel arches she was 17.1 m wide. Her maximum draught was 3.96 m and her propulsion were two paddle wheels driven by two horizontal single-cylinder reciprocating steam engines manufactured by Miller Ravenhill, a London firm. The engine produced about 950 PSi and gave her a speed of 9 knots. Each wheel had twelve blades and a diameter of 5.79 m. The engines supplied three boilers generating around 1 atm steam pressure, housed with the engines themselves in a 16.15 m long engine room. She carried 200 tonnes of coal to power the engines, but was also rigged as a two-masted schooner. Her armament was six 68-pounder guns and her crew was five officers and 145 NCOs and men. Großherzog von Oldenburg and Frankfurt were built to the same design.

== History ==
She was built by the shipbuilder William Patterson in Bristol for the German Confederation. She was launched as Cora in 1848 - the exact date is unknown. She cost 150,000 taler. Under a British flag she sailed to Bremerhaven, where she was transferred to the German Confederation and renamed Ernst Augustus, entering service in October 1848. According to Lüder Arenhold, she was "a very nice model" ("ein sehr hübsches Modell") and according to several contemporary sources the most beautiful ship in the German fleet. She is said to have reached 11 knots during her proving trials.

On 12 December 1852, she was auctioned at Brake, Lower Saxony and bought by the London-based General Steam Navigation Company, which renamed her Edinburgh and from March 1853 used her for voyages to Europe. In March 1855, she travelled to Varna, Bulgaria and the Ottoman Empire, where she was lost under unknown circumstances. Varna was then a logistics centre for Turkey, France and Britain whilst they fought the Crimean War and so Edinburgh seems to have been serving as a transport ship.

== Bibliography ==
- Gröner, Erich / Dieter Jung / Martin Maass: Die deutschen Kriegsschiffe 1815–1945. Band 1: Panzerschiffe, Linienschiffe, Schlachtschiffe, Flugzeugträger, Kreuzer, Kanonenboote. Bernard & Graefe Verlag, München 1982, ISBN 3-7637-4800-8, S. 108.
- Kludas, Arnold: Die Schiffe der Deutschen Reichsflotte. In: Walther Hubatsch: Die erste deutsche Flotte 1848-1854. Mittler, Herford u. a. 1981, ISBN 3-8132-0124-4, (Deutsche Marine-Akademie und Deutsches Marine Institut Schriftenreihe 1), S. 51–60.
- Arenhold, Lüder: Die deutsche Reichsflotte 1848-1852. Reimer, Berlin 1906, (Neudruck: Neu herausgegeben von Uwe Greve mit zwei Farbbildern aus Neuruppiner Bilderbögen. DBM-Media-Verlag, Berlin 1995, ISBN 3-930541-07-6).
