= Palace steamer =

Luxurious passenger and cargo steamships on the North American Great Lakes

Palace steamer is a term sometimes used to describe the largest and finest class of American passenger steamboats of their day. The term was used from almost the earliest era of American steam navigation, and continued to be employed up until at least the late 19th century.

The term was employed for steamboats in many parts of the United States, including the Great Lakes, the East Coast, the Hudson River and the Mississippi River, to name some of the more prominent regions.

== Sources ==
- University of Wisconsin Sea Grant Institute website
