= Erik Børresen =

Norwegian ship owner, merchant and philanthropist

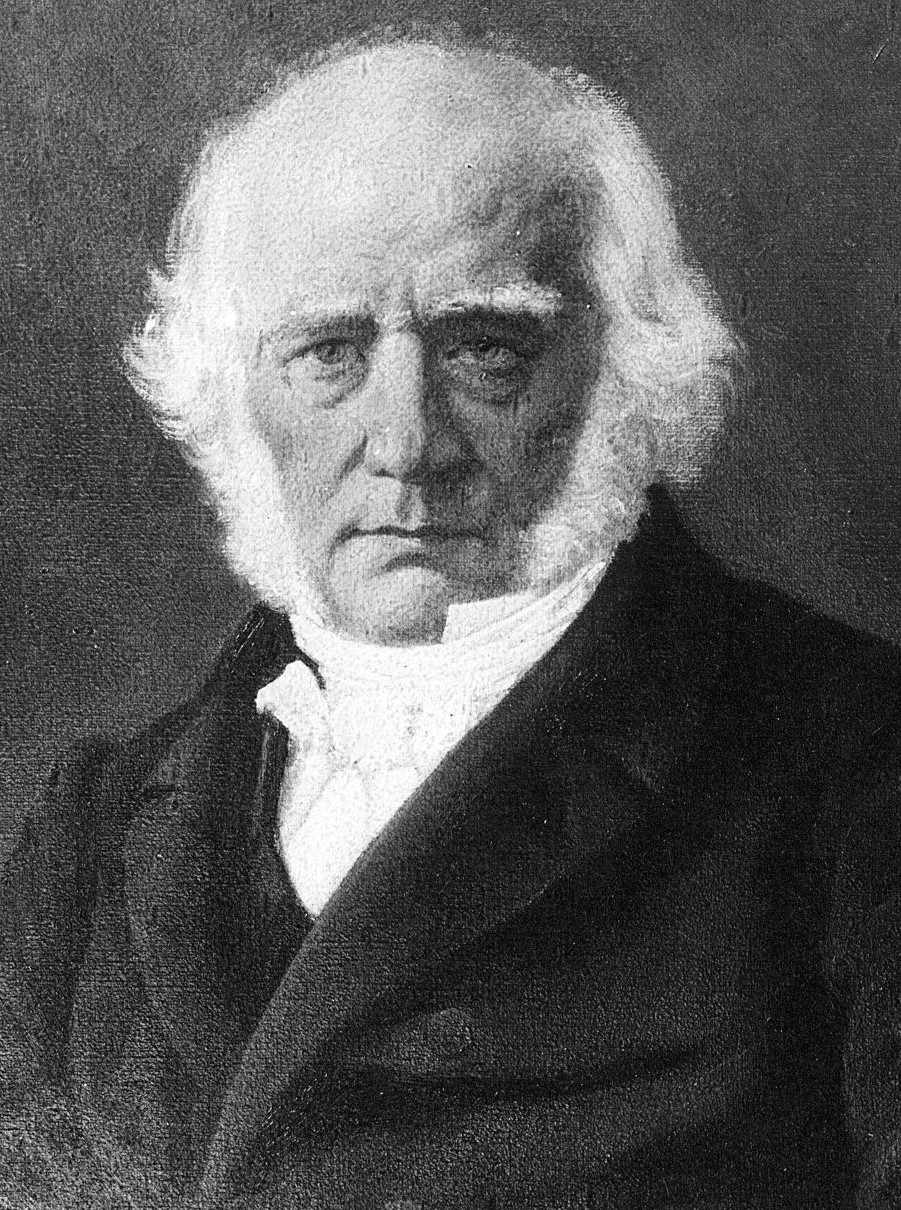
Erik Andreas Børresen

Erik Børresen (17 September 1785 – 14 January 1860) was a Norwegian ship owner, merchant and philanthropist.

== Biography ==
Erik Andreas Børresen as born in the Bragernes neighborhood of Drammen in Buskerud, Norway. He was the son of Lars Børresen (1753–1810) and Karen Flor Robsahm (1764–1825). He followed in his father's footsteps and entered the timber trade. Initially he concentrated the shipping activities on the United Kingdom and the Netherlands. He later established himself as a wholesaler of both lumber and grain. During the 1830s, he built several ships in Hurum and later he established his own shipyard in Bragernes. Børresen owned the first Norwegian ships to sail to China. By the 1840s, he had become the owner-operator of one of the largest shipping companies in Drammen.

Børresen participated in local politics and was elected to the Norwegian Parliament in 1827. Børresen was deputy in 1836, and was elected as a permanent representative to the parliamentary assembly in 1845. Børresen was elected to the first board of the Drammen stock exchange (Drammens børs) in 1839.

== Personal life and legacy ==
In 1813, he married Anne Hermine Schioldborg (1791–1855), daughter of agent Christian Anker Schioldborg (1768–1819) and Alethe Sophia Hammond (1772–1820). Their marriage was childless. At the time of his death, the bulk of his fortune he bequeathed to the Erik Børresen Foundation (Erik Børresens Stiftelse) which first operated an orphanage and later an educational institution, now Børresen School (Børresen skole) on Hauges gate in Drammen.

== Related reading ==
- Borgen, Per Otto (2003) Kong Erik : Erik Børresen og hans stiftelse (Drammen : Erik Børresens stiftelse) ISBN 9788230301128
