= Mutton Island, County Galway =

Island in Ireland

Mutton Island
Native name: Inis Caorach
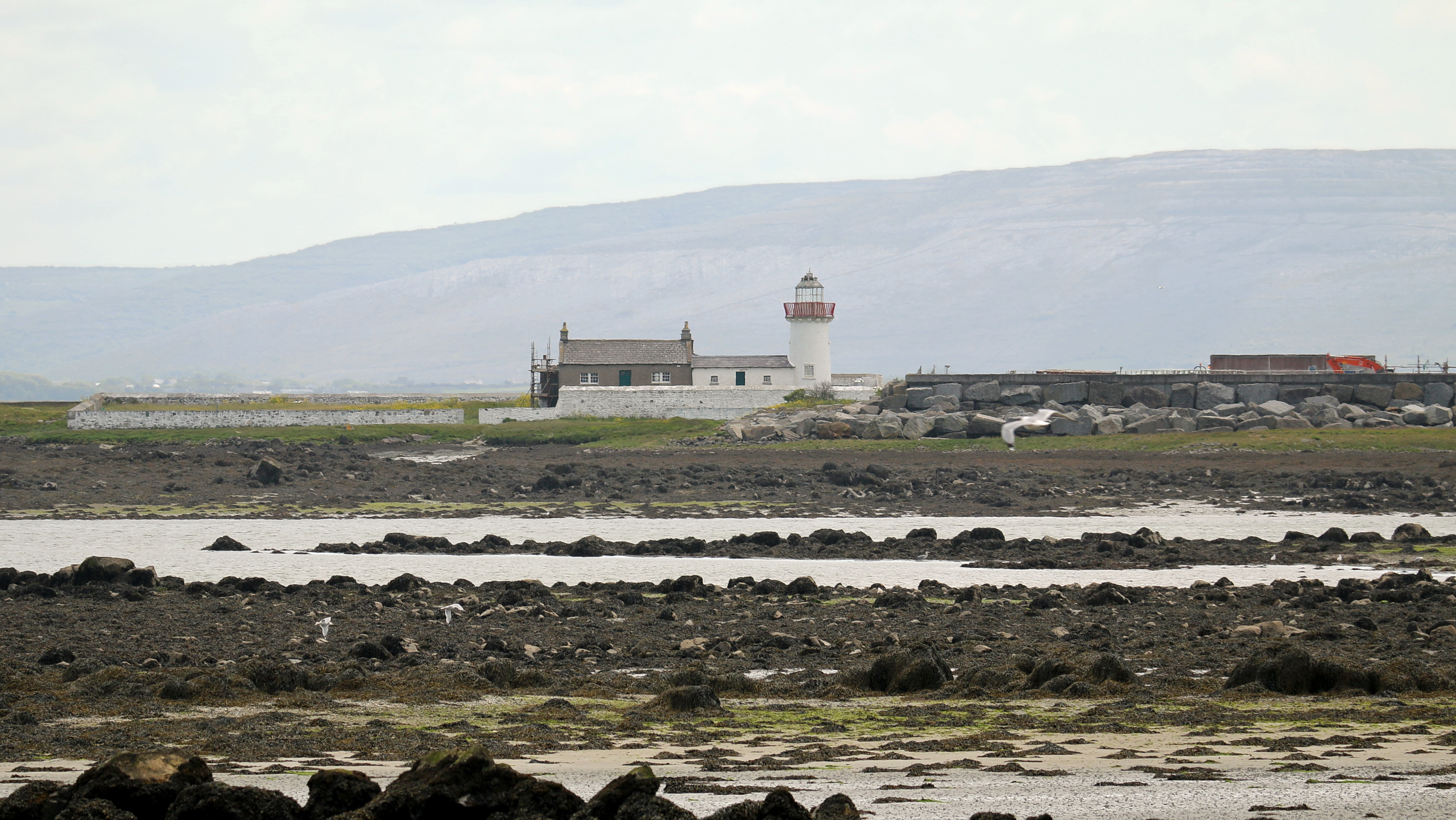
- Mutton Island lighthouse seen from Galway

- Location within island of Ireland

Geography
- Location: Atlantic Ocean
- Coordinates: 53.253°N 9.054°W

Administration
- Ireland
- Province: Connacht
- County: Galway

Demographics
- Population: 0

Mutton Island, historically 'Inishkeragh' (Irish: Inis Caorach), is a small island about 1km off the coast of Galway City, Ireland. It is joined to the mainland by a manmade causeway. It is home to a sewage treatment plant and light house. The island as no permanent residents and is generally only visited by those working on the sewage plant. After treatment, the sewage water is pumped out to sea.

Historical population

Year	Pop.	±%
1841	0	—
1851	4	—
1861	8	+100.0%
1871	0	−100.0%
1881	0	0.00%
1891	0	0.00%
1901	0	0.00%
1911	0	0.00%

Year	Pop.	±%
1926	0	0.00%
1936	2	—
1946	2	+0.0%
1951	3	+50.0%
1956	2	−33.3%
1961	0	−100.0%
1966	0	0.00%
1971	0	0.00%

Year	Pop.	±%
1979	0	0.00%
1981	0	0.00%
1986	0	0.00%
1991	0	0.00%
1996	0	0.00%
2002	0	0.00%
2006	0	0.00%

Source: Central Statistics Office. "CNA17: Population by Off Shore Island, Sex and Year". CSO.ie.
