= Caleb Grimshaw =

1848 sailing vessel, sank 1849

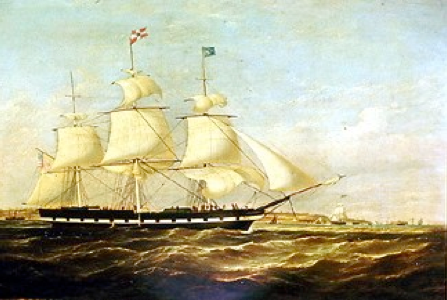
- The Caleb Grimshaw, by Samuel Walters

History

United Kingdom
- Name: Caleb Grimshaw
- Namesake: Caleb Grimshaw
- Owner: Caleb Grimshaw and Co.
- Builder: William H. Webb
- Launched: 1848
- Out of service: 1849
- Fate: Caught fire on 11 November 1849, sank 21 November
- Notes: Service route Liverpool to New York City

General characteristics
- Class & type: Full-rigged ship
- Tons burthen: 988
- Length: 166 ft (51 m)
- Beam: 36 ft 8 in (11.18 m)
- Draught: 21 ft 8 in (6.60 m)

Caleb Grimshaw was a sailing vessel built in 1848 for the Atlantic packet trade. The ship caught fire and sank in 1849, with the death of 90-101 people.

== Construction ==
The Caleb Grimshaw was built in early 1848 for Liverpool-based Caleb Grimshaw and Co. at William H. Webb's New York City shipyard as a full-rigged sailing ship. She was 166 feet (51 m) by 36 feet 8 inches (11.18 m) by 21 feet 8 inches (6.60 m) with a tonnage of 988. Caleb Grimshaw and Co. specialized in the packet trade, coordinating the transportation of cargo and emigration traffic across the Atlantic. The ship was presumed to be named after Caleb Grimshaw posthumously as he had died unexpectedly in early 1847. Under Captain William Hoxie, she sailed from Liverpool to New York City with a maximum of 427 passengers, mostly emigrants from England and Ireland. The Caleb Grimshaw made five successful crossings of the Atlantic between May 1848 and August 1849.

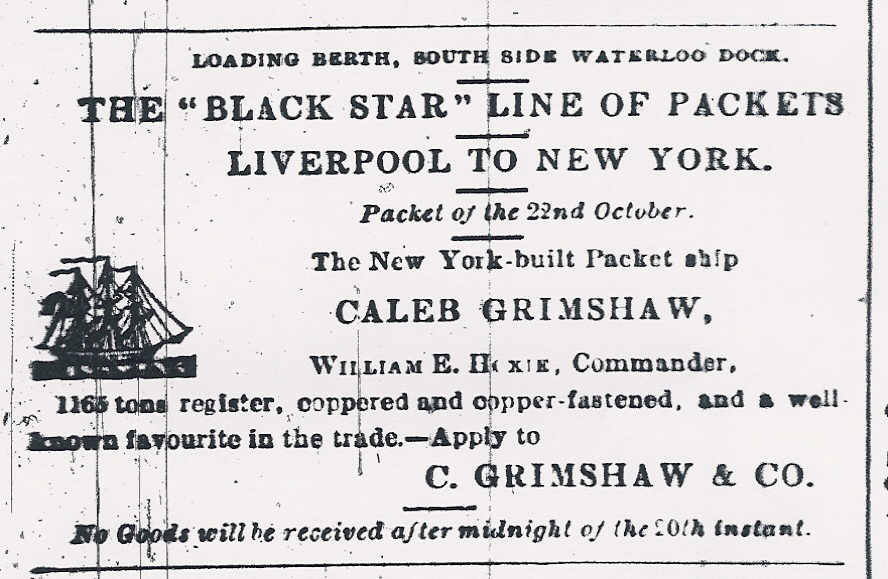
Sailing notice for the Caleb Grimshaw to New York. Liverpool Mercury, 1849

== Fire ==
On her sixth voyage, while carrying 100 tons of coal as well as 427 passengers, the ship caught fire on 11 November 1849 in the Atlantic Ocean 16 nautical miles (30 km; 18 mi) south east of Faial Island, Azores. There were four boats on board the Caleb Grimshaw, but the first was lowered by inexperienced passengers and crashed into the water, resulting in 12 passengers being swept away. Captain Hoxie boarded the third boat to be deployed, on 12 November, leaving the remaining passengers and crew without leadership. As there was insufficient space on the boats for all 457 passengers and crew, several rafts were assembled but more than 250 passengers were still on board the burning hull when the barque Sarah (United Kingdom), arrived on the scene four days later. Sarah made multiple trips to rescue the stranded but many passengers remained on board when the ship finally sank on 21 November. News sources reported 90 to 101 dead.

== Aftermath ==
At least one news article would emphasize the lack of appropriate lifeboats and safety gear as well as the risks of carrying a flammable payload with passengers. While generally criticized by newspaper editorials for abandoning the ship, Captain Hoxie did not receive any official punishment. In 1851, Captain Hoxie was appointed commander of another packet ship, the Joseph Walker, which would burn and sink in 1853 along with the Great Republic.
