= HMS Daring (1844) =

Brig of the Royal Navy

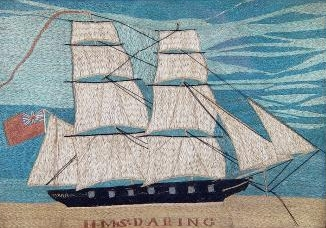
- A sailor's woolwork picture of Daring

History

United Kingdom
- Name: HMS Daring
- Ordered: 10 July 1843
- Builder: Portsmouth Dockyard
- Cost: £8,036 (plus £4,992 for fitting)
- Laid down: October 1843
- Launched: 2 April 1844
- Commissioned: 22 October 1844
- Fate: Sold 7 October 1864

General characteristics
- Tons burthen: 425 59/94 bm
- Length: 104 ft (32 m)
- Beam: 31 ft 4 in (9.55 m)
- Depth of hold: 15 ft 2 in (4.62 m)
- Sail plan: Brig-rigged
- Complement: 130
- Armament: 12 guns: 2 × 32-pounder (39cwt) guns; 10 × 32pounder (25cwt) guns

HMS Daring was a 12 gun-brig of the Royal Navy which became part of the Experimental Squadrons of both 1844 and 1845, and later served in the West Indies. She was sold in 1864.

== Construction ==
Daring was designed by Mr. Thomas White of Cowes and built in Portsmouth Dockyard. She was launched (Note: Technically, since she was built in a dry dock, she was "undocked" rather than launched.) on 2 April 1844 and commissioned on 22 October the same year.

== History ==
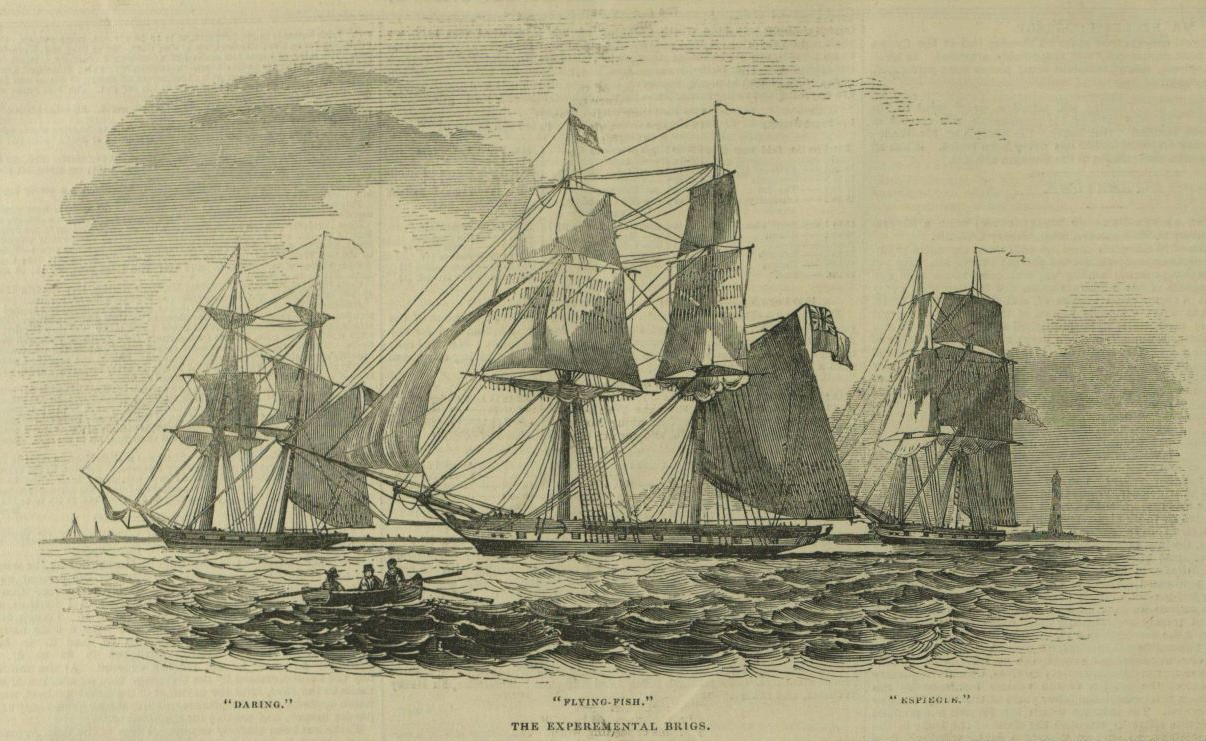
The Experimental Brigs, Daring, Flying Fish, and Espiegle on 4 March 1845

=== The Experimental Squadron of 1844 ===
From September 1844 until February 1847, she was commanded by Commander Henry James Matson, an outspoken abolitionist and hero of the Preventative Squadron. She was employed on the Home Station, where she formed part of the 1844 Experimental Brig Squadron. The Times stated:

We stated last week that the Daring entered her complement, and could have entered many more on the day she hoisted her pendant. This has been seized upon (as we expected it would be), as corroboratory of the statements made in certain daily and weekly "sources of information" upon the present efficient state of our naval force. It is, in fact, however, corroborative of no such allegation, but merely proves this, that the Daring and Waterwitch, being the first of the squadron commissioned, had a rush made to enter for them, and the former having a very excellent commander and a very "winning" look, was manned, and to spare, before her sister had half her complement on her books, and before the other vessel of the squadron had entered a single hand.

— The Times, 23 September 1844

She appeared to be a good sailer; the report of the comparative sailing qualities of the vessels making up the Experimental Brig Squadron reads:

In the trial No. l, with the water smooth and a long swell, the Flying Fish had the greatest advantage; the Osprey and Daring slightly differing from each other, coming next; but in the trial No. 7, when the wind was similar, but where instead of smooth water there was a cross head sea, the Daring was the most weatherly, the Flying Fish and Espiegle coming after her, being followed, but at some distance, by the Mutine and Osprey. From the results of these two trials with the same weather, but with the sea coming in a different direction, it may safely be deduced that the Daring with a head sea is the superior vessel; and this is really remarkably confirmed by examining the details of the trial No. 7, where it appears that for three hours, when on the tack, with a following sea, there was comparatively but little difference between the Flying Fish, Espiegle, and Daring; but that afterwards, when the signal to tack had been made, and they were brought to bow the sea, the advantage was chiefly gained, which in two hours gave the Daring so great a superiority over the other two.

— Captain Corry RN, To the Secretary of the Admiralty, 9 December 1844

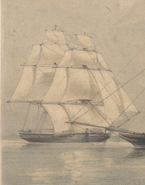
Daring in 1848

=== The Experimental Squadron of 1845 ===
Daring joined the two-deckers Albion, Vanguard, Superb, Rodney and Canopus on the third cruise of the 1845 Experimental Squadron, the only brig to do so. They were joined on 21 October by the wooden steam sloop HMS Rattler. The Times reported that Daring could often not keep up with the larger ships:

The Daring brig, 12, is, from her small tonnage and canvass, always left behind, except when on a wind under storm stay sails, in which case she drifts less, and is consequently ahead.

— The Times, London, 13 October 1845

=== Service on the North America and West Indies Station ===
From 1846 Daring served on the North America and West Indies Station. On 10 June 1846 she captured the Spanish slave schooners Rauret and Numa off Guano Point. The Mixed Court of Justice at the Havana found in favour of the owners and sentenced the ships to be restored to their masters on 15 July 1846.

=== The Wreck of USS Somers ===
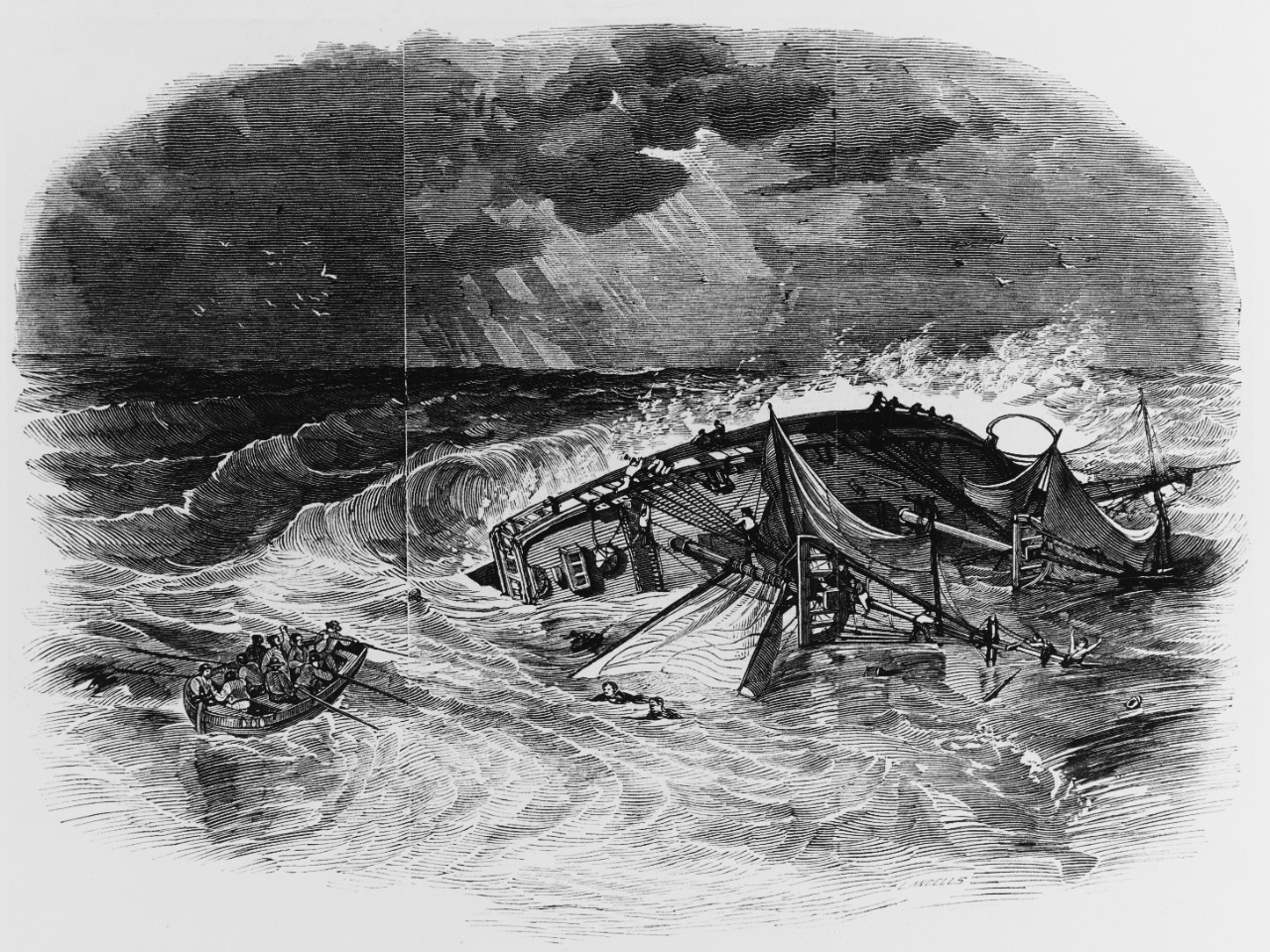
Loss of USS Somers off Vera Cruz

The United States government awarded medals to thirty-nine officers and crew of Daring, Endymion and Alarm in recognition of saving several officers and crew of the United States brig Somers in the harbour of Vera Cruz on 10 December 1846.

Daring apparently served the rest of her career on the North America and West Indies Station, returning to Britain at the end of each commission. Commander William Peel (a later winner of the VC and 3rd son of Sir Robert Peel, British Prime Minister) became her captain from February 1847 until October 1848. She refitted at Chatham in 1850 and from August 1852 was commanded by Commander Gerard John Napier. A memorial Inscription in the Port Royal Parish Church records that Lieutenant Smith, Midshipman Trevillian and 5 seamen of Daring were "drowned on June 23rd, 1853,- by the upsetting of one of her boats, - in the crossing of Tampico." She visited the Turks and Caicos Islands in 1855, and is recorded on a 20c stamp issued by the islands in August 1973.

=== Disposal ===
She was sold out of the service to Castle and Beech on 7 October 1864 and broken up at Charlton in March 1865. Her figurehead, a contemporary sailor staring straight ahead, is on display at the National Maritime Museum, Greenwich.

== Commanding officers ==
From	To	Captain
7 September 1844	11 February 1847	Commander Henry James Matson
11 February 1847	2 October 1848	Commander William Peel
30 August 1852		Commander Gerard John Napier
