= Experimental Squadron (Royal Navy) =

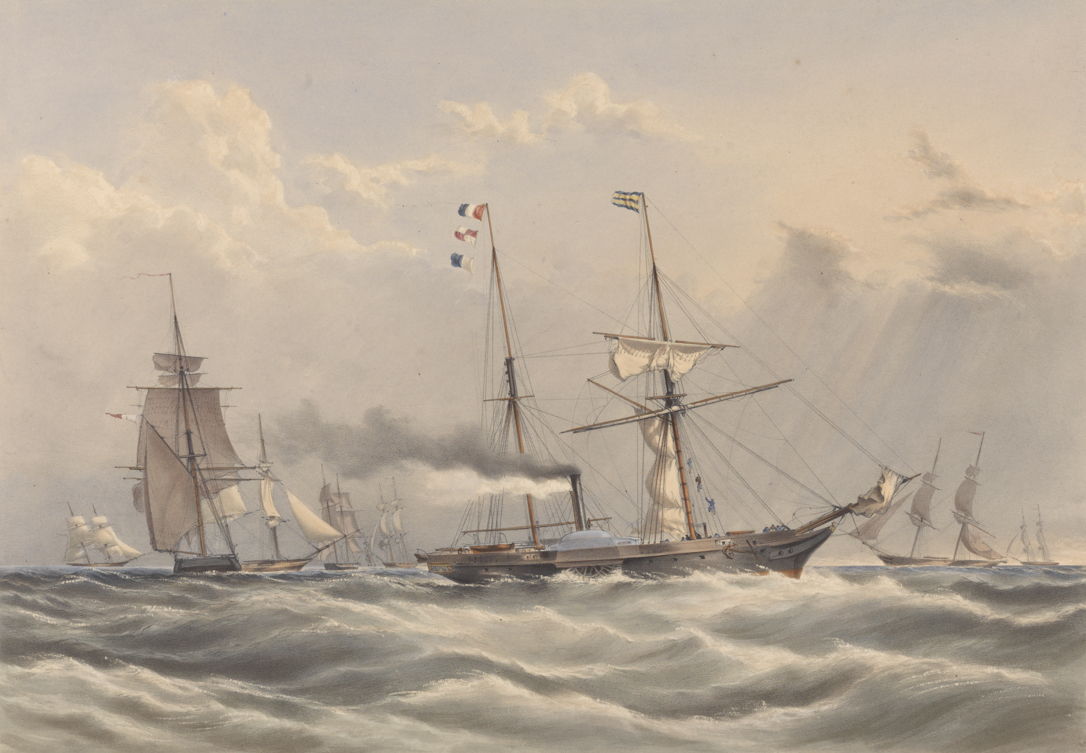
The steam frigate 'Firebrand' part of the Experimental Squadron

The Experimental Squadrons also known as Evolutionary Squadrons of the Royal Navy were groups of ships sent out in the 1830s and 1840s to test new techniques of ship design, armament, building and propulsion against old ones. They came about as a result of conflict between the "empirical" school of shipbuilding (led by William Symonds, Surveyor of the Navy), the "scientific" school led by the first School of Naval Architecture (closed in 1832), and the "traditional" school led by master shipwrights from the royal dockyards.

== 1831–1832 ==
Admiral Edward Codrington formed a "Squadron of Evolution" for conducting trials on new hull forms. The squadron was formed in 1831 as part of a strategy to sit off the Belgian coast and to encourage a French withdrawal. The French were there to support the Belgians against the Dutch. Later on the ships had to reinforce a British squadron operating in the Tagus, off Lisbon as constitutionalists and absolutist factions waged a civil war ashore.

== 1832 ==
The Experimental Squadron under command of Sir Pulteney Malcolm held trials in July 1832 off the Irish coast, and again on 14 August off the Scilly Islands.

The trial of 13 July was between HM cutter Emerald (tender to the Victory) and the Paddy from Cork. The Paddy recently lengthened to 99 tons, winning by twelve minutes or nearly one mile.

== 1844 ==
Determined to prove William Symonds' designs to be failures, the new Tory Board of Admiralty sent out successive "Experimental Squadrons" in the mid-1840s. In 1844, a brig squadron (including Symonds' Pantaloon and Flying Fish, the old Cruiser, and ships by other designers) left Portsmouth on 22 October, followed three days later by a ship of the line squadron under Rear-admiral William Bowles (with the old three-deckers Caledonia and St Vincent and Symonds' three-decker Queen). The ships of the line were joined at Lisbon on 3 November by Symonds' two-decker Albion, and all four arrived back in Portsmouth on 27 November, 9 days before the brig squadron.

== 1845 ==
On 15 July the following year, the elderly Rear-Admiral Hyde Parker led the pre-Symonds Trafalgar, St Vincent, Rodney and Canopus, along with Symonds' Queen, Albion, Vanguard and Superb, out of Portsmouth Harbour. The squadron arrived at Cork on 7 September, left on the 18th, and arrived in Plymouth on the 20th. (In this and all the other 1845 squadrons Queen performed well, having performed badly in the 1844 squadron.) In Plymouth, the same squadron was transferred to Rear-Admiral Sir Samuel Pym and sailed on 21 October, returning to the same port on 3 December. The third and final 1845 cruise lasted 43 days and consisted solely of the two deckers from the previous two (Albion, Vanguard, Superb, Rodney and Canopus), accompanied by a brig from the 1844 squadron, Daring. It sailed from Plymouth on 21 October, led, not by an admiral (those then available were all very old and infirm, and the Admiralty placed little confidence in them), but by successive captains in the squadron acting as commodore (Moresby in Canopus, and then Willes in Vanguard).

== 1846 ==
A final set of cruises occurred in April to July 1846 starting at Cobh under Commodore Sir Francis Collier in the Napoleonic-era HMS St Vincent, with a "squadron of evolution" made up of sailing ships of the line and steam-ships, including: HMS Trafalgar, HMS Queen, HMS Rodney, HMS Albion, HMS Superb, HMS Raleigh, HMS Vanguard, HMS Belleisle, and HMS Brilliant. Paddle steamers: HMS Retribution, HMS Gladiator, HMS Scourge, HMS Devastation, HMS Cyclops, and HMS Rattler (the Navy's first screw propeller ship.

== Results ==
Outside factors in the 1840s tests, such as individual captains' political bias or stowage's influence on how well a ship sailed, were underappreciated and so in October 1847 - in the face of the Board's institution of a "Committee of Reference" the previous year to oversee him and modify his designs according to the Board's wishes - Symonds resigned his role.

== Commanders ==
Rank	Name	Date
Vice-Admiral	Sir Edward Codrington	1831
Vice-Admiral	Sir Pulteney Malcolm	1832
Captain	Armar Lowry Corry	1844
Rear-Admiral	Hyde Parker	1845
Rear-Admiral	Sir Samuel Pym	1845
Commodore	Fairfax Moresby	1845
Commodore	George Willes	1845
Commodore	Francis Collier	1846

== Sources ==
- Experimental Squadrons at the William Loney website
