= Paddle wheel =

Form of waterwheel or impeller

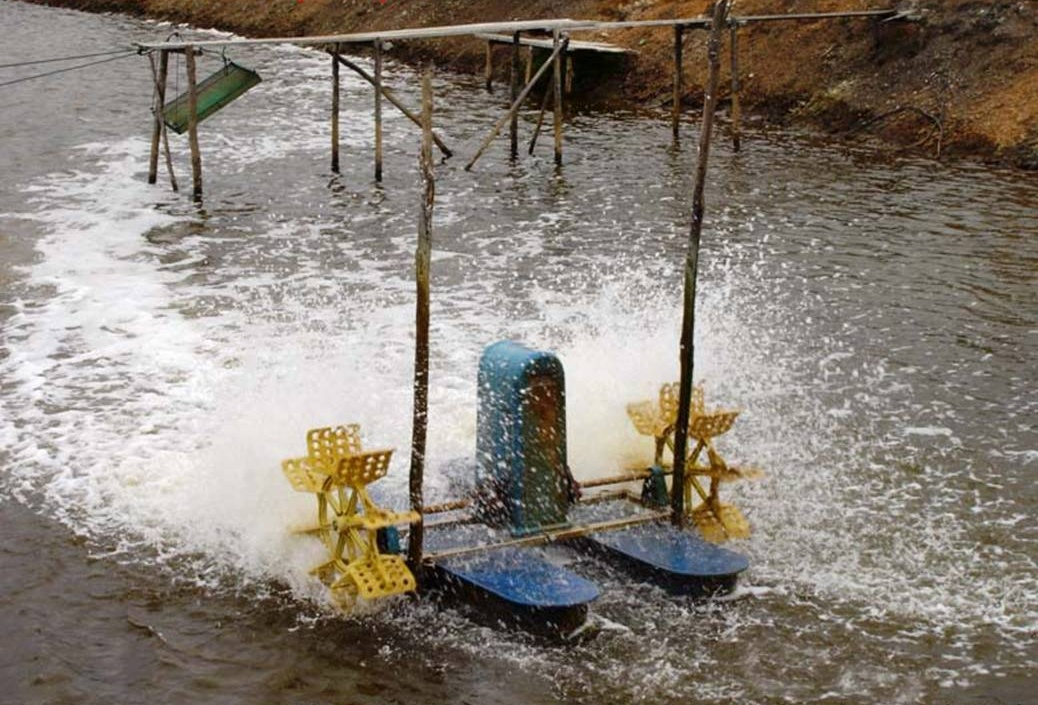
A paddle wheel aereator used in an Indonesian shrimp pond

A paddle wheel is a form of waterwheel or impeller in which a number of paddles are set around the periphery of the wheel. It has several uses, of which some are:

- Very low-lift water pumping, such as flooding paddy fields at no more than about 0.5 m (20 in) height above the water source.
- To move and mix algae culture in the raceway ponds used for algaculture.
- Propulsion of watercraft (as a paddlewheel)
- Low head hydro power (as a waterwheel)
- Flow sensors
- Aerators

The paddle wheel is an ancient invention but is still used today in a wide range of industrial and agriculture applications.

== Ship propulsion ==
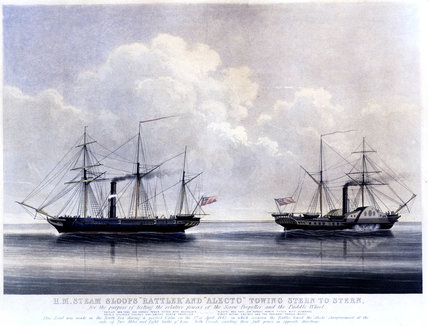
Contemporary lithograph of the competition between the propeller-driven Rattler (left) and paddle-driven Alecto (right) in 1845

Paddle wheels would enable ships to travel without needing wind or oars. They were made obsolete by propellers, which had greater propulsion with lower weight and fuel usage. This was demonstrated by an 1845 tug-of-war competition between HMS Rattler and HMS Alecto with the screw-driven Rattler pulling the paddle steamer Alecto backward at 2.5 knots (4.6 km/h).

== Physics ==
The paddle wheel is a device for converting between rotary motion of a shaft and linear motion of a fluid. In the linear-to-rotary direction, it is placed in a fluid stream to convert the linear motion of the fluid into rotation of the wheel. Such a rotation can be used as a source of power, or as an indication of the speed of flow. In the rotary-to-linear direction, it is driven by a prime mover such as an electric motor or steam engine and used to pump a fluid or propel a vehicle such as a paddle-wheel steamer or a steamship.
