= HMS Basilisk (1848) =

Sloop of the Royal Navy

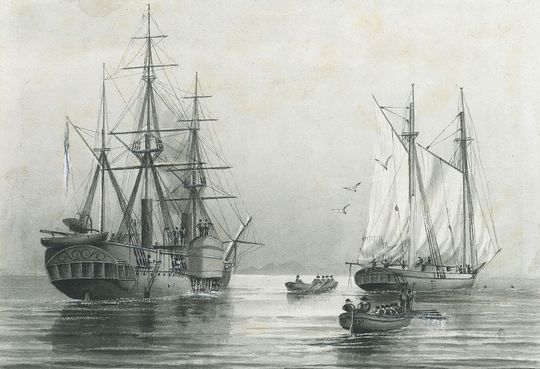
- Basilisk (left) and the merchantman Queen Anne (right)

History

United Kingdom
- Name: HMS Basilisk
- Ordered: 26 March 1846
- Builder: Woolwich Dockyard
- Cost: £54,745 (Note: A total cost accounting for inflation of approximately £5,634,000 in today's money.)
- Laid down: November 1846
- Launched: 22 August 1848
- Commissioned: July 1852
- Fate: Broken up at Chatham in 1882

General characteristics
- Type: First-class paddle sloop
- Displacement: 1,710 tons
- Tons burthen: Designed: 1,00124/94 bm; As built: 1,031 bm (Note: She was built 5 inches greater in the beam than designed.)
- Length: 190 ft 0 in (57.9 m) (gundeck); 166 ft 1 in (50.6 m) (keel)
- Beam: 34 ft 0 in (10.4 m)
- Depth of hold: 21 ft 6 in (6.6 m)
- Installed power: 400 nominal horsepower; 1,033 ihp (770 kW)
- Propulsion: 2-cylinder oscillating steam engine; Paddle wheels
- Sail plan: Barque
- Complement: 145
- Armament: 1 × 68-pounder (95 cwt) pivot gun; 1 × 10-inch (84 cwt) gun; 4 × 32-pounder (42 cwt) guns

HMS Basilisk was a first-class paddle sloop of the Royal Navy, built at the Woolwich Dockyard and launched on 22 August 1848.

== Design and construction ==
Basilisk was designed by Oliver Lang to the same lines as the screw sloop Niger and ordered on 23 March 1846 from Woolwich Dockyard. She was laid down in November of the same year and launched on 22 August 1848.

=== Propulsion ===
She was fitted with paddlewheels driven by a Miller, Ravenhill & Salkeld two-cylinder oscillating steam engine rated at 400 nominal horsepower and developing 1,033 indicated horsepower (770 kW).

=== Armament ===
Basilisk was fitted with a single 68-pounder (95 cwt) smoothbore muzzle-loading gun on a pivot mount, a single 10-inch (84 cwt) shell gun and four 32-pounder (42 cwt) smoothbore muzzle-loading guns on truck mountings.

== Propulsion trials ==
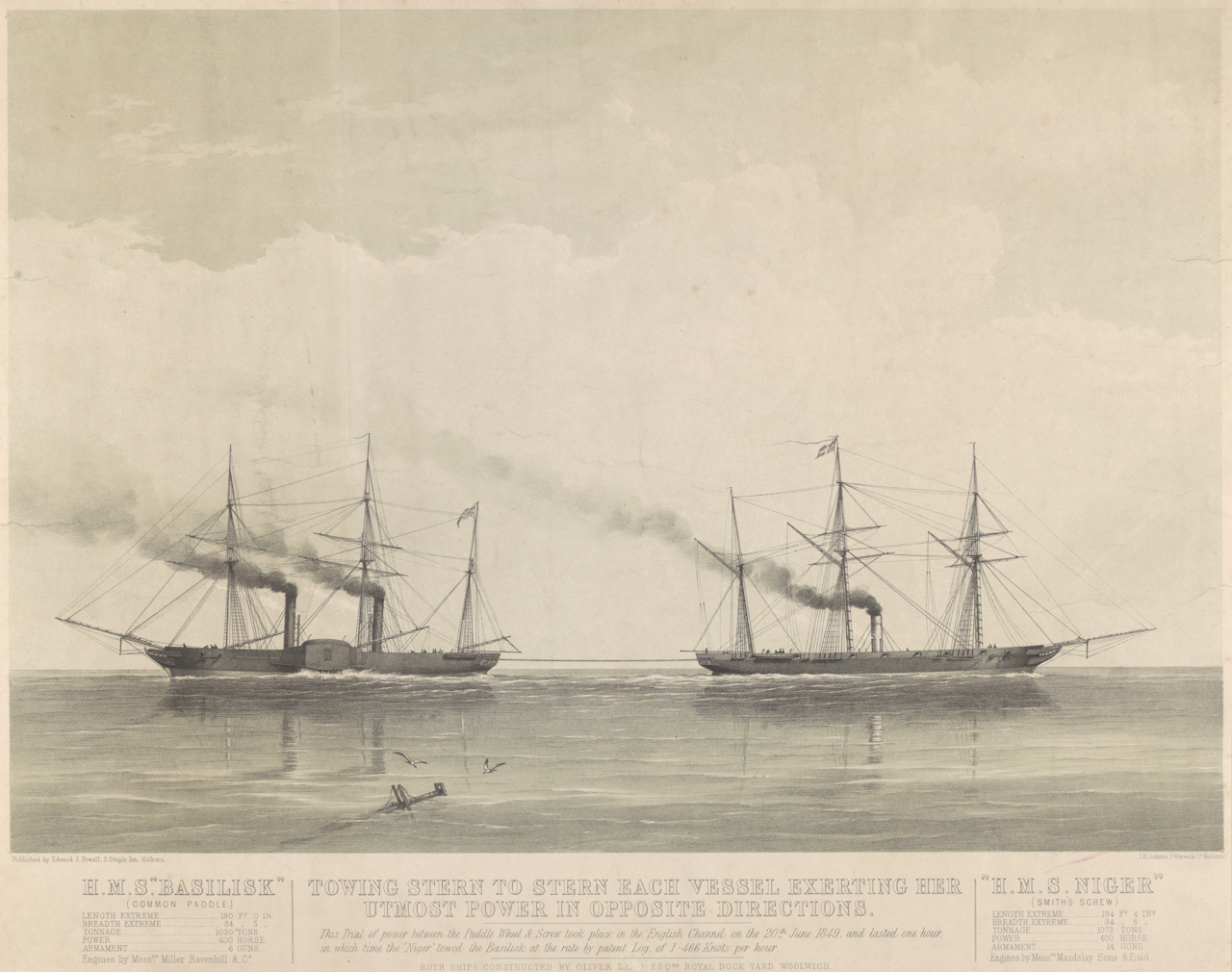
Basilisk, paddle sloop, towing stern-to-stern with Niger, screw sloop

She participated in 1849 in trials in the English Channel with the screw sloop Niger. Basilisk had started life as her sister ship when both were designed as sailing sloops, but while Niger received screw propulsion, Basilisk was fitted with paddles. Although previous trials, including a similar comparison between Rattler and Alecto in 1845, had shown that screw propulsion was broadly superior, the 1849 trials pitted two near-identical ships against each other. Since both ships had the same lines and steam engines developing almost identical power, the results confirmed the superiority of screw propulsion over the paddle-wheel once and for all. On 7 April 1853, Basilisk ran aground off Southsea, Hampshire due to a flag being hoisted showing it was safe to enter Portsmouth Naval Base when there was insufficient water to do so. Two or three of her crew were injured. She was later refloated and taken in to Portsmouth.

== Crimean War service ==
After the trials she served in the Baltic Sea during the Crimean War in 1854–1855, participating in the blockade of Courland. She attacked and sank 10 Russian transports carrying grain on 14 June 1855 and sank some salt boats on 13 July. She also participated in the action of 17 July in the Gulf of Riga, with HMS Desperate against Russian gunboats and shore batteries.

== Foreign service ==
After the Crimean War, she served on the North America and West Indies Station and afterwards on the China Station and in Japan. On 27 July 1868, she was driven ashore on the coast of China. Repairs cost £1,777.

In March 1871 she commenced service on the Australia Station under Captain John Moresby. She undertook hydrographic surveys around New Guinea with Captain Moresby. During the survey of the southern coast he discovered the harbour which he named Fairfax after his father. The town established there, based on already existing native villages (principally Hanuabada) was named Port Moresby and is now the nation's capital.

She was later used for anti-blackbirding operations in the South Pacific. She visited the Ellice Islands in July 1872.

She left the Australia Station in 1874 and returned to England.

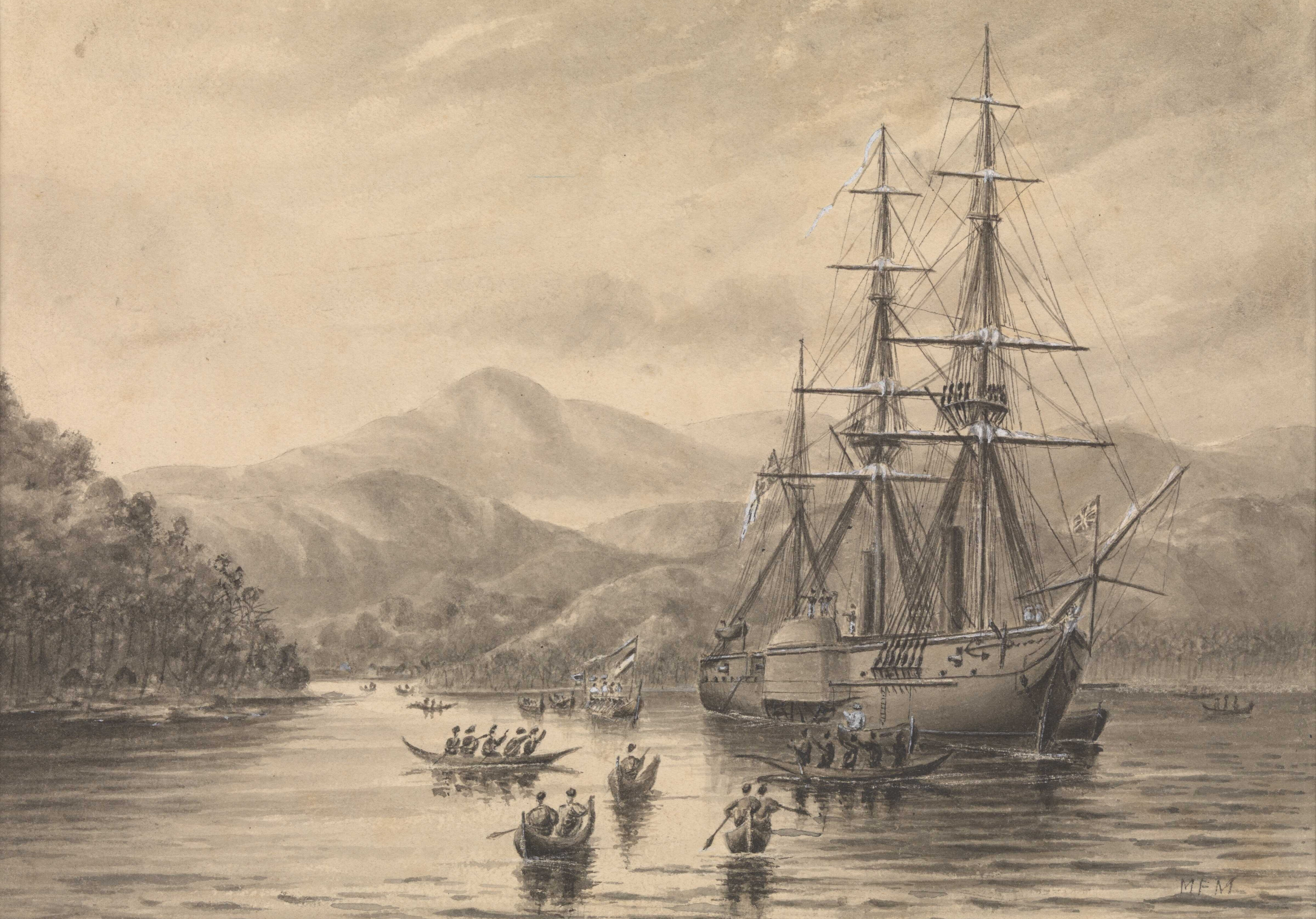
HMS 'Basilisk', anchored in Threshold Bay, New Guinea, 28 May 1874

== Fate ==
Basilisk was paid off and broken up at Chatham in 1882.
