= George Willes =

Royal Navy Admiral (1823-1901)

Admiral Sir George Willes GCB
- Born: 19 June 1823
- Died: 18 February 1901 (aged 77); London
- Military career
- Allegiance: United Kingdom
- Branch: Royal Navy
- Service years: 1838–1888
- Rank: Admiral
- Commands: HMS Chesapeake; HMS Impérieuse; HMS Prince Consort; China Station; Portsmouth Command
- Conflicts: Crimean War; Second Opium War
- Awards: Knight Grand Cross of the Order of the Bath

Admiral Sir George Ommanney Willes GCB (19 June 1823 – 18 February 1901) was a Royal Navy officer who went on to be Commander-in-Chief, Portsmouth.

== Early life ==
Born at Hythe, Hampshire in 1823, Willes was the son of Captain George Wickens Willes, RN, by his wife Anne Lacon, daughter of Sir Edmund Lacon, Baronet. He was educated at the Royal Naval College, Portsmouth, and joined the Royal Navy in 1838.

== Naval career ==
Willes received his commission as Mate in 1842, and as Lieutenant in 1844, his early career being uneventful until the outbreak of the Crimean War, when he took part in the bombardments of Odessa and of Sevastopol's Konstantin Battery in 1854. In April that year he was promoted Commander, and in May 1856 Captain. He was given command of the frigate HMS Chesapeake in 1859, and of HMS Impérieuse in 1861. In both cases as Flag Captain to the Commander-in-Chief, East Indies. In this capacity he took part in the Battle of the Taku Forts during the Second Opium War.

In 1864 he was made Captain of the ironclad warship HMS Prince Consort. He was promoted to rear admiral on 11 June 1874.

He became Admiral-Superintendent at Devonport in 1876 and Commander-in-chief, China Station in 1881. His last post was as Commander-in-Chief, Portsmouth in 1886. He retired in 1888.

== Family ==
In 1855 he married Georgiana Matilda Josephine, daughter of William Joseph Lockwood and granddaughter of Sir Mark Wood, 1st Baronet. His younger brother was the cricketer Edmund Willes.

== See also ==
- O'Byrne, William Richard (1849). "Willes, George Ommanney" . A Naval Biographical Dictionary . John Murray – via Wikisource.

Military offices
Preceded by Robert Coote	Commander-in-Chief, China Station; 1881–1884	Succeeded by Sir William Dowell
Preceded by Sir Geoffrey Hornby	Commander-in-Chief, Portsmouth; 1886–1888	Succeeded by Sir John Commerell
