= Edmund Willes =

English cricketer and cleric

Personal information
- Full name: Edmund Henry Lacon Willes
- Born: 7 July 1832; Dibden Purlieu, Hampshire, England
- Died: 9 September 1896 (aged 64); Monk Sherborne, Hampshire, England
- Batting: Right-handed
- Bowling: Right-arm roundarm fast
- Relatives: George Willes (cousin)

Domestic team information
- Years: Team
- 1850: Hampshire (pre-county club)
- 1851–1854: Oxford University
- 1852–1853: Kent
- 1865: Hampshire
- 1866–1867: MCC

Career statistics
| Competition | First-class |
|---|---|
| Matches | 22 |
| Runs scored | 416 |
| Batting average | 13.86 |
| 100s/50s | 0/1 |
| Top score | 69 |
| Balls bowled | 164 |
| Wickets | 20 |
| Bowling average | ? |
| 5 wickets in innings | 0 |
| 10 wickets in match | 0 |
| Best bowling | 4/? |
| Catches/stumpings | 12/– |
- Source: Cricinfo, 12 February 2010

Edmund Henry Lacon Willes JP (7 July 1832 — 9 September 1896) was an English first-class cricketer, educator and clergyman.

The third surviving son of George Wickens Willes, a captain in the Royal Navy, by his wife Anne Elizabeth, daughter of Sir Edmund Lacon, 1st Baronet, Willes was born in July 1832 at Dibden Purlieu, Hampshire. His elder brother was Admiral George Ommanney Willes, later to become Royal Navy Commander-in-Chief, Portsmouth. He was educated at Winchester College, where he played for the college cricket team. From there, he matriculated to the University of Oxford, studying firstly at Wadham College, before proceeding to The Queen's College as an exhibitioner. In the same year as his matriculation to Wadham College, Willes made his debut in first-class cricket for a representative Hampshire team against an All England Eleven at Southampton. While studying at Oxford, Willes was a member of the Oxford University Cricket Club, for whom he would also play first-class cricket for. From his debut for Oxford in 1851 against the Marylebone Cricket Club (MCC), he would go onto make ten first-class appearances for the university to 1854, which included three appearances in The University Match at Lord's and two seasons as captain. His ten matches for the university, he scored 184 runs at an average of 15.33. It was for the Gentlemen of Kent that he would record his highest first-class score of 69, which was to be his only half century. Alongside playing for Oxford during his studies, Willes also played first-class cricket for Kent on two occasions in 1852 and 1853, and for the Gentlemen of Kent from 1851 to 1854. Whilst studying for his master's, he played two first-class matches in 1855 for a combined Surrey and Kent cricket team against England, and for the Gentlemen of Kent and Surrey against the Gentlemen of England.

After graduating from Oxford, Willes took holy orders in the Church of England and was appointed in 1856 to his first ecclesiastical post as curate at Swinbrook, Oxfordshire. In the same year he was appointed a fellow of Queen's College, a fellowship he would maintain until 1865. In 1857, he became curate at King's Sutton, Northamptonshire. In 1860, he became a college tutor at Winchester College and three years later he became rector of St Swithun's Church in Winchester. While engaged at Winchester College, Willes made one first-class appearance for the nascent Hampshire County Cricket Club in 1865, against Middlesex. He would make two further first-class appearances, both for the MCC at Lord's in 1866 and 1867. His overall appearances in first-class cricket amounted to 22, in which he scored 416 runs at an average of 13.86; with his right-arm roundarm fast bowling, he took 20 wickets. His ecclesiastical duties took him to Cornwall in 1865, with Willes spending a year as vicar at Helston. From there, he proceeded to Ashby Magna in Leicestershire to become rector there in 1866. He would maintain the rectorship at Ashby Magna until 1887, having been appointed an honorary canon of Peterborough Cathedral in 1871. Willes returned to Hampshire in 1887, upon being appointed rector at Monk Sherborne. He remained rector there until his death in September 1896, following a short illness. He had also been a justice of the peace in his latter years. He had been married to Helena Mitchell Willes since 1862; she was married to George Willes (1815–1862) until his death. His cousin, George Willes (distinct from his wife's deceased husband), was also a first-class cricketer.
