= Hyde Parker (Royal Navy officer, born 1784) =

Vice-Admiral Hyde Parker CB
- Born: 1784
- Died: 26 May 1854 (aged 69–70) Ham, Surrey
- Allegiance: United Kingdom
- Branch: Royal Navy
- Service years: 1796–1854
- Rank: Vice-Admiral
- Commands: HMS Monmouth; HMS Tenedos; HMS Iphigenia; HMS St Vincent; HMS Victory; HMS Rodney
- Conflicts: Napoleonic Wars; War of 1812
- Awards: Companion of the Order of the Bath

Vice-Admiral Hyde Parker CB (1784 – 26 May 1854), sometimes referred to as Hyde Parker III, was a Royal Navy officer. As a junior officer he took part in the capture of the Cape of Good Hope in January 1806 during the Napoleonic Wars. He also commanded the naval forces at the siege of Machias in September 1814 and took the surrender of the frigate USS President in January 1815 during the War of 1812. He became First Naval Lord in February 1852 and in that capacity he ensured that all new warships being procured were propelled by steam and he also increased the size of the active fleet.

== Early career ==
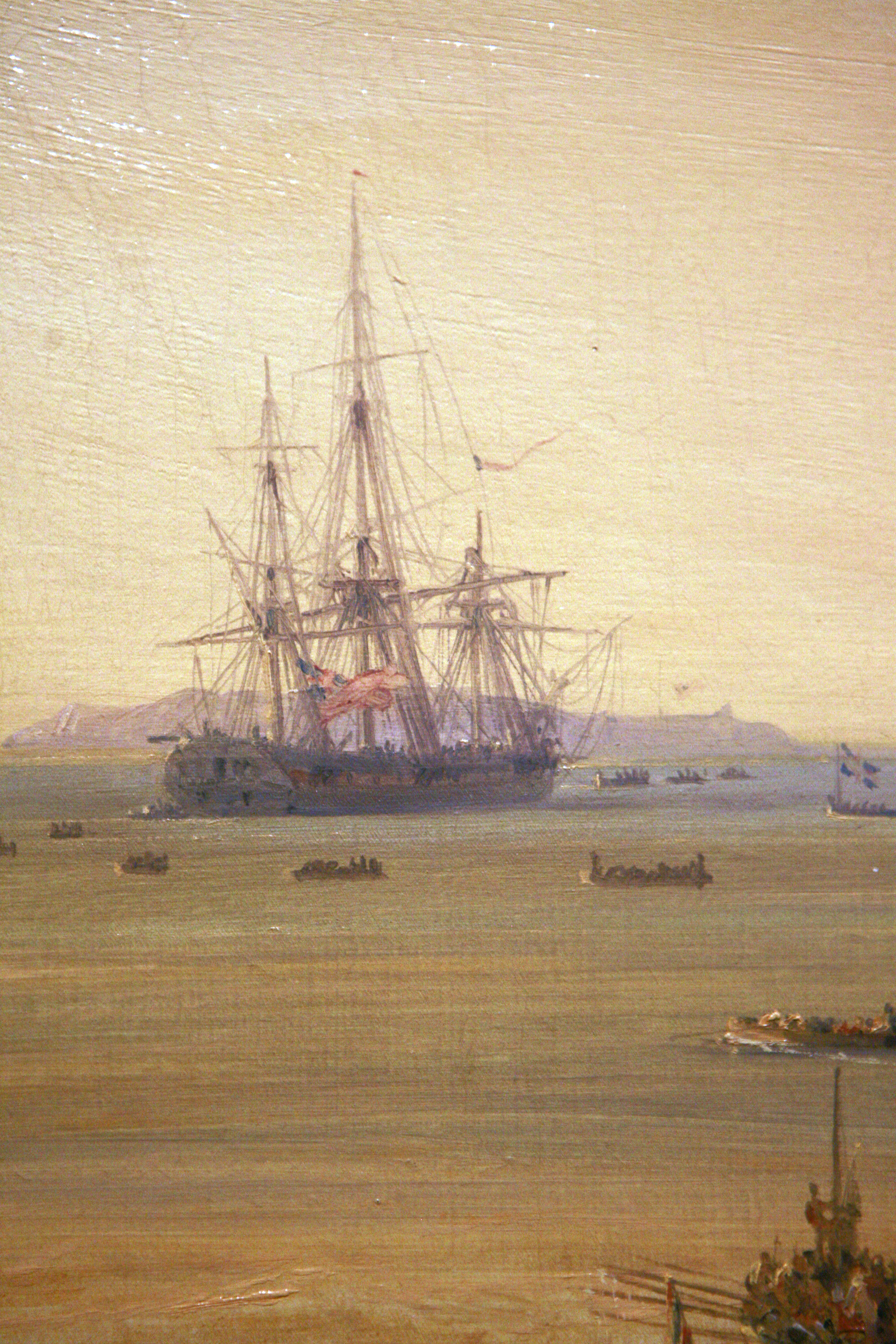
The fifth-rate HMS Iphigenia, a ship Parker commanded on the North American Station

The second of three sons of Admiral Sir Hyde Parker and Anne Parker (née Boteler), Parker joined the Royal Navy in February 1796. After initial training at the Royal Naval Academy at Portsmouth he joined the fifth-rate HMS Cambrian. He transferred to the fifth-rate HMS Narcissus in 1801, and having been promoted to lieutenant on 24 September 1804, took part in the capture of the Cape of Good Hope in January 1806 during the Napoleonic Wars. He transferred to the frigate HMS Volontaire later that year and, having been promoted to commander on 22 January 1806, took command of the sloop HMS Prometheus in March 1807 for the Copenhagen expedition.

Promoted to captain on 13 October 1807, Parker was given command of the third-rate HMS Monmouth in the Downs in March 1811 and the fifth-rate HMS Tenedos on the North American Station in April 1812. On 3 April 1814, while cruising with HMS Junon, Tenedos chased the USS Constitution into Marblehead, Massachusetts. Parker was keen to follow her in but the senior officer Clotworthy Upton, ordered him to withdraw. Parker commanded the naval forces at the siege of Machias in September 1814 and took the surrender of the frigate USS President in January 1815 during the War of 1812.

Parker took command of the fifth-rate HMS Iphigenia also on the North American Station in March 1818 and then the first-rate HMS St Vincent, flagship of the Commander-in-Chief, Portsmouth, in May 1830. Having been appointed an extra aide-de-camp to the King on 5 September 1831, he took command of the first-rate HMS Victory also at Portsmouth in December 1831 and then the second-rate HMS Rodney in the Mediterranean Fleet in August 1835. He was appointed a Companion of the Order of the Bath on 18 April 1839.

== Senior command ==
Promoted to rear-admiral on 23 November 1841, Parker went on to be Admiral Superintendent of Portsmouth Dockyard, hoisting his flag in HMS Victory, in August 1842 and Commander of the Experimental Squadron in July 1845.

Parker became First Naval Lord in the First Derby ministry in February 1852 but continued in office when the Aberdeen ministry came to power in December 1852 having impressed the incoming Government with his non-political style of leadership. As First Naval Lord, Parker he ensured that all new warships being procured were propelled by steam and he also increased the size of the active fleet. Promoted to vice-admiral on 4 June 1852, he died while still in office at his home in Ham in Surrey on 25 May 1854 and is buried at St Andrew's Church, Ham along with his wife and son.

== Family ==
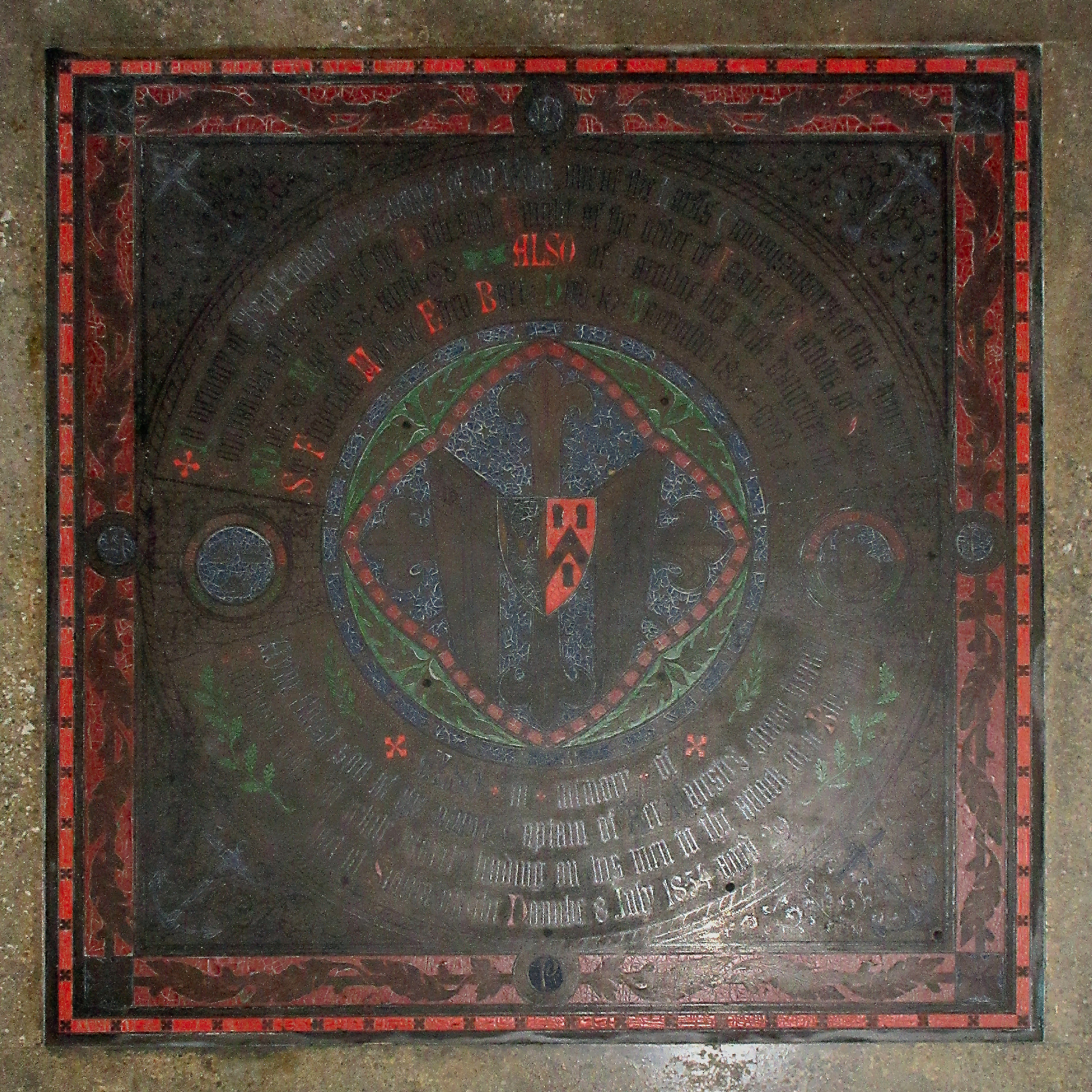
Memorial in St Andrew's Church, Ham

In 1821 he married Caroline Eden (1801–1854), daughter of Sir Frederick Eden, 2nd Baronet; they had several children. Their son, Hyde Parker, was a captain in the Black Sea during the Crimean War and was killed on 8 July 1854 when storming a Russian fort at Sulina.

== See also ==
- O'Byrne, William Richard (1849). "Parker, Hyde (a)" . A Naval Biographical Dictionary . John Murray – via Wikisource.

== Sources ==
- William Loney RN Career History

Military offices
| Preceded by Sir Maurice Berkeley | First Naval Lord; 1852–1854 | Succeeded by Sir Maurice Berkeley |
