= HMS Rodney (1833) =

Ship of the line of the Royal Navy

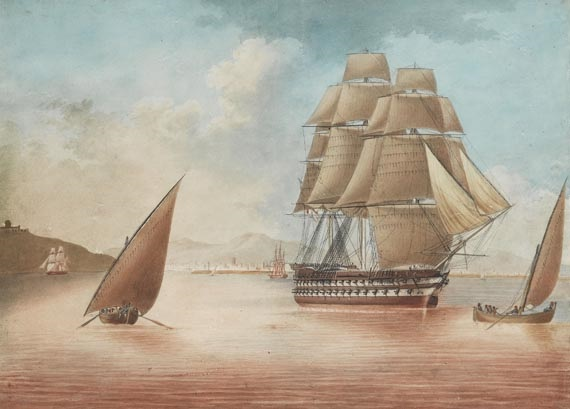
- Rodney leaving Barcelona 1837, by Nicolas S. Cammillieri

History

United Kingdom
- Name: Rodney
- Namesake: Admiral George Rodney
- Ordered: November 1826
- Builder: Pembroke Dockyard
- Laid down: July 1827
- Launched: 18 June 1833
- Completed: 7 December 1835
- Commissioned: 29 August 1835
- Fate: Broken up, February 1882

General characteristics (as built)
- Class & type: Rodney-class ship of the line
- Tons burthen: 2,625 69/94 (bm)
- Length: 205 ft 8 in (62.69 m) (gundeck)
- Beam: 54 ft 5 in (16.59 m)
- Depth of hold: 23 ft 1 in (7.04 m)
- Propulsion: Sails
- Sail plan: Full-rigged ship
- Complement: 820 men
- Armament: All muzzle-loading, smoothbore guns; Lower gun deck: 32 × 32 pdr guns, 2 × 8 in (203 mm) shell guns; Upper gun deck: 32 × 32 pdr guns, 2 × 8 in shell guns; Forecastle & Quarterdeck: 24 × 32 pdr guns

General characteristics (after conversion)
- Displacement: 3,126 long tons (3,176 t)
- Tons burthen: 2,736 (bm)
- Length: 214 ft 4 in (65.3 m) (gun deck)
- Beam: 54 ft (16.5 m)
- Depth of hold: 23 ft (7.0 m)
- Installed power: Boilers; 2,246 ihp (1,675 kW)
- Propulsion: 1 shaft; 1 single-expansion steam engine
- Speed: 11.5 knots (21.3 km/h; 13.2 mph)
- Complement: 850
- Armament: Lower gun deck: 14 × 32 pdr guns, 18 × 8 in shell guns; Upper gun deck: 28 × 32 pdr guns, 6 × 8 in shell guns; Forecastle & Quarterdeck: 24 × 32 pdr guns, 1 × 68 pdr gun

HMS Rodney was the lead ship of her class of 90-gun, second-rate ships of the line built for the Royal Navy (RN) during the 1830s. Completed in 1835 as a sailing ship, she spent most of her early career assigned to the Mediterranean Fleet where she played a minor role in the Oriental Crisis of 1840. The ship participated in the Crimean War of 1854–1856 with the Russian Empire, including the bombardment of Sevastopol in 1854. The ship spent extensive time in reserve, or "in ordinary" as the RN termed it, during her career. Rodney was converted to screw propulsion in 1859–1860. She served as a flagship on the China Station where she was used to intimidate Chinese officials after the Yangzhou riot in 1868 and helped to suppress piracy the following year.

The ship was the last wooden ship of the line to serve on active duty when she returned home in 1870. Rodney was broken up for scrap in 1882.

== Design and description ==
The Rodney-class ships were designed by Sir Robert Seppings, co-Surveyor of the Navy, in response to the American USS Ohio and the French 100-gun Hercule class. The ships were 205 feet 6 inches (62.6 m) at the gun deck and 170 feet 1 inch (51.8 m) at the keel. The Rodney class had a beam of 54 feet 5 inches (16.6 m), a depth of hold of 23 feet (7.0 m) and measured 2,625 69/94 tons burthen. Their crew numbered 720 in peacetime and 820 in wartime. The ships had the usual three-masted full-ship rig with a sail area of 28,102 square feet (2,610.8 m^{2}).

Captain Charles Napier called Rodney, "a fine warship, but it is not a very superior sailer". That is not supported by experience as the ship proved to be a steady gun platform with a slow roll and was able to make 11.4 knots (21.1 km/h; 13.1 mph) sailing large early during her first deployment to the Mediterranean. Minor modifications in the early 1840s that including raking her masts backwards subsequently reduced her performance. During comparative speed trials in 1845 against other ships of the line, including Canopus, Vanguard, and Albion, Rodney proved to be the fastest in a head sea, but performed less well under other conditions.

The muzzle-loading, smoothbore armament of the Rodney class initially consisted of thirty-two 32-pounder (63 cwt) guns (Note: "Cwt" is the abbreviation for hundredweight, 63 cwt referring to the weight of the gun.) and two 8-inch (203 mm) (50 cwt) shell guns on the lower gun deck and thirty-two 32-pounder (55 cwt) and two 8-inch (50 cwt) shell guns on the upper gun deck. Between their forecastle and quarterdeck, they carried twenty-four 32-pounder (42 cwt) guns. The ships were later rearmed with twenty-six 32-pounders (56 cwt) and six 8-inch shell guns on the lower gun deck and thirty 32-pounders (56 cwt) and six 8-inch shell guns on the upper deck. The number of guns on the forecastle and quarterdeck increased to twenty-six 32-pounders (42 cwt) guns.

=== Conversion ===
The conversion of Rodney was ordered on 5 February 1859 and began on 16 March during a naval arms race between France and Britain in screw-powered ships of the line. Slightly longer than her sisters at 214 feet 4 inches (65.33 m), she measured 2,736 tons burthen and displaced 3,126 long tons (3,176 t). Her crew increased to 850 officers and ratings. During her sea trials on 3 July 1860, the ship reached 11.5 knots from her Maudslay, Sons and Field engine that produced 2,246 indicated horsepower (1,675 kW), although she was not fitted with her masts, rigging, or stores.

The lower gun deck armament of the converted ships consisted of eighteen 8-inch (65 cwt) shell guns and fourteen 32-pounders (56 cwt). The upper gun deck had six 8-inch shell guns and twenty-eight 32-pounders (56 cwt). The combined armament of the forecastle and quarterdeck totalled twenty-four 32-pounders (42 cwt) and a single 68-pounder (95 cwt) pivot gun.

== Construction and career ==
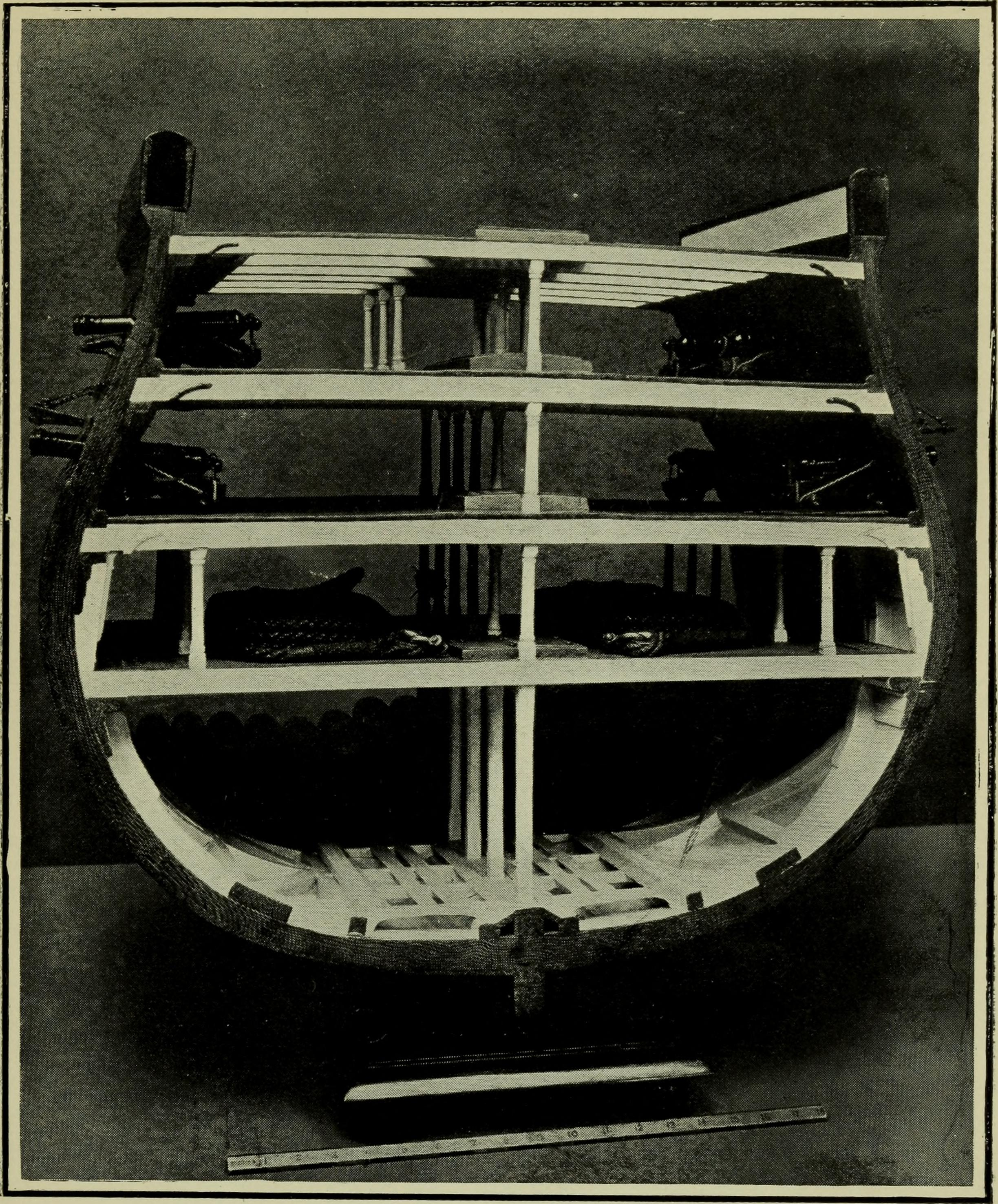
The midship section and disposition of Rodney's guns

Named after Admiral George Rodney and the second ship of her name to serve in the RN, Rodney was ordered in November 1826 and laid down at Pembroke Dockyard in July 1827. The ship was launched on 18 June 1833 and commissioned by Captain Hyde Parker on 28 August 1835. Completed on 7 December, she was assigned to the Mediterranean Fleet. Rodney was paid off on 12 May 1840 and was recommissioned the following day by Captain Robert Maunsell. During the Oriental Crisis of 1840, she served off the coast of Ottoman Syria and was blockading Alexandria, Egypt, after the bombardment of Acre on 3 November. Vice-Admiral Robert Stopford, the commander-in-chief of the Mediterranean Fleet, detached Commodore Charles Napier to assume command of the ships at Alexandria and arrived there on 21 November. Napier knew of Maunsell's friendship with Muhammad Ali and used him to conduct negotiations without authorization that ended the war on 27 November. The ship was paid off on 16 October 1843.

Rodney was recommissioned by Captain Edward Collier at Portsmouth Dockyard on 4 February 1845 and was initially assigned to the Channel Fleet, then the Experimental Squadron in 1845 and 1846 where she participated in speed trials. Afterward the ship returned to the Mediterranean where she served until paid off on 8 March 1849. Captain Charles Graham recommissioned the ship on 6 August 1851 for service with the Mediterranean Fleet, but participated in the naval review at Spithead before departing Britain. On 29 October 1853, she ran aground in the Dardanelles. She was refloated with assistance from the paddle yacht HMS Firebrand.

During the Crimean War, she served in the Black Sea. Rodney and her sister London contributed sailors to a landing party that assisted Turkish forces at Roustchouk (modern Ruse, Bulgaria), building a pontoon bridge and manning Turkish gunboats on the Danube River, in July–August 1854. The following month, the sisters offloaded some of their 32-pounder guns and their crews to serve as siege artillery during the siege of Sevastopol. They also contributed other crewmen and Royal Marines to the ad-hoc Naval Brigade. Between them, the sisters lost 31 men killed and 128 wounded of these men serving ashore.

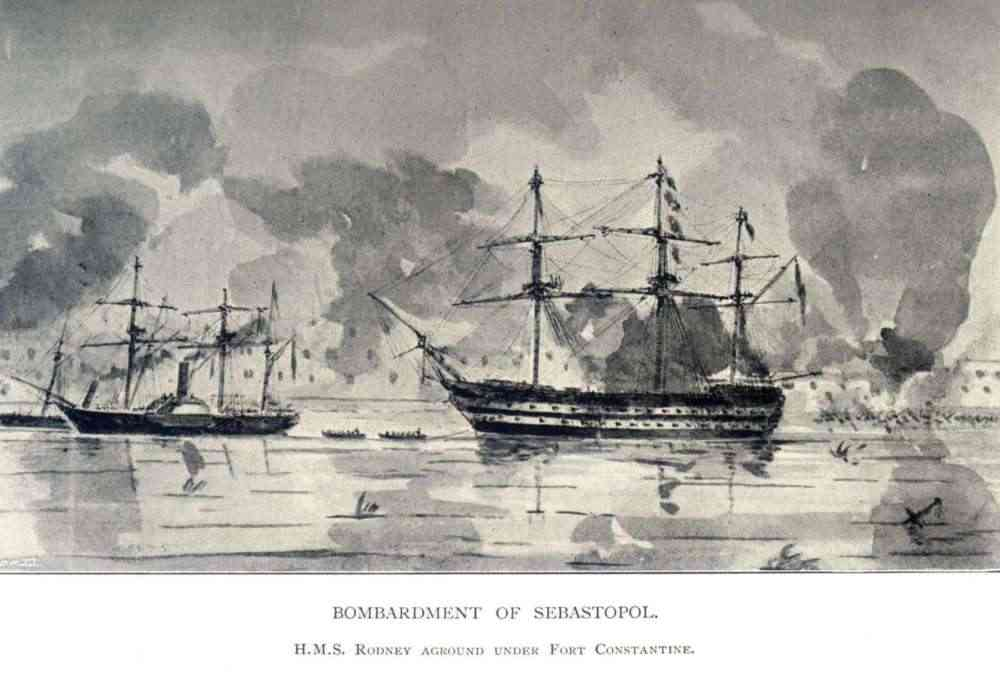
Spiteful towing Rodney during the bombardment of Sebastopol

During the naval bombardment of Sevastopol on 17 October, Rodney was towed by the 6-gun, paddle sloop Spiteful into the line of ships about 1,600 to 1,800 yards (1,500 to 1,600 m) away from Fort Constantine. Once the bombardment began the British ships were frequently struck by Russian shells; Rodney was towed forward to divert fire away from the damaged ships; she grounded in the narrow channel with her stern to the forts after her stern anchor cable was severed. She was towed free after nightfall by the Spiteful and the 6-gun, screw gunboat Lynx. The second rate's masts were seriously damaged whilst she was aground and she was set afire several times, but they were quickly extinguished. The ship was not otherwise seriously damaged, although two crewmen were wounded. Graham took ill on 22 November and was relieved by Captain George King. Rodney and 84-gun Vengeance were the only sailing ships to remain in the Crimea over the winter after the others were ordered home. Captain Henry Keppel replaced King on 21 July 1855 and was replaced in his turn by Captain George Knyvett Wilson on 24 January 1856. Rodney brought back troops from the Crimea around that time and then briefly became a depot ship at Portsmouth in March. She was paid off on 20 August 1856.

The ship was converted into a screw ship of the line from March 1859 to January 1860. She was completed in June and placed in ordinary. Rodney was recommissioned at Sheerness Dockyard by Captain Algernon Heneage on 21 January 1867 to serve as the flagship of Vice-Admiral Henry Keppel in China. After the Yangzhou riot over Christian missionaries in that city on 22–23 August 1868, the ship was ordered there several months later as a show of force to ensure agreement to British demands for recompense. After pirates had attacked a British gunboat near Shantou in January 1869, Rodney contributed sailors for a landing party to deal with the culprits in cooperation with Chinese authorities. The ship returned home and was paid off on 27 April 1870, the last unarmoured wooden ship of the line in full commission. She was broken up in February 1882.
