= George Willes (cricketer) =

English cricketer and clergyman

Personal information
- Full name: George Edward Willes
- Born: 16 August 1844; Hamstall Ridware, Staffordshire, England
- Died: 8 September 1901 (aged 57); Burnham, Buckinghamshire, England
- Batting: Right-handed
- Relatives: Edmund Willes (cousin)

Domestic team information
- Years: Team
- 1865–1866: Cambridge University

Career statistics
Competition	First-class
Matches	5
Runs scored	114
Batting average	14.25
100s/50s	–/1
Top score	51
Catches/stumpings	–/–
- Source: Cricinfo, 10 September 2023

George Edward Willes (16 August 1844 – 8 September 1901) was an English clergyman and a cricketer who played in five first-class cricket matches for Cambridge University in 1865 and 1866. He was born at Hamstall Ridware, Staffordshire and died at Burnham, Buckinghamshire.

Willes was educated at Rugby School and at Trinity College, Cambridge. He played cricket at Rugby as a right-handed middle-order batsman, but in his first year at Cambridge University in 1864 did not progress beyond the trial matches. In both 1865 and 1866 he was picked for a few early-season matches, but often batted well down the order; his greatest success in first-class cricket came in the second innings of the 1866 match against the Marylebone Cricket Club (MCC) at Lord's when he was demoted to No 12 in a 12-a-side game and proceeded to hit 51 out of a last-wicket partnership of 79 which forced MCC to bat again when they appeared on course for an innings victory. He played only one further first-class match and was not picked for the University Match against Oxford University during his time at Cambridge. He continued to play in minor matches into his 50s.

Willes graduated from Cambridge University in 1868 with a Bachelor of Arts degree. The same year, he was ordained as a deacon in the Church of England and in 1869 he became a priest. He served as curate at parishes at Buckingham and at Aynho in Northamptonshire and was vicar of Christ Church, Epsom from 1874 to 1881. He was rector of Calverton in Buckinghamshire from 1881 to 1900, and then moved to Burnham as vicar, but died a year later.

The Oxford University cricketer Edmund Willes was a cousin.
