= HMS Chesapeake (1855) =

Frigate of the Royal Navy

History

United Kingdom
- Name: HMS Chesapeake
- Builder: Chatham Dockyard
- Launched: 27 September 1855
- Honours and awards: Participated in: Second Battle of Taku Forts (1859)
- Fate: Broken up in Charlton, 1867

General characteristics
- Class & type: Forte-class frigate
- Displacement: 1,610 tons
- Tons burthen: 1,111 tons
- Length: 235 ft (72 m)
- Propulsion: screw
- Complement: 510
- Armament: 51 guns

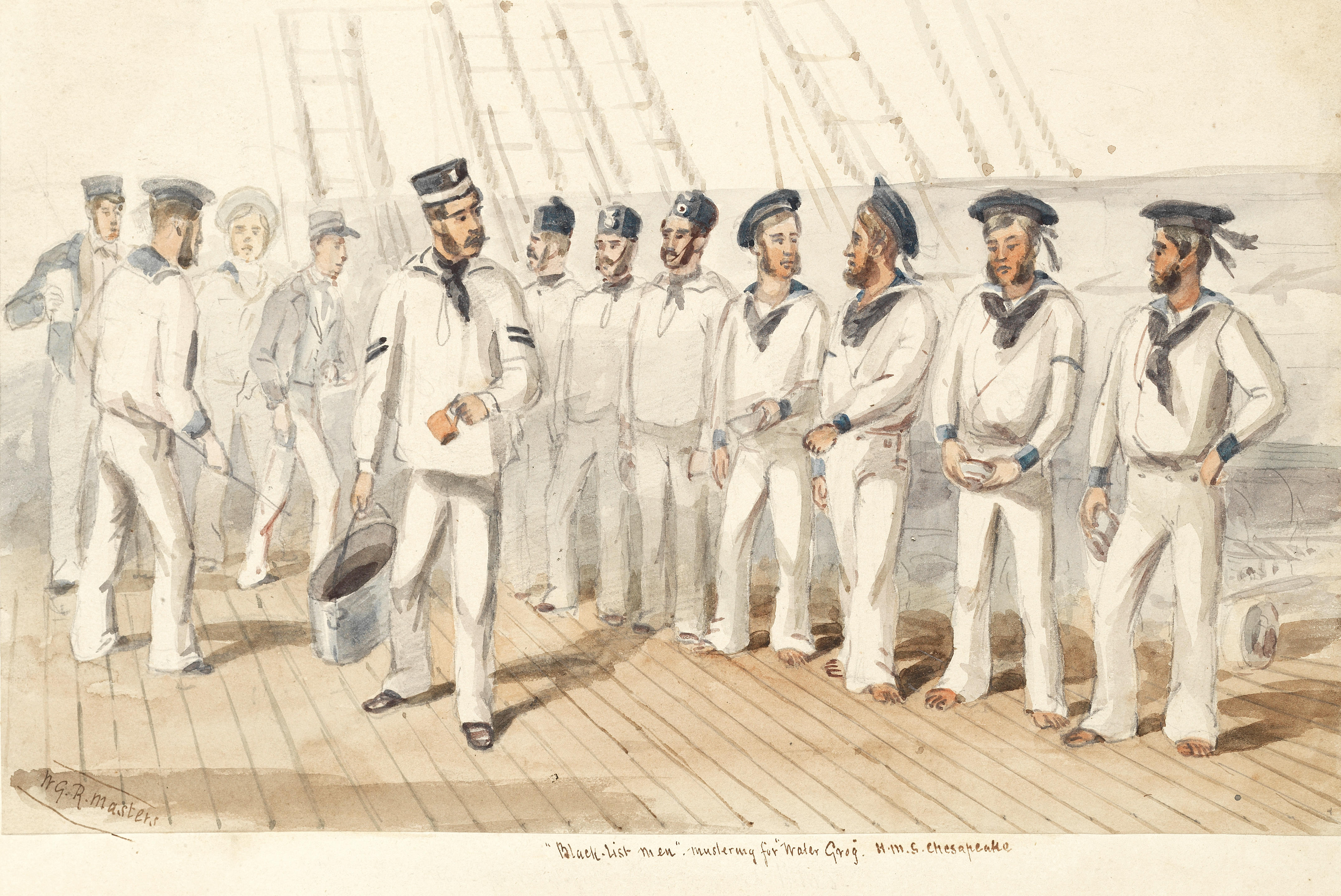
Black-list men, mustering for water grog on HMS Chesapeake in 1858

HMS Chesapeake was a Royal Navy screw-propelled 51-gun frigate launched in 1855, with a crew of 510 men.

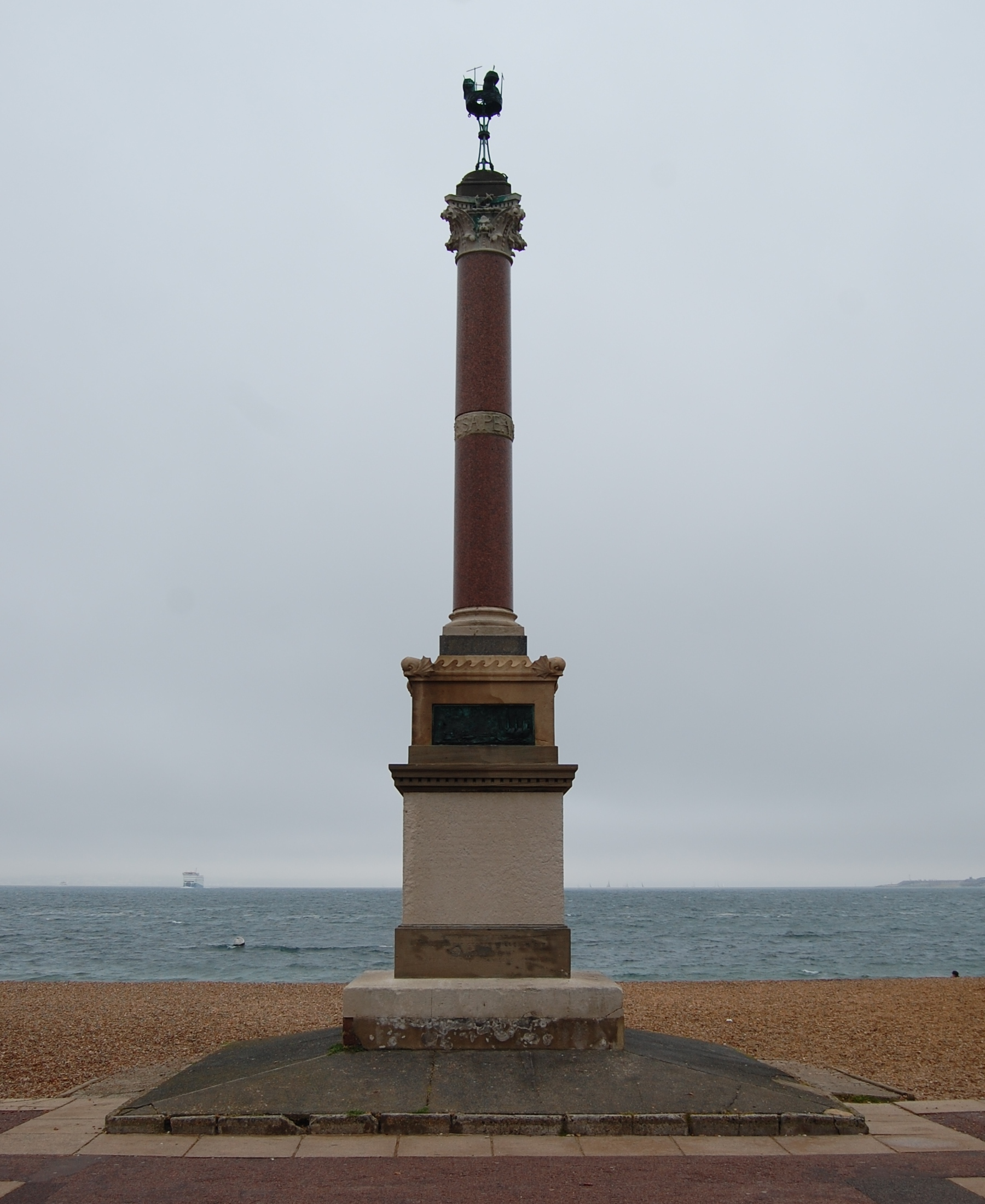
Chesapeake Monument, Southsea, Portsmouth

She saw action during the Second Opium War and there is a memorial to her losses at Southsea, near Portsmouth. She was the flagship of the British China Squadron in 1861.

Admiral of the Fleet, Lord Fisher served in her in 1860.
