= Armar Lowry Corry =

British admiral (1793–1855)

Rear-Admiral Armar Lowry Corry
- Born: 1793
- Died: 1 May 1855 (aged 61–62); Paris, France
- Military career
- Allegiance: United Kingdom
- Branch: Royal Navy
- Rank: Rear-Admiral
- Commands: HMS Barham; HMS Superb; Channel Squadron
- Conflicts: Crimean War

Rear-Admiral Armar Lowry Corry (1793 – 1 May 1855, in Paris) was a British naval officer.

== Naval career ==
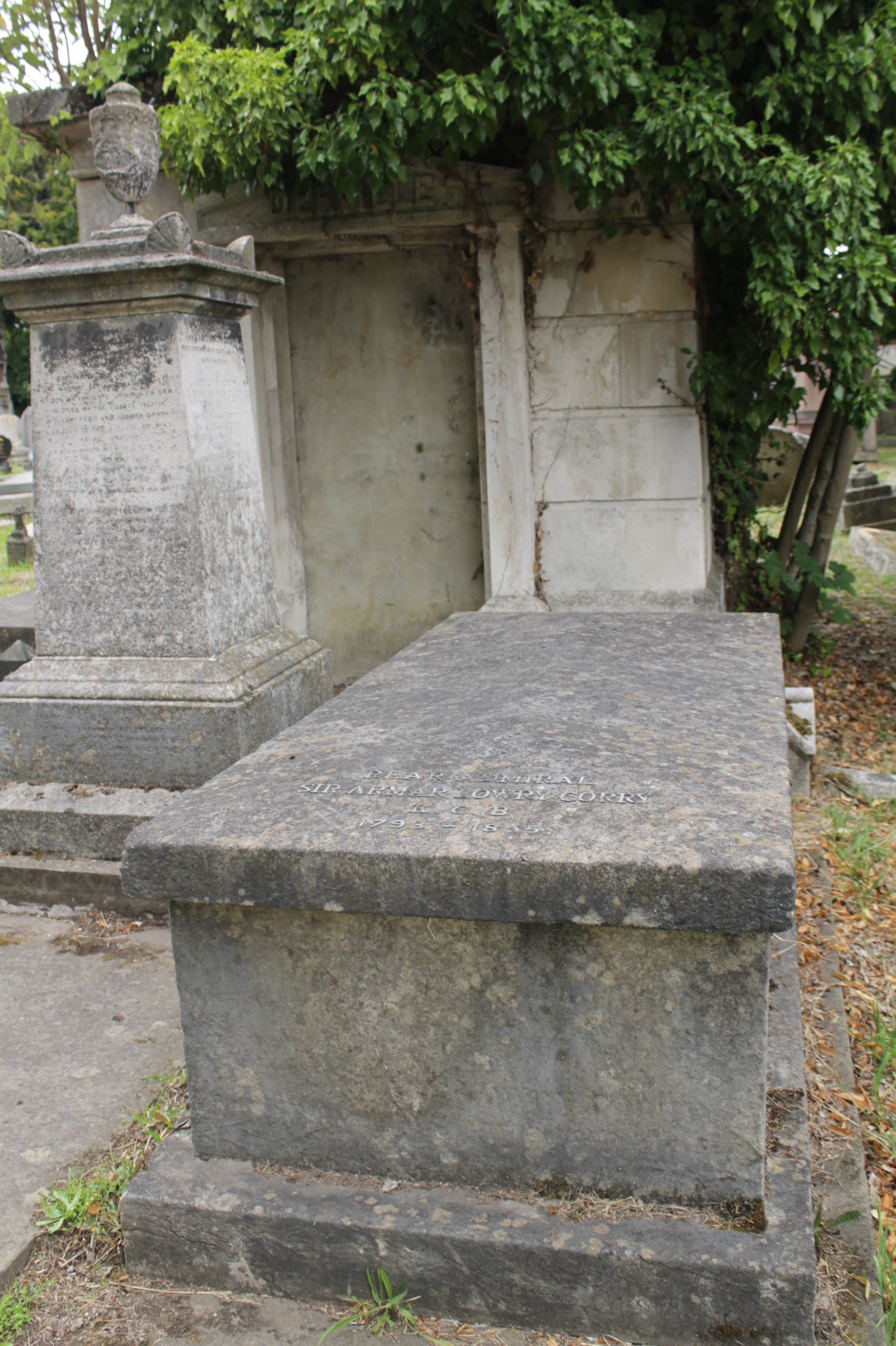
The grave of Sir Armar Lowry Corry, Kensal Green Cemetery, London (front)

Corry entered the Royal Navy on 1 August 1805, became a Lieutenant on 28 April 1812, a Commander on 13 June 1815, and Captain on 23 July 1821. From 1835 to 1839 he was captain of HMS Barham on the coast of Spain and in 1844–45 served in the Channel Squadron as Captain of HMS Superb. Promoted to Rear-Admiral on 8 March 1852, he was employed "in command of the Western Squadron" until 1853. He commanded the Channel Squadron from 24 May that year until February 1854, flying his flag in HMS Prince Regent, captained by Frederick Hutton. He was then assigned as second-in-command to Vice-Admiral Sir Charles Napier, who was to command the British fleet in the Baltic. While Napier left for the Baltic with the steam ships of the line, Corry, flying his flag in HMS Neptune, again captained by Hutton, followed some weeks later with the division of ships powered only by sail. He fell ill during the campaign and was invalided home, but never fully recovered and died in Paris on 1 May 1855.

In 1817, Corry visited Egypt as the captain of his brother's yacht Osprey. There he and his brother, Lord Belmore, of Enniskillen, visited such sights as the Temple of Dendur, where Corry inscribed his name as graffiti in the Temple of Dendur. It can be seen today prominently inscribed at the Temple, which resides at the New York Metropolitan Museum. The inscription reads: "A L Corry RN 1817" ("RN" stands for "Royal Navy").

== Personal life ==
In 1842 he married Elizabeth Rosetta Massy-Dawson. The couple's children included Juliana, who married Major Robert Poore (1834–1918). Juliana's children included Major Robert Poore (1866–1938) who married Flora, sister of the 13th Duke of Hamilton; and Nina Poore (1878–1951), who married the Duke and thus became Duchess of Hamilton.

Lowry-Corry was buried in Kensal Green Cemetery, London.

== See also ==
- O'Byrne, William Richard (1849). "Corry, Armar Lowry" . A Naval Biographical Dictionary . John Murray – via Wikisource.
