= HMS Vanguard (1835) =

Vanguard-class ship of the line

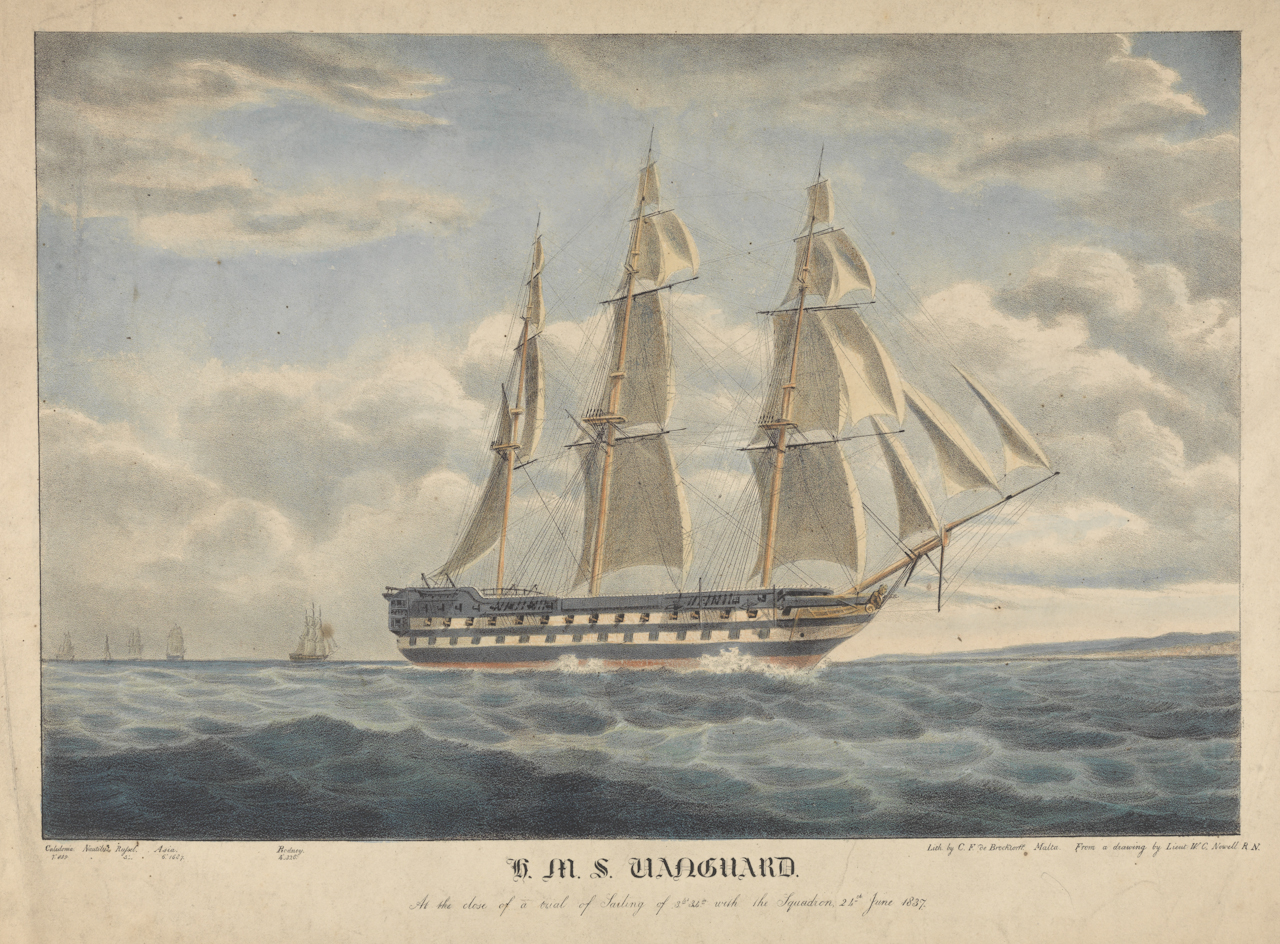
- Vanguard, at the close of a sailing trial on 24 June 1837

History

United Kingdom
- Name: Vanguard
- Ordered: 23 June 1832
- Builder: HM Dockyard, Pembroke
- Laid down: May 1833
- Launched: 25 August 1835
- Commissioned: 1837
- Renamed: Ajax, 1867
- Fate: Broken up, 1875

General characteristics
- Class & type: 80-gun, second-rate, Vanguard class ship of the line
- Displacement: 2889 tons (2935.4 tonnes)
- Tons burthen: 2,608 62/94 (bm)
- Length: 190 ft (57.9 m) (gun deck)
- Beam: 57 ft (17.4 m)
- Depth of hold: 23 ft 4 in (7.1 m)
- Sail plan: Full-rigged ship
- Complement: 720
- Armament: 80 muzzle-loading, smoothbore guns: Lower gun deck: 28 × 32 pdr guns + 2 × 68 pdr carronades; Upper gun deck: 26 × 32 pdr guns + 2 × 68 pdr carronades; Forecastle & Quarterdeck: 22 × 32 pdr guns

The sixth HMS Vanguard, of the British Royal Navy was a 78-gun (or 80-gun) second-rate ship of the line, launched on 25 August 1835 at Pembroke Yard. She was the first of a new type of sailing battleship: a Symondite.

== Construction ==
The Vanguard was designed by John Edye, Chief Clerk in the Surveyor's Office, to the directions of the Surveyor, Captain Sir William Symonds. The Vanguard was the first of a class of eleven. She was ordered from Pembroke Yard in June 1832; HMS Collingwood was ordered 'as a duplicate frame using the moulds of Vanguard, to test the efficacy of an American scheme whereby duplicate frames were stored for many years.' Vanguard was laid down in May 1833; she required 60 skilled men for 16 weeks to set up the frame. She was launched on schedule in August 1835. At the time she was the broadest ship ever built in England. 'Vanguard cost £56,983 to build, and a further £20,756 to fit for sea.' Her construction used 3,560 loads of timber and required 186 man-years.

== Service life ==
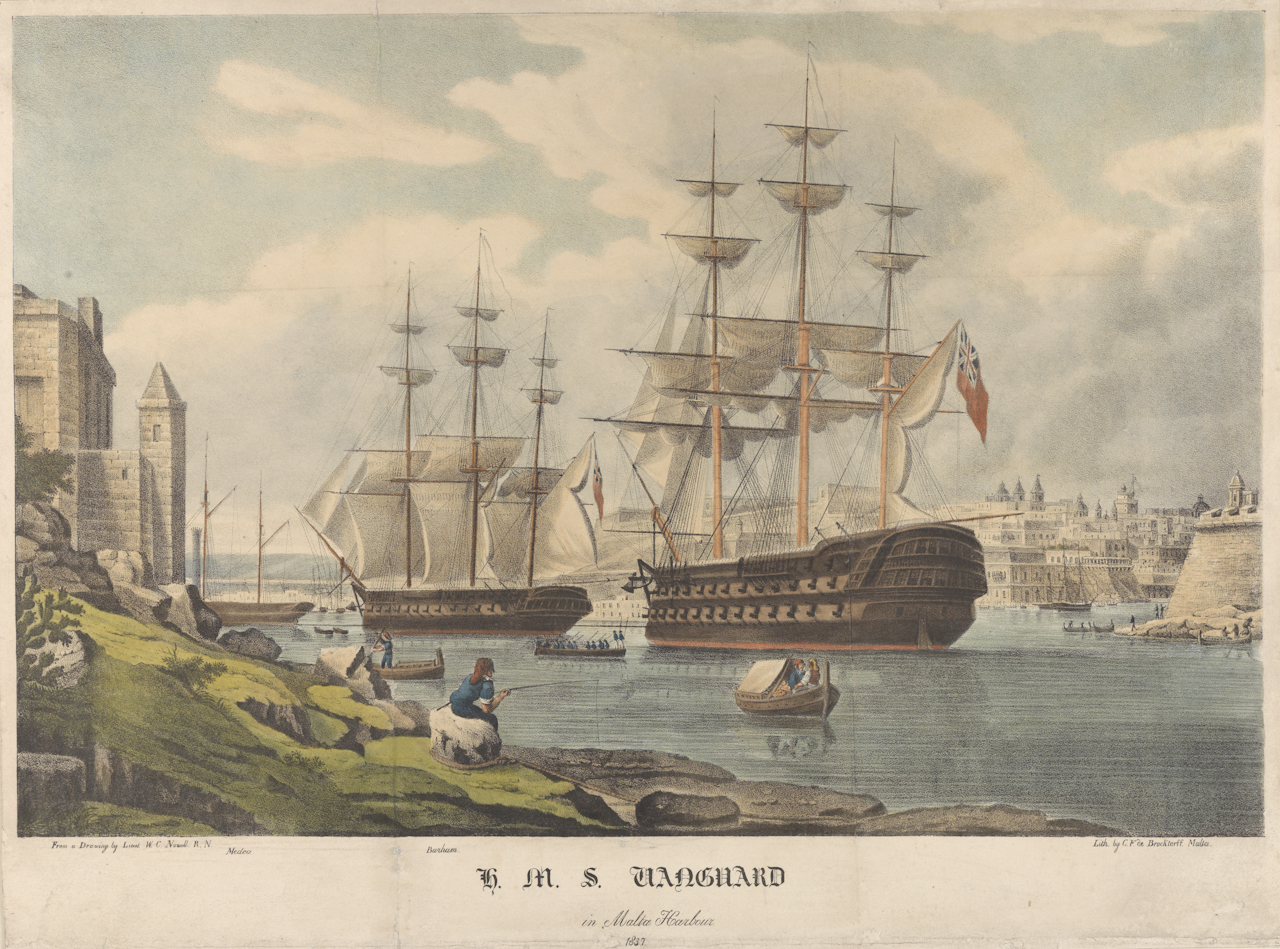
Vanguard in Malta Harbour in 1837, with Medea and Barham

Vanguard was commissioned in 1837 by Captain Sir Thomas Fellowes, with the normal picked complement of officers, including Baldwin Walker as First Lieutenant and Mr Miller, one of Symonds's favourite sailing masters. The object was clear. Symonds wanted his ships to be tried by men capable of making the best of their qualities... Out in the Mediterranean Vanguard soon made a name for herself as the fastest ship in the fleet, with the handiness of a frigate when beat out of Grand Harbour [Malta].' At the end of her first three-year commission Captain Fellowes wrote that Vanguard had 'great stability' was 'very easy at sea and works less than ships of her class' and had 'great advantage in all points of sailing.'

On the night of 30 January 1838, Vanguard was at Malta under the command of Captain Sir Thomas Fellowes. The ship's First Lieutenant, C.M.M. Wright, ordered the Assistant Surgeon, Robert Thomas Charles Scott, to stomach-pump a drunken seaman. Scott expressed the medical opinion that a stomach-pump should not be administered. Wright ordered him to give it anyway as a punishment and reminded Scott that it was an order he had received. A short while later Wright ordered Scott to do the same to another seaman. The next morning Scott reported the matter to Commander Baldwin Walker who reported Scott to the Captain for disrespect and disobedience of a lawful order. Captain Fellowes threatened Scott with a court martial and reported him to Sir William Burnett, the Physician-General of the Navy. When this affair became public knowledge, an Admiralty Order was issued banning the use of a stomach-pump as a punishment.

Captain David Dunn commanded Vanguard from 2 April 1843 to August 1843. Vanguard again served in the Mediterranean (including operations on the coast of Syria in 1840), and off Lisbon. In October 1843 Vanguard was out of commission at Devonport.

On 4 February 1845, Vanguard was commissioned by Captain George Wickens Willes, and served in the Channel Squadron, the 1845 and 1846 Evolutionary Squadrons, and in Mediterranean.

In the first trial of the Evolutionary Squadron of 1845, Vanguard (Captain George Willes) and her sister Superb (Captain Anwar Lowry Corry) were the slowest battleships in the squadron. The Surveyor (Symonds) thought that they had been badly stowed and needed recoppering. Once this was done they performed well. Vanguard's captain wrote: 'such an entire change has taken place in her motion at sea, steering and working generally (although she is still deficient in her weights low down) that I can scarcely bring myself to believe she is the same ship.' Vanguard was refitted after the 1845 trials (as were Superb and Canopus). In the August 1846 trials, Vanguard and Canopus were 'nearly alike in performance, with the former superior in smooth water, and the latter in rough.' (The significance of Canopus is that she was regarded as one of the best of the previous type of 84-gun two-deckers.)

In May 1846 Evolutionary Squadron exercised firing the stern batteries. This was a rare occurrence and reflects no credit on any of the two-deckers:

- Vanguard took ten minutes to clear for action and then fired two rounds from each stern gun. However the extreme overhang of the stern prevented the muzzles running clear, with the result that there was a minor fire.
- Superb took 15 minutes to clear for action plus an hour to remove her sashes, and then was able to fire without incident.
- Canopus was excused firing altogether.

Captain Willes died on 26 October 1847. Captain George Frederick Rich commanded Vanguard in the Mediterranean from 6 November 1847 until Vanguard paid off in March 1849.

Vanguard did not see service during the Crimean War.

Unlike most members of the Vanguard-class, Vanguard was not converted to steam.

Vanguard was renamed Ajax in 1867, to allow her former name to be given to an ironclad battleship then being laid down in the ways. Ajax was broken up in 1875 at Chatham Dockyard.
