= HMS Rattler (1843) =

Sloop of the Royal Navy

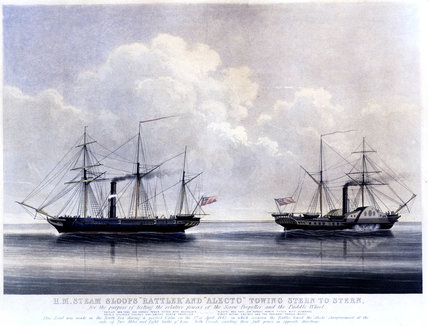
- Rattler (left) and Alecto (right) in their 1845 competition

History

United Kingdom
- Name: HMS Rattler
- Ordered: 24 February 1842
- Builder: Sheerness Dockyard
- Cost: £9,400 plus £17,413 for fitting
- Laid down: April 1842
- Launched: 13 April 1843
- Commissioned: 12 December 1844 Woolwich
- Honours and awards: Burma 1852
- Fate: Broken up, 1856

General characteristics
- Class & type: Screw sloop
- Displacement: 1,112 tons
- Tons burthen: 88880/94 (bm)
- Length: 195 ft (59.44 m) overall 176 ft 6 in (53.80 m) gundeck, 157 ft 9.5 in (48.09 m) keel for tonnage
- Beam: 32 ft 8 in (9.96 m) maximum, 32 ft 6 in (9.91 m) for tonnage
- Draught: 11 ft 5 1/2 in (3.49 m) (mean)
- Depth of hold: 18 ft 7.5 in (5.68 m)
- Installed power: 200 nhp; 437 ihp (326 kW)
- Propulsion: Maudslay, Sons & Field four-cylinder vertical single-expansion steam engine; Single strap-driven screw
- Sail plan: Barquentine
- Speed: 10.074 knots (18.657 km/h)
- Complement: 180
- Armament: 1 × 8-inch (60 cwt) pivot gun; 8 × 32-pounder (25cwt) broadside guns

HMS Rattler was a 9-gun steam screw sloop of the Royal Navy, and one of the first British warships to be completed with screw propulsion. She was originally ordered as a paddle wheel 4-gun steam vessel (Steam Vessel Second Class – SV2) from Sheerness Dockyard on 12 March 1841. She was reordered on 24 February 1842 as a propeller type 9-gun (867-ton BM type) sloop from HM Royal Dockyard, Sheerness, as a new vessel. William Symonds had redesigned the ship as a screw propeller driven vessel.

She was the fifth ship so named since the name was first introduced into the Royal Navy for a 16-gun sloop launched by Wilson of Sandgate on 22 March 1783 and sold on 6 September 1792.

== Construction ==
The keel of Rattler was laid in April 1842 and launched on 13 April 1843 at Sheerness Dockyard. The length of her gundeck was 176 ft 6 in (53.80 m) with a keel length of 157 ft 9.5 in (48.09 m) with an overall length of 195 ft 0 in (59.44 m). Her maximum breadth was 32 ft 8 in (9.96 m) with 32 ft 6 in (9.91 m) reported for tonnage. Her Depth of hold was 18 ft 7.5 in (5.68 m). She had a mean draught of 11 ft 5.5 in (3.49 m). Her builder's measure for tonnage was 888 80/94 (bm) and she displaced 1,112 tons.

After launching, she was towed to East India Dock at Maudslay's yard to have her machinery installed. She was equipped with two fire tube rectangular boilers. Her engine was a Maudslay, Son & Field four-cylinder vertical single-expansion steam engine with double cylinders of 40.25 in (1,022.35 mm) with a working stroke of 48 in (1,219.20 mm), rated at 200 nhp. Once her machinery was installed she was moved to Woolwich Dockyard where she was coppered.

Her armament consisted of either a single 8-inch (60 cwt) muzzle loading smooth bore (MLSB) 8-foot 10-inch shell gun or a single 68-pounder (65 cwt) MLSB 10-foot solid shot gun on a pivot mount and eight Blomefeld 32-pounder (25cwt) MLSB solid shot guns (bored out 18-pounders) on broadside trucks.

=== Trials ===
Her propeller trials commenced on 30 October 1843. During her full power steam trials her engine generated 428 indicated horsepower (319 kW) for a speed of 10.074 knots (18.657 km/h).

Rattler was completed for sea on 30 January 1845 at a first cost of machinery - £9,400 and fitting of £17,413.

== Service history ==
Her first commission was on 12 December 1844 at Woolwich under Commander Henry Smith, RN (promoted to Captain on 27 June 1846). She was assigned to Portsmouth. On 3 April 1845 the Admiralty held a demonstration on the power of the screw propeller over the paddle wheel. Rattler was pitted against her near sister Alecto. Both vessels had the same basic hull form, though Rattler was just over 12 feet longer. Both had 200 NHP engines installed. The sea was perfectly calm. Rattler had a three mast rig whereas Alecto only had two masts. With the engines of both vessels working Rattler developed 300 indicated horsepower (220 kW) whereas Alecto only reached 141 indicated horsepower (105 kW). The result had Rattler towing Alecto astern at 2.8 knots (5.2 km/h). The results were only to demonstrate to skeptics the soundness of the Admiralty's decision to use the propeller over the paddle wheel. This demonstration would be repeated two more times by 1849. It is this which is commemorated to this day in Portsmouth Historic Dockyard. A large number of propellers were also tested on Rattler during this period to find the most effective screw design.

On 17 May 1845 Rattler and steamers HMS Monkey and HMS Blazer towed HMS Erebus and Terror toward Orkney but abandoned the tow 60 nautical miles (110 km; 69 mi) north-west of Stromness. Rattler returned to Woolwich on 10 June. In June 1845 Rattler served with the 1845 Experimental Squadron. On 29 August 1846, while serving with the Squadron of Evolution, she ran aground at Lisbon, Portugal; she was refloated. She departed the Squadron in November 1846 for Gibraltar, from which she towed HMS Superb (1842). On 17 November 1846 her new commander was Commander Richard Moorman, RN and transferred to the South American Station. On 13 September 1847 she was paid off at Woolwich.

=== West Coast of Africa ===
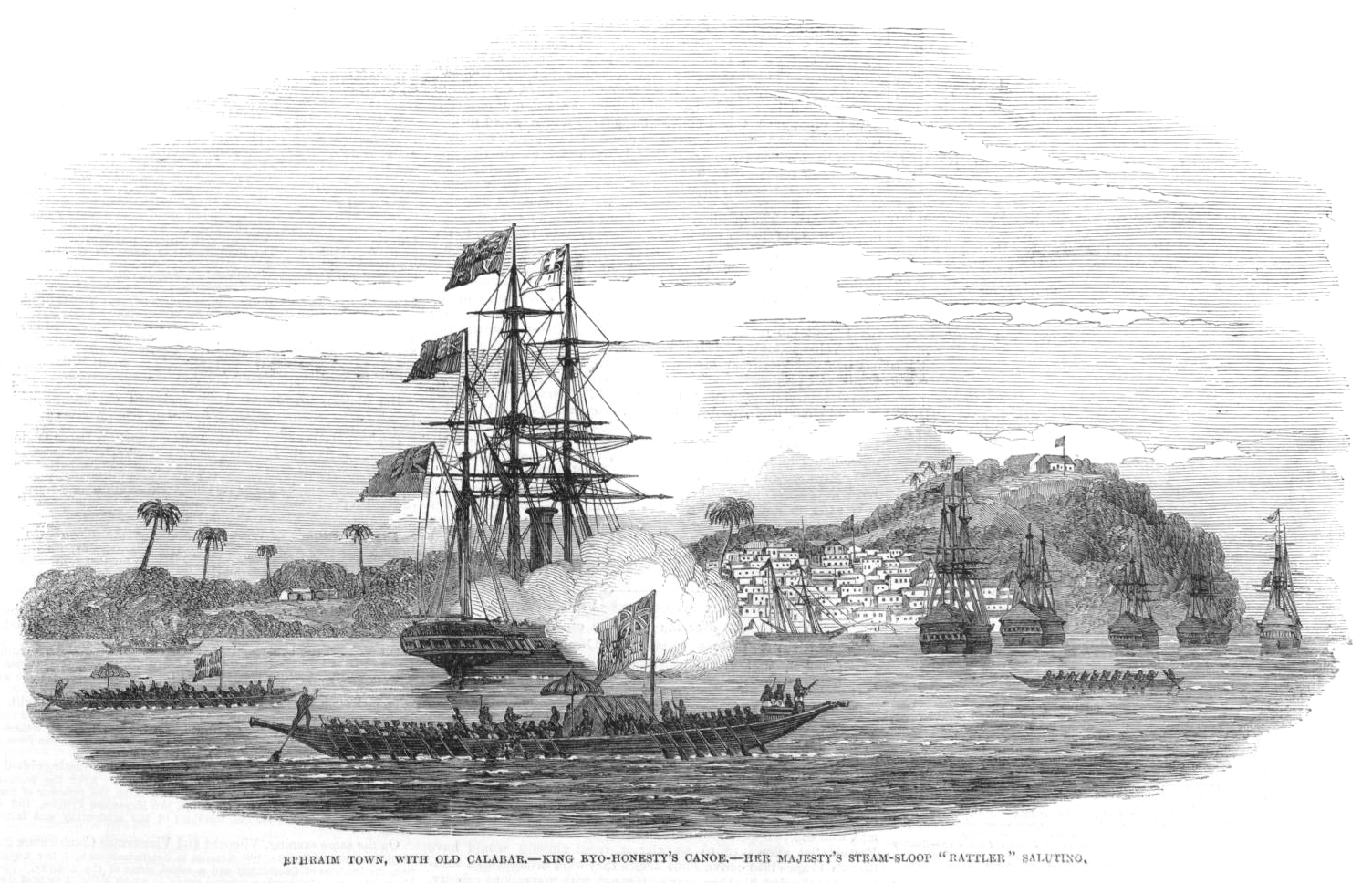
Rattler saluting Eyo Honesty's State Canoe

Commander Arthur Cumming commanded Rattler from 12 February 1849 to 15 April 1851. During this time she was stationed off the west coast of Africa. On 30 October 1849 she captured the Brazilian slave brigantine Alepide. She paid off at Woolwich on 15 April 1851.

=== East Indies Station ===
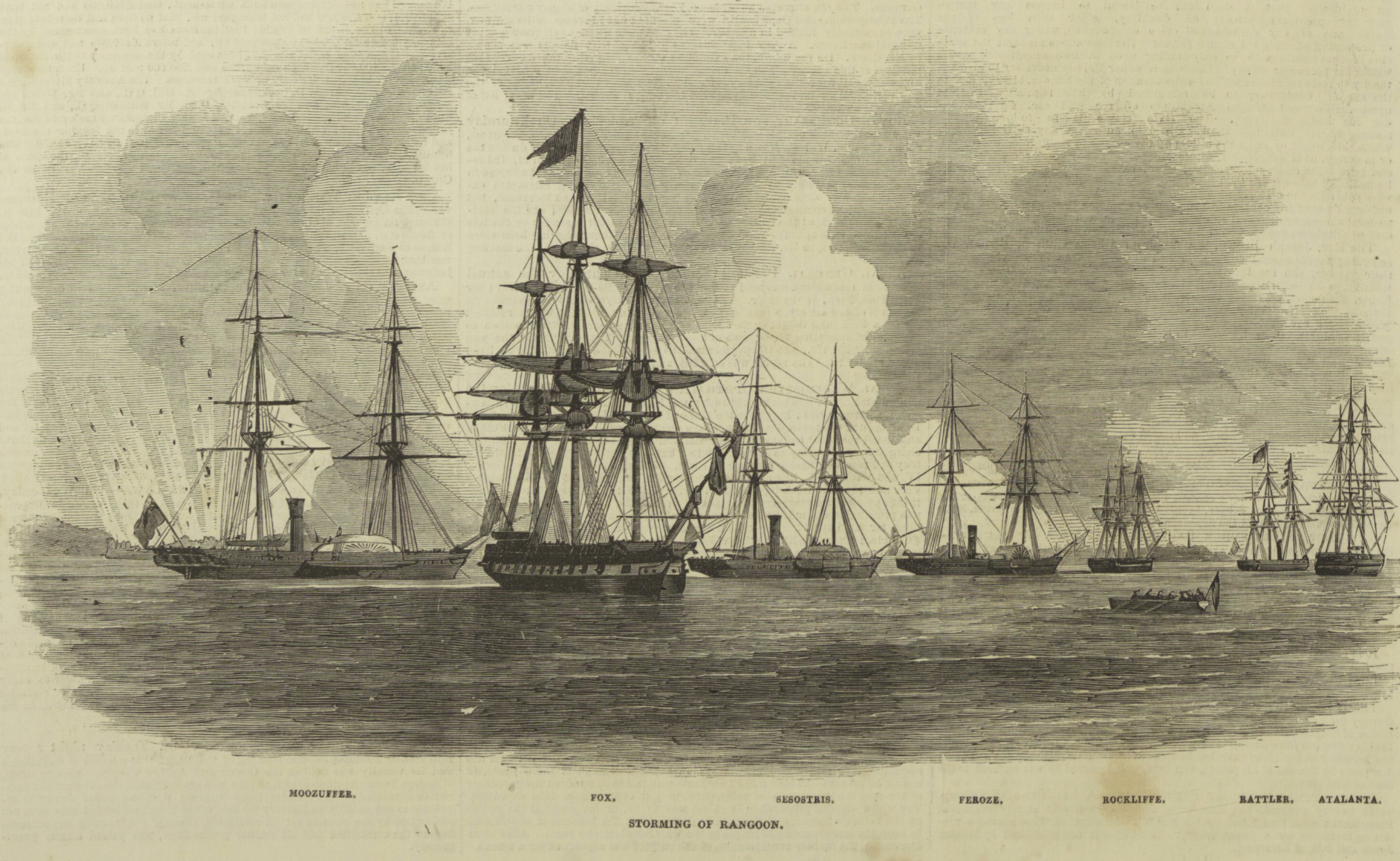
Rattler at the storming of Rangoon, 14 April 1852

On 28 August 1851 she was commissioned for service on the East Indies Station under Commander Arthur Mellersh, RN at Woolwich. While on station the Second Burmese war (10 January 1852 to 30 June 1853) erupted. She became the Flagship of Rear-Admiral Charles John Austen, RN. In March 1853, Rattler struck a sunken rock at Amoy, China and was severely damaged. She was beached at Tae-tan (today's Dadan Island, Lieyu Township, Kinmen County, Fujian, Republic of China (Taiwan)) for repairs. She was in action against junks near Namguan on 11 May 1853. On 5 April 1855 she was under Commander William Abdy Gellows, RN for service in China and the East Indies. On 4 August 1855, Rattler, HMS Eaglet, and the USS Powhatan fought a naval battle near Tai O village, Lantau, with Chinese pirates. She was ordered to return to Home Waters in early 1856.

== Fate ==
Rattler returned to Home Waters, paying off at Woolwich on 17 May 1856. She was broken at Woolwich under contract with Mr Fulcher from 22 July to 26 November 1856.
