= HMS Alecto (1839) =

Sloop of the Royal Navy

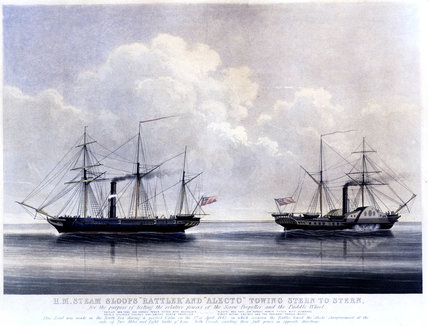
- Rattler (left) and Alecto (right) in their 1845 competition

History

United Kingdom
- Name: HMS Alecto
- Ordered: 25 February 1839
- Builder: Royal Dockyard, Portsmouth
- Cost: £27,268
- Laid down: July 1839
- Launched: 7 September 1839
- Completed: 12 December 1839
- Commissioned: 26 October 1839
- Fate: Broken up November 1865

General characteristics
- Type: Steam Vessels (SV3); Third Class Sloop
- Displacement: 1,283 tons
- Tons burthen: 795 87/94 bm
- Length: 164 ft 0 in (50.0 m) gundeck; 141 ft 8 in (43.2 m) keel for tonnage
- Beam: 32 ft 8 in (10.0 m) maximum; 32 ft 6 in (9.9 m) for tonnage
- Draught: 6 ft 0 in (1.8 m)forward; 7 ft 5 in (2.3 m) forward
- Depth of hold: 18 ft 7 in (5.7 m)
- Installed power: 200 nominal horsepower
- Propulsion: 2-cylinder VSE direct acting steam engine; Paddles
- Armament: 2 × 32-pdr (42 cwt) MLSB guns on pivot mounts; 2 × 32-pdr (25 cwt) MLSB guns on broadside trucks

HMS Alecto was an Alecto-class sloop designed by Sir William Symonds, Surveyor of the Navy. Originally classed as a steam vessel (SV3), her classification would be changed to a Third Class Sloop. She initially served in the Mediterranean, prior to her tug of war with the Rattler. She spent her time in the Americas and mainly on the anti-slavery patrol off the west coast of Africa. She was broken up in November 1865

Alecto was the second named vessel since it was used for a 12-gun fireship, launched by King of Dover on 26 May 1781 and sold in 1802.

== Construction ==
She was ordered on 25 February 1839 from Chatham Dockyard with her keel laid in July. She was launched about two months later on 7 September. Following her launch she was towed to Limehouse to have her boilers and machinery fitted. She returned to Chatham and was completed for sea on 12 December 1839 at an initial cost of £27,268 including the machinery cost of £10,700. (Note: A total cost accounting for inflation of approximately £2,445,800 in today's money.)

== Commissioned service ==
=== First Commission ===
She was commissioned on 26 October 1839 under the command of Lieutenant William Hoseason, RN for service in the Mediterranean. She returned to Home Waters at Portsmouth. In March 1845 she participated in a series of trials with her near sister the screw-driven HMS Rattler. On 3 April, the first of three tug of wars took place. Alecto and Rattler were joined by a hawser stern to stern. The weather was perfectly calm. The engine of the Rattler developed 300 indicated horsepower whereas Alecto could only reached 141 IHP. The result was Rattler towed Alecto astern at 2.8 knots. She paid off at Woolwich on 24 April 1845. She was refitted and reboilered at Woolwich at a cost of £18,110 for fitting and £10,073 for boilers.

=== Second Commission ===
She commissioned on 10 November 1845 under the command of Lieutenant Francis William Austen, RN, for service on the east coast of South America. Commander Vincent Amcotts Massingberd, RN, took command on 17 November 1846 for the North America and West Indies Station. She returned to Home Waters paying off at Woolwich on 22 June 1849. She was re-engined at Woolwich at a cost of £10,073.

=== Third Commission ===
She was commissioned for the anti-slavery patrol of the West Coast of Africa on 27 January 1852 under the command of Commander Stephen Smith Lowther Crofton, RN. She returned and paid off on 11 May 1854. She underwent a refit at Woolwich then Deptford for a cost of £10,143.

=== Fourth Commission ===
On 2 August 1855 she commissioned under Commander Robert Philips, RN, for the West Coast of Africa. Commander James Hunt, RN took command on 7 May 1856. On 27 August 1857 the slaver Eliza Jane was captured followed by the Onward on 13 September. She took Lewis McLane on 15 October followed by Clara Williams on the 26th. She took the slaver, Windward on 4 November. At the end of 1858 she returned to Home Waters paying off on 15 January 1859. She was refitted at Woolwich for £13,469 during 1859–1860.

=== Fifth Commission ===
She was commissioned on 27 January 1860 under Commander James Raby, RN, for continued service on the West Coast of Africa. On 15 August she captured the slaver, Constancia and another unnamed vessel on 11 July 1861. On 26 April 1861 she was in action at Porto Novo on the Niger River. She returned to Home Waters to pay off on 25 June 1862.

=== Sixth Commission ===
Her last commission was on 23 January 1863 under commander William Hans Blake, RN, for service on the east coast of South America. She returned to pay off for the last time in March 1865.

== Disposition ==
She was broken up in November 1865 by Henry Castle & Son at Charlton in November 1865.
