= HMS Superb (1842) =

Vanguard-class ship of the line

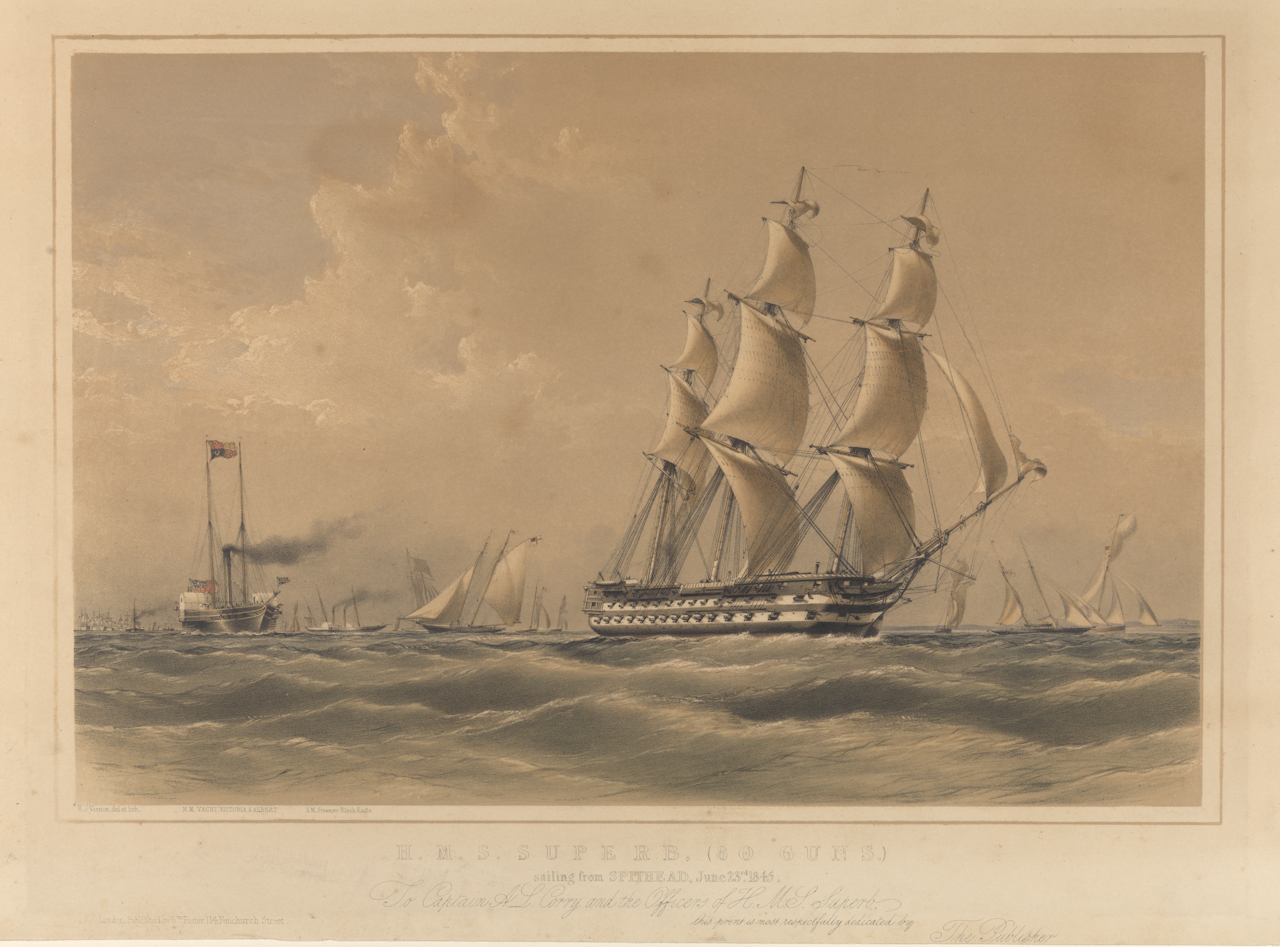
- Superb sailing from Spithead, 23 June 1845

History

United Kingdom
- Name: Superb
- Ordered: 15 June 1838
- Builder: HM Dockyard, Pembroke
- Laid down: November 1838
- Launched: 6 September 1842
- Commissioned: 26 April 1845
- Reclassified: As an accommodation ship (August–December 1864)
- Fate: Ordered to be scrapped, 3 November 1868

General characteristics
- Class & type: 80-gun, second-rate, Vanguard-class ship of the line
- Tons burthen: 2,583 42/94 (bm)
- Length: 190 ft (57.9 m) (gun deck)
- Beam: 56 ft 9 in (17.3 m)
- Depth of hold: 23 ft 4 in (7.1 m)
- Sail plan: Full-rigged ship
- Complement: 720
- Armament: 80 muzzle-loading, smoothbore guns: Lower gun deck: 28 × 32 pdr guns + 2 × 68 pdr carronades; Upper gun deck: 26 × 32 pdr guns + 2 × 68 pdr carronades; Forecastle & Quarterdeck: 22 × 32 pdr guns

HMS Superb was an 80-gun, second rate, Vanguard-class ship of the line built for the Royal Navy in the 1840s. She was broken up in 1869.

== Description ==
The Vanguard class was designed by Sir William Symonds, Surveyor of the Navy, with each ship built with a slightly different hull shape to evaluate their speed and handling characteristics. Superb had a length at the gundeck of 190 feet 8 inches (58.1 m) and 153 feet 6 inches (46.8 m) at the keel. She had a beam of 57 feet (17.4 m), a draught of 18 feet 10 inches (5.7 m) and a depth of hold of 23 feet 4 inches (7.1 m). The ship's tonnage was 2,583 42/94 tons burthen. The Vanguards had a wartime crew of 720 officers and ratings.<

The Vanguard class ships of the line were armed with twenty 32-pounder (56 cwt) (Note: "Cwt" is the abbreviation for hundredweight, 56 cwt referring to the weight of the gun.) cannon and two 68-pounder carronades on her lower gundeck, twenty-eight 32-pounder (50 cwt) cannon and another pair of 68-pounder carronades on the upper gundeck. On her quarterdeck were fourteen 32-pounder (42 cwt) cannon and on the forecastle deck were eight more 32-pounder (42 cwt) cannon.

== Construction and career ==
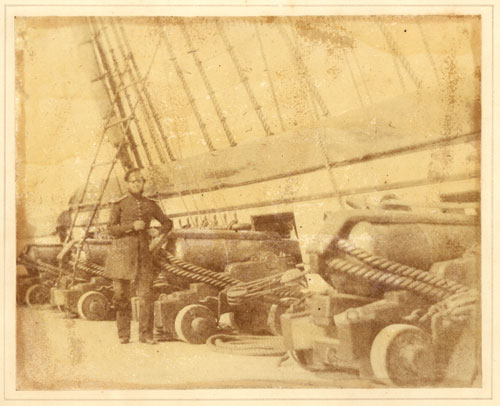
Officer on board Superb, 1845

Superb was ordered from Pembroke Dockyard on 15 June 1838 and laid down the following November. She was launched on 6 September 1842 and was towed to Plymouth for fitting out by 26 April 1845. Her construction cost £54,979 and fitting out cost an additional £25,313.

After commissioning, Superb joined the Channel Fleet under the command of Captain Armar Lowry Corry. In February 1845, she joined the Experimental Squadron of eight ships, four of them built by Symonds. They engaged in three competitive cruises to test Symonds’ new hull designs against older, traditionally built warships. The whole Squadron was reviewed by Queen Victoria and Prince Albert at Spithead on 22 June and the trials were completed by December, Superb having proved to be the fastest ship in the last cruise. Overall, the results were inconclusive and became mired by political wrangling and professional rivalry, with the result that Symonds resigned. Superb took part in further trials the following year with yet more ships, this time called The Squadron of Evolution. The whole project was made irrelevant by the advent of steam propulsion and the Vanguard class were some of the last major Royal Navy warships to rely solely on sail propulsion.

In November 1848, Superb joined the Mediterranean Fleet, and continued there until paying off into the reserve at HM Dockyard, Chatham in June 1852. Superb was broken up in 1869.
