= George Wickens Willes =

British Royal Navy captain

Captain George Wickens Willes
- Born: 1785
- Died: 26 October 1846 (aged 60–61); Malta
- Occupation: Royal Navy captain

George Wickens Willes (1785 – 26 October 1846) was a British Royal Navy captain.

== Biography ==
Willes was the son of Lieutenant John Willes of the navy (1753–1797), who lost a leg at Gibraltar in 1782, was born in 1785, and in 1794 entered on the books of the Royal William, flagship of Sir Peter Parker (1721–1811) at Spithead. In 1796 he was borne on the books of the Fairy sloop, commanded by his maternal uncle, John Irwin, whom, early in 1797, he followed to the Prince George; in this ship he was present at the battle of Cape St. Vincent. He was afterwards with Irwin in the Lively, Boston, Formidable, and Queen Charlotte. He was in the Success, with Captain Shuldham Peard, at the blockade of Malta, and the capture of the Généreux on 18 February 1800, when he was severely wounded; he was still on the Success when she was taken by Ganteaume on 13 February 1801. On 6 November 1801 he was promoted to the rank of lieutenant; served in the Sophie sloop; in the Active, one of the ships which passed the Dardanelles in February 1807, and in the Spartan, with Captain Jahleel Brenton. During 1809, in command of the frigate's boats, he was repeatedly engaged in storming batteries or destroying coasting vessels in the Adriatic or among the Ionian Islands. He was still in the Spartan when, in Naples Bay on 3 May 1810, she engaged, defeated, and put to flight a Franco-Neapolitan squadron, carrying in the aggregate 95 guns and 1,400 men. ‘I was myself,’ wrote Brenton, ‘wounded about the middle of the action, which lasted two hours; but my place was most ably supplied by Mr. Willes, first lieutenant, whose merit becomes more brilliant by every opportunity he has of showing it. He is, without exception, one of the best and most gallant officers I ever met with.’ Willes, who was himself severely wounded, was promoted on 2 June 1810 to be commander; he was also granted permission to accept and wear the order of St. Ferdinand and Merit, third class.

In 1811–12 he commanded the Leveret brig in the North Sea, where he captured several of the enemy's privateers; he was afterwards in the Bacchus on the Irish station, and on 7 June 1814 he was made a captain. In 1817–18 he commanded the Cherub on the coast of Africa; in 1819–1820, the Wye in the North Sea; in 1823–7, the Brazen, on the South American and African stations; and in 1836 the Dublin, as flag-captain to Sir Graham Eden Hamond, on the coast of South America. In February 1845 he commissioned the Vanguard of 80 guns, in which, after a few months in the Channel, he went out to the Mediterranean. He died at Malta on 26 October 1846. Willes married, in 1814, Anne Ellen, daughter of Sir Edmund Lacon, bart., and left issue, among others, the Admiral Sir George Ommanney Willes, G.C.B., who possessed a portrait of his father.
