= Thomas Lethbridge =

Thomas Lethbridge may refer to:

- T. C. Lethbridge (Thomas Charles Lethbridge, 1901–1971), English archaeologist, parapsychologist, and explorer
- Thomas Lethbridge (Royal Navy officer) (1829–1892)
- Sir Thomas Lethbridge, 2nd Baronet (1778–1849), MP for Somerset
- Sir Thomas Lethbridge, 7th Baronet (born 1950) of the Lethbridge baronets
