= HMS Trafalgar (1841) =

Ship of the line of the Royal Navy

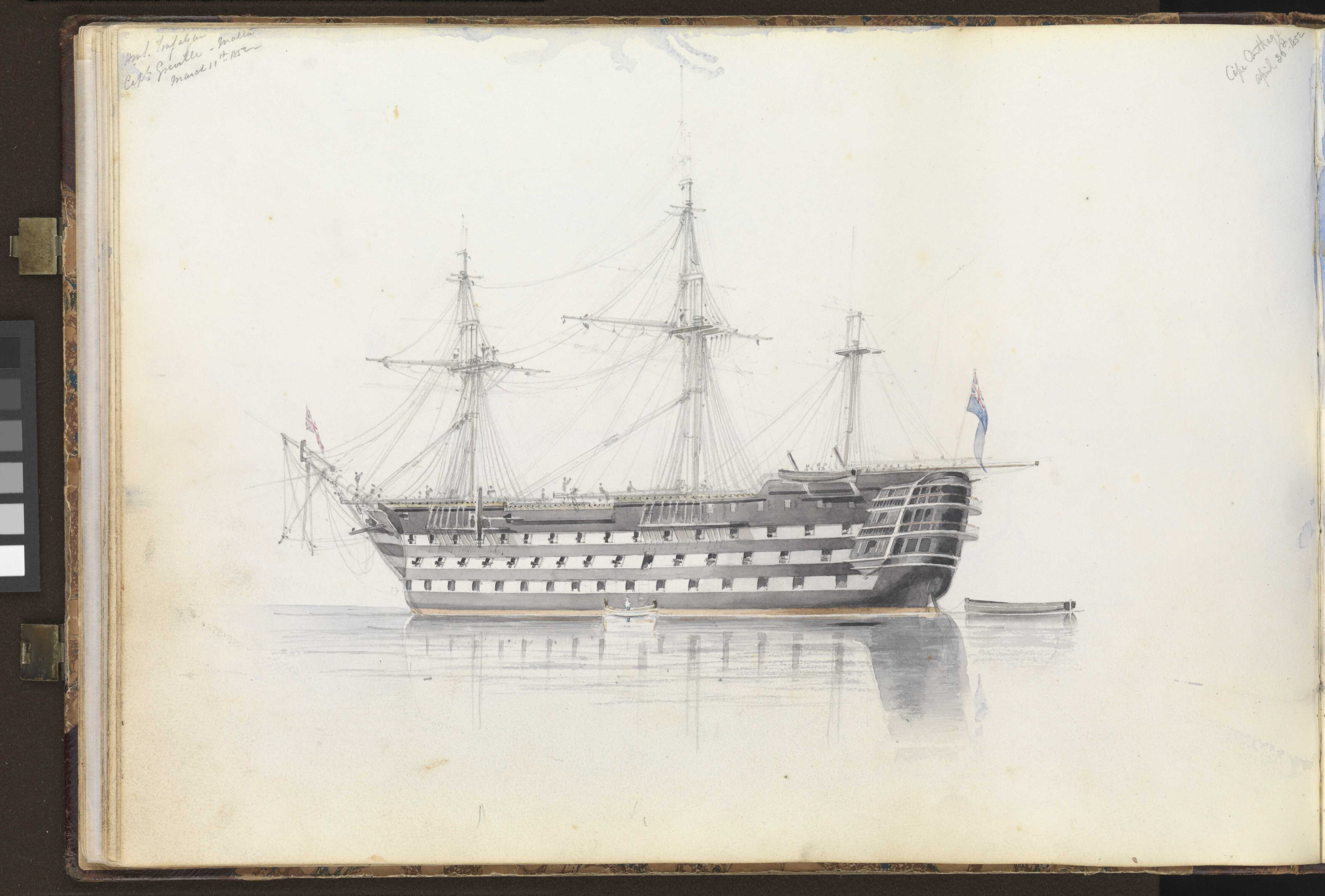
- Sketch of Trafalgar in Grand Harbour, Malta, 11 March 1852 by George Pechell Mends

History

United Kingdom
- Name: Trafalgar
- Ordered: 19 February 1825
- Builder: Woolwich Dockyard
- Laid down: November 1829
- Launched: 21 June 1841
- Renamed: Boscawen, 1873
- Fate: Sold, 1906

General characteristics (as built)
- Class & type: Broadened Caledonia-class ship of the line
- Tons burthen: 272132/94 bm
- Length: 205 ft 6 in (62.6 m) (gun deck)
- Beam: 55 ft 8 in (17.0 m)
- Draught: 18 ft 3 in (5.6 m)
- Depth of hold: 23 ft 3 in (7.1 m)
- Propulsion: Sails
- Sail plan: Full-rigged ship
- Armament: 120 muzzle-loading, smoothbore guns: Gun deck: 30 × 32 pdrs, 2 × 68 pdr carronades; Middle gun deck: 32 × 32 pdrs, 2 × 68 pdr carronades; Upper gun deck: 32 × 32 pdrs, 2 × 68 pdr carronades; Quarterdeck: 16 × 32 pdr carronades; Forecastle: 2 × 32 pdrs, 2 × 32 pdr carronades

General characteristics (after conversion)
- Displacement: 3,850 long tons (3,910 t)
- Tons burthen: 2,900 (bm)
- Length: 216 ft (66 m) (gun deck)
- Installed power: Boilers; 2,275 ihp (1,696 kW)
- Propulsion: 1 shaft; 1 single-expansion steam engine
- Speed: 10.9 knots (20.2 km/h; 12.5 mph)
- Complement: 830
- Armament: 89 guns; Lower gun deck: 32 × 8 in (203 mm) shell guns; Upper gun deck: 34 × 32 pdr guns; Forecastle & Quarterdeck: 22 × 32 pdr guns + 1 × 68 pdr gun

HMS Trafalgar was a 120-gun, three-deck, first rate, broadened Caledonia-class ship of the line built for the Royal Navy during the 1830s. Completed in 1842, the ship remained in ordinary until 1845. She served in the Experimental Squadrons in 1845 and 1846 as well the Channel Squadron and the Mediterranean Fleet. Trafalgar participated in the Crimean War of 1854–1856 against the Russian Empire, including the Bombardment of Sevastopol in late 1854. The ship was razeed and converted into a two-deck, screw-powered, 89-gun, second rate in 1858–1859. She was assigned as a guard ship in Scotland and Ireland in the late 1860s. Trafalgar served as a sea-going training ship for naval cadets in 1870–1872; she was recommissioned in 1873 and renamed Boscawen as a stationary boys' training ship in Portland Harbour. The ship was sold for scrap in 1906.

== Description ==
The Caledonia class was an improved version of HMS Hibernia with additional freeboard to allow them to fight all their guns in heavy weather. The broadened sub-class had their beam increased to improve their ability to carry the heavier weight of their new armament of all 32-pounder guns. Trafalgar measured 205 feet 6 inches (62.6 m) on the gun deck and 170 feet 5 inches (51.9 m) on the keel. She had a beam of 55 feet 8 inches (17 m), a depth of hold of 23 feet 3 inches (7.1 m), a light draught of 18 feet 3 inches (5.56 m) and had a tonnage of 2,721 32/94 tons burthen. Her crew numbered 820 officers and ratings in peacetime and 900 in wartime. Trafalgar had three masts and was ship rigged.

The ship was armed with 120 muzzle-loading, smoothbore guns that consisted of thirty 32-pounder (56 cwt) guns (Note: "Cwt" is the abbreviation for hundredweight, 56 cwt referring to the weight of the gun.) and two 8 in (203 mm) (65 cwt), 68-pounder shell guns on her lower gun deck, thirty-two 32-pounder (55 cwt) guns and two 8-inch shell guns on her middle gun deck and thirty-four 32-pounders on her upper gun deck. Her forecastle and quarterdeck carried a total of six 32-pounders and fourteen short 32-pounder guns between them.

=== Figurehead ===
The ship's figurehead was a bust of Lord Nelson made by Hellyer & Sons in 1840. Preserved after the ship was broken up in 1906, the figurehead formed part of the HMS Ganges collection, until it was transferred to Portsmouth in 1976. Accessioned into the then Royal Naval Museum collection in 1984, it was restored by Phil Hudson and Richard Hunter in 2011. The figurehead can be seen outside at the National Museum of the Royal Navy in Portsmouth.

=== Conversion ===
After the Crimean War, the naval arms race in screw-powered ships of the line between Britain and France resumed. In mid-1858 Captain Baldwin Wake Walker, Surveyor of the Navy, estimated that Britain would have 36 battleships to France's 40 by the end of 1859. He persuaded the Admiralty to authorize the cutting down and conversion of the 120-gun first rates of the Caledonia and Nelson classes into steam-powered second rates based on the successful conversion of the second rate London. Trafalgar was ordered to be converted in mid-1858. She was lengthened at the stern to 216 feet (65.8 m) at the gun deck and 183 feet 4 inches (55.9 m) at the keel. These changes modestly increased her tons burthen to 2,900 and gave her a displacement of 3,850 long tons (3,910 t). The ship was fitted with a two-cylinder, single-expansion steam engine of 500-nominal horsepower that was built by Maudslay, Sons and Field. Her boilers provided enough steam to give the ship a speed of 10.9 knots (20.2 km/h; 12.5 mph) during her sea trials on the Thames River on 12 July 1859 from 2,275 indicated horsepower (1,696 kW). To reduce drag and improve performance under sail, the ship could hoist her propeller into the hull and retract the telescoping funnel.

The lower gun deck armament of the converted ships consisted of thirty-two 8-inch shell guns while the upper gun deck had thirty-four 32-pounders of 56 cwt. The combined armament of the forecastle and quarterdeck totalled twenty-two 32-pounders (42 cwt) and a single 68-pounder (95 cwt) pivot gun.

== Construction and career ==
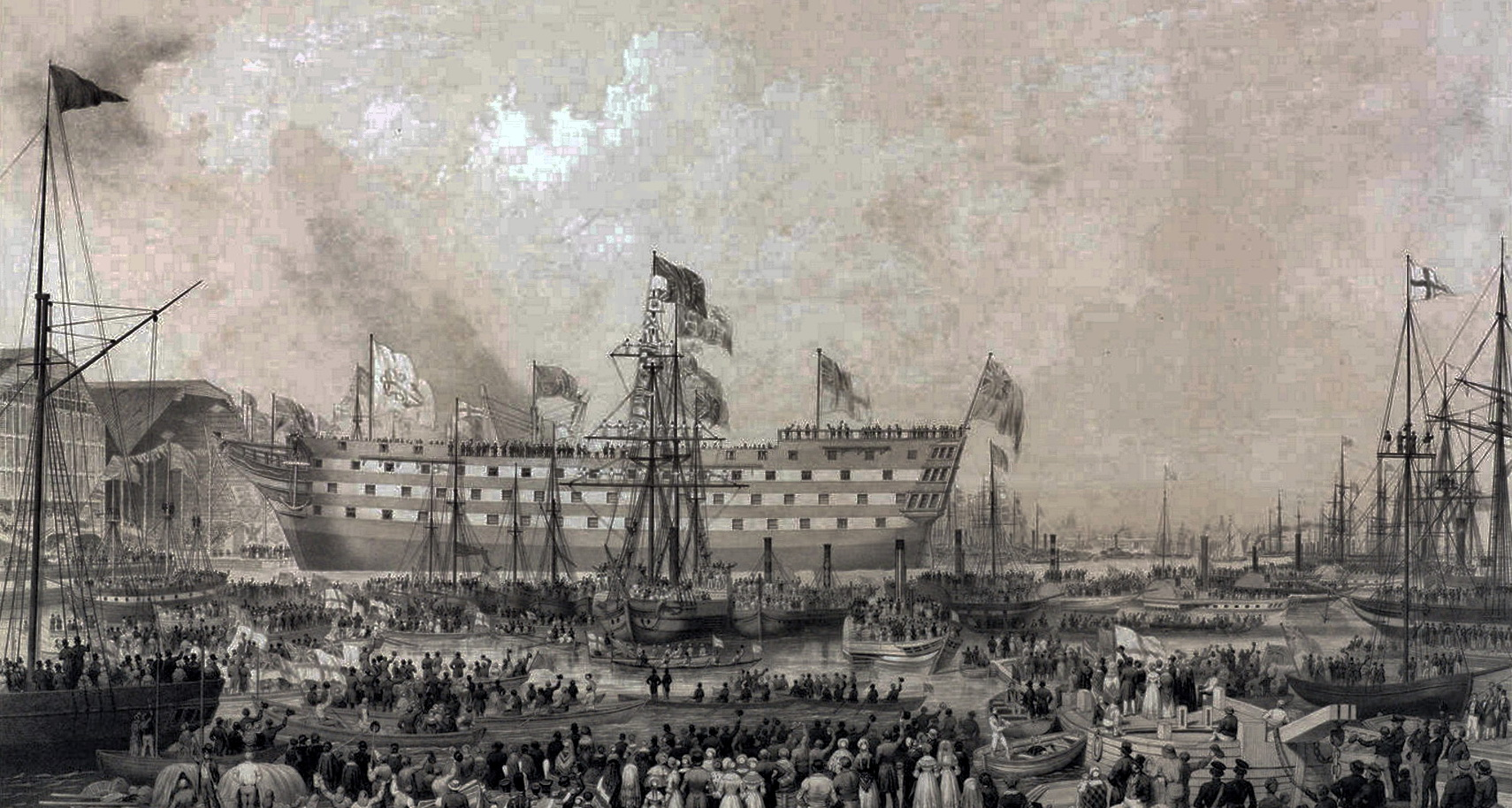
Launching of Trafalgar at Woolwich Dockyard, 1841

Named after the British victory at the Battle of Trafalgar in 1805, Trafalgar was the second ship of her name to serve in the Royal Navy. She was ordered on 22 February 1825, laid down at Woolwich Dockyard in December 1829, and launched on 21 June 1841 by Vice-Admiral Horatio Nelson's niece Charlotte, Lady Bridport, at the request of Queen Victoria, who with Prince Albert also attended the launch. "Five hundred people were on board the ship at the time of her launch, of whom 100 had been at the battle. It was estimated 500,000 people came to watch the event and the Thames was covered for miles with all manner of boats." Trafalgar was completed at Sheerness Dockyard on 6 October 1842 and immediately placed in ordinary. She was refitted as an "Advanced ship" in October 1844 so she could be activated more quickly, which meant that all of her guns were aboard and more of her masts were fitted; the rest of her rigging and stores were in a designated warehouse.

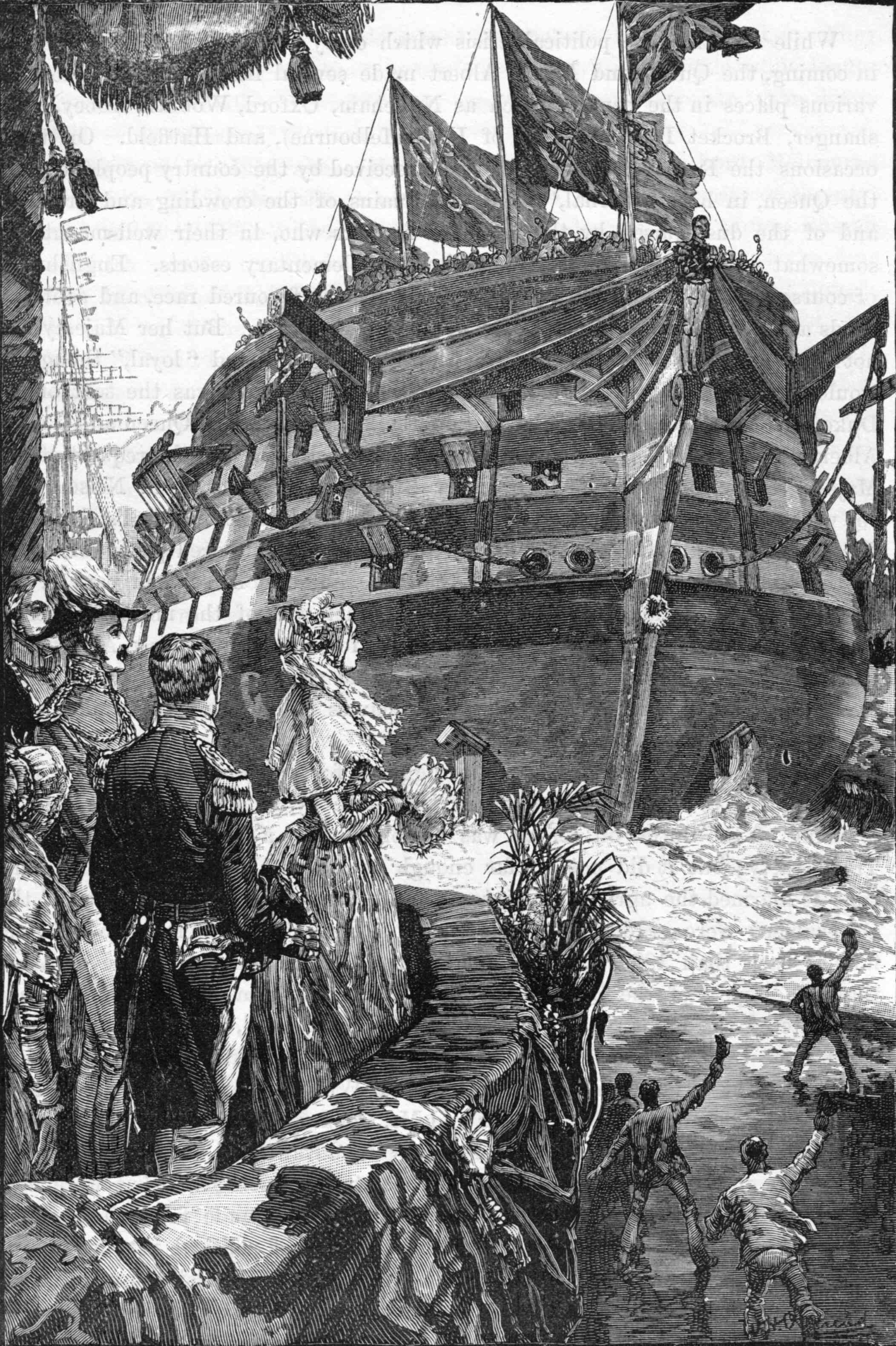
Trafalgar, launched by Lady Bridport, niece of Lord Nelson, accompanied by Queen Victoria

The ship was commissioned by Captain William Martin on 30 January 1845 and served as the flagship of Vice-Admiral John Chambers White, Commander-in-Chief, The Nore from that date until his death on 4 April. Vice-Admiral Edward King hoisted his flag aboard on 18 April. She was detached to serve in the Experimental Squadron in 1845 and 1846 where she participated in sailing trials that showed Trafalgar and Rodney were the best performers in head seas. Martin was relieved by Captain John Nott on 18 October 1846 and assigned to the Channel Squadron the following year. The ship became the flagship of Rear-Admiral Francis Collier at Lisbon, Portugal, in mid-1847 and was then reassigned to the Mediterranean Fleet in October. Captain Charles Hope replaced Nott on 11 January 1848 and Trafalgar was paid off on 30 June at Sheerness. The ship was recommissioned on 27 June 1850 by Captain Montagu Stopford while being refitted for sea duty from July 1850 to July 1851. Captain Henry Grenville assumed command on 21 July and she was assigned to the Mediterranean Fleet.

During the Crimean War, Trafalgar served in the Black Sea. She contributed sailors to a landing party that assisted Turkish forces at Roustchouk (modern Ruse, Bulgaria), building a pontoon bridge and manning Turkish gunboats on the Danube River, in July–August 1854. The following month, the ship offloaded some of her 32-pounder and 8-inch guns and their crews to serve as siege artillery during the siege of Sevastopol. Trafalgar also contributed other crewmen and Royal Marines to the ad-hoc Naval Brigade, losing 2 men killed and 17 wounded of her men serving ashore. During the naval bombardment of Sevastopol on 17 October, she had to be towed into place in the line of ships about 1,600 to 1,800 yards (1,500 to 1,600 m) away from Fort Constantine. Once the bombardment began, the British ships were frequently struck by Russian shells, although Trafalgar was only lightly damaged with two crewmen wounded. Four weeks later, the ship's rudder was damaged during the Great Storm of 1854 that struck the fleet's anchorage on 14 November. Shortly afterwards, forty of her 56-cwt 32 pounders were offloaded to reinforce the army's siege train.

Walker ordered that Trafalgar be cut down one deck and converted to screw propulsion on 10 August 1858 and work began six days later. She was undocked on 21 March 1859, commissioned by Captain Edward Fanshawe on 9 June and completed on 14 August for service with the Channel Squadron. Captain John Dickson relieved Fanshawe on 2 April 1861 and was relieved in his turn by Captain Thomas Baillie with the ship assigned to the Mediterranean Fleet. Captain Henry Mason replaced Baillie in command of the ship on 8 May 1863. She was paid off on 28 February 1864 at Sheerness. Trafalgar was recommissioned the following day for service as a guard ship at Leith by Captain Charles Schomberg. He was relieved by Captain John Borlase in March 1865, who was replaced by Captain George Hancock on 16 May. She was paid off on 15 June 1867. The ship was recommissioned by Captain Edward Barnard on 15 November to serve as the guard ship at Lough Swilly until paid off on 20 November 1869. Trafalgar was recommissioned by Captain Thomas Lethbridge on 17 August at Portsmouth as a seagoing naval cadet training ship before being paid off on 8 June 1872.

Recommissioned as a boy's training ship in Portland Harbour by Commander Alfred Markham on 25 February 1873, she was renamed Boscawen sometime that year, after Admiral Boscawen. The ship was sold to Castle's Shipbreaking on 10 July 1906 to be scrapped at Charlton, London.
