= Nathaniel Bowden-Smith =

Royal Navy Admiral (1838–1921)

Admiral Sir Nathaniel Bowden-Smith KCB
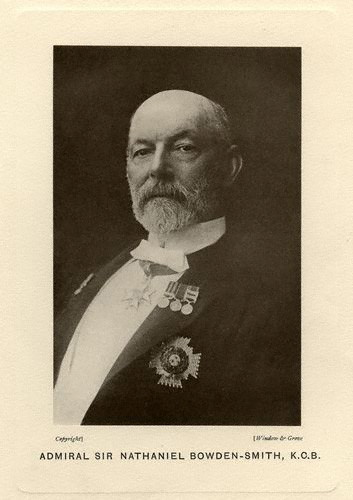
- Born: 21 January 1838; Brockenhurst, Hampshire, England
- Died: 28 April 1921 (aged 83); London, England
- Military career
- Allegiance: United Kingdom
- Branch: Royal Navy
- Service years: 1852–1903
- Rank: Admiral
- Commands: HMS Narcissus; HMS Undaunted; HMS Hercules; HMS Amethyst; HMS Britannia; Australia Station; Nore Command
- Conflicts: Second Anglo-Burmese War; Crimean War; Second Opium War
- Awards: Knight Commander of the Order of the Bath

Admiral Sir Nathaniel Bowden-Smith KCB (21 January 1838 – 28 April 1921) was a Royal Navy officer who served as Commander-in-Chief, The Nore.

== Naval career ==
Bowden-Smith joined the Royal Navy in 1852. He took part in the Second Anglo-Burmese War later that year and in the Crimean War in 1855.

He was present at the Battle of Fatshan Creek in 1857. He participated in the first and second attacks on the Peiho Forts in 1858 and 1959 during the Second Opium War. He was badly injured in the arm during the failed assault on the forts in the latter one.

Promoted to captain in 1872 he commanded the frigates HMS Narcissus and HMS Undaunted, the battleship HMS Hercules and the corvette HMS Amethyst. He went on to command the training ship HMS Britannia in 1883 and to be Commander-in-chief, Australia Station in 1892 and Commander-in-Chief, The Nore in 1899, with the full rank of admiral on 16 October 1899. He retired from the Navy in January 1903.

In 1905 commenting on the Battle of Port Arthur he said the "siege was distinguished by the most daring and persistent attacks [by the Japanese] and the most heroic defence [by the Russians] on record."

== Family ==
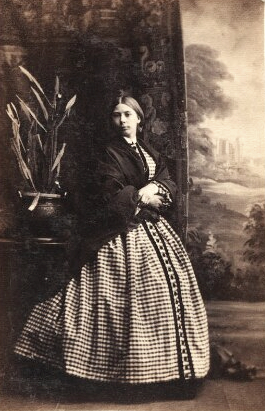
Emily Cecilia Sandeman, 1861 photograph

In 1873 Bowden-Smith married Emily Cecilia Sandeman. She was a sister of Albert George Sandeman, and daughter of George Glas Sandeman, of the Sandeman wine importers, a descendant of Robert Sandeman and John Glas, and his wife Elizabeth Forster. The couple had three daughters.

Of the daughters, Alice Georgette Bowden-Smith (1873–1945) went in 1910 to Beijing with Dorothea Soothill. She became the principal of the Peihua Girls School there.

== Honours and awards ==
- 22 June 1897 - To celebrate the Diamond Jubilee of Queen Victoria Vice-Admiral Nathaniel Bowden-Smith is appointed a Knight Commander of the Order of the Bath.

Military offices
Preceded by Lord Charles Montagu Douglas Scott	Commander-in-Chief, Australia Station; 1892–1894	Succeeded by Cyprian Bridge
Preceded by Sir Charles Hotham	Commander-in-Chief, The Nore; 1899–1900	Succeeded by Sir William Kennedy
