= HMS Inconstant (1868) =

British screw frigate

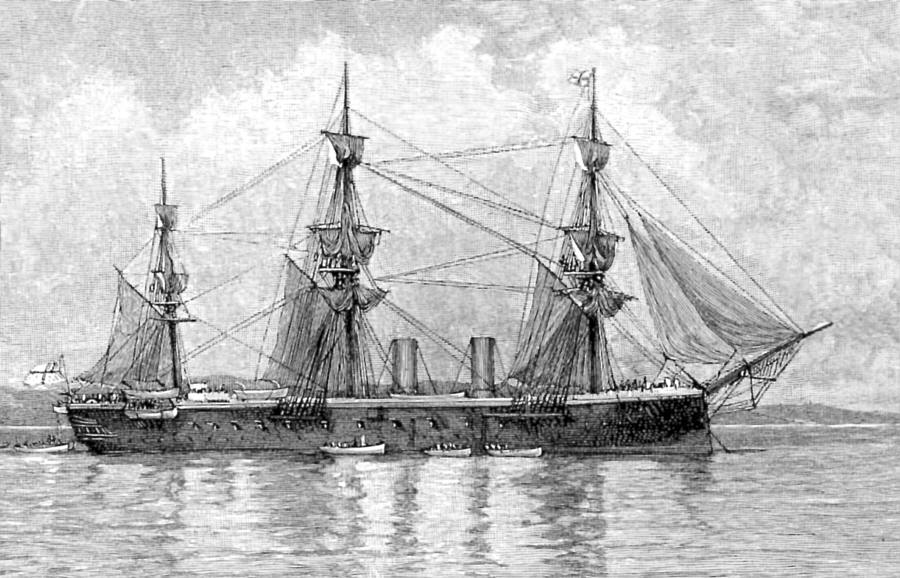
- HMS Inconstant about 1885

Class overview
- Succeeded by: HMS Shah
- Completed: 1
- Scrapped: 1

History

United Kingdom
- Name: Inconstant
- Builder: Pembroke Dockyard
- Laid down: 27 November 1866
- Launched: 12 November 1868
- Commissioned: 14 August 1869
- Renamed: Impregnable II, June 1906; Defiance IV, January 1922; Defiance II, December 1930
- Reclassified: Hulked, 1897; Training ship, June 1906
- Fate: Sold for scrap, September 1955; broken up in Belgium, 4 April 1956

General characteristics
- Type: Unarmored steam frigate
- Displacement: 5,782 long tons (5,875 t)
- Tons burthen: 4,066 bm
- Length: 337 ft 4 in (102.8 m) (p/p)
- Beam: 50 ft 4 in (15.3 m)
- Draught: 25 ft 6 in (7.8 m)
- Installed power: 7,360 ihp (5,490 kW); 11 boilers
- Propulsion: 1 shaft; 1 × trunk steam engine
- Sail plan: Ship rig
- Speed: 16 knots (30 km/h; 18 mph)
- Range: 2,780 nmi (5,150 km; 3,200 mi) at 10 knots (19 km/h; 12 mph)
- Complement: 600
- Armament: 10 × RML 9 in (229 mm) rifled muzzle-loading guns; 6 × RML 7 in (178 mm) guns

HMS Inconstant was an unarmored, iron-hulled, screw frigate built for the Royal Navy in the late 1860s. Upon completion in 1869, she was the fastest warship in the world and was assigned to the Channel Squadron. Two years later the ship was transferred to the Detached Squadron for a brief time before she was paid off into reserve in 1872. Inconstant was recommissioned in 1880 for service with the Flying Squadron that circumnavigated the world in 1880–82. On the return voyage, the ship was diverted to Egypt during the Anglo-Egyptian War of 1882 and played a minor role supporting operations ashore. She was reduced to reserve again after her return and was served as an accommodation ship in 1897. Inconstant was hulked in 1904 and became a training ship in 1906. She continued in that role, under a variety of names, until she was sold for scrap in 1955 and subsequently broken up, the second-to-last surviving Pembroke-built warship in existence.

== Design and description ==
Inconstant was the first of an intended six fast, unarmoured, iron-hulled, frigates designed by the British Admiralty's Chief Constructor, Sir Edward Reed, in response to the fast, wooden American Wampanoag-class frigates. Only three were built, however, as the American ships proved to be flawed enough to pose no real threat and the British ships were very expensive. The ship was 337 feet 4 inches (102.8 m) long between perpendiculars, had a beam of 50 feet 3 inches (15.3 m), and a draught of 25 feet 6 inches (7.8 m). Inconstant displaced 5,780 long tons (5,870 t) and had a tonnage of 4,066 tons burthen. She carried a complement of 600 officers and ratings. To reduce biofouling, her iron hull was sheathed in two layers of oak 3 inches (76 mm) thick that was covered by a layer of copper. Inconstant was a good seaboat and a steady gun platform.

The ship had a single John Penn and Sons two-cylinder trunk steam engine that drove a 23-foot (7.0 m) propeller. The engine used steam provided by 11 boilers with a working pressure of 30 psi (207 kPa; 2 kgf/cm^{2}). Inconstant reached a speed of 16.2 knots (30.0 km/h; 18.6 mph) from 7,360 indicated horsepower (5,490 kW) during her sea trials and was the fastest warship afloat when completed. The ship once sustained an average speed of 15.5 knots (28.7 km/h; 17.8 mph) for 24 hours. She carried a maximum of 750 long tons (760 t) of coal, enough to steam 2,780 nautical miles (5,150 km; 3,200 mi) at 10 knots (19 km/h; 12 mph).

Inconstant was ship-rigged with three masts and a sail area of 26,655 square feet (2,476 m^{2}). She proved to be excellent under sail, reaching a maximum speed of 13.5 knots (25.0 km/h; 15.5 mph), one of only two warships ever to reach this speed under sail and 16 knots with steam. To improve her performance under sail, her propeller could be hoisted into the hull and her funnels lowered to reduce drag.

When completed the ship was more heavily armed than all but two of the twenty-four British ironclads afloat. Inconstant's main armament consisted of ten rifled muzzle-loading (RML) 9-inch (229 mm) guns on the main deck in the traditional broadside layout. The 9-inch shells weighed 254 pounds (115.2 kg) and were rated with the ability to penetrate 11.3 inches (287 mm) of wrought-iron armour. Her secondary armament of six RML 7-inch (178 mm) guns was mounted on the upper deck, with two guns positioned in the bow as chase guns. The guns fired a 112-pound (51 kg) shell that could pierce 7.7 inches (196 mm) of armour.

== Construction and career ==
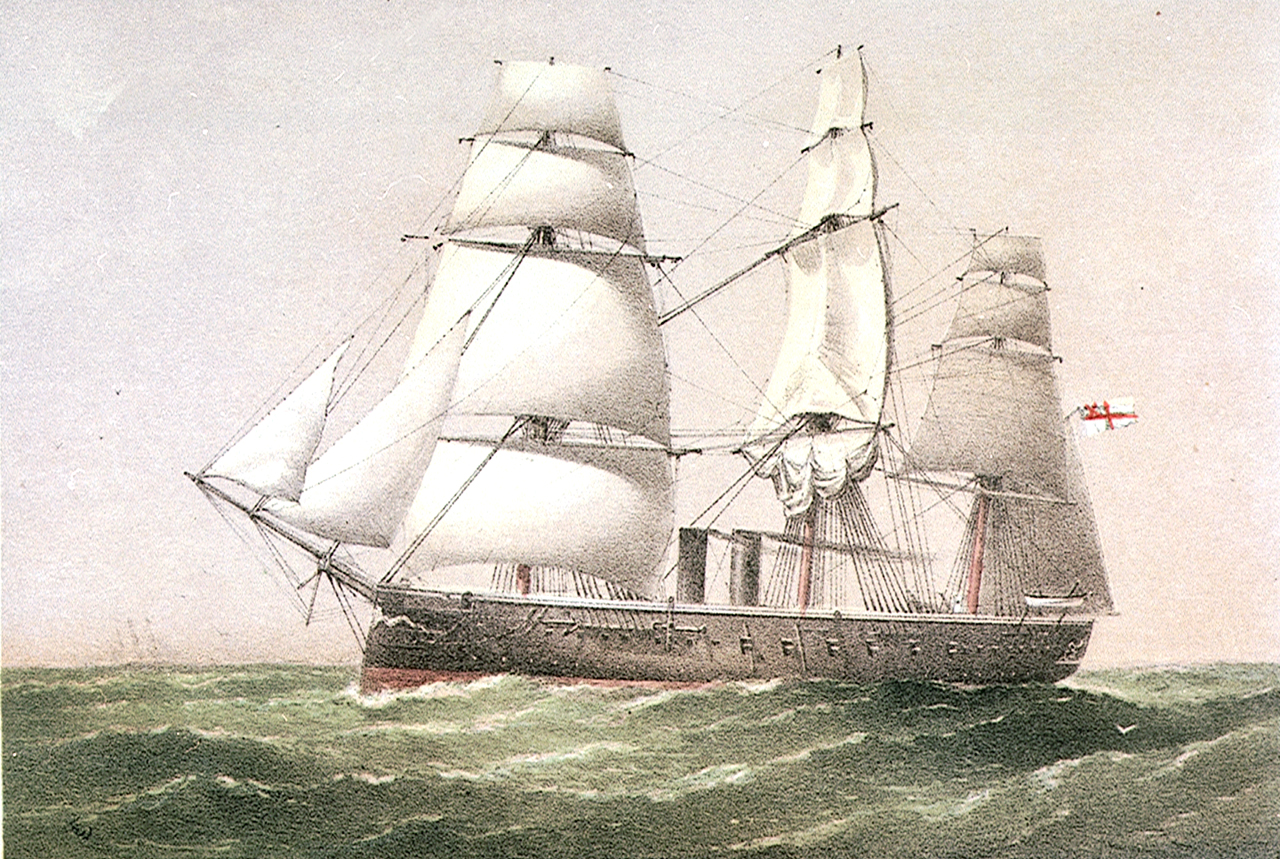
Inconstant in 1872

Inconstant, the fifth ship of her name to serve in the Royal Navy, was laid down on 27 November 1866 at Pembroke Dockyard, Wales. The ship was launched on 25 March 1872 by Lady Muriel Campbell, daughter of John Campbell, 2nd Earl Cawdor. Inconstant was transferred to Portsmouth Dockyard to finish fitting out and was commissioned on 12 August 1869 by Captain Elphinstone D'Oyly D'Auvergne Aplin for duty with the Channel Squadron. He was relieved by Captain Charles Waddilove on 13 September 1870. The following year the ship was assigned to the Detached Squadron, commanded by Rear-Admiral Frederick Seymour, which visited ports in Scandinavia after Inconstant joined them at Gibraltar, finally arriving at Spithead on 11 October 1871. The ship was paid off in 1872 and spent the next eight years in reserve.

She was recommissioned in 1880 and was commanded by Captain Lord Walter Kerr from 5 February to 11 March. During this time, Inconstant served as the flagship of Vice-Admiral Seymour of the Mediterranean Fleet as she ferried replacement crews to that fleet. From August 1880 to October 1882, Inconstant was assigned to the reconstituted Detached Squadron, this time as the flagship, first of Rear-Admiral Richard Meade, 4th Earl of Clanwilliam until he was got sick in Hong Kong, and then from 6 December 1881 to 17 October 1882 of Rear-Admiral Sir Francis Sullivan. Inconstant's captain at this time was Captain Charles Penrose-Fitzgerald. The Detached Squadron left Spithead on 17 October 1880 to circumnavigate the world and returned two years later. It is claimed that on 11 July 1881 (or 11 June 1881), Prince George of Wales (later King George V of the United Kingdom) sighted a phantom ship whilst aboard Inconstant between Melbourne and Sydney. Two other ships, Tourmaline and Cleopatra, also reported seeing the phantom ship. Just after arriving in the Falkland Islands, the squadron was ordered to Simonstown, South Africa, for possible service in the First Boer War of 1880–81, but hostilities had already ended by the time that it arrived. On the return voyage, the frigate caught fire; it was stopped by flooding all of the after compartments. Shortly afterward, the squadron was diverted to Egypt after the start of the Anglo-Egyptian War of 1882; they arrived after the Bombardment of Alexandria on 11 July and some of Inconstant's crew were landed to participate in operations ashore.

The ship was reduced to reserve again after their return on 16 October 1882. She became an accommodation ship for the overflow from the barracks at Devonport in 1897. Inconstant was taken out of service in 1904 and became a gunnery training ship in June 1906, assigned to the boy's training establishment Impregnable. She was renamed Impregnable III in 1907, then Defiance IV in January 1922 after she was transferred to the torpedo training school at Plymouth, Defiance, and then Defiance II in December 1930. The ship was sold for scrap in September 1955 and arrived at the breaker's yard in Belgium on 4 April 1956 for demolition, when she was the second-to-last Welsh-built naval vessel afloat.

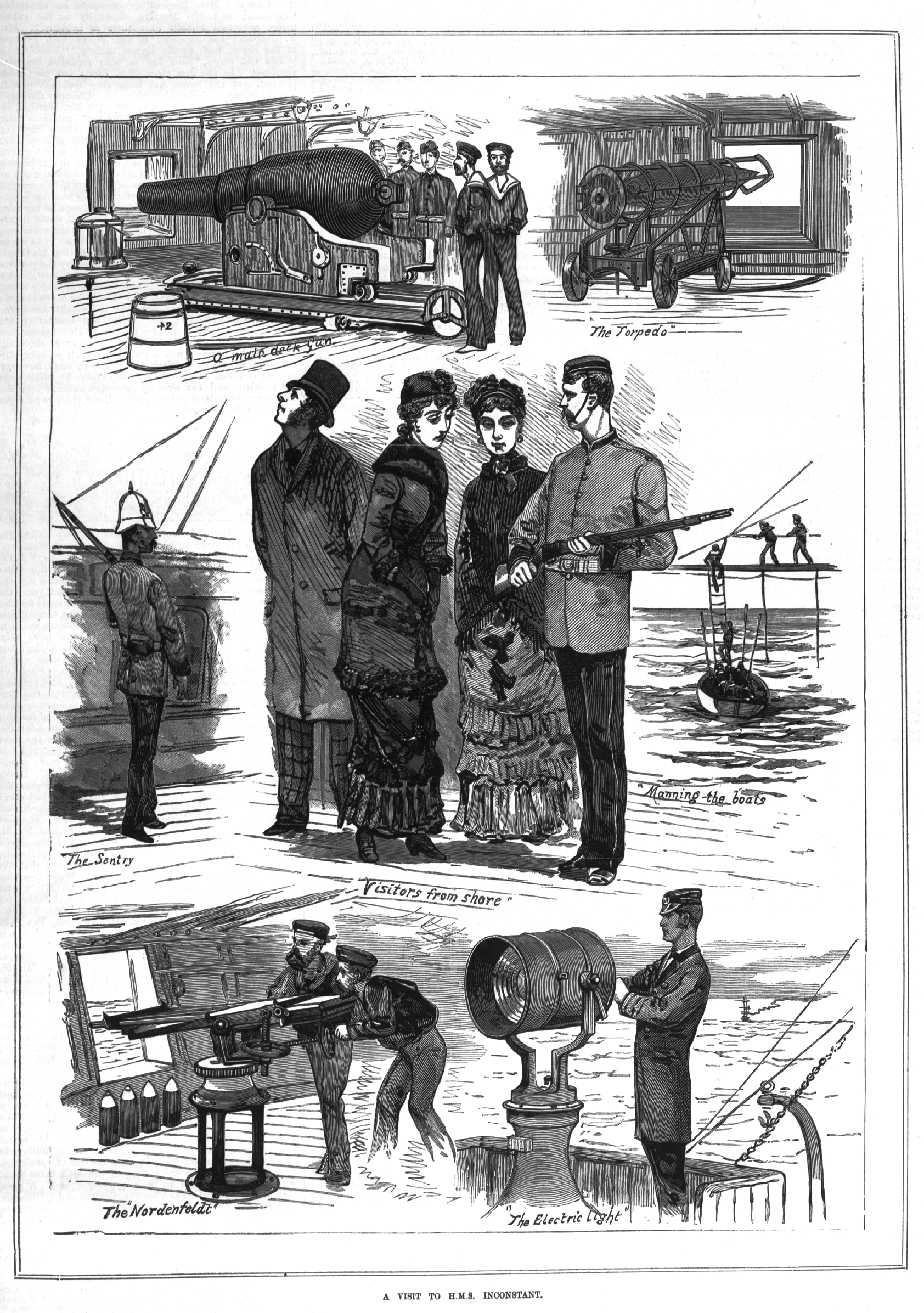
Illustrations of scenes aboard ship at Melbourne in June 1881
