= Brightlingsea Station =

Brightlingsea Naval Base
- Active: 1914-1921, 1939-1945
- Country: United Kingdom
- Branch: Royal Navy
- Type: Naval station
- Part of: Royal Navy
- Garrison/HQ: HMS Wallaroo (1914-1916); HMS City of Perth (1916-1939); HMS Nemo (1939-1945)

Brighlingsea Naval Base was an installation of the British Royal Navy located at Brightlingsea, Essex, on the East Coast of England. In both wars it was part of the Nore Command, which had its HQ at Chatham, and in the Second was part of Harwich Sub-Command. It existed from late 1914 to 1921, and from early 1940 to 1947,

Brightlingsea is a coastal town in the Tendring district of Essex, England. It is situated between Colchester and Clacton-on-Sea, at the mouth of the River Colne, on Brightlingsea Creek.

== History ==
51.81°N 1.03°E In World War I Brightlingsea naval base was in charge of the protective anti-torpedo net barrier around the Swin Anchorage, used at various times by the 3rd Battle Squadron, the Dover Patrol, and other naval units. It installed, maintained and finally dismantled the booms and nets, patrolled around them, and also patrolled the local Essex river estuaries and coastline, using trawlers, drifters, and Motor Launches (MLs). After mid-1916 it was also the base for the steam gunboat HMS Cockchafer. The local shipyards also maintained its craft and some of those from the Dover Patrol. Rear-Admiral C L Napier was in command from late 1914 till Spring 1916, then Commander R Hartland Mahan replaced him. Including the old light cruiser HMS Wallaroo which was attached in 1915–1916, manpower varied from about 300 to 500. The shore base was initially named HMS Wallaroo (after the ship), then City of Perth (after a net drifter).

Unconnected with the Navy was the Army School of Military (Field) Engineering, and from Summer 1916 the Australian Engineer Training Depot (AETD), with a combined strength of up to 1260 personnel.

In early 1940 naval personnel and craft from HMS Vernon, Portsmouth, used the harbour to test the newly-invented LL magnetic mine sweep. That June, after their departure, the Navy set up the shore base HMS Nemo, for Essex coast auxiliary patrol. In the autumn minesweeping drifters and training landing craft were attached, together with naval air-sea rescue craft, and personnel for operating and guarding estuary observation minefields. Manpower ashore and afloat varied from about 200 to 600. A separate Coastal Forces equipping unit was also attached (from 1941), which used the local shipyards to equip and test-run many hundreds of MLs, MTBs and MGBs. The same shipyards also serviced and repaired many such craft from other bases, besides building 16 in the case of Aldous's yard. In 1942 landing craft training was separated out under HMS Helder, which moored its craft (up to 90) in the Creek but had its shore HQ opposite at St Osyth.

== Senior naval officer ==
The station was administered initially by the Rear-Admiral, Brightlinsea and later by the Senior Naval Officer, Brighlingsea

Name	Flag Ship
Brighlingsea Station	HMS Wallaroo (1914-1915), HMS City of Perth (1916-1939), HMS Nemo (1940-1945)

=== Rear-Admiral, Brightlingsea ===
Included:

	Rank	Flag	Name	Term	Notes/Ref
Rear-Admiral, Brightlingsea
1	Rear-Admiral	Rear-Admiral - Royal Navy	Charles Lionel Napier	November 1914 - May 1916	

=== Naval Officer-in-Charge, Brightlingsea ===
:Incomplete list of post holder included:

	Rank	Flag	Name	Term	Notes/Ref
Naval Officer-in-Charge, Brightlingsea
1	Captain		J. P. Landon	1916 - 1919	
2	Commander		Ernest E. M. Betts, CBE	1919 - 4 February 1920	
3	Vice-Admiral	Vice-Admiral - Royal Navy	Gordon Campbell	1 June - July 1940	(retired)
4	Captain		Arthur Henniker-Heaton	July 1940 - May 1942	(retired)
5	Captain		J.P. Farquharson	May 1942	(retired)
6	Captain		C.C. Bell	June - December 1942	(retired)
7	Captain		J.P. Landon	December 1942 - May 1945	(retired)

== Sources ==
- Houterman, J.N. "Royal Navy Nore Command 1939-1945: Brighlingsea". unithistories.com. Houterman and Koppes.
- Navy lists, Quarterly. London: H.M. Stationery Office. October 1915.
- The Navy List. London, England: H. M. Stationery Office. October 1919.
- The Navy List. London, England: H. M. Stationery Office. January 1920.
- The Navy List. London, England: H. M. Stationery Office. October 1944.
- Reebeck, Amanda. "The Anzacs of Brightlingsea: The Australian War Memorial". awm.gov.au. Australian War Memorial.
- Shipbuilding & shipping record: (1919), a journal of shipbuilding, marine engineering, dock, harbours & shipping (Volume 14).
- Watson, (2015), Dr Graham. "British Admiralty, Shore Establishments, Fleets and Station, World War 1". naval-history.net. Gordon Smith.
- J P Foynes "Brightlingsea & the Great War" and "Under the White Ensign", based mainly on National Archive Admiralty files, and interviews.
- J P Foynes "The Australians at Brightlingsea 1916-1919", based mainly on Australian Engineer War Diaries and Personnel Files at Australian National Archives and Australian War Museum, plus photo-collections and family research.
