= Charles Frederick Corbett =

Royal Navy Admiral (1867–1955)

Admiral Charles Frederick Corbett CB MVO
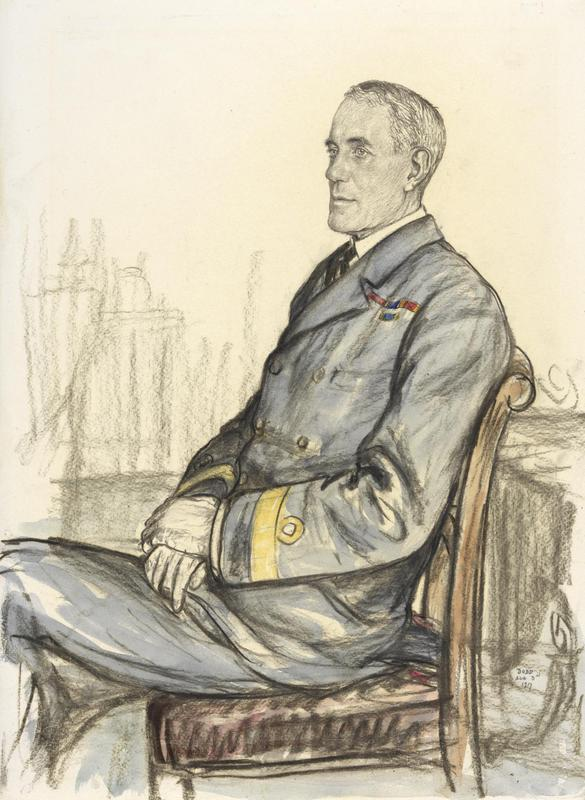
- Born: 21 November 1867
- Died: 29 January 1955 (aged 87)
- Allegiance: United Kingdom
- Branch: Royal Navy
- Service years: 1881–1922
- Rank: Admiral

Admiral Charles Frederick Corbett, CB, MVO (21 November 1867 – 29 January 1955) was a Royal Navy officer.

== Biography ==
The son of Admiral Sir John Corbett, Charles Corbett entered HMS Britannia as a cadet in 1881.

From 1914 to 1916, he was captain of the pre-dreadnought battleship HMS Glory, during which he was appointed a CB and was commended for services relating to the evacuation of Gallipoli.

Corbett was placed on the retired list at his own request in 1922. He was promoted vice-admiral on the retired list in 1924 and admiral on the retired list in 1928.
