= HMS Falcon (1854) =

Sloop of the Royal Navy

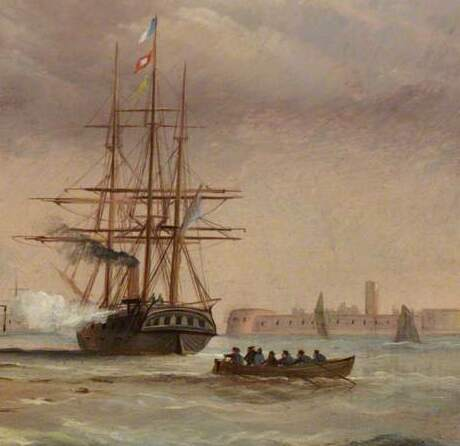
- Falcon at Portsmouth Point, Spithead in 1859

History

United Kingdom
- Name: HMS Falcon
- Ordered: 2 April 1853
- Builder: Plymouth Dockyard
- Laid down: November 1853
- Launched: 10 August 1854
- Commissioned: 30 March 1855
- Decommissioned: 1869
- Fate: Broken up at Plymouth in 1869

General characteristics
- Class & type: Cruizer-class screw sloop
- Displacement: 1,045 tons
- Tons burthen: 747 51/94 bm
- Length: 160 ft (49 m) (gundeck); 140 ft 1.75 in (42.7165 m) (keel)
- Beam: 31 ft 10 in (9.70 m)
- Depth of hold: 17 ft 6 in (5.33 m)
- Installed power: 100 nominal horsepower; 312 ihp (233 kW)
- Propulsion: Two-cylinder horizontal single-expansion steam engine; Single screw
- Sail plan: Barque-rigged
- Speed: 7.8 knots (14.4 km/h; 9.0 mph)
- Armament: 1 × 32 pdr (56 cwt) pivot gun; 16 × 32 pdr (32 cwt) carriage guns

Service record
- Commanders: Algernon Heneage

HMS Falcon was a 17-gun Royal Navy Cruizer-class sloop launched in 1854. She served in the Baltic Sea during the Crimean War and then in North America, West Africa and Australia. She was sold for breaking in 1869.

== Construction ==
Ordered on 2 April 1853, she was laid down in November the same year and launched on 10 August 1854 at Plymouth Dockyard.

== Crimean War ==
She served in the Baltic Sea during the Crimean War and participated in the blockade off the coast of Courland.

== North America station ==
She was then transferred to the North America and West Indies Station, where she served until 1857.

== West Africa ==
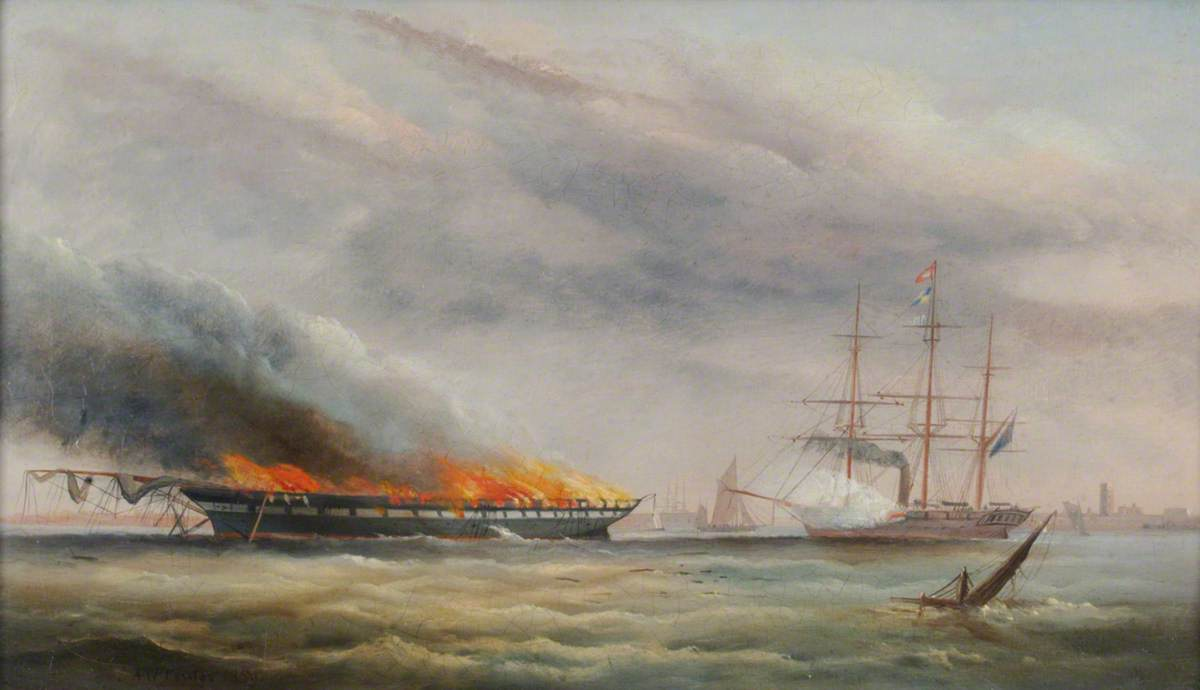
Falcon attempts to sink the burning troopship Eastern Monarch at Spithead, June 1859

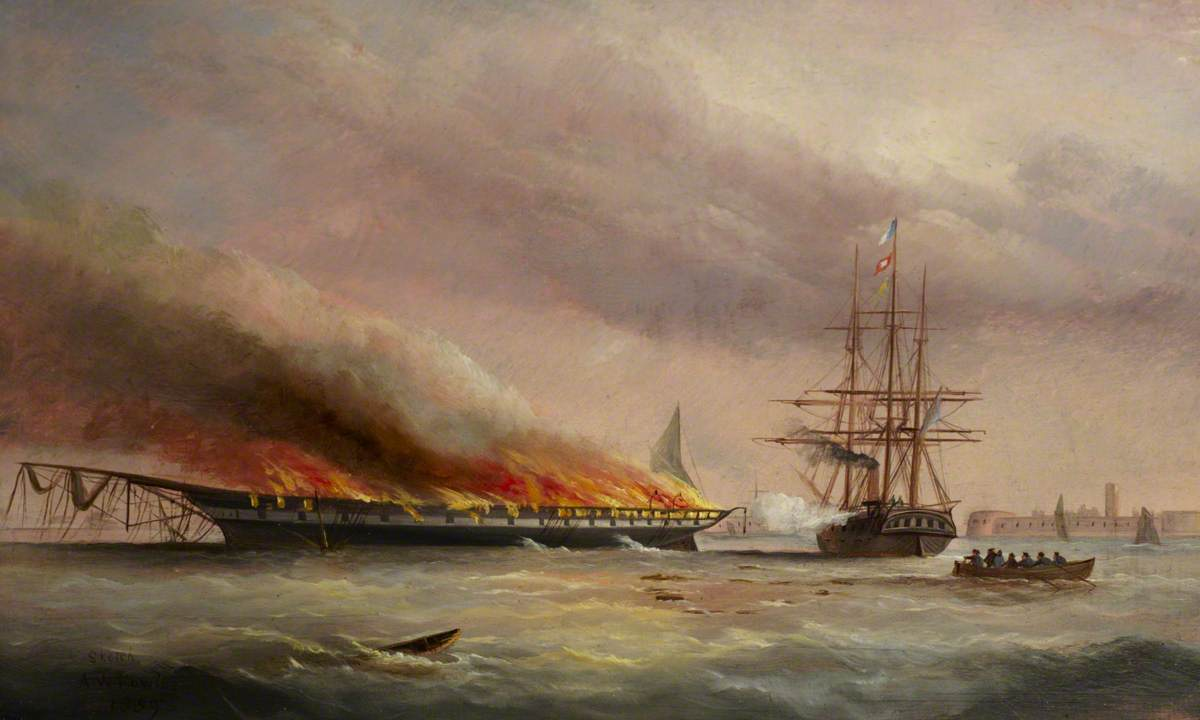
Both pictures by Arthur Wellington Fowles

She was refitted in Portsmouth in 1858, On 4 June 1859, she assisted HMS Flying Fish in rescuing survivors from the troopship Eastern Monarch, which had suffered an onboard explosion, caught fire and sank off Spithead. Falcon then served as part of the West Africa Squadron off Africa from 1859 to 1862. In 1861, Falcon was stationed off Jenkins Town, on the River Sherbro, Sierra Leone, commander Algernon Heneage. Her ship's company participated in the attack on the king of Baddiboo on the Gambia River, and the ship bombarded Saba and captured the town on 21 February 1862. The ship's crew suffered 6 killed and 15 wounded.

== Australia station ==
Refitted again in Portsmouth during 1863 before spending the rest of her active life on the Australia Station. During this period she took part in the New Zealand Wars. On 28 April 1864 she participated in the bombardment of Tai Rawhiti. The next day some of her crew took part in the attack on Gate Pā as part of the Naval Brigade. She left the Australia Station in November 1867 for England.

== Fate ==
She paid off at Woolwich on 3 October 1868 and was sold on 27 September 1869 to C. Marshall for £2046 for breaking at Plymouth.
