= Commander-in-Chief, The Nore =

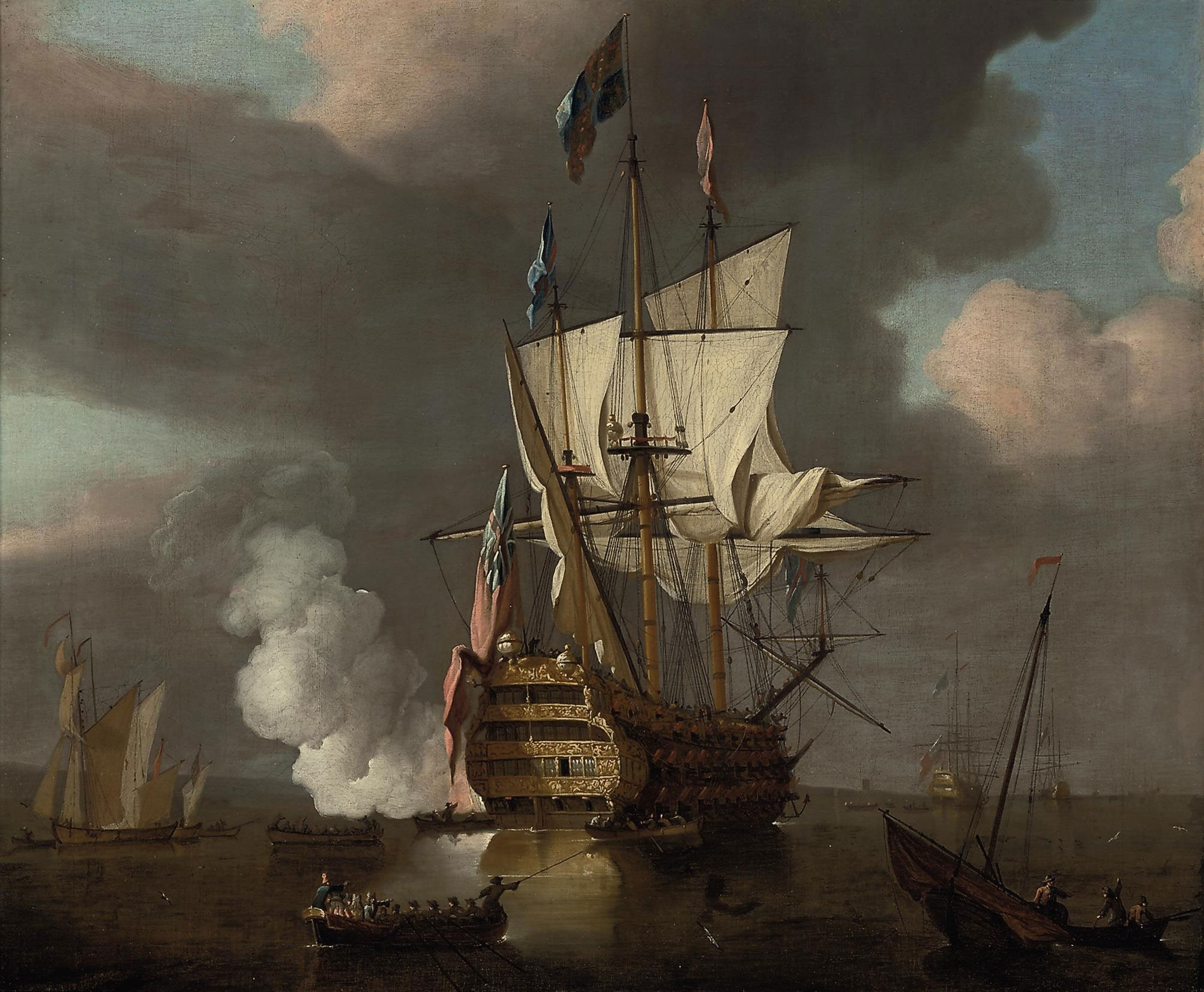
- The flagship HMS Royal Sovereign saluting at the Nore
- Active: 1695–1961
- Country: England; Great Britain; United Kingdom
- Branch: Royal Navy
- Type: Command (military formation)
- Garrison/HQ: Chatham, Kent

Commanders
- Notable commanders: John Tovey

The Commander-in-Chief, The Nore, was an operational commander of the Royal Navy. His subordinate units, establishments, and staff were sometimes informally known as the Nore Station or Nore Command. The Nore is a sandbank at the mouth of the Thames Estuary and River Medway. In due course the Commander-in-Chief became responsible for sub-commands at Chatham, London (less the Admiralty), Sheerness, Harwich and the Humber.

== History ==
The origins of the Commander-in-Chief's post can be traced to Stafford Fairborne, who in 1695 was appointed as captain of HMS London and "Commander in Chief of his Majesty's shipps in the River of Thames and the Medway".

Thereafter, and for most of the eighteenth century, appointments were only made irregularly, and often just for limited periods of time (ranging between seven and thirty days). The appointment only became permanent with the posting of Commodore George Mackenzie in 1774.

In the early 18th century the post holder was usually known as Commander-in-Chief in the Thames and Medway. In 1711 the office began to be known as Commander-in-Chief in the Thames, Medway and Nore. In 1742 Sir Charles Hardy was appointed "Commander in chief of all the ships of war in the rivers Thames and Medway, and at the buoy of the Nore", and similarly in 1745 Sir Chaloner Ogle, Admiral of the Blue, was appointed "Commander-in-Chief of HM Ships and Naval Vessels in the Rivers Thames and Medway and at the Buoy of the Nore" (as indeed was Isaac Townsend in 1752).

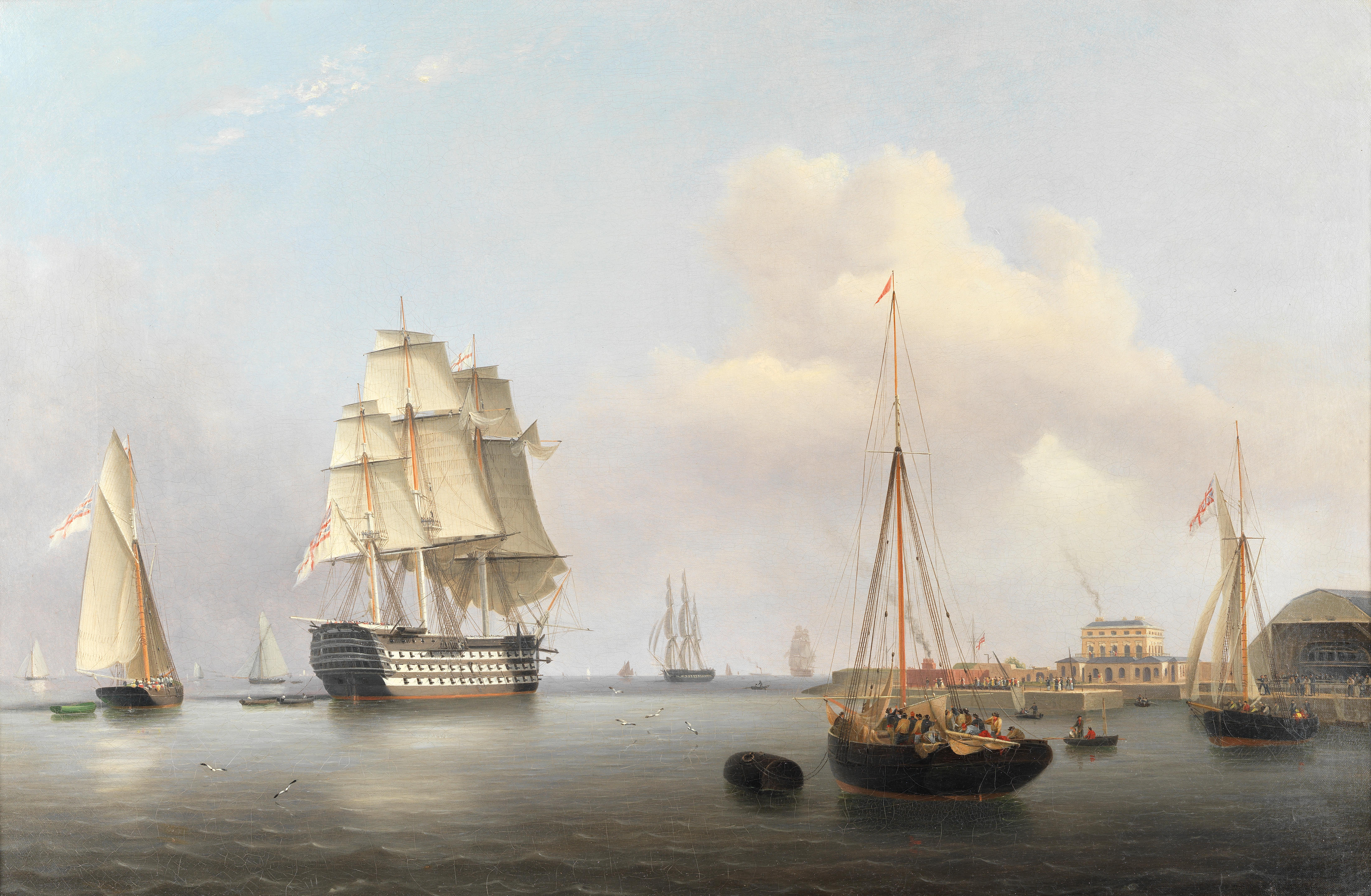
HMS Trafalgar lying off the Royal Dockyard at Sheerness (by Robert Strickland Thomas, 1845). The large house on the right with the smoking chimney is Admiralty House, Sheerness.

From 1827 the Commander-in-Chief was accommodated in Admiralty House, Sheerness, built as part of the renewal of Sheerness Dockyard. From 1834 to 1899 his appointment was sometimes known as the Commander-in-Chief at Sheerness; but otherwise by this time he was generally termed Commander-in-Chief at The Nore.

After the dissolution of the Home Fleet in 1905, remaining ships at a lesser state of readiness were split between three reserve divisions: Nore Division plus the Devonport Division and the Portsmouth Division. In 1909 the division was brought out of reserve status, and became operational as part of the 3rd and 4th Division of the Home Fleet.

In 1907 the Commander-in-Chief moved to a new Admiralty House alongside the naval barracks (HMS Pembroke) in Chatham, the Sheerness house being given over to the Commander-in-Chief, Home Fleet. The Dover Patrol, Harwich Force, and Humber Force operated in the Channel during the First World War, but were responsible to the Admiralty in London; the Nore was effectively a provider of shore support rather than a command with operational responsibilities.

In 1938 an underground Area Combined Headquarters was built close to Admiralty House to accommodate the Commander-in-Chief together with the Air Officer Commanding No. 16 Group RAF, Coastal Command, and their respective staffs; similar headquarters were built close to the other Royal Dockyards. During the Second World War, the Nore assumed great importance: it was used to guard the east coast convoys supplying the ports of North Eastern England.

During the Second World War, the Commander-in-Chief at the Nore, at Chatham, included eight sub commands, each of which usually commanded by a Flag Officer either a Rear Admiral or Vice Admiral. They included Brightlingsea station, Harwich, Humber, London (not including the Admiralty), Lowestoft, Sheerness, Southend and Yarmouth. These sub-commands were then sub-divided into Base areas usually commanded by a Naval Officer in Charge (NOIC) or a Residential Naval Officer (RNO) these included HM Naval Bases at Boston, Burnham-on-Crouch, Felixstowe, Gravesend, Grimsby, Immingham, and Queensborough.

With the onset of the Cold War, the Nore diminished in importance as the navy decreased in size. Between 1952 and 1961 the Commander-in-Chief, The Nore was double-hatted as Commander, Nore Sub-Area, of NATO's Allied Command Channel.

Cecil Hampshire writes that the appointment of Commander-in-Chief finally lapsed as part of the "Way Ahead" economies. The closing ceremony took place on 24 March 1961, when the station's Queen's Colour was formally laid up in the presence of members of the Admiralty Board, several former Commanders-in-Chief, other civilian and military figures, "..and the Commander-in-Chief of the Netherlands Home Station flying his flag in the new Dutch destroyer Limburg who had been invited to attend." The Commander-in-Chief's appointment was finally discontinued on 31 March 1961. Cecil Hampshire writes that from 1 April 1961, the area was divided between the Commander-in-Chief Portsmouth and the Flag Officer Scotland and Northern Ireland, the demarcation line being "roughly at The Wash." For purposes of administration from that date onward, the Admiral Superintendent Chatham also took the title of Flag Officer Medway.

The underground headquarters went on to serve as HMS Wildfire, a Royal Naval Reserve training and communications centre, from 1964 to 1994.

== Installations ==
=== Chatham ===
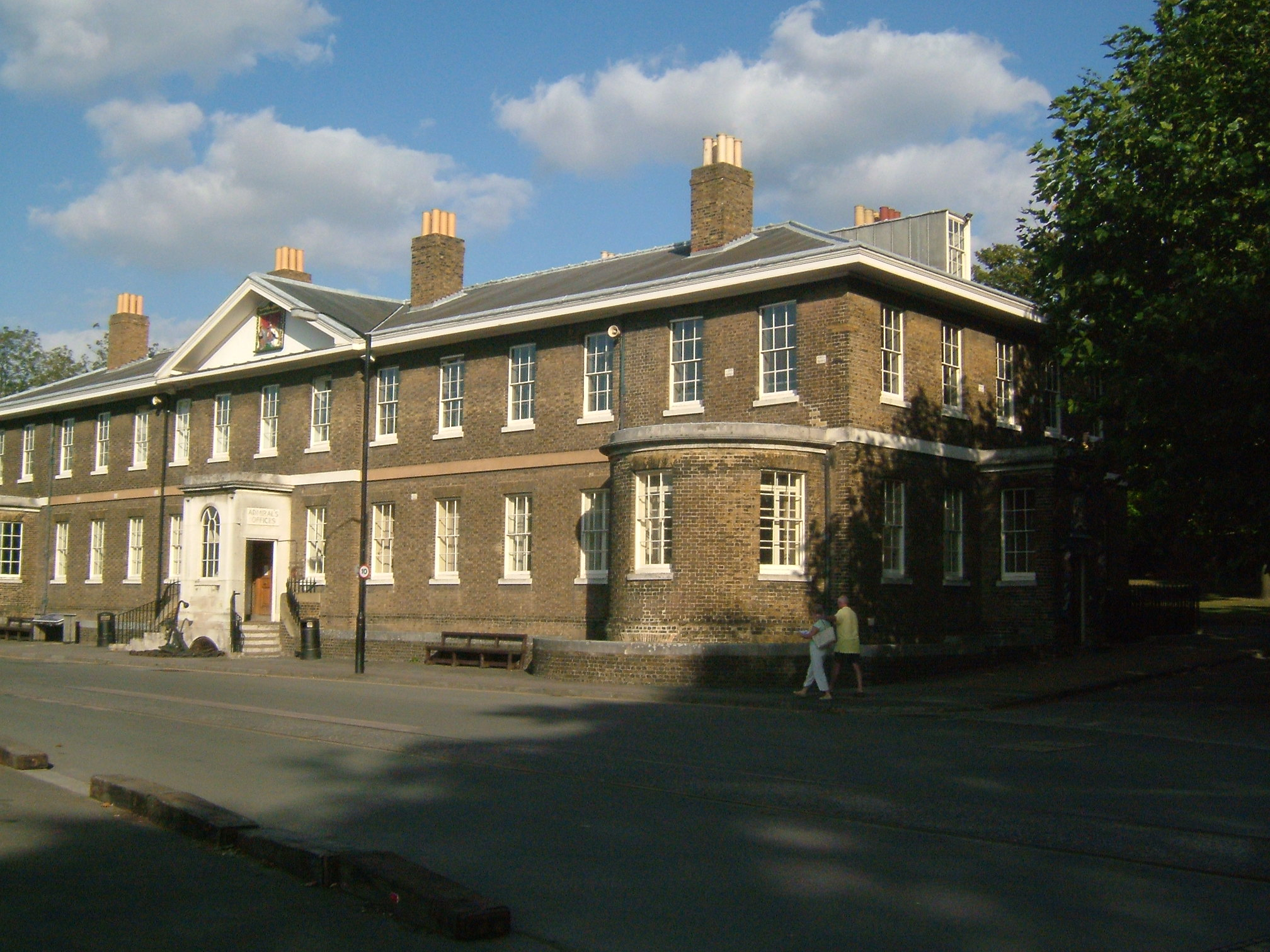
The Admiral's Offices, Chatham Dockyard

Chatham Dockyard was a Dockyard located on the River Medway in Kent. Established in Chatham in the mid-16th century, the dockyard subsequently expanded into neighbouring Gillingham. At its most extensive, in the early 20th century, two-thirds of the dockyard lay in Gillingham, one-third in Chatham. The senior officer was a Captain-Superintendent, Chatham Dockyard or the Admiral-superintendent Chatham

In the early 20th century the Rear Admiral Commanding, Chatham Sheerness Reserve Division, was established and became responsible eventually to the Commander-in-Chief, Home Fleet(s). Post holders included Rear Admirals Walter Hodgson Bevan Graham, 3 January 1905 – 3 January 1906; Charles H. Adair 3 January 1906 – 3 January 1907; and Frank Finnis 3 January 1907 – 4 January 1909.

The Royal Naval Barracks, Chatham were purpose-built to provide accommodation and training facilities for the men of the reserve fleet who were waiting to be appointed to ships. Designed by Colonel Henry Pilkington, construction of the barracks began in 1897 and completed in December 1902.

=== Sheerness Dockyard ===
Sheerness Dockyard was a Royal Navy Dockyard located on the Sheerness peninsula, at the mouth of the River Medway in Kent. It was opened in the 1660s and closed in 1960.

It was directed by the Admiral-Superintendent, Sheerness.

== Sub-areas during First and Second World Wars ==
At various times during the First and Second World Wars, up to nine sub-areas were established. These were usually administered by either a retired vice or rear admiral, or an active captain, who were appointed as Senior Naval Officers or Flag Officers.

Sub-area	Flag ship or ships borne in	Flag officers/officers commanding	Dates	Ref
Brightlingsea	HMS Wallaroo; HMS City of Perth then HMS Nemo	Senior Naval officer, Brighlingsea	1914–1945	
Dover	HMS Nemo	Naval Officer-in-Charge, Dover & CO HMS Lynx	1945–1946	
Harwich	HMS Badger	Flag Officer-in-Charge, Harwich	1914–1944	
Humber	HMS Beaver	Flag Officer-in-Charge, Humber	1939–1946	
London	HMS Yeoman	Flag Officer-in-Charge, London	1938–1946	Rear Admiral Edward Courtney Boyle 1939–42; Admiral Martin Dunbar-Nasmith 1942–46
Lowestoft	HMS Minos	Naval Officer-in-Charge, Lowestoft	1914–1918, 1942–1946	
Southend	HMS Leigh	Commander-in-Charge, Southend	1914–1918, 1942–1946	
Yarmouth	HMS Watchful	Flag Officer-in-Charge, Yarmouth	1942–1945	

Other installations:

Facility	Based at	Date	Notes
HM Naval Base, Immingham	Immingham	1914–1918	chain of command was to the SNO/FO, Humber Station
RNTE Shotley	Chatham	1914–1918	Shotley Training Establishment

== Seagoing formations ==
Various units that served in this command included:

Naval units	Based at	Date	Notes
Reserve Fleet	Chatham	1900–1905	4 protected cruisers
Reserve Fleet	Chatham	1906–1914	13 cruisers from the Aeolus, Arrogant, Astraea, Diadem, Eclipse, Edgar classes.
Reserve Fleet	Chatham	1939	inc: 6 cruisers, 15 destroyers, and 5 minesweepers
3rd Battle Squadron	Chatham	May 1916 – April 1918	ex Grand Fleet
2nd Cruiser Squadron	Chatham	1939–1940	
5th Cruiser Squadron	Chatham	1908–1909	
7th Cruiser Squadron	Chatham	1912	
HMS Curacoa (D41)	Chatham	1939	C-class cruiser (light)
HMS London (69)	Chatham	1939	County-class cruiser
1st Destroyer Flotilla	Harwich	December 1939 – June 1940	
4th Destroyer Flotilla	Humber	August – December 1916	
5th Destroyer Flotilla	Chatham	1939–1940	
7th Destroyer Flotilla	Humber/Chatham	August 1914 – November 1918, 1939–1940	WWI part of AOPs
8th Destroyer Flotilla	Chatham	1911–1914	1 cruiser leader, 2 scout cruisers and 24 torpedo boat destroyers
9th Destroyer Flotilla	Nore	1911–1914	1 cruiser leader, 2 scout cruisers and 27 destroyers
16th Destroyer Flotilla	Harwich	June 1940 – May 1945	
18th Destroyer Flotilla	Harwich	June–December, 1940	disbanded
19th Destroyer Flotilla	Chatham	September–October, 1939	transferred to Dover Command
20th Destroyer Flotilla	Immingham	1914–1918, 1941	
21st Destroyer Flotilla	Sheerness	July 1940 – May 1945	formed the southern force for the escort of east coast convoys
22nd Destroyer Flotilla	Harwich	November–December, 1939	inc: renamed 1st Destroyer Flotilla
Nore Flotilla	Harwich	1895–1909	43 torpedo boat destroyers
Nore Local Flotilla	Harwich	1912–1914	was a Destroyer Flotilla
20th Minelaying Destroyer Flotilla	Harwich	1939–1940	
4th Minesweeper Flotilla	Harwich	September 1939 – July 1942	
5th Minesweeper Flotilla	Harwich	September 1939 – April 1941	absorbed into 4MSF
6th Minesweeper Flotilla	Harwich	May–September 1940	
7th Minesweeper Flotilla	Harwich	March 1944 – January 1945	
8th Minesweeper Flotilla	Chatham	1939	
10th Minesweeper Flotilla	Chatham	April 1945	
11th Minesweeper Flotilla	Chatham	April 1945	
15th Minesweeper Flotilla	Chatham	February 1944	
18th Minesweeper Flotilla	Chatham	May 1943	
40th Minesweeper Flotilla	Harwich	1945	
42nd Minesweeper Flotilla	Harwich	August 1944	
117 Minesweeper Flotilla	Sheerness	1944	
133 Minesweeper Flotilla	Sheerness	1944	
140 Minesweeper Flotilla	Sheerness & Harwich	1944	divided between two naval bases
163 Minesweeper Flotilla	Lowestoft	1944	
202 Minesweeper Flotilla	Lowestoft	1944	
203 Minesweeper Flotilla	Harwich	1944	
5th Motor Torpedo Boat Flotilla	Immingham	1939–1941	
11th Motor Torpedo Boat Flotilla	Felixstowe	1944	
21st Motor Torpedo Boat Flotilla	Felixstowe	1944	
22nd Motor Torpedo Boat Flotilla	Felixstowe	1944	
29th Motor Torpedo Boat Flotilla	Felixstowe	1939	
2nd Submarine Flotilla	Immingham	August 1916 – February 1917	coastal defence C Class
3rd Submarine Flotilla	Immingham/Humber/Harwich	September 1916 – 1918, October 1939 – May 1940	
4th Submarine Flotilla	Sherness	August 1916 – September 1917	Disbanded
5th Submarine Flotilla	Sherness	August 1914 – August 1916	renamed 4th Submarine Flotilla
6th Submarine Flotilla	Humber	August 1914 – August 1916	

== Commanders-in-Chief ==
Commanders-in-Chief have included:
No = died in post

=== Commander-in-Chief Thames (1695–1696) ===
- Commodore Stafford Fairborne 1695
- Commodore James Gother 1696 No

=== Commander-in-Chief, Medway (1698–1699) ===
- Captain John Jennings (1698)
- Admiral Sir Cloudesley Shovell (1698–1699)

=== Commander-in-Chief, Thames and Medway (1706–1711) ===
- Captain Robert Fairfax (1706)
- Vice-Admiral Sir John Jennings (1708)

=== Commander-in-Chief, Thames, Medway and Nore (1711–1747) ===
- Rear-Admiral Sir Thomas Hardy (1711–1712)
- Captain George St Lo (1712–1714)
- Captain John Balchen (1716)
- Rear-Admiral William Caldwell (1717) No
- Captain Nicholas Haddock (1732)
- Admiral Sir George Walton (1734–1735)
- Commodore Charles Brown (1741)
- Commodore Christopher O'Brien (1742–1743)
- Commodore Charles Cotterell (1744–1745)
- Commodore Thomas Smith (1745)
- Admiral Sir Chaloner Ogle (1745–1746)
- Commodore Edward Boscawen (1746)
- Vice-Admiral Perry Mayne (1746–1747)

=== Commander-in-Chief, Medway and at the Nore (1747–1797) ===
- Rear-Admiral Henry Osborn (1747–1748)
- Commodore Temple West (1748)
- Commodore George Townshend (1748–1749)
- Admiral Isaac Townsend (1752)
- Commodore Francis Geary (1757–1758)
- Commodore William Boys (1759–1761)
- Commodore William Gordon (1762–1765)
- Commodore William Saltern Willett (1766–1769) No
- Commodore Christopher Hill (1770)
- Rear-Admiral Sir Peter Denis (1771)
- Commodore George Mackenzie (1774–1775)
- Commodore Sir Edward Vernon (1775–1776)
- Rear-Admiral John Campbell (1778)
- Vice-Admiral Robert Roddam (1778–1783)
- Commodore Sir Walter Stirling (1783–1785)
- Commodore Sir Andrew Hamond (1785–1788)
- Vice-Admiral Richard Edwards (1788)
- Commodore Skeffington Lutwidge (1788–1789)
- Commodore Thomas Pasley (1789–1791)
- Commodore William Locker (1792)
- Commodore George Murray (1792–1793)
- Vice-Admiral John Dalrymple (1793–1795)
- Vice-Admiral Sir George Collier (1795)
- Vice-Admiral Charles Buckner (1795–1797)

=== Commander-in-Chief, Nore (1797–1834) ===
Post holders included:

- Vice-Admiral Skeffington Lutwidge (1797–1798)
- Vice-Admiral Sir Thomas Pasley (1798–1799)
- Vice-Admiral Alexander Graeme (1799–1803)
- Vice-Admiral George Elphinstone, 1st Baron Keith (1803–1807) (formed part of North Sea Command)
- Vice-Admiral Thomas Wells (1807–1810)
- Vice-Admiral Sir Henry Stanhope (1810–1811)
- Vice-Admiral Sir Thomas Williams (1811–1814)
- Vice-Admiral Sir Charles Rowley (1815–1818)
- Vice-Admiral Sir John Gore (1818–1821)
- Vice-Admiral Sir Benjamin Hallowell (1821–1824)
- Vice-Admiral Sir Robert Moorsom (1824)
- Vice-Admiral Sir Henry Blackwood (1827–1830)
- Vice-Admiral Sir John Beresford (1830–1833)
- Vice-Admiral Sir Richard King (1833–1834) No

=== Commander-in-Chief, Sheerness (1834–1899) ===
Post holders included:

- Vice-Admiral Charles Elphinstone Fleeming (1834–1837)
- Vice-Admiral Sir Robert Otway (1837–1840)
- Vice-Admiral Sir Henry Digby (1840–1841)
- Vice-Admiral Sir Edward Brace (1841–1843) No
- Vice-Admiral Sir John White (1844–1845) No
- Vice-Admiral Sir Edward Durnford King (1845–1848)
- Vice-Admiral Sir George Elliot (1848–1851)
- Vice-Admiral Josceline Percy (1851–1854)
- Vice-Admiral William Gordon (1854–1857)
- Vice-Admiral Sir Edward Harvey (1857–1860)
- Vice-Admiral Sir William Hope-Johnstone (1860–1863)
- Vice-Admiral Sir George Lambert (1863–1864)
- Vice-Admiral Sir Charles Talbot (1864–1866)
- Vice-Admiral Sir Baldwin Walker (1866–1869)
- Vice-Admiral Richard Warren (1869–1870)
- Vice-Admiral Sir Charles Elliot (1870–1873)
- Vice-Admiral George Hastings (1873–1876)
- Vice-Admiral Sir Henry Chads (1876–1877)
- Vice-Admiral Sir William King-Hall (1877–1879)
- Vice-Admiral Sir Reginald Macdonald (1879–1882)
- Vice-Admiral Sir Edward Rice (1882–1884)
- Vice-Admiral Sir John Corbett (1884–1885)
- Vice-Admiral Ernst Leopold, 4th Prince of Leiningen (1885–1887)
- Vice-Admiral Charles Waddilove (1887–1888)
- Vice-Admiral Thomas Lethbridge (1888–1890)
- Vice-Admiral Charles Curme (1890–1892) No
- Vice-Admiral Sir Algernon Heneage (1892–1894)
- Vice-Admiral Sir Richard Wells (1894–1896)
- Vice-Admiral Sir Henry Nicholson (1896–1897)
- Vice-Admiral Sir Charles Hotham (1897–1899)

=== Commander-in-Chief, Nore (1899–1961) ===
Post holders included:

- Vice-Admiral Sir Nathaniel Bowden-Smith (1899–1900)
- Vice-Admiral Sir William Kennedy (1900–1901)
- Vice-Admiral Sir Albert Markham (1901–1903)
- Admiral Sir Hugo Pearson (1903–1907)
- Admiral Sir Gerard Noel (1907–1908)
- Admiral Sir Charles Drury (1908–1911)
- Admiral Sir Richard Poore (1911–1915)
- Admiral Sir George Callaghan (1915–1918)
- Admiral Sir Doveton Sturdee (1918–1921)
- Admiral Sir Hugh Evan-Thomas (1921–1924)
- Vice Admiral Sir William Goodenough (1924–1927)
- Admiral Sir Edwyn Alexander-Sinclair (1927–1930)
- Admiral Sir Reginald Tyrwhitt (1930–1933)
- Vice Admiral Sir Hugh Tweedie (1933–1935)
- Vice Admiral Sir Edward Evans (1935–1939)
- Admiral Sir Studholme Brownrigg (January 1939 – December 1939)
- Admiral Sir Reginald Plunkett (1939–1941)
- Admiral Sir George Lyon (1941–1943)
- Admiral Sir John Tovey (1943–1946)
- Admiral Sir Harold Burrough (1946–1948)
- Admiral Sir Henry Moore (1948–1950)
- Admiral Sir Cecil Harcourt (1950–1952)
- Admiral Sir Cyril Douglas-Pennant (1952–1953)
- Admiral Sir Geoffrey Oliver (1953–1955)
- Admiral Sir Frederick Parham (1955–1958)
- Admiral Sir Robin Durnford-Slater (1958–1961)

== Senior staff officers ==
=== Flag Captain, the Nore ===
Post holders supporting the senior naval officer at the Nore included:

- Captain William G. Luard: July 1860 – July 1863
- Captain John Fulford: July 1863 – April 1866
- Captain Donald McL. Mackenzie: April 1866 – June 1869
- Captain Thomas Miller: June 1869 – June 1870
- Captain John C. Wilson: June 1870 – January 1872
- Captain George W. Watson: January 1872 – January 1875
- Captain Charles T. Curme: January 1875 – February 1876
- Captain St. George C. D'Arcy-Irvine: February 1876 – September 1877
- Captain Thomas B. Lethbridge: September 1877 – January 1879
- Captain Thomas B. M. Sulivan: January 1879 – July 1881
- Captain John D'Arcy: July 1881 – September 1883
- Captain James A. Poland: September 1883 – September 1886
- Captain Frederick C. B. Robinson: September 1886 – July 1887
- Captain Arthur C. Curtis: July 1887 – July 1890
- Captain Leicester C. Keppel: July 1890 – August 1892
- Captain Henry H. Boys: August 1892 – October 1894
- Captain William H. C. St.Clair: October 1894 – February 1896
- Captain James L. Hammet: February 1896 – January 1898
- Captain William F. S. Mann: January 1898 – July 1899
- Captain Charles Campbell: July–October 1899
- Captain Henry C. Bigge: October 1899 – February 1901
- Captain Archibald Y. Pocklington: February 1901 – December 1902
- Captain Arthur Y. Moggridge: January 1907 – April 1908
- Captain Clement Greatorex: April–December 1908
- Captain Henry J. L. Clarke: December 1908 – August 1911
- Captain Philip H. Colomb: August 1911 – January 1915
- Captain Ernest A. Taylor: January 1915 – May 1916
- Captain William Bowden-Smith: May–July 1916
- Captain Alexander V. Campbell: July 1916 – April 1918
- Captain Cecil M. Staveley: April–October 1918

=== Chief of Staff, the Nore ===
Post holders supporting the CINC, Nore included:

- Captain Theobald W. B. Kennedy: October 1918 – May 1921
- Captain Wilfred Tomkinson: May 1921 – June 1923
- Captain Herbert W.W. Hope: June 1923 – December 1924
- Captain the Hon. William S. Leveson-Gower: December 1924 – May 1927
- Captain the Hon. E. Barry S. Bingham: May 1927 – May 1929
- Captain Douglas B. Le Mottee: May 1929 – May 1931
- Captain Reginald V. Holt: May 1931 – August 1933
- Captain Hector Boyes: August 1933 – November 1934
- Captain Robert B. Ramsay: November 1934 – December 1935
- Captain Reginald B. Darke: December 1935 – August 1937
- Captain Philip Esmonde Phillips: August 1937 – July 1938
- Captain the Hon. George Fraser: July 1938 – May 1940
- Rear-Admiral Alfred H. Taylor: May 1940 – March 1943
- Commodore George H. Creswell: March–October 1943
- Commodore Robert G. H. Linzee: October 1943 – April 1946
- Captain Albert L. Poland: April 1946 – July 1948
- Captain Lennox A. K. Boswell: July 1948 – May 1949
- Captain Arthur M. Knapp: May 1949 – June 1951
- Captain Herbert F. H. Layman: June 1951 – January 1953
- Captain Ronald E. Portlock: January 1953 – December 1954
- Captain John A. W. Tothill: December 1954 – July 1956
- Captain William A. F. Hawkins: July 1956 – December 1957
- Captain Roger B. N. Hicks: December 1957 – April 1960
- Captain Barry J. Anderson: April 1960 – March 1961

==== Offices under the Chief of Staff ====
Included:

- Deputy Chief of Staff
- Assistant Secretary
- Duty Staff Officer
- Flag Lieutenant-Commander
- Secretary to Chief of Staff
- Staff Officer (Minesweeping)
- Staff Officer A/P & Deputy Staff Officer (Minesweeping)
- Staff Officer (Convoys)
- Staff Officer (Intelligence)
- Staff Officer (LD)
- Staff Officer (Operations)
- Staff Officer (Plans)
- Staff Signal Officer
- Staff Torpedo Officer
- Maintenance Captain
