= William Gore Jones =

Royal Navy Admiral (1826–1888)

Admiral William Gore Jones CB
- Born: 12 March 1826
- Died: 28 May 1888 (aged 62)
- Military career
- Allegiance: United Kingdom
- Branch: Royal Navy
- Rank: Admiral
- Commands: East Indies Station
- Conflicts: Crimean War
- Awards: Companion of the Order of the Bath

Admiral William Gore Jones CB (12 March 1826 – 28 May 1888) was a Royal Navy officer who served as Commander-in-Chief, East Indies Station.

== Naval career ==
Jones became a lieutenant in 1848. For his service in the Black Sea during the Crimean War, he given the Légion d'honneur, 5th class and the Order of the Medjidie, 5th class. Promoted to captain in 1861, he took command of HMS Princess Royal, Flagship of Sir George King, in 1864. He was appointed Commander-in-Chief, East Indies Station in 1879 and retired in 1887.

Military offices
Preceded by John Corbett	Commander-in-Chief, East Indies Station; 1879–1882	Succeeded by Sir William Hewett
