= Henry Hickley =

Royal Navy Admiral (1826–1903)

Admiral Henry Hickley
- Born: 11 December 1826
- Died: 22 December 1903 (aged 77)
- Military career
- Allegiance: United Kingdom
- Branch: Royal Navy
- Rank: Admiral
- Commands: HMS Hotspur; HMS Audacious; HMS Iron Duke; HMS Impregnable; Coast of Ireland Station

Admiral Henry Dennis Hickley (11 December 1826 – 22 December 1903) was a Royal Navy officer who became Senior Officer, Coast of Ireland Station.

== Naval career ==
Hickley became commanding officer of the armoured ram HMS Hotspur in May 1872, commanding officer of the battleship HMS Audacious in September 1873 and commanding officer of the Central battery ship HMS Iron Duke in August 1875. He went on to be Captain of the training ship HMS Impregnable in January 1878 and Senior Officer, Coast of Ireland Station in March 1885 before he retired in December 1886.

Military offices
Preceded by Thomas Lethbridge	Senior Officer, Coast of Ireland Station; 1885–1886	Succeeded by Walter Carpenter
