= HMS Undaunted (1861) =

Frigate of the Royal Navy

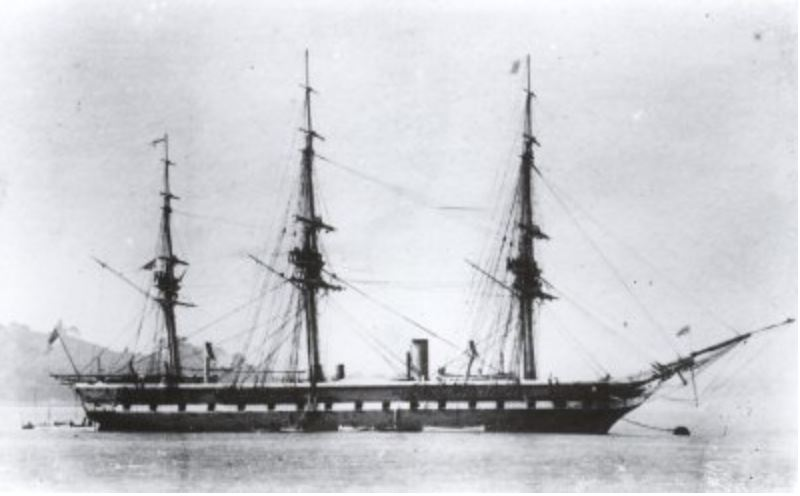
- HMS Undaunted

History

United Kingdom
- Name: Undaunted
- Builder: Chatham Dockyard
- Laid down: 28 May 1859
- Launched: 1 January 1861
- Completed: 16 July 1861 (for Reserve)
- Commissioned: 2 March 1875
- Fate: Sold for breaking up in November 1882

General characteristics
- Class & type: Bristol-class frigate
- Displacement: 4,094 long tons (4,160 t)
- Length: 250 ft (76.2 m) (gundeck); 214 ft 9.75 in (65.5 m) (keel)
- Beam: 52 ft 1 in (15.9 m)
- Draught: 22 ft 9 in (6.9 m) (loaded)
- Installed power: 2,503 ihp (1,866 kW)
- Propulsion: 1 shaft, 1 Steam engine
- Speed: 12 knots (22 km/h; 14 mph)
- Complement: 550-600
- Armament: Thirty 8-inch (203 mm) muzzle-loading smoothbore guns; Twenty 32-pounder muzzle-loading smoothbore guns; One 68-pounder muzzle-loading smoothbore gun

HMS Undaunted was a wooden screw frigate, the fifth ship of the name to serve in the Royal Navy.

She was the last of the Bristol-class, (which included Bristol, Glasgow' and Newcastle, as well as Undaunted; other ships ordered to the same design were cancelled). She was built as a composite wooden-hulled vessel, built with a telescopic funnel and hoisting screws. She was ship rigged throughout, It is thought that the installation of a wrought iron mast in HMS Undaunted may have been experimental.

After launching, she went to Sheerness Dockyards for completion, and was then put straight into Reserve She was commissioned under Captain Hugh Campbell, sailing for the East Indies as the Flagship of Rear Admiral Reginald Macdonald.

Undaunted had some distinguished Captains, including Captain Harry Woodfall Brent, (1834–1911), who commanded Undaunted later in 1875.

She was then commanded by Captain Nathaniel Bowden-Smith, East Indies, again as the flagship of Rear-Admiral Macdonald, then of Rear-Admiral John Corbett (until he transferred his flag to HMS Euryalus). In 1879, Undaunted, under Captain John D'Arcy, returned to Chatham, where she was decommissioned and then scrapped in 1880. She was finally sold in 1882.

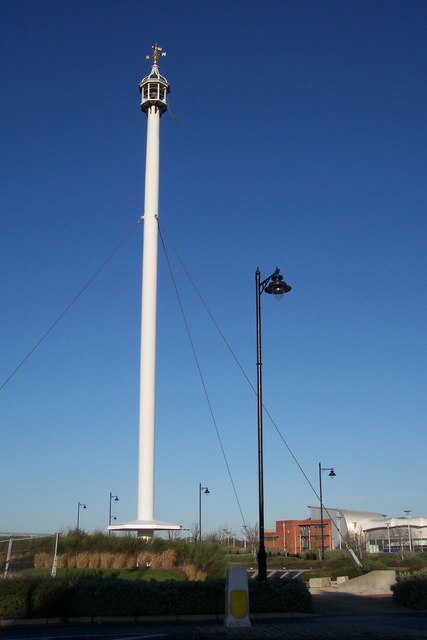
The bell mast, Chatham Dockyard. Formerly the foremast of HMS Undaunted

== Bell mast ==
The iron bell mast from this vessel still survives at the Chatham Royal Dockyard site. It is 100 ft tall and weighs 20 tonnes, it was then refurbished and erected in 1903, and the bell was rung to signal each change of shift for the dockyard employees until its closure in 1984. In 1992, the mast was taken down for repair and storage, due to the construction of the Medway Tunnel.

In April 1999, The bell mast was listed as Scheduled Ancient Monument. It was restored and re-erected in 2001, it now stands at the new entrance to the Historic Dockyard (visitor attraction) off Leviathan Way.
