= Algernon Heneage =

Royal Navy Admiral (1833–1915)

Admiral Sir Algernon Heneage GCB
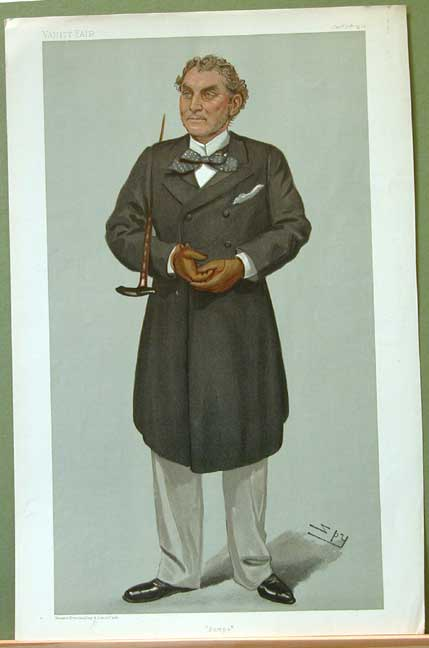
- "Pompo". Caricature by Spy published in Vanity Fair in 1901.
- Born: 19 March 1833
- Died: 10 June 1915 (aged 82)
- Military career
- Allegiance: United Kingdom
- Branch: Royal Navy
- Rank: Admiral
- Commands: HMS Falcon; HMS Rodney; HMS Warrior; Pacific Station; Nore Command
- Awards: Knight Grand Cross of the Order of the Bath

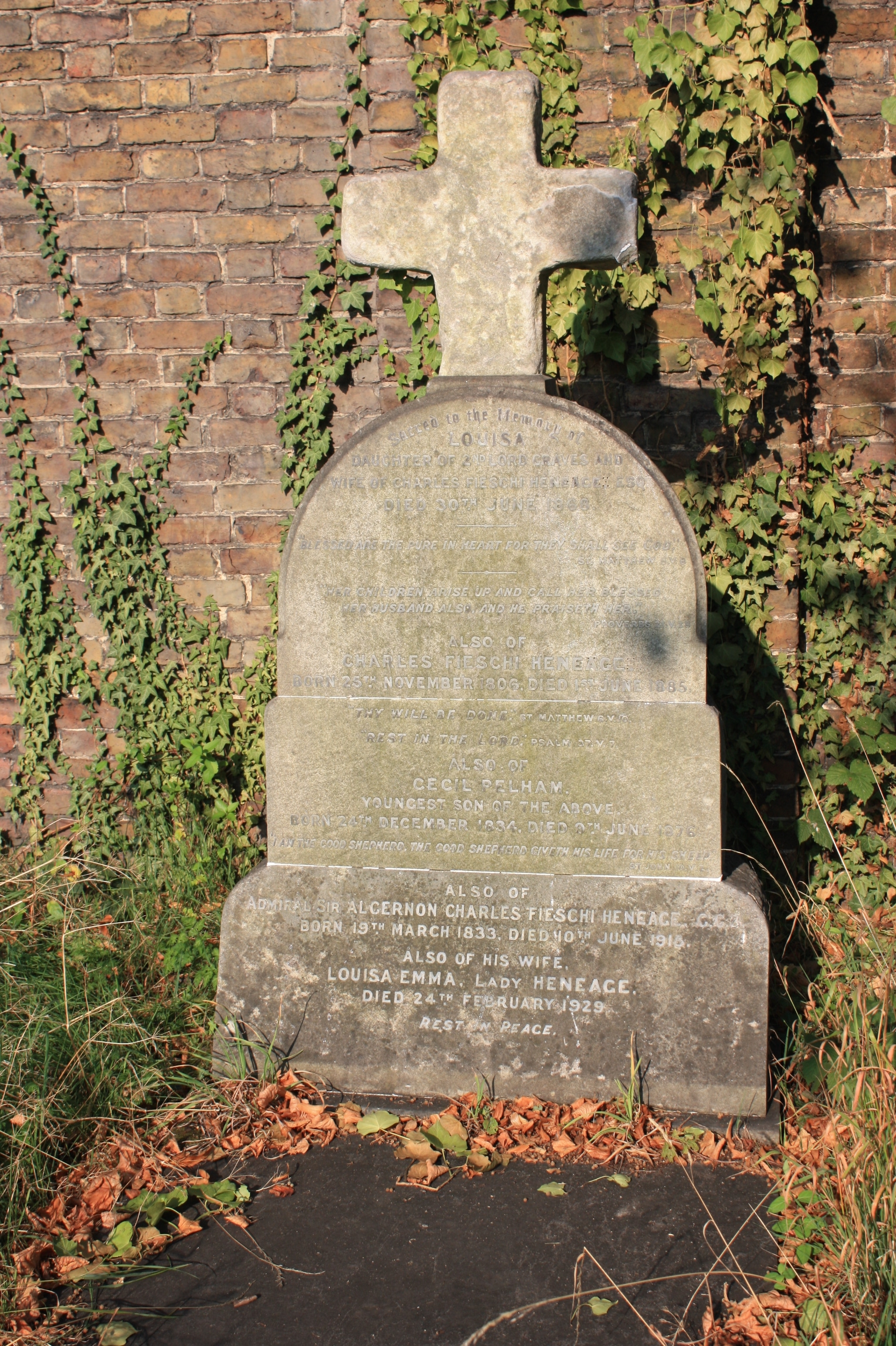
The grave of Admiral Algernon Heneage, Brompton Cemetery

Admiral Sir Algernon Charles Fieschi Heneage GCB (19 March 1833 – 10 June 1915) was a Royal Navy officer who went on to be Commander-in-Chief, The Nore. Dubbed "Pompo", he was known for his immaculate dress and his white-glove inspections of the ships under his command.

== Early life ==
Born at Arthingworth, Northamptonshire, Heneage was the son of Charles Fieschi Heneage, by his marriage to Louisa Elizabeth Graves, a daughter of Thomas Graves, 2nd Baron Graves. His father was then a Captain in the British Army.

== Naval career ==
Heneage was commissioned as a lieutenant into the Royal Navy in 1854. In 1861, he was commanding officer of HMS Falcon, part of the West Africa Squadron. Promoted to captain in 1866, he took command of HMS Rodney in 1867 and then HMS Warrior in 1881. He was promoted to rear-admiral in 1884, and appointed Commander-in-Chief, Pacific Station in 1887. He was promoted vice-admiral in 1889, and appointed Commander-in-Chief, The Nore in 1892. He was appointed a Knight Commander of the Order of the Bath in the 1892 Birthday Honours.

Following the succession of King Edward VII, he was among several retired admirals advanced to Knight Grand Cross of the Order of the Bath (GCB) in the 1902 Coronation Honours list published on 26 June 1902, and received the insignia in an investiture on board the royal yacht Victoria and Albert outside Cowes on 15 August 1902, the day before the fleet review held there to mark the coronation. He was installed as a Knight Grand Cross of the Order of the Bath in 1913.

He died in 1915.

== Family ==
In 1874 he married Louisa Emma Antrobus, a daughter of Sir Edmund Antrobus, 3rd Baronet; they had one daughter.

Military offices
Preceded by Sir Michael Culme-Seymour	Commander-in-Chief, Pacific Station; 1887–1890	Succeeded by Sir Charles Hotham
Preceded by Charles Curme	Commander-in-Chief, The Nore; 1892–1894	Succeeded by Sir Richard Wells
