= Charles Waddilove =

Royal Navy Admiral (1828–1896)

Admiral Charles Waddilove
- Born: 13 May 1828
- Died: 17 October 1896 (aged 68)
- Military career
- Allegiance: United Kingdom
- Branch: Royal Navy
- Rank: Admiral
- Commands: HMS Adventure; HMS Pallas; HMS Inconstant; HMS Asia; Nore Command

Admiral Charles Lodowick Darley Waddilove (13 May 1828 – 17 October 1896) was a Royal Navy officer who went on to be Commander-in-Chief, The Nore.

== Naval career ==
Born the son of Rev'd. William James Darley Waddilove, Charles Waddilove was appointed a lieutenant in the Royal Navy in 1849. Promoted to captain in 1862, he commanded HMS Adventure, HMS Pallas, HMS Inconstant and then HMS Asia. He was appointed Commander-in-Chief, The Nore in 1887 and retired in 1893.

He lived at Beacon Grange in Hexham.

== Family ==
He married Mary Elizabeth Blackett-Ord; they had five daughters and three sons.

== See also ==
- Darley Waddilove, Charles' grandfather

Military offices
Preceded by The Prince of Leiningen	Commander-in-Chief, The Nore; 1887–1888	Succeeded by Thomas Lethbridge
