= John Corbett (Royal Navy officer) =

Royal Navy Admiral (1822–1893)

Admiral Sir John Corbett KCB
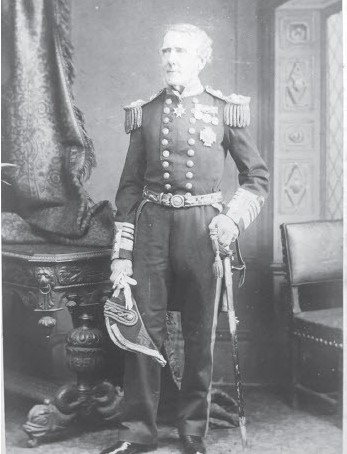
- Born: 15 July 1822
- Died: 10 December 1893 (aged 71); South Kensington, London
- Military career
- Allegiance: United Kingdom
- Branch: Royal Navy
- Rank: Admiral
- Commands: HMS Scout; HMS Hastings; HMS Black Prince; HMS Britannia; HMS Warrior; East Indies Station; Nore Command
- Conflicts: Second Opium War
- Awards: Knight Commander of the Order of the Bath

Admiral Sir John Corbett, KCB (15 July 1822 – 10 December 1893) was a Royal Navy officer who served as Commander-in-Chief, East Indies Station.

== Naval career ==
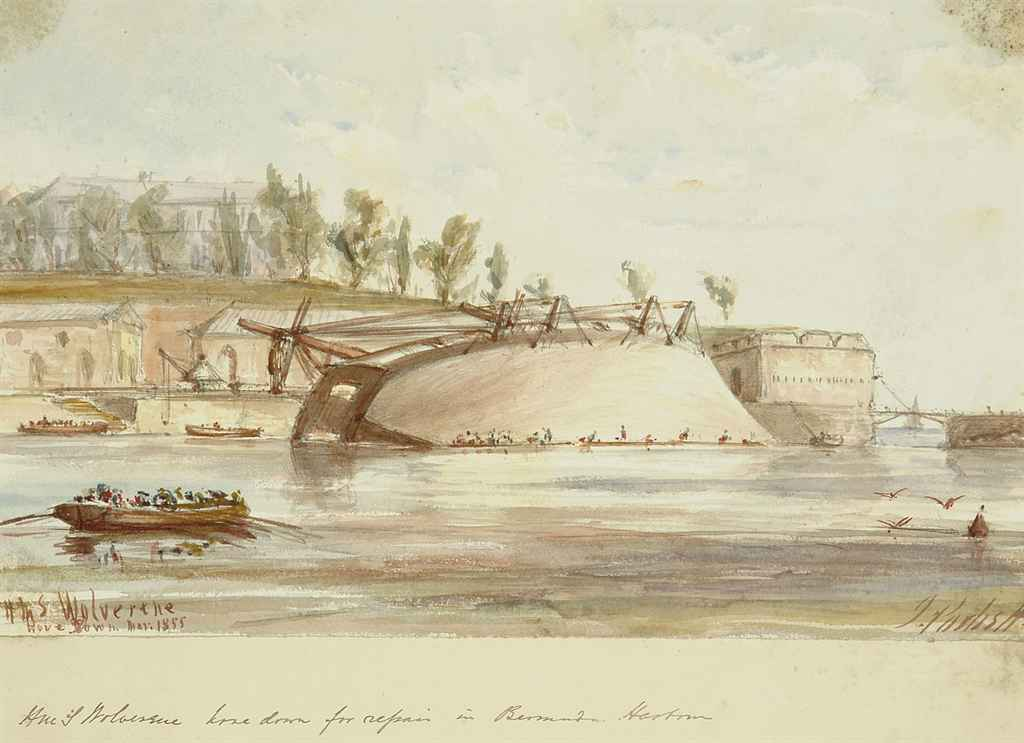
HMS Wolverene hove down for repairs in Bermuda Harbour, 1855, by Corbett

Corbett joined the Royal Navy in 1835. Promoted to commander in 1852, he served in the Second Opium War. Following his promotion to captain in 1857, he commanded HMS Scout, HMS Hastings, HMS Black Prince and then the training ship HMS Britannia. In 1867 he commanded HMS Warrior. He was made Commander-in-Chief, East Indies Station in 1877 and Commander-in-Chief, The Nore in 1884. He retired in 1887.

In his spare time Corbett was an amateur artist who painted watercolours during his travels in the 1850s and 1860s.

== Family ==
In 1864, he married Georgina Grace Holmes. Their son Admiral Charles Frederick Corbett also reached flag rank in the Royal Navy.

Military offices
| Preceded by Sir Reginald Macdonald | Commander-in-Chief, East Indies Station; 1877–1879 | Succeeded by William Jones |
| Preceded by Sir Edward Rice | Commander-in-Chief, The Nore; 1884–1885 | Succeeded by The Prince of Leiningen |
