= Charles Frederick Hotham =

Royal Navy Admiral of the Fleet (1843–1925)

Admiral of the Fleet Sir Charles Hotham GCB GCVO
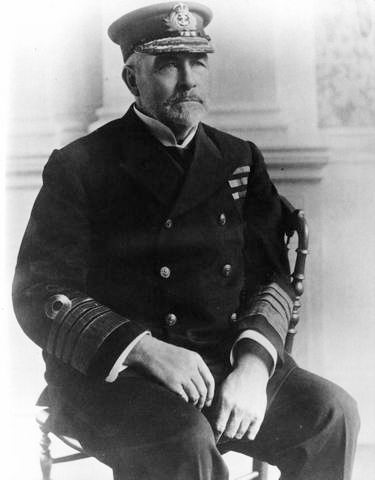
- Sir Charles Hotham c.1890
- Born: 20 March 1843; York, Yorkshire
- Died: 22 March 1925 (aged 82); London
- Military career
- Allegiance: United Kingdom
- Branch: Royal Navy
- Service years: 1863–1913
- Rank: Admiral of the Fleet
- Commands: Portsmouth Command; Nore Command; Pacific Station; HMS Alexandra; HMS Thunderer; HMS Charybdis; HMS Jaseur
- Conflicts: New Zealand Wars; Anglo-Egyptian War ‘Urabi Revolt
- Awards: Knight Grand Cross of the Order of the Bath; Knight Grand Cross of the Royal Victorian Order; Order of Osmanieh (Ottoman Empire)

Admiral of the Fleet Sir Charles Frederick Hotham GCB, GCVO (20 March 1843 – 22 March 1925) was a Royal Navy officer. As a junior officer, he was a member of the naval brigade that fought the Māori people at the Battle of Rangiriri during the invasion of the Waikato and was also present at the Battle of Gate Pā during the Tauranga Campaign. He later took part in the bombardment of Alexandria during the Anglo-Egyptian War and then went ashore as Chief of Staff of the naval brigade, formed under Admiral Sir Beauchamp Seymour, which was dispatched to restore the authority of Khedive Tewfik Pasha in the face of Ahmed ‘Urabi's nationalist uprising against the administration.

Hotham went on to be Commander-in-Chief, Pacific Station. He sought to intervene in the Chilean Civil War by arranging a peace agreement between the forces of President José Manuel Balmaceda and those of the National Congress of Chile who opposed the President. Unfortunately Hotham was shot at while going ashore, no agreement was signed and the Civil War rumbled on until a much larger international peace-keeping force arrived to restore order. Hotham later became Commander-in-Chief, The Nore and then Commander-in-Chief, Portsmouth.

== Early career ==
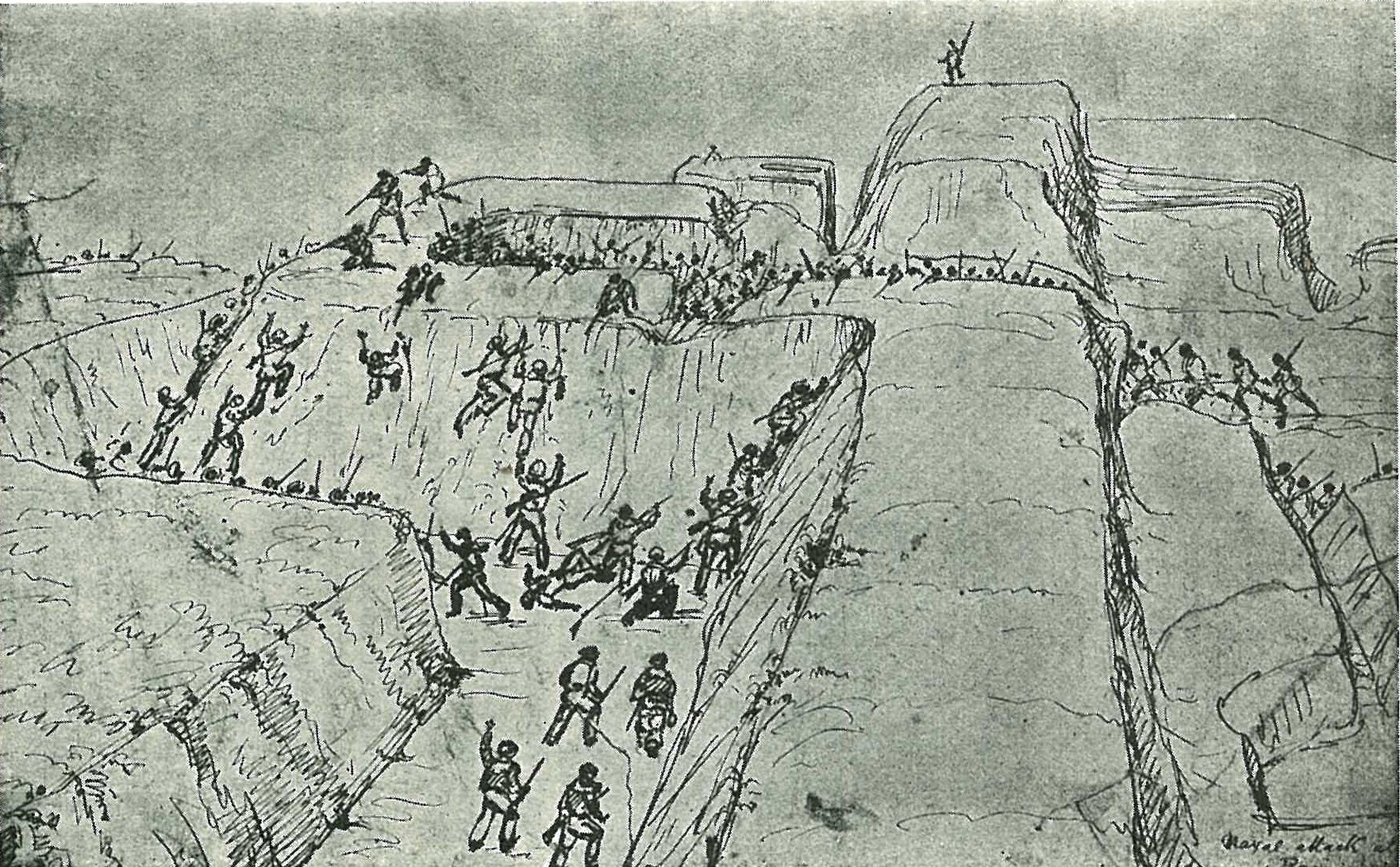
The repulse of the Royal Navy storming party at Rangiriri

Born in York the son of Captain John Hotham and Maria Elizabeth Hotham (née Thompson), Hotham joined the Royal Navy in 1856. Promoted to lieutenant on 17 February 1863, he was appointed to the frigate HMS Curacoa, flagship of the Commodore commanding the Australia Station. He was a member of the naval brigade that fought the Māori people at the Battle of Rangiriri in November 1863 during the invasion of the Waikato. The invasion was aimed at crushing Kingite power that was seen as a threat to British authority, and also at driving Waikato Māori from their territory in readiness for occupation and settlement by Europeans. His service here was officially "favourably noted". Hotham was also present at the Battle of Gate Pā in April 1864 during the Tauranga Campaign. He was promoted to commander, in recognition of his good service in New Zealand, on 19 April 1865.

After a brief stay in England, Hotham was given command of the gunboat HMS Jaseur on the West Coast of Africa Station in August 1867 and remained with HMS Jaseur when she joined the Mediterranean Fleet in Summer 1869. Promoted to captain on 29 December 1871, he became commanding officer of the corvette HMS Charybdis on the China Station in February 1877 and was briefly commanding officer of the battleship HMS Thunderer before becoming flag captain to the Commander-in-Chief, Mediterranean Fleet in the battleship HMS Alexandra in November 1881. He took part in the bombardment of Alexandria in July 1882 during the Anglo-Egyptian War and then went ashore as Chief of Staff of the naval brigade, formed under Admiral Sir Beauchamp Seymour, which was dispatched to restore the authority of Khedive Tewfik Pasha in the face of Ahmed ‘Urabi's nationalist uprising against the administration. Hotham was appointed a Companion of the Order of the Bath (CB) on 14 August 1882.

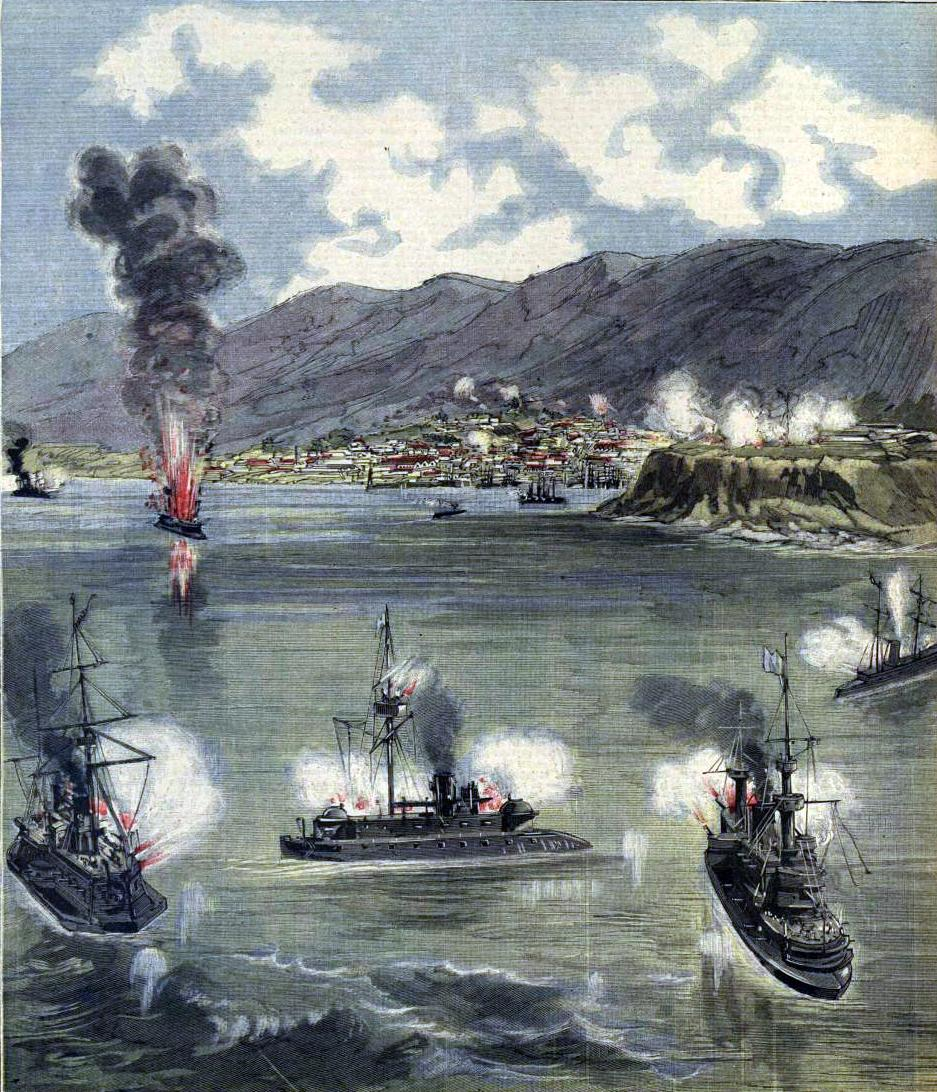
The rebel fleet in action during the Chilean Civil War

Hotham became senior officer on the South East Coast of America Station in April 1885: his fleet consisted of the corvette HMS Ruby and three gunboats. He went on to be assistant to the Admiral Superintendent of Reserves at the Admiralty in January 1886 and was appointed a naval aide-de-camp to the Queen on 18 January 1886.

== Senior command ==
Promoted to rear admiral on 6 January 1888, Hotham became Junior Naval Lord later that month and then went on to be Commander-in-Chief, Pacific Station, with his flag in the armoured cruiser HMS Warspite, in February 1890. He sought to intervene in the Chilean Civil War in February 1891 by arranging a peace agreement between the forces of President José Manuel Balmaceda and those of the National Congress of Chile who opposed the President. Unfortunately Hotham was shot at while going ashore, no agreement was signed and the Civil War rumbled on until August 1892 when a much larger international peace-keeping force arrived to restore order. Promoted to vice admiral on 1 September 1893, he was advanced to Knight Commander of the Order of the Bath on 25 May 1895.

Hotham became Commander-in-Chief, The Nore in December 1897 and, having been promoted to full admiral on 13 January 1899, he became Commander-in-Chief, Portsmouth in October 1900. He was appointed a Knight Grand Cross of the Royal Victorian Order (GCVO) on 8 March 1901, in recognition of directing the naval ceremonial events at the funeral of Queen Victoria. Following the coronation of King Edward VII the following year, Hotham was in command of the fleet review held at Spithead on 16 August 1902, his flagship HMS Royal Sovereign. For his service he was advanced to Knight Grand Cross of the Order of the Bath (GCB) in the November 1902 Birthday Honours list, and received the award from the king at Buckingham Palace on 18 February 1903. He was promoted to Admiral of the Fleet on 30 August 1903. He retired in March 1913 and died in London on 23 May 1925.

== Family ==
In February 1872 Hotham married Margaret Home; they had a daughter and two sons (the younger of whom was Admiral Sir Alan Hotham).

== Sources ==
- Dalton, B.J. (1967). War and Politics in New Zealand 1855–1870. Sydney: Sydney University Press. ASIN B004SZHU88.
- Heathcote, Tony (2002). The British Admirals of the Fleet 1734 – 1995. Pen & Sword Ltd. ISBN 0-85052-835-6.
- King, Michael (2003). The Penguin History of New Zealand. Penguin Books. ISBN 0-14-301867-1.

Military offices
Preceded by Lord Charles Beresford	Junior Naval Lord; 1888–1889	Succeeded by Sir Frederick Bedford
Preceded by Sir Algernon Heneage	Commander-in-Chief, Pacific Station; 1890–1893	Succeeded by Sir Henry Stephenson
Preceded by Sir Henry Nicholson	Commander-in-Chief, The Nore; 1897–1899	Succeeded by Sir Nathaniel Bowden-Smith
Preceded by Sir Michael Culme-Seymour	Commander-in-Chief, Portsmouth; 1900–1903	Succeeded by Sir John Fisher
