= George Mackenzie (Royal Navy officer) =

Vice-Admiral George Mackenzie
- Died: 1780
- Relatives: Thomas Mackenzie (son)
- Military career
- Allegiance: Great Britain
- Branch: Royal Navy
- Service years: 1740–1780
- Rank: Vice-Admiral
- Commands: HMS Amazon; HMS Tavistock; HMS Inverness; HMS Fowey; HMS Sunderland; HMS Renown; HMS Defiance; HMS Cornwall; HMS Arrogant; Jamaica Station; Nore Command
- Conflicts: War of the Austrian Succession; Raid on Lorient; Seven Years' War; Louisbourg Expedition; Raid on St Malo; Invasion of Martinique; Invasion of Guadeloupe; Anglo-Spanish War; Siege of Havana

Vice-Admiral George Mackenzie (died 1780) was a Royal Navy officer who served as Commander-in-Chief, The Nore from 1774 to 1775.

== Naval career ==
Mackenzie became commanding officer of the frigate HMS Amazon in July 1745 and of the frigate HMS Tavistock in August 1745. Promoted to captain in January 1746, he commanded, successively, the frigate HMS Inverness, the sixth-rate HMS Fowey and the fourth-rate HMS Sunderland and saw action in the Louisbourg Expedition. He went on to command the fifth-rate HMS Renown and saw action in the Raid on St Malo in June 1758, the invasion of Martinique in January 1759 and the invasion of Guadeloupe in spring 1759. After that he was given command of the fourth-rate HMS Defiance and took part in the siege of Havana in spring 1762. We went on to command the third-rate HMS Cornwall and then the third rate HMS Arrogant. He became Commander-in-Chief Jamaica Station in August 1770 and served as Commander-in-Chief, The Nore from January 1774 to 1775.

He was appointed Rear-Admiral of the Red in January 1778 and Vice-Admiral of the Blue in March 1779. His son, Thomas, also served as an admiral.
