= Charles Curme =

British Royal Navy officer

Vice-Admiral Charles Curme
- Born: 2 August 1827
- Died: 19 February 1892 (aged 64)
- Military career
- Allegiance: United Kingdom
- Branch: Royal Navy
- Service years: 1841–1892
- Rank: Vice-Admiral
- Commands: HMS Repulse; HMS Duncan; HMS Indus; Nore Command

Vice-Admiral Charles Thomas Curme (2 August 1827 – 19 February 1892) was a Royal Navy officer who served as Commander-in-Chief, The Nore.

== Naval career ==
Curme joined the Royal Navy in 1841. Promoted to captain in 1864, he commanded HMS Repulse, HMS Duncan and then HMS Indus. He was made Admiral Superintendent of Devonport dockyard in 1880 and in that role opposed the appointment of civil assistants in dockyards believing dockyards should be run by naval officers. He became Commander-in-Chief, The Nore in 1890 and died in office two years later.

Military offices
Preceded by Thomas Lethbridge	Commander-in-Chief, The Nore; 1890–1892	Succeeded by Sir Algernon Heneage
