= HMS Gaiete =

Sloop of the Royal Navy

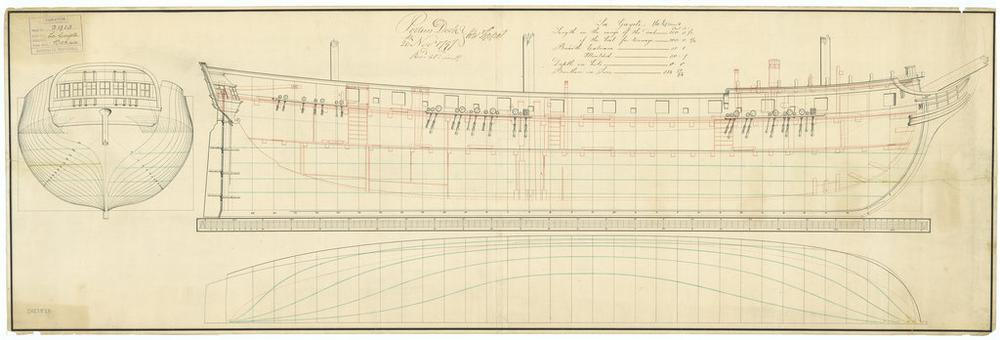
- Gaiete (La Gayete), plan drawn in 1797

History

France
- Name: Gaieté or Gayette
- Builder: Bayonne
- Laid down: October 1793
- Launched: 1796
- Fate: Captured by Arethusa, 10 August 1797

Great Britain
- Name: HMS Gaiete
- Acquired: By capture, 10 August 1797
- Commissioned: June 1798
- Fate: Sold, 1808

General characteristics
- Type: Corvette
- Tons burthen: 51420/94 (bm)
- Length: 120 ft 3 1/2 in (36.7 m) (overall); 100 ft 0 3/4 in (30.5 m) (keel)
- Beam: 30 ft 1 in (9.2 m)
- Depth of hold: 8 ft 8 in (2.6 m)
- Complement: French service: 186; British service:125
- Armament: French service: 20 × 8-pounder guns; British service: 18 × 32-pounder carronades; 2 × 9-pounder chase guns

HMS Gaiete (also Gayette) was a French Bonne Citoyenne-class corvette that the British frigate HMS Arethusa captured off Bermuda in 1797. She then served in the Royal Navy until she was sold in 1808.

== Capture ==
Gaité initially sailed from Bayonne to Rochefort. She then received the mission to carry passengers and supplies to Cayenne. Her mission was completed, and she proceeded to patrol the Antilles.

At daybreak on 10 August 1797 44-gun Arethusa, commanded by Captain Thomas Wolley, was in the Atlantic Ocean at 30°49′N 55°50′W when she sighted three ships to windward. At 7:30 a.m. one of the ships bore down to within half-gunshot, and opened fire. She proved to be the 20-gun Gaieté, under the command of Enseigne de vaisseau Jean-François Guignier. She had been out of Cayenne about four weeks when she encountered Arethusa.

With Gaieté having taken on a ship twice her size, there could only be one outcome. The British captured Gaieté within half an hour. She had sustained considerable damage to her sails and rigging, and lost two seamen killed and eight wounded, including Ensign Dubourdieu. Arethusa lost one seaman killed the captain's clerk and two seamen wounded.

The French brig Espoir observed the engagement and then sailed away. The Royal Navy captured Espoir in September, in the Mediterranean.

== Royal Navy service ==
Gaiete was commissioned into the Royal Navy in June 1798 under Commander Edward Durnford King for service in the North Sea. In 1799 she was serving in the Channel.

On 4 March 1799 she sailed for Jamaica. She and the frigate Unite left Portsmouth as escorts to a convoy for the West Indies. Next, Gaiete captured the brig Rose on 7 April.

Then on 11 January 1800 Gaiete captured the sloop Santa Christa.

Between February and May 1800, Gaiete captured or detained several vessels:

- schooner Speculator, 60 tons (bm), sailing from Guadeloupe to Copenhagen with a cargo of sugar and coffee (10 February);
- ship Albion, of six guns and 500 tons (bm), sailing from Sunderland to Jamaica with a cargo of coals (retaken 16 February);
- schooner Seaflower, of five men, sailing from Guadaloupe to Saint Thomas in ballast (18 February);
- ship Daedalus, of six guns, 17 men, and 300 tons (bm), sailing from Deptford to Martinique with provisions for the government (retaken 28 February);
- brig Good Fortune, of six men and 70 tons (bm), sailing from Liverpool, North America, to Antigua with a cargo of fish (retaken 5 March);
- French schooner Success, of two guns, 60 men, and 60 tons (bm), sailing from Saint Bartholomew to Guadeloupe (6 March);
- brig Renwick, 150 tons (bm), sailing from Norfolk, North America, to Antigua with a cargo of wheat and flour (captured 4 March and retaken 16 March);
- schooner Betsey, of nine men and 69 tons (bm), sailing from Leghorn to Charlestown with a cargo of wine, oil, etc., (retaken 2 May);
- schooner Elianne and Delphine (French tender), of ten men, sailing from Guadeloupe to Saint Bartholomew with a cargo of wine and sugar (6 May).

On 22 August, Gaiete captured the Petite Fortuné (alias Fortuna).

In late 1800, after Durnford King was promoted to Acting-Captain of Leviathan Commander Richard Peacocke became captain. Peacocke received a promotion to post captain on 4 June 1801.

In April 1802, Gaite was at Dominica with the 74-gun ships Magnificent and Excellent, and the frigate Severn to assist in suppressing a mutiny that had broken out on 9 April in the 8th West India Regiment. The soldiers had killed three officers, imprisoned the others, and taken over Fort Shirley. On the following day, HMS Magnificent, which was anchored in Prince Rupert's Bay under Captain John Giffard's command, sent a party of marines ashore to restore order. The mutineers fired upon Magnificent with no effect. On 12 April, Governor Cochrane entered Fort Shirley with the Royal Scots Regiment and the 68th Regiment of Foot. The rebels were drawn up on the Upper Battery of Fort Shirley with three of their officers as prisoners and presented arms to the other troops. They obeyed Cochrane's command to ground their arms but refused his order to step forward. The mutineers picked up their arms and fired a volley. Shots were returned, followed by a bayonet charge that broke their ranks and a close-range fire fight ensued. Those mutineers who tried to escape over the precipice to the sea were exposed to grape-shot and canister fire from Magnificent.

== Fate ==
By 1807 Gaiete was in ordinary at Blackwall. The ship was offered for sale at Woolwich Dockyard on 8 July 1808, and sold on 21 July.
