= Thomas Mackenzie (Royal Navy officer) =

Royal Navy Admiral (1753–1813)

Admiral Thomas Mackenzie
- Born: 1753
- Died: 20 September 1813 (aged 59–60)
- Military career
- Allegiance: United Kingdom
- Branch: Royal Navy
- Service years: 1760s to 1813
- Rank: Admiral
- Conflicts: American Revolutionary War; Battle of Quebec; Battle of Porto Praya; French Revolutionary Wars; Glorious First of June; Napoleonic Wars

Admiral Thomas Mackenzie (1753 – 20 September 1813) was a British Royal Navy officer of the late eighteenth century. Mackenzie's career, while successful, was blighted by a series of controversies that limited his opportunities and command, resulting in his placement in reserve for the last 19 years of his career. During his early service, Mackenzie served at a number of engagements in the American Revolutionary War and advanced rapidly, but he was caught during service in the Indian Ocean in the midst of a disagreement between two senior officers and as a result was placed in reserve at the end of the war. At the start of the French Revolutionary Wars ten years later Mackenzie was restored to service, and commanded the ship of the line Gibraltar at the Glorious First of June. Mackenzie was again involved in a major dispute in the aftermath of the battle over credit for the victory, with the result that he never again served at sea.

== Life ==
Thomas Mackenzie was born in 1753, the son of Vice-Admiral George Mackenzie. At a young age, Thomas joined the frigate Montreal and in 1771 passed the lieutenants exam and joined the sloop Trial. He continued to rise in rank, and in 1776 at the start of the American Revolutionary War he was promoted to post captain for his services at the Battle of Quebec, and was assigned command of the 28-gun frigate Lizard. On 4 December he was in command of Lizard when she captured the American privateer Putnam. Mackenzie was later assigned to command the ship Ariel, but was captured with his vessel by the French frigate Amazone on 10 September 1779 near Charleston, South Carolina. Released in Cádiz the following year, Mackenzie returned to Britain, was cleared at a court martial and given command of the frigate Active.

Active was attached to the squadron under Commodore George Johnstone sent to the Cape of Good Hope in 1781, but the force was intercepted at Porto Praya on St Jago by a French squadron. The ensuing Battle of Porto Praya was inconclusive, but the French were able to reinforce the Cape before the British could attack, making an invasion impossible. Continuing westwards, Active joined a squadron under Vice-Admiral Edward Hughes and was engaged in operations on the Malabar coast and against the Dutch city of Negapatam. In 1782 he was ordered by the council at Calcutta to escort a ship pass the Hoogly River which was watched by a French privateer. This diversion caused him to miss the attack on Trincomalee and invoked Hughes' anger, despite Lord Macartney's advocacy of Mackenzie's actions. When peace came the following year, Mackenzie was ordered back to Britain and placed in reserve.

Mackenzie did not serve again until 1793, when the outbreak of the French Revolutionary Wars necessitated the employment of experienced seamen. Taking command of the ship of the line Gibraltar, Mackenzie joined the Channel Fleet under Lord Howe. During the Atlantic campaign of May 1794, Gibraltar was engaged at the actions on 28 and 29 May and again at the Glorious First of June, but failed to distinguish herself at any of the engagements. Mackenzie was consequently left off the list of officer commended for their service and was furious at his omission, as were many of the captains whose names were not included. The resulting furore was highly divisive in the Navy, and Mackenzie was never employed again, despite his promotion to rear-admiral three days later. He remained in reserve, continuing to gain in rank but never participating at sea until his death in 1813, childless at age 60.
