= Reginald Macdonald =

Royal Navy Admiral (1820–1899)

Admiral Sir Reginald Macdonald KCB KCSI
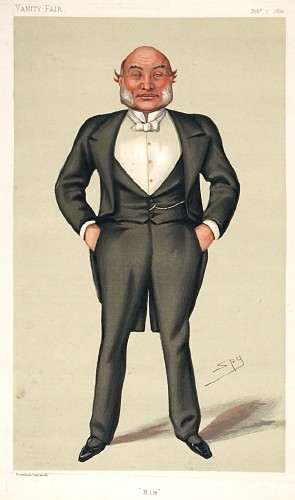
- "Rim". Caricature by Spy published in Vanity Fair in 1880.
- Born: Reginald John James George Macdonald; 19 October 1820; Westminster, Middlesex, England
- Died: 15 December 1899 (aged 79); Kensington, London
- Military career
- Allegiance: United Kingdom
- Branch: Royal Navy
- Rank: Admiral
- Commands: HMS Ferret; HMS Hogue; HMS Arethusa; HMS Bellerophon; East Indies Station; Nore Command
- Conflicts: Eighth Xhosa War
- Awards: Knight Commander of the Order of the Bath; Knight Commander of the Order of the Star of India

Admiral Sir Reginald John James George Macdonald KCB KCSI (19 October 1820 – 15 December 1899) was a Royal Navy officer who served as Commander-in-Chief, East Indies Station.

== Early life ==
Macdonald was born in Westminster, the son of Reginald George MacDonald, chief of Clan Ranald, and Lady Caroline Anne Edgcumbe, daughter of Richard Edgcumbe, 2nd Earl of Mount Edgcumbe.

== Naval career ==
Macdonald joined the Royal Navy in 1833. He served in the Eighth Xhosa War as Commander of HMS Ferret. Promoted to captain in 1854, he commanded HMS Hogue, HMS Arethusa and then HMS Bellerophon. He was appointed Second-in-Command of the Channel Fleet in 1872 and from 1873 he became the 21st chief of the Clan Macdonald of Clanranald.

Promoted to rear-admiral, he was made Commander-in-Chief, East Indies Station with his flag in the armoured cruiser, HMS Undaunted, in 1875 and Commander-in-Chief, The Nore in 1879. He retired in 1884.

== Family ==
In 1855, he married Hon. Adelaide Louisa Warren Venables-Vernon, daughter of 5th Baron Vernon. They had two sons and two daughters:

- Capt. Allan Douglas MacDonald (1856–1908), Chief of Clanranald
- Angus Roderick MacDonald (1858–1944)
- Adelaide Effrida MacDonald
- Maud MacDonald

Military offices
Preceded by Sir Arthur Cumming	Commander-in-Chief, East Indies Station; 1875–1877	Succeeded by Sir John Corbett
Preceded by Sir William King-Hall	Commander-in-Chief, The Nore; 1879–1882	Succeeded by Sir Edward Rice
