= Edward Durnford King =

Royal Navy Admiral (1771–1862)

Admiral Sir Edward Durnford King KCH
- Born: 1771
- Died: 14 January 1862 (aged 90–91)
- Military career
- Allegiance: United Kingdom
- Branch: Royal Navy
- Rank: Admiral
- Commands: HMS Gaiete; HMS Leviathan; HMS Andromeda; HMS Endymion; HMS Monmouth; HMS Rodney; HMS Cornwallis; HMS Windsor Castle; Cape of Good Hope Station; Nore Command
- Conflicts: French Revolutionary Wars; Napoleonic Wars
- Awards: Knight Commander of the Royal Guelphic Order

Admiral Sir Edward Durnford King KCH (1771 – 14 January 1862) was a Royal Navy officer. After taking part in the Glorious First of June he saw action at the blockade of Cádiz before going on to be Commander-in-Chief, Cape of Good Hope and Brazil in 1840 and then Commander-in-Chief, The Nore in 1845.

== Naval career ==
Durnford King joined the Royal Navy in 1786. He took part in the action of the Glorious First of June in 1794 and, having become a lieutenant on HMS Dryad, took part in the capture of the French ship Proserpine in 1796. He was given command of the corvette, HMS Gaiete, in 1798.

Promoted to acting captain in 1800, he was given command of the third-rate, HMS Leviathan and, following his promotion to full captain, he transferred to the fifth-rate, HMS Andromeda. In 1805 he was given command of the fifth-rate, HMS Endymion, and took part in the blockade of Cádiz. He was given command of the third-rate, HMS Monmouth in 1807 and then took part in the capture of Tharangambadi (Tranquebar) in India. He transferred to the third-rate, HMS Rodney, in 1811, the third-rate, HMS Cornwallis, in 1814 and to the second-rate, HMS Windsor Castle in 1825.

Knighted in 1833, he was appointed Commander-in-Chief, Cape of Good Hope Station in 1840 and Commander-in-Chief, The Nore in 1845.

Military offices
Preceded by George Elliot	Commander-in-Chief, Cape of Good Hope Station; 1840–1841	Succeeded by Josceline Percy
Preceded by Sir John White	Commander-in-Chief, The Nore; 1845–1848	Succeeded by Sir George Elliot
