= Thomas Lethbridge (Royal Navy officer) =

Royal Navy Admiral (1829–1892)

Admiral Thomas Lethbridge
- Born: 28 October 1829; Parramatta, Australia
- Died: 30 December 1892 (aged 63)
- Military career
- Allegiance: United Kingdom
- Branch: Royal Navy
- Service years: 1843–1890
- Rank: Admiral
- Commands: HMS Himalaya; HMS Simoom; HMS Trafalgar; HMS Northumberland; HMS Black Prince; HMS Duncan; Coast of Ireland Station; Nore Command

Admiral Thomas Bridgeman Lethbridge (28 October 1829 – 30 December 1892) was a Royal Navy officer who went on to be Commander-in-Chief, The Nore.

== Naval career ==
Born the son of Captain Robert Lethbridge RN, Thomas Lethbridge joined the Royal Navy in 1843. Promoted to captain in 1863, he commanded HMS Himalaya, HMS Simoom, HMS Trafalgar, HMS Northumberland, HMS Black Prince and then HMS Duncan. He was appointed Senior Officer, Coast of Ireland Station in 1883 and Commander-in-Chief, The Nore in 1888. He retired in 1890.

Military offices
Preceded by Richard Hamilton	Senior Officer, Coast of Ireland Station; 1883–1885	Succeeded by Henry Hickley
Preceded by Charles Waddilove	Commander-in-Chief, The Nore; 1888–1890	Succeeded by Charles Curme
