= Marescaux =

Marescaux is a French surname. Notable people with the surname include:

- Gerald Marescaux (1860–1920), British admiral and army officer
- Henri Marescaux (1943–2021), French general and Roman Catholic priest
- Jacques Marescaux (b. 1948), French doctor
- Kathleen Marescaux (1868–1944), Irish painter, wife of Gerald
