= HMS Raleigh (1873) =

Frigate of the Royal Navy

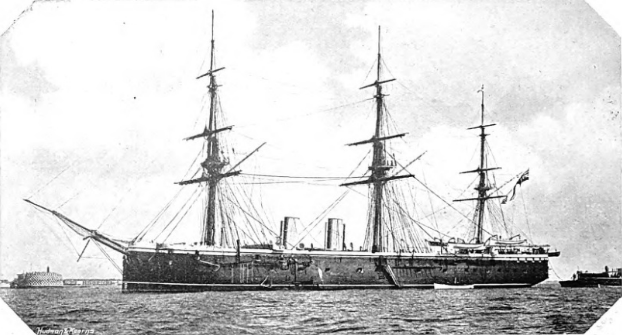
- Raleigh c.1898

History

United Kingdom
- Name: HMS Raleigh
- Builder: Chatham Dockyard, Kent
- Laid down: 8 February 1871
- Launched: 1 March 1873
- Completed: June 1874
- Commissioned: 11 July 1874
- Stricken: 1901
- Fate: Sold for scrap, 11 July 1905

General characteristics
- Type: Unarmored screw frigate
- Displacement: 5,200 long tons (5,283 t)
- Tons burthen: 3,215 bm
- Length: 298 ft (91 m)
- Beam: 49 ft (15 m)
- Draught: 24 ft 10 in (7.57 m)
- Installed power: 5,640 ihp (4,206 kW)
- Propulsion: 1 shaft, 1 Steam engine, 9 boilers
- Sail plan: ship rig
- Speed: 15 knots (28 km/h; 17 mph)
- Range: 2,100 nmi (3,900 km; 2,400 mi) at 10 knots (19 km/h; 12 mph)
- Complement: 530
- Armament: 2 × 9 in (229 mm) muzzle-loading rifles; 14 × 7 in (180 mm) muzzle-loading rifles; 6 × 64-pounder muzzle-loading rifles

HMS Raleigh was an unarmoured iron or "sheathed"-masted frigate completed in 1874. She was one of a series of three designed by Sir Edward Reed. The other two iron-hulled frigates of independent design were HMS Inconstant and HMS Shah. The Controller originally intended to build six of these big frigates, but only three were ordered in view of their high cost. They retained the traditional broadside layout of armament, with a full rig of masts and sails. Although widely believed to be named after Sir Walter Raleigh, the ship was in fact named for George of Raleigh.

== Building programme ==
The following table gives the build details and purchase cost of Raleigh and the other two iron frigates. Standard British practice at that time was for these costs to exclude armament and stores. (Note that costs quoted by J.W. King were in US dollars.)

Ship	Builder	Maker of engines	Date of			Cost according to			
Ship	Builder	Maker of engines	Laid down	Launch	Completion	BNA 1887			King
Ship	Builder	Maker of engines	Laid down	Launch	Completion	Hull	Machinery	Total excluding armament	King
Inconstant	Pembroke Dockyard	John Penn & Son	27 November 1866	12 November 1868	14 August 1869 *	£138,585	£74,739	£213,324	$1,036,756
Raleigh	Chatham Dockyard	Humphrys, Tennant & Co	8 February 1871	1 March 1873	13 January 1874 *	£147,248	£46,138	£193,386	$939,586
Shah	Portsmouth Dockyard	Ravenhill	7 March 1870	10 September 1873	14 August 1876	£177,912	£57,333	£235,245	$1,119,861

*Date first commissioned.

== Design ==
Raleigh displaced 5,200 tons and was 298 feet (91 m) long between perpendiculars by 49 feet (15 m) wide, and drew 24 feet 7 inches (7.49 m). She was designed as a sailing vessel with an auxiliary steam engine. Under favourable sailing conditions she could make 13 knots (24 km/h; 15 mph). With nine boilers operating at 30 pounds per square inch (210 kPa), her 1-shaft horizontal single expansion engine developed 5,639 horsepower (4,205 kW) and moved her along at 16.2 knots (30.0 km/h; 18.6 mph), an unprecedented speed at the time.

Two 9-inch muzzle-loading rifle (MLR) guns and fourteen 7-inch 90 cwt MLR guns formed the main armament, supplemented by six 64-pounder MLRs. The 9-inch guns were chase weapons, mounted at front and back. The fourteen 7-inch guns were the main deck broadside battery.

These ships were constructed in response to the fast, wooden American Wampanoag-class frigates, and their iron hulls were clad from keel to bulwarks with a double layer of 3-inch timber. Raleigh was copper bottomed. All three had a great range and were designed for use in far seas.

The ship was intended as a successor to the wooden steam-frigates such as Immortalite and Ariadne. Inconstant and Shah had been considered by some too large and too expensive, so Raleigh was designed slightly smaller. The design was a compromise between steam power and a desire to retain good sailing properties. The propeller was damaged during steam trials, breaking one blade and cracking the other, but she proceeded to sailing trials around Ireland before repairs were made. George Tryon, appointed her first captain, made a number of minor alterations to her design details as she was completing building.

Raleigh had a normal crew of 530 men. In 1884, she was partially rearmed, retaining eight 7-inch MLR guns on broadside, but gaining eight more modern 6-inch breech-loading rifled (BLR) guns and eight 5-inch BLR guns. Four modern light guns were added as well as 12 machine guns and two torpedo carriages.

== Service ==
=== First commission ===
On 13 January 1874 Raleigh was commissioned at Chatham by Captain George Tryon, Commander Arthur Knyvet Wilson second in command. Under Tryon, Raleigh served as part of the 1875 Detached Squadron from Autumn 1874 until she left at Bombay in February 1876. The squadron was commanded by Rear Admiral Sir George Granville Randolph until 31 May 1875, and then by Rear Admiral Rowley Lambert. The 1875 Detached Squadron consisted of:

- Narcissus (flag), Nathaniel Bowden-Smith, then (9 June 1875) Lord Charles Montagu Douglas Scott
- Immortalité, Francis Alexander Hume, then Gerard Noel (acting captain)
- Topaze, Arthur Thomas Thrupp
- Newcastle, Robert Gordon Douglas
- Raleigh (left at Bombay), George Tryon
- Doris (joined at Madeira, left at Bombay), Hon Edmund Fremantle

The Detached Squadron travelled to Gibraltar (October 1874) - Madeira (21 October) - Saint Vincent - Montevideo - Falkland Islands (30 January 1875) - Cape of Good Hope (3 April; Raleigh transported Sir Garnet Wolseley and his staff to Natal and then rejoined the others at Saint Helena) - Saint Helena (14 April) - Ascension - Saint Vincent (23 May) - Gibraltar (20 June – 15 July) - Cape of Good Hope - Bombay (22 October; escorting visit to India by the Prince of Wales, the future Edward VII) - Colombo - Trincomalee - Calcutta - Bombay (14 February 1876), where Raleigh left the squadron. The squadron returned to Plymouth on 11 May 1877. Meanwhile Raleigh served in the Mediterranean.

Speed trials between the ships demonstrated that Raleigh was the fastest steaming, but was also the second fastest under sail, after Immortalité. At Montevideo a number of sailors deserted from all the ships of the squadron, but a number were recaptured after searching British merchant ships. Raleigh had already lost 30 men to desertion before leaving England. On the second journey to the Cape of Good Hope a man fell overboard in a high sea. Tryon took the risk of launching a boat to rescue him, which was risky because the high sea might swamp the boat and lose the rescue crew too. However, all went well and Tryon commissioned a painting of the event, with photos of the painting given to every officer.

=== 1877–1879 commission ===
On 11 May 1877 Captain Charles Trelawney Jago took command. Raleigh continued to serve as part of the Mediterranean Fleet, and participated in Hornby's forcing of the Dardanelles to discourage Russian occupation of Constantinople, and the subsequent occupation of Cyprus, acquired from Turkey. On 15 February 1878. Raleigh ran aground at the entrance to the Dardanelles off the Rabbit Islands, Ottoman Empire. She was refloated three or four days later, probably with assistance from HMS Devastation and HMS Hotspur. Raleigh was repaired at Malta and a cost of almost £1,000.

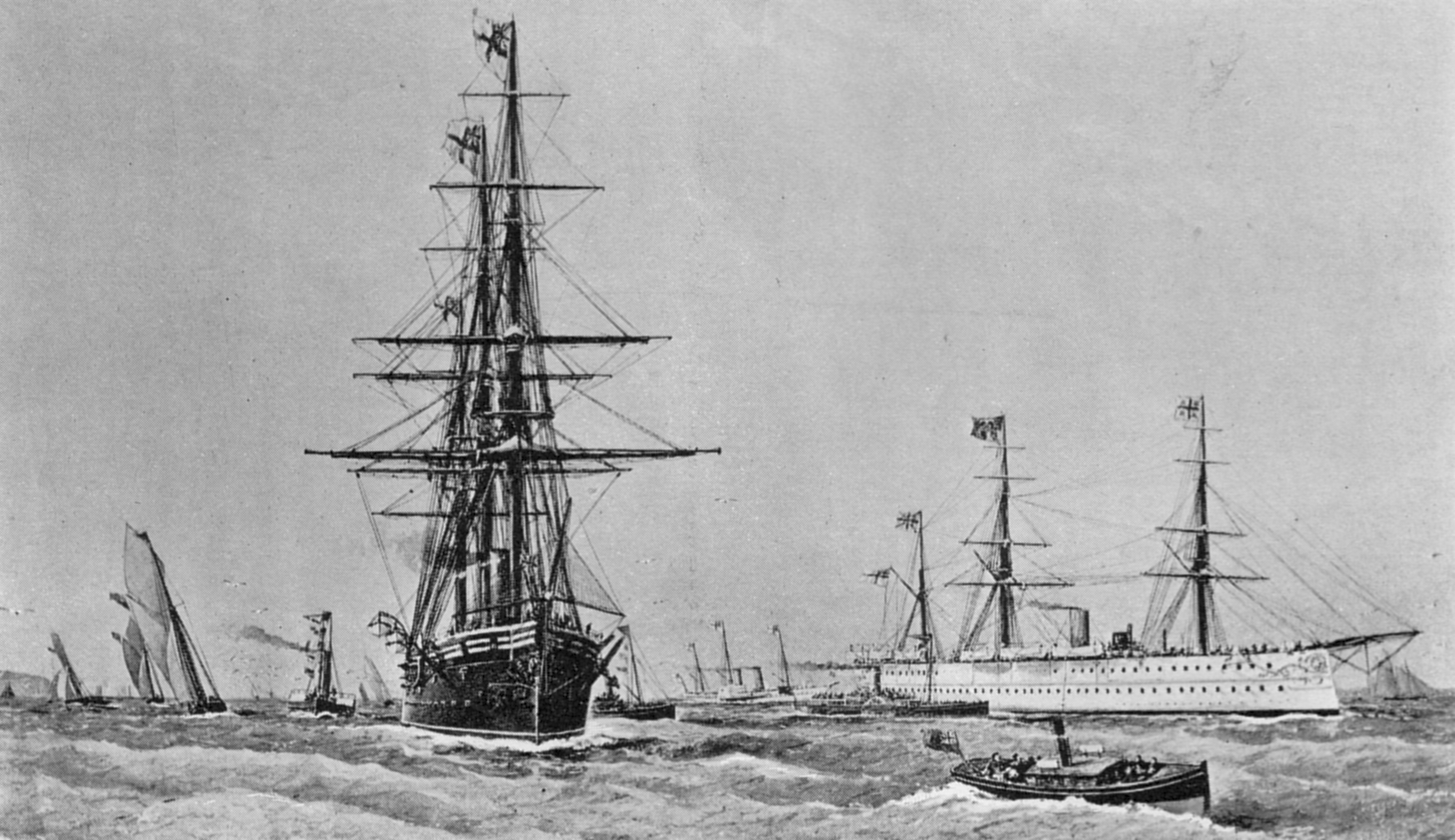
Raleigh with HMS Serapis, during the visit of the Prince of Wales to Bombay in 1875

=== 1885–? commission ===
From 6 March 1885 to 1886 Raleigh was commanded by Captain Arthur Knyvet Wilson, and was flagship of Rear-Admiral Walter James Hunt-Grubbe, on the Cape of Good Hope and West Africa Station. Raleigh continued as flagship of Rear-Admiral Hunt-Grubbe until 29 March 1888. Roger Keyes served aboard her as a young midshipman from 1887 to 1890.

In March 1888 the Raleigh became the flagship of Rear-Admiral Richard Wells, on the same station, and in May 1888 Captain Wilmot Fawkes took command; the ship was recommissioned at Simonstown Dockyard near Cape Town in June 1888.

=== 1890–1893 commission ===
From September 1890 Raleigh was commanded by Captain Arthur Barrow, as flagship of Rear-Admiral Henry Frederick Nicholson, again on the Cape of Good Hope and West Africa station from 1890 to 1893. She was the first posting of midshipman William Fisher. Raleigh is described in his biography as follows:

"The Raleigh was an old ship of 5200 tons displacement, barque-rigged and dependent on sail-power for long passages. She had a curious and mixed armament of muzzle-loading and breech-loading guns and had achieved a speed of 15 knots in her early days. She was typical of the last years of the "Groping Era" and so Fisher's early sea training took place in a ship with main features of two different ages of ship and armament design."

Raleigh was a happy ship; "though hard work was demanded from both officers and men, the leadership was of a high order". In a letter home Midshipman Fisher wrote:

"The lieutenants are nice, in fact nice without exception. Commander O'Callaghan is one of the best Commanders, it is generally acknowledged, in the service. Not for his smartness or ability but by leniency and well placed kindness with the men. He is certainly a most perfect gentleman. Captain Barrow is nice beyond doubt when off duty, when on duty, I think, as his is quite a newly made Captain, he tries to swagger too much and is rather harsh. Perhaps the fact of him being such a dandy sets me against him rather. You should see him go on inspection rounds in the morning with his beautiful white gloves and cane with uniform. David Nevin, our instructor, is a good old boy who has already taught me a considerable amount..."

=== 1894 Madini Creek ambush ===
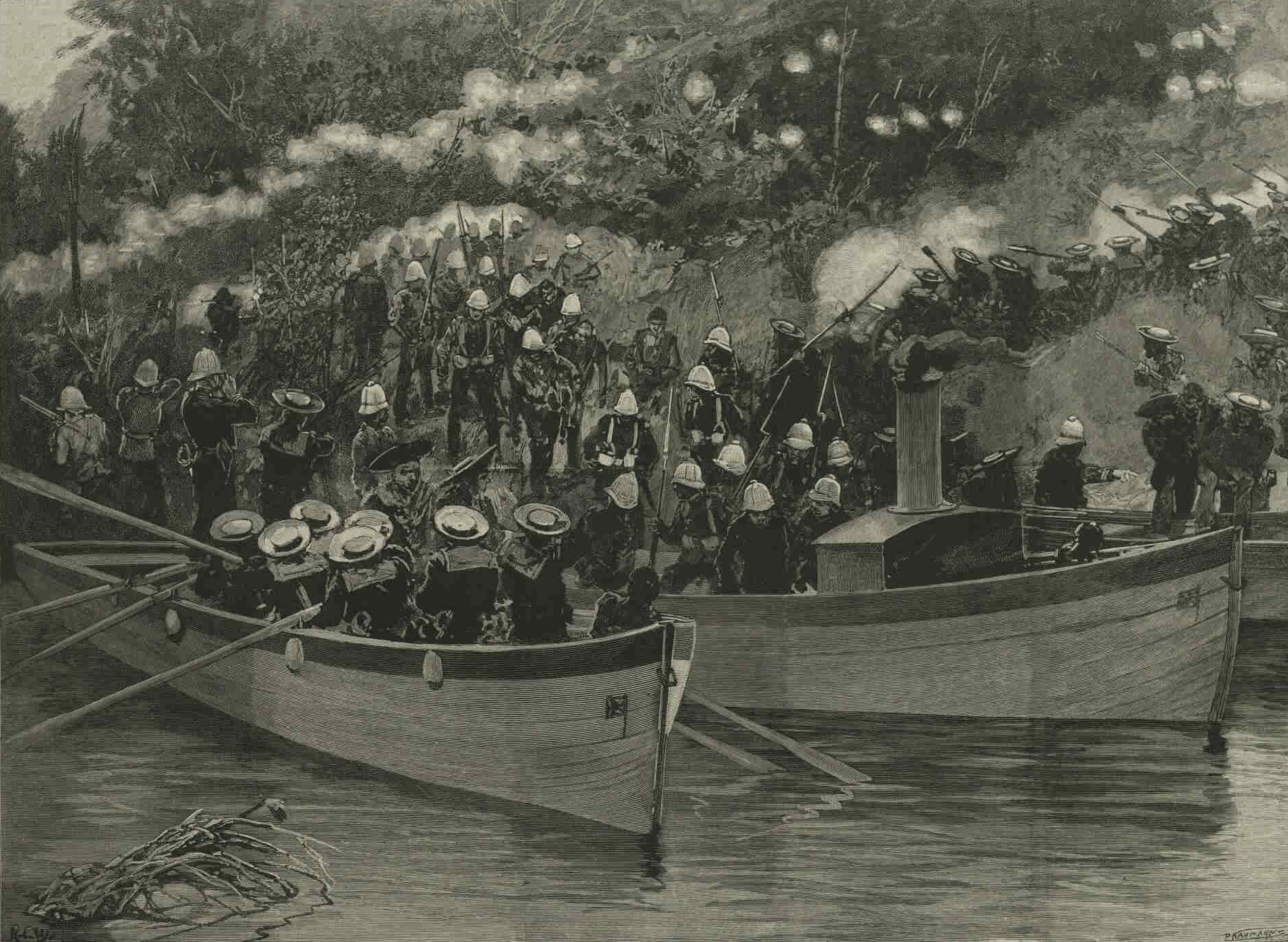
Madini Creek ambush in 1894

HMS Magpie, Raleigh and Widgeon under command of Rear-Admiral Frederick Bedford provided men for an incursion against slavery into the Gambia. The party were split into two columns, one consisting of two hundred and twenty-five bluejackets (naval personnel) from all three ships, was led by Captain Edward Harpur Gamble of the Raleigh. This main column was ambushed at Madini Creek on 23 February 1894. Eighteen men were killed, including two officers from the Raleigh, First Lieutenant William Arnold RN and Lieutenant Francis Hervey of the Marines. Forty-six officers and men were wounded (including Gamble). Shortly afterward British forces succeeded in bringing slavery to an end in the region.

=== Fate ===
When Sir John Fisher was Controller in the late 1890s he appropriated money that was meant for making good defects in Raleigh and used it for "making his own patent improvements in Renown, such as laying a dancing deck."

In September 1902 it was announced she would not yet be sold, but be kept available for the training service.

Raleigh was sold on 11 July 1905 to Messrs Thos. W. Ward of Morecambe to be broken up.
