= Gerald Marescaux =

British military officer (1860–1920)

Vice-Admiral Gerald Marescaux CB CMG
- 1918 portrait
- Born: 10 February 1860; London
- Died: 3 September 1920 (aged 60); Royal Naval Hospital, Chatham
- Burial place: Woodlands Cemetery, Gillingham, Kent
- Spouse: Kathleen Marescaux
- Military career
- Allegiance: United Kingdom
- Branch: Royal Navy (1873–1915); British Army (1914–1919)
- Service years: 1873–1919
- Rank: Vice-Admiral (Royal Navy); Colonel (British Army)
- Commands: HMS Alecto; HMS Hussar; HMS Gleaner; HMS Dido; HMS Proserpine; HMS Pomone; HMS Prometheus; HMS Pactolus; HMS Europa; HMS Kent; North of Ireland Coastguards; HMS Implacable; Portland Harbour; Base Commandant, Boulogne; Base Commandant, Dunkirk; British Troops, Paris
- Conflicts: First World War
- Awards: Companion of the Order of the Bath; Companion of the Order of St Michael and St George; Legion of Honour; Mentioned in despatches x 4

Vice-Admiral Gerald Charles Adolphe Marescaux CB CMG (10 February 1860 – 3 September 1920) was a Royal Navy and British Army officer. Having joined the navy in 1873, Marescaux spent the majority of his time as a junior officer serving on surveying duties. Promoted to commander in 1896, he served as captain of ships undergoing trials at Sheerness until 1900. He was promoted to captain in 1903 and held commands at home and on the China Station before, in 1910, he took command of the North of Ireland Coastguard. In 1913 he was made King's Harbour Master, Portland, and promoted to rear-admiral.

When the First World War began, Marescaux was too junior a rear-admiral to receive an active command, and so he had himself seconded to the War Office. Commissioned as a lieutenant-colonel, he served as landings officer at Le Havre before being appointed Deputy Assistant Quartermaster General at Boulogne in 1915. He retired from the navy in the same year. In 1917, Marescaux was appointed Base Commandant, Dunkirk, where he stayed until the Armistice of 11 November 1918, at which point he briefly commanded the British troops in Paris. He retired from the army in 1919 as a colonel and died in 1920 from a cerebral haemorrhage brought on by the frequent bombings of Dunkirk.

== Military service ==
=== Early career and surveying ===
Gerald Charles Adolphe Marescaux was born in London on 10 February 1860, the second son of Laurence M. Marescaux, an employee of the Agra Bank, and Grace Marescaux.

Marescaux joined the Royal Navy on 15 January 1873 as a naval cadet at HMS Britannia. Continuing his education as a cadet, Marescaux was sent to serve on the frigate HMS Agincourt, the flagship of the Channel Squadron, on 6 March 1875. He was promoted to midshipman on 19 January 1876 and joined the frigate HMS Raleigh in the Mediterranean Sea. Marescaux was subsequently appointed an acting sub-lieutenant on 17 January 1880 and sent to study at the Royal Naval College, Greenwich. He gained third-class certificates in seamanship, gunnery, and navigation before his rank was made permanent on 22 January 1881, backdated to 16 February the previous year.

At the same time as his promotion, Marescaux was sent to serve on the survey ship HMS Fawn. On 1 May 1883, Marescaux was moved from Fawn to serve in the paddle frigate HMS Valorous, which was on "particular service" (ie. not allocated to a fixed naval station). He stayed in the ship only briefly, as on 1 August the same year he was appointed to serve on the schooner HMS Sparrowhawk, another survey ship. Serving in the West Indies, Marescaux was promoted to lieutenant in Sparrowhawk on 31 December the same year.

Marescaux was transferred to the brig HMS Seaflower on 1 April 1886. Seaflower was the ship's tender to the training establishment HMS Boscawen at Portland. Marescaux subsequently served aboard the sloop HMS Egeria, surveying the islands of Tongatapu and ʻEua in Tonga. In October 1889, Egeria arrived at Fonuafoʻou, an island that had been created by a volcanic eruption four years earlier. Despite the ground being made of embers almost too hot to walk on, Marescaux led a landing party ashore. They took volcanic samples for the Hydrographer of the Navy and erected a flagpole 250 feet (76 m) above sea level and 20 yards (18 m) inland before returning to the ship. Soon after this, the island began to crumble away, and in three days the new flagpole fell into the sea.

Marescaux was appointed to the training brig HMS Pilot on 6 April the following year, but within a month was at the shore establishment HMS Excellent. On 18 January 1894, he was appointed to the ship of the line HMS Duke of Wellington (1852). From 21 January 1895, he had command of the gunboat HMS Alecto and was engaged in surveying the Calabar River and the Niger delta in the Colony and Protectorate of Nigeria. Alecto sailed from Bonny, Nigeria, on 17 October and arrived to continue "special service" at Sierra Leone and Accra on 13 November. Marescaux returned to England on board RMS Batanga, arriving at Liverpool on 7 September 1896. His African surveys were well received at the Admiralty, which rewarded him with a small pay increase.

=== First commands ===
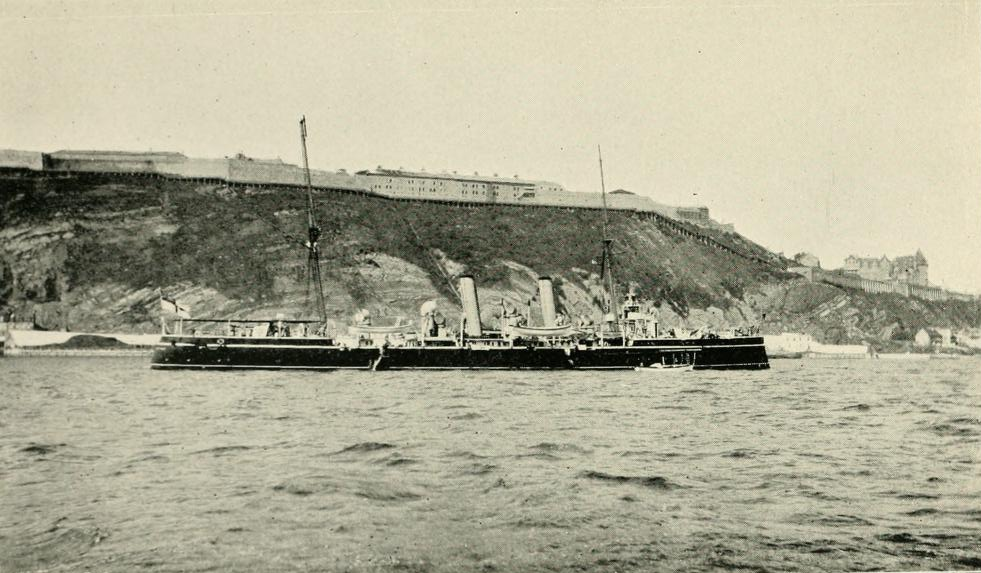
HMS Proserpine off Canada during Marescaux's period in command

Marescaux commissioned the torpedo gunboat HMS Hussar on 3 December 1896. He was given the command to take Hussar out to the Mediterranean. He was promoted to commander on 31 December, and early in the following year took Hussar out, at which point he was replaced in command by the captain of the torpedo gunboat HMS Gleaner. Marescaux took over Gleaner and returned her to Chatham, where the worn-out gunboat was paid off. Subsequently, at Queen Victoria's diamond jubilee fleet review on 26 June 1897, Marescaux commanded the protected cruiser HMS Dido. From 1898 he was in the Dockyard Reserve at Sheerness. As such he was used as the temporary captain of new ships undergoing trials. In June, he commanded the cruiser HMS Proserpine during that ship's coal consumption trials. In February 1899, he took charge of the protected cruiser HMS Pomone for her speed tests, and he commanded the protected cruiser HMS Prometheus during her coal consumption trials in July.

Marescaux received permanent command of Proserpine on 1 November 1900, initially serving on the North America and West Indies Station. The ship sailed from Newfoundland to return to Britain in late October 1901. Early in the morning of 7 November, Proserpine was anchored in heavy fog off Sheerness when the mail packet Koningen Regente collided with her bow. Koningen Regente's paddle box became stuck on Proserpine, and Marescaux used the connection to take the ship's sixty passengers on board Proserpine, after which Koningen Regente was beached off Garrison Point Fort. Marescaux became commander of the protected cruiser HMS Pactolus, part of the Channel Squadron, in 1902. In April Pactolus conveyed the torpedo boat destroyer HMS Flying Fish out to Gibraltar before returning to the Channel. Marescaux attended the coronation of Edward VII in August.

=== Senior positions ===
Promoted to captain on 31 December 1903, Marescaux was one of six captains appointed as umpires afloat for the combined tactical exercises and manoeuvres of the Channel Fleet and Home Fleet in August 1904. He was subsequently given command of the protected cruiser HMS Europa, based at Devonport, on 3 January 1905. Marescaux and Europa assisted with the trials of the armoured cruiser HMS Argyll in September 1905 and in late 1906 commanded the navigating party during trials of HMS Achilles, another armoured cruiser. He was still in command of Europa in January 1907, before on 6 June he was sent on a gunnery and torpedo course. Marescaux was then given command of the armoured cruiser HMS Kent, on the China Station, in November. He retained command of Kent until 1909. Returning to again command Europa, later in the year he was censured by the Admiralty for "most unsatisfactory conduct" after he interviewed his officer of the watch and signal bosun in his cabin while wearing only his pyjamas. He briefly commanded the Cruiser Division at Devonport in 1910.

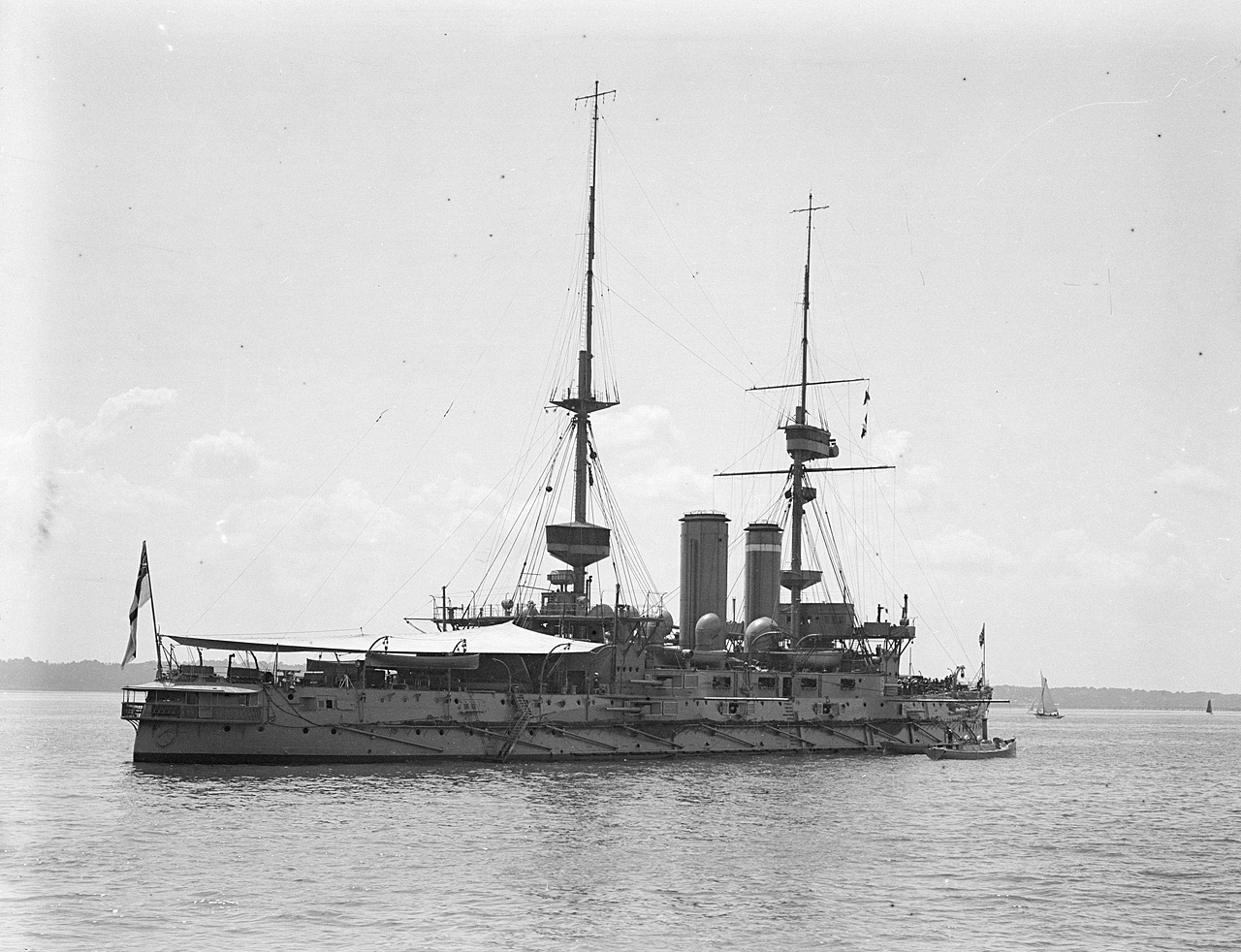
HMS Implacable, Marescaux's last sea-going command

Marescaux was appointed district captain of the North of Ireland Coastguard on 1 June 1910. The district spanned from County Clare to County Wexford. He relinquished his appointment with the coastguard on 3 June 1912, being appointed captain of the battleship HMS Implacable. On 30 July he was awarded a Royal Navy good service pension worth £150 a year. Implacable served as temporary flagship of the Second and Third Fleets in 1913, carrying Vice-Admiral Frederick Hamilton whilst HMS Queen underwent refit.

Marescaux was given command of Portland on 21 August that year, serving as both captain-in-charge and King's Harbour Master. Portland was the principal southern assembly point for the Home Fleets, and because of this importance the command was soon to become a rear-admiral's position. As the eighth most senior captain in the navy, Marescaux was given the role with the understanding that he would soon be promoted to flag rank. On 15 September he hosted the visiting Russian Admiral Nikolai Ottovich von Essen. He received his promotion to rear-admiral on 15 December and stayed at Portland until 21 April 1914.

=== First World War ===
When the First World War began in 1914 Marescaux was still a newly promoted rear-admiral and was thus very junior, having ten admirals immediately senior to him. This meant that he would be passed over for command vacancies in favour of more senior admirals, and so he requested that he be seconded to the War Office so that he could still see active service. As such, he was appointed a temporary lieutenant-colonel in the Reserve of Officers of the British Army on 8 November. In this new position he served through the year as Assistant Military Landing Officer at Le Havre before, on 28 May 1915, he was appointed Deputy Assistant Quartermaster General at Boulogne. Marescaux was mentioned in despatches by Field-Marshal Sir John French on 31 May, and was appointed a Companion of the Order of St Michael and St George on 3 June. He voluntarily retired from the Royal Navy on 4 November.

Marescaux continued at Boulogne, being appointed commandant on 23 April 1916. He was promoted to the temporary rank of colonel and made Base Commandant, Dunkirk, on 28 March 1917, by which time he had been transferred to the General List of officers. Marescaux was mentioned in despatches by Field-Marshal Douglas Haig on 9 April 1917, being then on the Special List of officers, on 7 April and 8 November 1918. Marescaux is described by the YMCA worker Alexander Irvine as a "splendid old seaman" in his autobiography A Yankee with the Soldiers of the King. He became an enthusiastic supporter of YMCA talks, organising them for units at Dunkirk and making speeches, including one to the United States Army Air Service:

"Boys...isn't it good to think that so many of our lads went over the top with these words ringing in their ears?"

In late 1918, Marescaux moved again, being given command of the British troops stationed in Paris for the Armistice. Marescaux reverted to the role of commandant on 27 January 1919. He relinquished his commission on 9 June, retaining use of the rank of colonel. During the war Marescaux had been made a Commander of the Legion of Honour by France.

=== Retirement and death ===
Appointed a Companion of the Order of the Bath on 1 January 1919, Marescaux was promoted to vice-admiral on the list of retired officers eight days later. He died of a cerebral haemorrhage brought on by the frequent bombings of Dunkirk while he was commandant there, at the Royal Naval Hospital, Chatham, on 3 September 1920, aged 60. He was buried on 8 September in Woodlands Cemetery, Gillingham, Kent. The pallbearers at his funeral included Admiral Sir Doveton Sturdee and Rear-Admiral Vivian Bernard.

== Personal life ==
Marescaux, then a lieutenant, married the portrait and flower painter Kathleen Dennis (1868–1944) on 19 September 1894 at St Canice's Cathedral, Kilkenny, Ireland. She would go on to paint a portrait of Marescaux that was exhibited at the Royal Hibernian Academy in 1895. Together the couple had two sons:

- Commander Geoffrey Dennis St. Quentin Marescaux de Saubruit, Royal Navy officer. Changed his surname to Marescaux de Saubruit in 1949.
- Lawrence Mortimer Tracton Marescaux

Marescaux was elected a member of the Royal Geographical Society on 28 June 1886. When posted to Ireland Marescaux and his wife made appearances at dinners with the Lord Lieutenant of Ireland and attended the court of George V at Dublin in 1911.

== Arms ==
Coat of arms of Gerald Marescaux

Notes
Confirmed by Sir Nevile Rodwell Wilkinson, 17 February 1935.
Crest
A dolphin naiant Gules.
Escutcheon
Quarterly 1st & 4th Argent in bend three eagles displayed Sable 2nd & 3rd Sable an anchor in pale Or timbered Azure the stem entwined by a dolphin descending Argent.
Motto
Tutus Per Utilus
