= Charles Hillyar =

Royal Navy Admiral (1817–1888)

Admiral Sir Charles Hillyar KCB
- Born: 1817; Totnes, Devon
- Died: 14 December 1888 (aged 70–71); Torpoint, Cornwall
- Military career
- Allegiance: United Kingdom
- Branch: Royal Navy
- Service years: 1831–1882
- Rank: Admiral
- Commands: HMS Gladiator; HMS Queen; HMS Octavia; East Indies & Cape of Good Hope Station; Pacific Station; China Station
- Conflicts: Crimean War
- Awards: Knight Commander of the Order of the Bath

Admiral Sir Charles Farrell Hillyar KCB (bapt. 19 December 1817 – 14 December 1888) was a Royal Navy admiral who went on to be Commander-in-Chief, China Station.

== Naval career ==
The son of Admiral Sir James Hillyar, Charles Hillyar joined the Royal Navy in 1831. Promoted to captain in 1852, he commanded HMS Gladiator in the Black Sea during the Crimean War. He commanded HMS Queen from 1859 and HMS Octavia from 1865.

Hillyar became Commander-in-Chief, East Indies and Cape of Good Hope in 1865, Commander-in-Chief, Pacific Station in 1872 and Commander-in-Chief, China Station in 1877. He was promoted to rear-admiral in 1867, vice-admiral in 1873 and admiral in 1878. He retired in 1882.

Hillyar was appointed a Companion of the Order of the Bath (CB) in the 1869 Birthday Honours and Knight Commander of the Order of the Bath (KCB) in the 1887 Golden Jubilee Honours.

Hillyar lived at Torre House at Torpoint in Cornwall.

== See also ==
- O'Byrne, William Richard (1849). "Hillyar, Charles Farrell" . A Naval Biographical Dictionary . John Murray – via Wikisource.

Military offices
Preceded by Frederick Montresor	Commander-in-Chief East Indies & Cape of Good Hope Station; 1865–1867	Succeeded by Sir Leopold Heath (East Indies Station); Sir William Dowell (Cape of Good Hope Station)
Preceded by Sir Arthur Farquhar	Commander-in-Chief, Pacific Station; 1872–1873	Succeeded by Sir Arthur Cochrane
Preceded by Sir Alfred Ryder	Commander-in-Chief, China Station; 1877–1878	Succeeded by Robert Coote
