= Admiral Adams =

Admiral Adams may refer to:

- Benjamin H. Adams (1888–1989), U.S. Navy rear admiral
- Charles Adam (1780–1853), British Royal Navy admiral
- Clinton E. Adams (fl. 1980s–2020s), U.S. Navy rear admiral
- John Adams (Royal Navy officer, died 2008) (1918–2008), British Royal Navy rear admiral
- John Adams (Royal Navy officer, died 1866) (1798–1866), British Royal Navy rear admiral
- Richard D. Adams (1909–1987), U.S. Navy rear admiral
- Sandra E. Adams (born 1956), U.S. Navy rear admiral
