= Jack of Spades (2027 film) =

Upcoming mystery film

- Directed by: Joel Coen
- Screenplay by: Joel Coen; Ethan Coen; Eleanor Catton; Conor McPherson
- Based on: The Alien: A Story of Middle Age by F. F. Montrésor
- Produced by: Joel Coen; Frances McDormand; Steven Rales; Graham Broadbent; Peter Czernin; Robert Graf
- Starring: Josh O'Connor; Patsy Ferran; Frances McDormand; Lesley Manville; Damian Lewis
- Cinematography: Bruno Delbonnel
- Music by: Carter Burwell
- Production companies: Indian Paintbrush; Blueprint Pictures
- Distributed by: Netflix
- Release date: 2027
- Country: United States
- Language: English

Jack of Spades is an upcoming American Gothic mystery film directed, produced, and co-written by Joel Coen. The screenplay is written by Coen, his brother Ethan, Eleanor Catton, and Conor McPherson, and is adapted from F. F. Montrésor's 1901 novel The Alien: A Story of Middle Age. The film stars Josh O'Connor, Patsy Ferran, Frances McDormand, Lesley Manville, and Damian Lewis.

It will be theatrically released in the United States in fall of 2027 by Netflix, followed by a streaming release on the platform later that year.

== Synopsis ==
The film is described as a gothic period mystery set in late 19th century Scotland.

== Cast ==
- Josh O'Connor
- Patsy Ferran
- Frances McDormand
- Lesley Manville
- Damian Lewis

== Production ==
At the 2025 Cannes Film Festival, it was revealed that Joel Coen would be directing a film titled Jack of Spades starring Josh O'Connor. It was reported Frances McDormand, Lesley Manville, and Damian Lewis would also feature in the film. The film is based on the 1901 novel The Alien: A Story of Middle Age by F. F. Montrésor, and the screenplay was adapted by Coen and his brother Ethan, Eleanor Catton, as well as Conor McPherson. Coen also turned to frequent collaborators Bruno Delbonnel for cinamatography, and Carter Burwell for the score.

Coen was in Scotland in June 2025 ahead of shooting, and principal photography began in September 2025 with plans to run through October. Filming took place in Scotland with some scenes shot in Paisley, Edinburgh, Culross, and Glasgow, where extensive road closures were required in and around the Glasgow city centre. The cities and towns were set up as if they were in the 1800s for on-location scenes. In a British Vogue interview in November the same year, O'Connor revealed that filming on the film had wrapped.

== Release ==
In August 2026, Variety reported that the movie had been screened for potential buyers, in a nearly 150 minutes long cut and a "tighter second version". An acquisition announcement was expected to come "sooner rather than later", according to the magazine.

In November 2026, Netflix acquired distribution rights to the film, planning to theatrically release it in fall of 2027 during awards season before a streaming release on the service.
