= 1st Destroyer Flotilla =

- Active: 1907; formal July 1909–July 1940, 1947-1951
- Country: United Kingdom
- Branch: Royal Navy
- Size: Flotilla
- Engagements: World War I: Battle of Heligoland Bight (1914); Battle of Dogger Bank (1915); Battle of Jutland; World War II

Commanders
- First: Commodore Edward F. B. Charlton
- Last: Captain Michael S. Townsend

The 1st Destroyer Flotilla, also styled as the First Destroyer Flotilla, was a naval formation of the British Royal Navy from 1909 to 1940 and again from 1947 to 1951.

== History ==
=== Pre-war history ===
In May 1906, the First Destroyer Flotilla was attached to the Channel Fleet. The flotilla was attached alongside the 2nd and 3rd Destroyer Flotillas. Between February and August 1907, it was stationed in Portsmouth until being reassigned to the Channel Fleet. In February 1909 the flotilla was transferred to the 1st Division of the Home Fleet. On 27 July 1909, it was placed under the command of Commodore Edward F. B. Charlton until 1910. From May 1912 to July 1914 the flotilla was allocated to the First Fleet of the Home Fleet.

=== World War I ===
At the outbreak of war in July, 1914, the First Destroyer Flotilla was part of the First Fleet and was composed of 20 destroyers, 1 depot ship, and 1 scout cruiser. In August 1914 it was grouped with two other flotillas to form the Harwich Force as part of the Grand Fleet, under the command of Reginald Tyrwhitt, until November 1916. The flotilla was next assigned to the Harwich Force where it remained until April 1917. From May 1917 until December 1918 it was in the Portsmouth Command.

After World War One the flotilla was assigned to the Atlantic Fleet from November 1918 to April 1925. In 1925 it was re-designated 5th Destroyer Flotilla and assigned to its first overseas station as part of the Mediterranean Fleet until 1932. It was renamed back to the 1st Destroyer Flotilla still with the Med Fleet until August 1938.

=== World War II ===
At the beginning of World War Two in September 1939, the flotilla was placed under the command of the Rear-Admiral, Destroyer Flotillas Mediterranean Fleet where it remained until July 1940 when it was moved to the Portsmouth Command, till May 1945. Post the Second World War the Flotilla was reformed again as part of the Mediterranean Fleet in July 1945 until October 1951 when it was renamed 1st Destroyer Squadron.

Command structure organizational changes took place within the Royal Navy during the post-war period. The term Flotilla was previously applied to a tactical unit until 1951 which led to the creation of three specific Flag Officers, Flotillas responsible for the Eastern, Home and Mediterranean fleets. The existing destroyer flotillas were re-organized now as administrative squadrons.

== Operational deployments ==
Assigned to	Dates	Notes
Channel Fleet	March 1907 to February 1909	
Home Fleet, 1st Division	March 1909 to April 1912	
Home Fleets, First Fleet	May 1912 to July 1914	
Grand Fleet	August 1914 to November 1916	
Harwich Force	November 1916 to April 1917	
Portsmouth Command	April 1917 to November 1918	
Atlantic Fleet	November 1918 to- April 1925	renumbered 5DF
Mediterranean Fleet	September 1939 to July 1940	
Portsmouth Command	July 1940 to May 1945	
Mediterranean Fleet	July 1945 to October 1951	

== Administration ==
In the Royal Navy, a Captain (D) afloat or Captain Destroyers afloat is an operational commander responsible for the command of destroyer flotilla or squadron.

=== Captains (D) afloat 1st Destroyer Flotilla ===
Incomplete list of post holders included:

Captain (D) afloat 1st Destroyer Flotilla
	Rank	Name	Term	Notes
1	Commodore	Edward F. B. Charlton	27 July 1909 – after 27 June 1910	
2	Commodore 2nd class	Sir Robert K. Arbuthnot	29 November 1910 – 1 May 1912	later R.Adm.
3	Captain	Arthur R. Hulbert	10 May 1912 – 12 January 1913	
4	Captain	Thomas L. Shelford	20 January 1913	
5	Captain	William F. Blunt	25 April 1913 – 25 July 1915	(later R.Adm)
6	Captain	Charles D. Roper	27 July 1915 – 8 June 1916	
7	Captain	Brien M. Money	1 March 1919 – 4 April 1919	
8	Captain	George W. McO. Campbell	4 April 1919 – 1 December 1920	(later V. Adm)
9	Captain	Arthur K. Betty	1 December 1920 – 19 December 1922	
10	Captain	Andrew B. Cunningham	19 December 1922 – 1 July 1924	(later Adm. of the Fleet)
11	Captain	Kenneth MacLeod	1 July 1924 – 1 April 1925	
12	Captain	James V. Creagh	7 July 1925 – October, 1927	
13	Captain	John H. K. Clegg	11 October 1927 – 7 December 1929	
14	Captain	Alan R. Dewar	6 November 1929 – 10 December 1931	(later R.Adm)
15	Captain	Edward B. Cloete	10 December 1931 – December, 1932	
16	Captain	Charles F. Harris	12 December 1932 - 18 May 1936	
17	Captain	Charles M. Blackman	18 May 1936 - 25 June 1940	
18	Captain	Augustine W. S. Agar	25 June 1940 – 13 July 1940	(later Cmdre.) flotilla disbanded
19	Captain	R. Dymock Watson	1947 - October 1948	flotilla reformed
20	Captain	John E.H. McBeath	October 1948 - April 1950	
21	Captain	Michael S. Townsend	April 1950 - October 1951	flotilla renamed 1st Destroyer Squadron

== Sources ==
- Halpern, Paul (2016). The Mediterranean Fleet, 1919–1929. Cambridge, England: Routledge. ISBN 9781317024163.
- Harley, Simon; Lovell, Tony. (2018) "First Destroyer Flotilla (Royal Navy) - The Dreadnought Project". www.dreadnoughtproject.org. Harley and Lovell.
- Watson, Dr Graham. (2015) Royal Navy Organisation and Ship Deployments 1900-1914". www.naval-history.net. G. Smith.
- Watson, Dr Graham. (2015) "Royal Navy Organisation and Ship Deployment, Inter-War Years 1914-1918". www.naval-history.net. Gordon Smith.
- Watson, Dr Graham. (2015) "Royal Navy Organisation in World War 2, 1939-1945". www.naval-history.net. Gordon Smith.
