= Kemmis =

Kemmis is a surname and a masculine given name of British origin. Notable people with the name include:

== Surname ==
- Anchilee Scott-Kemmis (born 1999) Thai-Australian model
- Daniel Kemmis (born 1945), American author and politician
- James Kemmis (1751–1820), British Army officer
- John Kemmis (1867–1942), Canadian politician

== Given name ==
- Arthur Kemmis Betty (1877–1961), British Royal Navy officer
