= Frederick Montresor =

Royal Navy Admiral (c. 1811–1887)

Admiral Frederick Montresor
- Born: c. 1811
- Died: 15 December 1887
- Military career
- Allegiance: United Kingdom
- Branch: Royal Navy
- Rank: Admiral
- Commands: HMS Calypso; HMS Severn; East Indies & Cape of Good Hope Station

Admiral Frederick Byng Montresor (c. 1811 – 15 December 1887) was a Royal Navy officer who went on to be Commander-in-Chief, East Indies & Cape of Good Hope Station.

== Naval career ==
Montresor was made a lieutenant in the Royal Navy in 1835.

He was promoted to captain in 1857, he took command of HMS Calypso and sailed to Esquimalt in August 1858 to deal with American miners causing commotion in the Fraser River area.

In 1862, he transferred to the command of HMS Severn before being appointed Commander-in-Chief, East Indies & Cape of Good Hope Station in January 1865.

He was promoted to rear-admiral in 1867, and retired in 1870. In 1873, while on the retired list, he was further promoted to retired vice-admiral.

== Family ==
He was son of General Thomas Gage Montresor, grandson of John Montresor and nephew of Henry Tucker Montresor. In 1851, he married Emily Delafield. Their children included the novelist Frances Frederica Montresor.

== See also ==
- O'Byrne, William Richard (1849). "Montresor, Frederick Byng" . A Naval Biographical Dictionary . John Murray – via Wikisource.

Military offices
Preceded by Sir George King (East Indies and China Station); Sir Baldwin Walker (Cape of Good Hope Station)	Commander-in-Chief East Indies & Cape of Good Hope Station; 1865	Succeeded by Sir Charles Hillyar
