= George Alexander Waters =

Captain George Alexander Waters
- Born: c. 1820
- Died: 1903 (aged 82–83)
- Buried: Kensal Green Cemetery
- Allegiance: United Kingdom
- Branch: Royal Navy
- Rank: Captain

Captain George Alexander Waters (c. 1820-1903) was a British Navy officer.

He served on the Vixen, the Jupiter, the Simoom, and the Shannon, which he first commanded while Sir William Peel led the Naval Brigade, before taking permanent command.

He was later Queen's Harbour Master, firstly at Malta and finally at Sheerness, before retiring in 1876.

He is buried at Kensal Green Cemetery.
