= Christopher Wyvill (Royal Navy officer) =

Rear-Admiral Christopher Wyvill
- Born: 6 May 1792
- Died: 29 January 1863 (aged 70); Bedale
- Military career
- Allegiance: United Kingdom
- Branch: Royal Navy
- Rank: Rear-Admiral
- Conflicts: Greek War of Independence

Rear-Admiral Christopher Wyvill (6 May 1792 – 29 January 1863) was a senior Royal Navy officer who served as Commander-in-Chief, Africa from 1849 to 1853.

== Naval career ==
Wyvill joined the Royal Navy on 25 October 1805. He saw action at Grabusa in 1828 during the Greek War of Independence. Promoted to captain on 22 February 1832, he was given command of the sixth-rate, HMS Cleopatra, in 1841 and went on to serve as Commander-in-Chief, Africa from 1849 to 1853 and Superintendent of the Chatham Dockyard from 1854 to 1856. He was promoted to Rear-Admiral of the Red on 8 November 1860.
