= Edward Robinson (VC) =

Edward Robinson VC
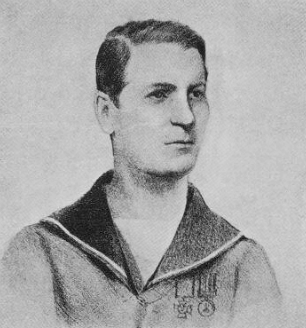
- Born: 17 June 1838; Portsea, Portsmouth, Hampshire
- Died: 2 October 1896 (aged 58); Windsor Castle estate (Great Park), Windsor, Berkshire
- Burial place: Old Windsor Church Road Cemetery
- Military career
- Allegiance: United Kingdom
- Branch: Royal Navy
- Rank: Able Seaman
- Units: HMS Shannon
- Conflicts: Indian Mutiny
- Awards: Victoria Cross

Edward Robinson VC (17 June 1838 – 2 October 1896) was an English recipient of the Victoria Cross, the highest and most prestigious award for gallantry in the face of the enemy that can be awarded to British and Commonwealth forces.

== Details ==
Robinson was 19 years old, and an able seaman in the Royal Navy, serving in the Naval Brigade from HMS Shannon during the Indian Mutiny when the following deed took place for which he was awarded the VC:

For conspicuous bravery, in having at Lucknow, on the 13th of March, 1858, under a heavy musketry fire, within fifty yards, jumped on the sand bags of a battery, and extinguished a fire among them. He was dangerously wounded in performing this service.

== The medal ==
His Victoria Cross is displayed at the National Maritime Museum in Greenwich, London.
