= Nowell Salmon =

Royal Navy Admiral of the Fleet (1835–1912)

Admiral of the Fleet Sir Nowell Salmon VC GCB
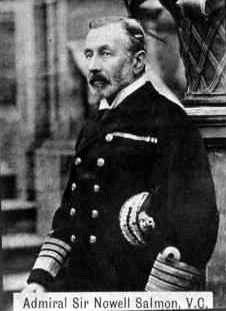
- Admiral Sir Nowell Salmon c. 1890s
- Born: 20 February 1835; Swarraton, Hampshire
- Died: 14 February 1912 (aged 76); Southsea, Hampshire
- Burial place: St Peter's Churchyard, Curdridge
- Military career
- Allegiance: United Kingdom
- Branch: Royal Navy
- Service years: 1847–1905
- Rank: Admiral of the Fleet
- Commands: Portsmouth Command; China Station; Cape of Good Hope Station; HMS Swiftsure; HMS Valiant; HMS Defence; HMS Icarus
- Conflicts: Crimean War; Indian Mutiny
- Awards: Victoria Cross; Knight Grand Cross of the Order of the Bath

Admiral of the Fleet Sir Nowell Salmon, VC, GCB (20 February 1835 – 14 February 1912) was a Royal Navy officer. As a junior officer he served in the naval brigade and took part in the Siege of Lucknow during the Indian Mutiny. He was a member of the force defending the Residency when he volunteered to climb a tree near the wall of the Shah Nujeff mosque to observe the fall of shot, despite being under fire himself and wounded in the thigh. He and his colleague, Leading Seaman John Harrison, were awarded the Victoria Cross, the highest award for gallantry in the face of the enemy that can be awarded to British and Commonwealth forces for this action.

A few years later Salmon was dispatched from British Honduras (now Belize) to take custody of William Walker, an American citizen who had briefly been president of Nicaragua, but who was now attempting further conquests in Central America. The British Government regarded Walker as a menace to its own affairs in the region. Salmon captured Walker and delivered him to the authorities in Honduras, who promptly had him court-martialed and executed.

Salmon went on to be Commander-in-Chief, Cape of Good Hope and West Coast of Africa Station, then Commander-in-Chief, China Station and finally Commander-in-Chief, Portsmouth.

== Early career ==
Salmon was the son of Reverend Henry Salmon, Rector of Swarraton and Emily Salmon (daughter of Admiral William Nowell), Salmon was educated at Marlborough College and joined the Royal Navy as cadet in May 1847. Promoted to midshipman, he was appointed to the second-rate HMS James Watt in the Baltic Sea in March 1854 and saw action during the Crimean War. Promoted to lieutenant on 5 January 1856, he joined the gunboat HMS Ant in March 1856 before transferring to the frigate HMS Shannon on the East Indies Station later that year. He served in the naval brigade and took part in the Siege of Lucknow in November 1857 during the Indian Mutiny. He was a member of the force defending the Residency when he volunteered to climb a tree near the wall of the Shah Nujeff mosque to observe the fall of shot, despite being under fire himself and wounded in the thigh. He and his colleague, Leading Seaman John Harrison, were awarded the Victoria Cross. His citation reads:

Date of Act of Bravery, 16 November 1857 For conspicuous gallantry at Lucknow, on the 16 November 1857, in climbing up a tree, touching the angle of the Shah Nujjiff, to reply to the fire of the enemy, for which most dangerous service, the late Captain Peel, K.C.B., had called for volunteers.

Salmon took part in the Recapture of Lucknow in March 1858 and was promoted to commander on 22 March 1858. He became commanding officer of the sloop HMS Icarus on the North America and West Indies Station in November 1859. In 1860, Salmon was dispatched from British Honduras (now Belize) to take custody of William Walker, an American citizen who had briefly been president of Nicaragua, but who was now attempting further conquests in Central America. The British Government regarded Walker as a menace to its own affairs in the region. Salmon captured Walker and delivered him to the authorities in Honduras, who promptly had him court-martialed and shot.

Promoted to captain on 12 December 1863, Salmon became commanding officer of the ironclad warship HMS Defence in the Mediterranean Fleet in March 1869 and then commanded the ironclad warship HMS Valiant under the Commander-in-Chief, Queenstown in Ireland in April 1874. He was appointed a Companion of the Order of the Bath on 29 May 1875 and made a naval aide-de-camp to the Queen on 12 December that same year, before becoming commanding officer of the battleship HMS Swiftsure in the Mediterranean Fleet on 28 November 1877.

== Senior command ==
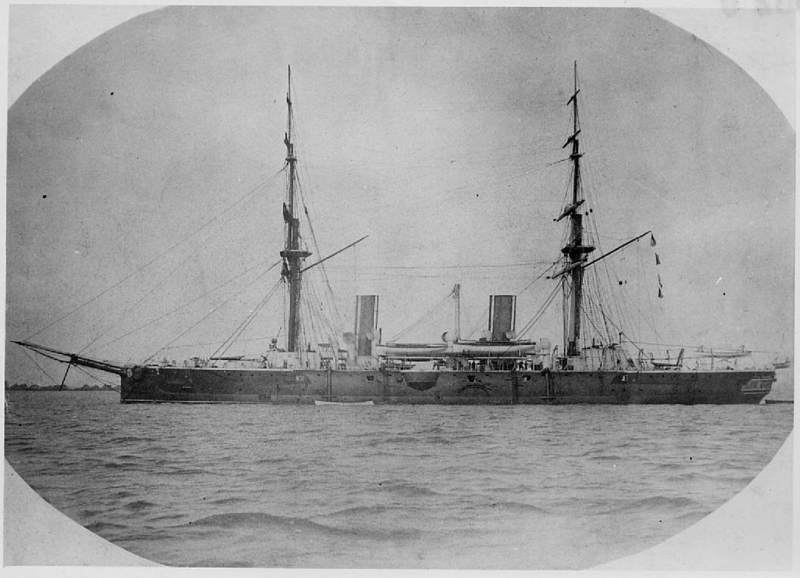
The armoured cruiser HMS Imperieuse, Salmon's flagship as Commander-in-Chief, China

Promoted to rear admiral on 2 August 1879, Salmon became Commander-in-Chief, Cape of Good Hope and West Coast of Africa Station, with his flag in the corvette HMS Boadicea, in April 1882. Promoted to vice admiral on 1 July 1885, he was advanced to Knight Commander of the Order of the Bath on 21 June 1887. He went on to be Commander-in-Chief, China Station, with his flag in the armoured cruiser HMS Imperieuse, in December 1887.

Salmon was promoted to full admiral on 10 September 1891, and became Commander-in-Chief, Portsmouth in June 1894. He was advanced to Knight Grand Cross of the Order of the Bath on 22 June 1897, and led Queen Victoria's Diamond Jubilee Review at Spithead on 26 June. He was appointed First and Principal Naval Aide-de-camp to the Queen on 23 August 1897. Promoted to admiral of the fleet on 13 January 1899, he retired in February 1905, died at his home in Southsea on 14 February 1912 and was buried at St Peter's Churchyard in Curdridge.

Salmon's Victoria Cross is on display in the Lord Ashcroft Gallery at the Imperial War Museum in London.

== Family ==
In January 1866 Salmon married Emily Augusta Saunders; they had a son and a daughter.

== Sources ==
- Heathcote, Tony (2002). The British Admirals of the Fleet 1734 – 1995. Pen & Sword Ltd. ISBN 0-85052-835-6.
- Scroggs, William O. (1916). Filibusters and Financiers; the story of William Walker and his associates. New York: The Macmillan Company.

Military offices
Preceded by Sir Frederick Richards	Commander-in-Chief, Cape of Good Hope Station; 1882–1885	Succeeded by Sir Walter Hunt-Grubbe
Preceded by Sir Richard Hamilton	Commander-in-Chief, China Station; 1887–1890	Succeeded by Sir Frederick Richards
Preceded by The Earl of Clanwilliam	Commander-in-Chief, Portsmouth; 1894–1897	Succeeded by Sir Michael Culme-Seymour
Honorary titles
Preceded by Sir Algernon Lyons	First and Principal Naval Aide-de-Camp; 1897–1899	Succeeded by Sir Michael Culme-Seymour, Bt.
