= HMS Shannon (1855) =

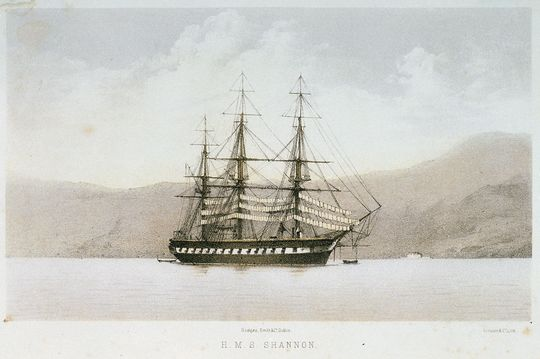
- HMS Shannon

History

United Kingdom
- Name: Shannon
- Ordered: 4 April 1851
- Builder: Portsmouth Dockyard; Machinery by John Penn & Sons
- Laid down: January 1854
- Launched: 24 November 1855
- Completed: By 29 December 1856
- Fate: Sold on 31 May 1871

General characteristics
- Class & type: Liffey-class steam frigate
- Displacement: 3,915 tons
- Tons burthen: 2,651 bm; 2,667 bm as completed
- Length: 285 ft (87 m) (length overall); 235 ft 1 in (71.65 m) (gundeck); 203 ft 10 in (62.13 m) (keel)
- Beam: 50 ft 1.5 in (15.278 m)
- Depth of hold: 18 ft 4.5 in (5.601 m)
- Installed power: 600 nominal horsepower; 2,125 ihp (1,585 kW)
- Propulsion: 2-cyl. trunked single expansion; Single screw
- Sail plan: Full-rigged ship
- Speed: 11.5 kn (21.3 km/h) under steam
- Complement: 560
- Armament: Middle deck: 30 × 8 in (65 cwt) shell guns; Upper deck: 20 × 32-pdr (56 cwt); 1 × 68-pdr (95 cwt) guns on upperdeck pivot

HMS Shannon was a Liffey-class steam frigate of the Royal Navy.

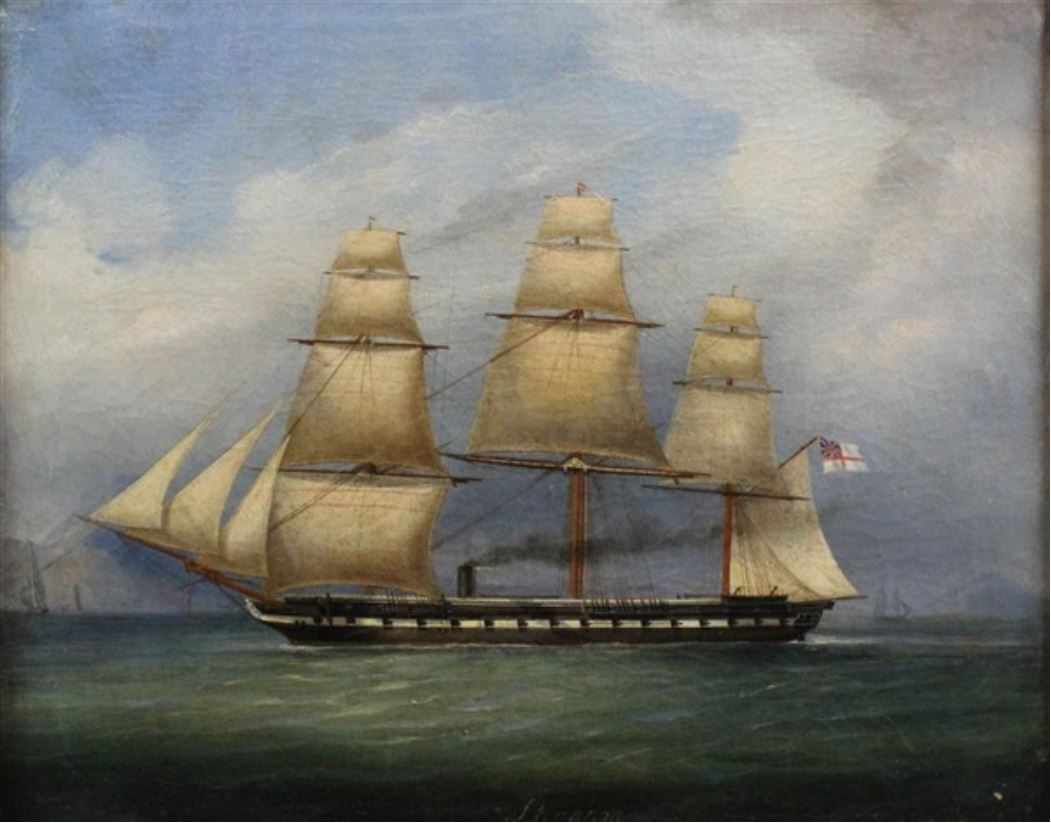
HMS Shannon

She was originally ordered as a sail driven Leander-class frigate,. but was re-ordered as screw frigate on 4 April 1851. She was built at Portsmouth Dockyard and launched on 24 November 1855. She was completed by 29 December 1856 with her hull having cost £62,759, her machinery £37,325, and a further £27,079 spent on fitting out.

Under the command of Sir William Peel, Shannon played an important role in the Indian Mutiny landing a naval brigade which fought at the Siege of Lucknow, including the Storming of the Sikandar Bagh. Five Victoria Crosses were won by the following crew of HMS Shannon: Lieutenant Thomas Young, Lieutenant Nowell Salmon, Leading Seaman John Harrison, Able Seaman Edward Robinson and Able Seaman William Hall, the first Black person and the first Canadian sailor to be awarded a Victoria Cross. Peel was wounded in the leg during the second relief of Lucknow, and was brought to Cawnpore, where he died of smallpox, having commanded Shannon's naval brigade during the campaign.

Captain George Alexander Waters took temporary command while Peel led the naval brigade, before taking permanent command until 1861.

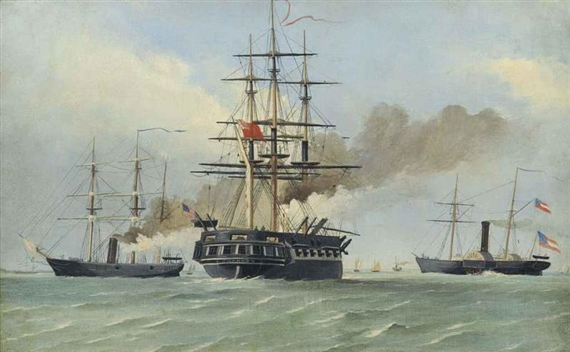
Shannon enforcing International Law between the Union gunboat Tuscarora and the Confederate blockade-runner Thomas L. Wragg in Southampton Water, 1862

Shannon was sold to Castle on 31 May 1871 to be broken up.
