= John Harrison (VC 1857) =

Irish recipient of the Victoria Cross (1832–1865)

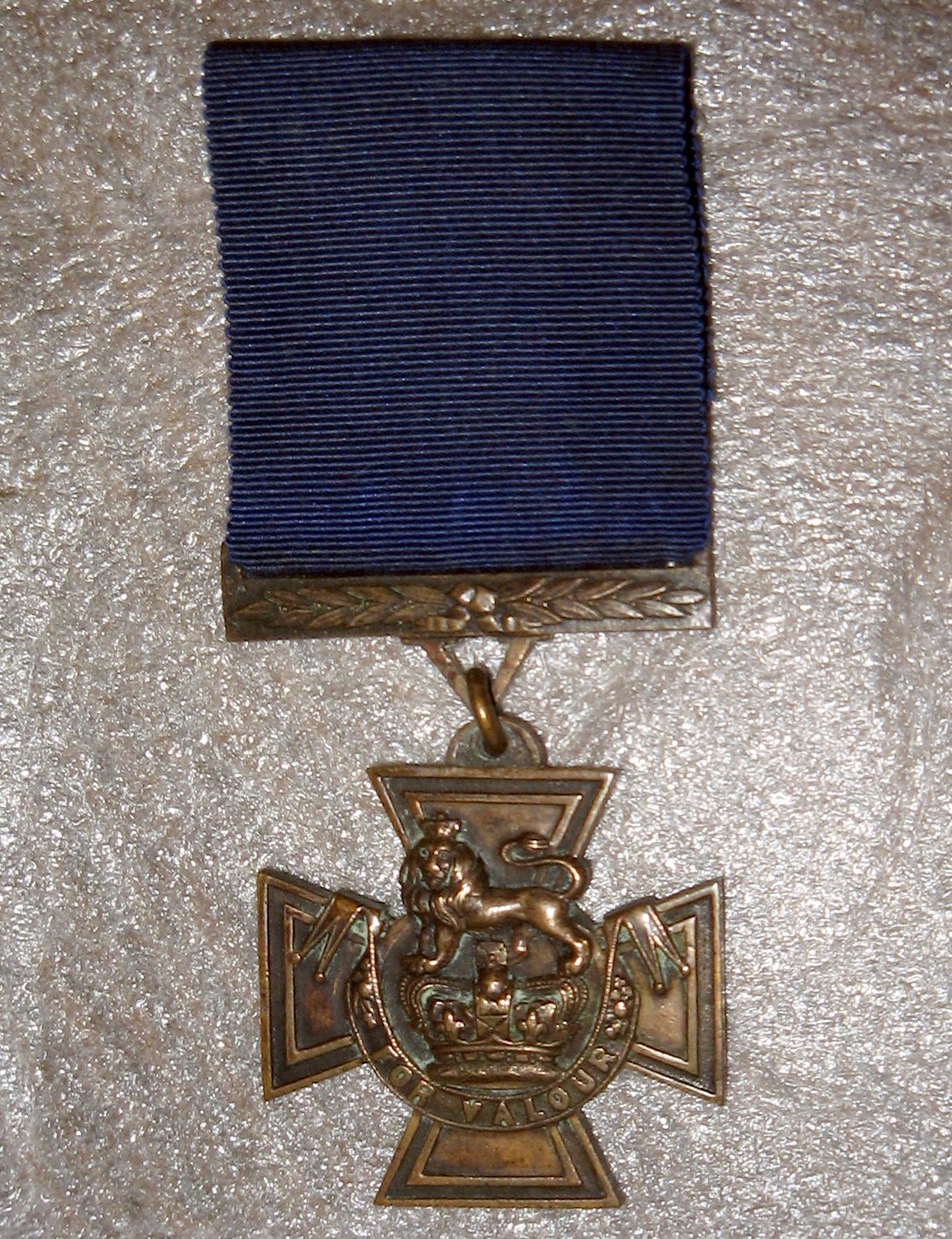
- Born: 24 January 1832; Castleboro, County Wexford
- Died: 27 December 1865 (aged 33); Westminster, London
- Burial place: Brompton Cemetery
- Military career
- Allegiance: United Kingdom
- Branch: Royal Navy
- Service years: 1850–1859
- Rank: Boatswain's Mate
- Units: HMS Shannon
- Conflicts: Crimean War; Indian Mutiny; Second Anglo-Chinese War
- Awards: Victoria Cross

John Harrison VC (24 January 1832 – 27 December 1865) was an Irish recipient of the Victoria Cross, the highest award for gallantry in the face of the enemy that can be awarded to British and Commonwealth forces.

== Early life ==
Harrison was born in Castleboro, County Wexford; he joined the Royal Navy as a Boy Second Class in 1850.

== Details ==
Harrison was 25 years old, and a Leading Seaman in the Royal Navy, (Naval Brigade) from HMS Shannon during the Indian Mutiny when the following deed took place on 16 November 1857 at Lucknow, India for which he and Nowell Salmon were awarded the VC:

For conspicuous gallantry at Lucknow, on the 16th of November, 1857, in climbing up a tree, touching the angle of the Shah Nujjiff, to reply to the fire of the enemy, for which most dangerous service, the late Captain Peel, K.C.B., had called for volunteers.

== Later life ==
Harrison later achieved the rank of Boatswain's Mate in 1858 and left the navy in 1859. He obtained a post in Customs and Excise but a wound sustained during the relief of Lucknow affected his health. He died unmarried at his home 5 Stafford Place, Westminster on 27 December 1865 and is buried at Brompton Cemetery, West London.

== The medal ==
Harrison's Victoria Cross is displayed at the National Maritime Museum in Greenwich, London.
