= John Adams (Royal Navy officer, died 1866) =

Senior Royal Navy officer (1798–1866)

Rear-Admiral John Adams
- Born: February 1798
- Died: 17 December 1866 (aged 68); Weston-super-Mare
- Military career
- Allegiance: United Kingdom
- Branch: Royal Navy
- Rank: Rear-Admiral

Rear-Admiral John Adams (February 1798 – 17 December 1866) was a senior Royal Navy officer who served as Commander-in-Chief, Africa from 1854 to 1857.

== Naval career ==
Adams joined the Royal Navy on 8 June 1806. Promoted to captain on 18 December 1843, he was given command of the frigate, HMS Gladiator, in 1850 and went on to serve as Commander-in-Chief, Africa from 1854 to 1857.

He married Mary Anne Gerard in 1838. After she died in 1843, he married Elizabeth Hurst in 1846.
