= HMS Proserpine (1896) =

Pelorus-class cruiser

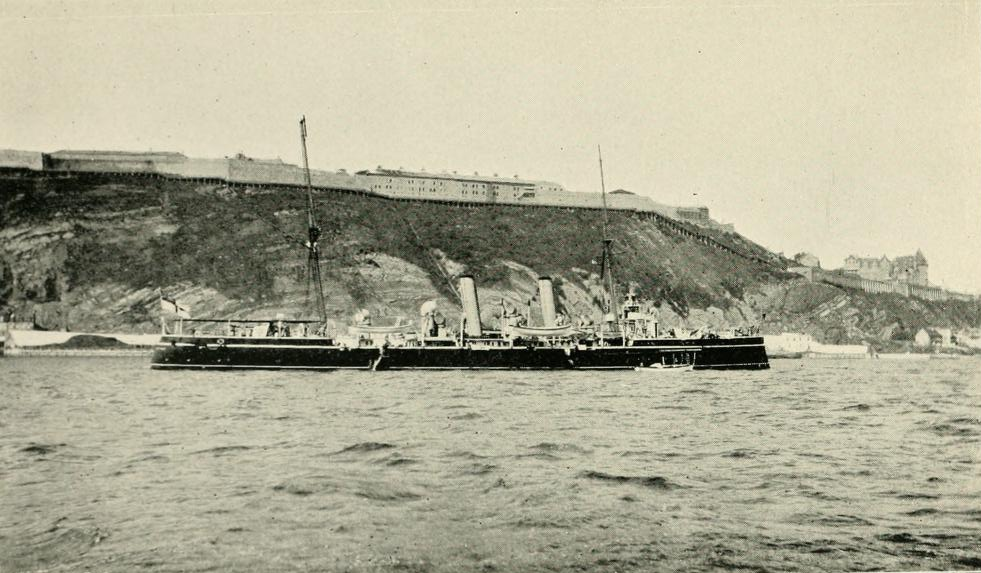
- HMS Proserpine at Quebec City in 1901

History

United Kingdom
- Name: HMS Proserpine
- Builder: Sheerness Dockyard
- Laid down: March 1896
- Launched: 5 December 1896
- Christened: Lady Nicholson
- Fate: Sold for scrap, 30 November 1919

General characteristics
- Class & type: Pelorus-class cruiser
- Displacement: 2,135 long tons (2,169 t)
- Length: 313 ft 6 in (95.55 m) o/a; 300 ft (91 m) p/p
- Beam: 36 ft 6 in (11.13 m)
- Draught: 16 ft (4.9 m)
- Propulsion: Triple expansion engine, 2 shafts, 5,000 ihp (3,728 kW)
- Speed: 20 knots (37 km/h; 23 mph)
- Complement: 224
- Armament: 8 × QF 4 in (100 mm) guns; 8 × QF 3-pounder guns; 2 × 18-inch (450 mm) torpedo tubes
- Armour: Deck: 1 1/2–2 in (38–51 mm) deck; Gunshields: 1/4 in (6.4 mm); Conning tower: 3 in (76 mm)

HMS Proserpine was a Pelorus-class cruiser of the Royal Navy. There were eleven "Third class" protected cruisers in the class, which was designed by Sir William White. While well armed for their size, they were primarily workhorses for the overseas fleet on "police" duties and did not serve with the main battlefleet.

They displaced 2,135 tons, had a crew complement of 224 men and were armed with eight QF 4 inch (102 mm) (25 pounder) guns, eight 3 pounder guns, three machine guns, and two 18 inch (457 mm) torpedo tubes. With reciprocating triple expansion engines and a variety of boilers, the top speed was 20 knots (37 km/h).

== Service history ==
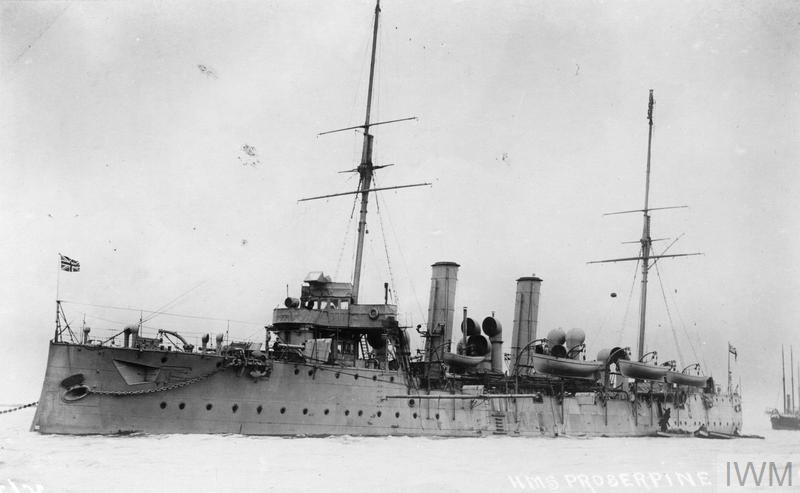
Protected cruiser HMS Proserpine in WWI

HMS Proserpine was laid down at Sheerness Dockyard in March 1896, and launched on 5 December 1896 when she was christened by Lady Nicholson, wife of Sir Henry Nicholson, Commander-in-Chief at The Nore.

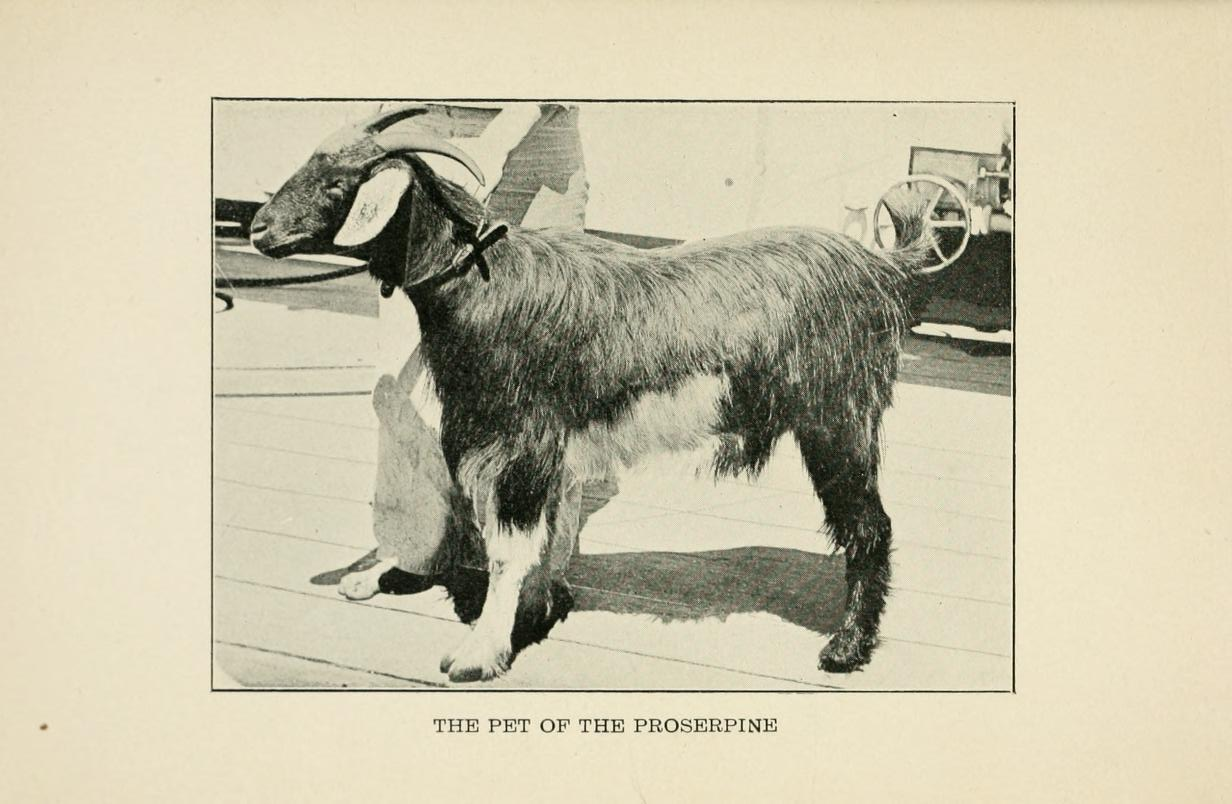
HMS Proserpine - the pet of the Proserpine 1901

Captain John Locke Marx was appointed in command in September 1898, for service on the North America and West Indies Station, which had headquarters at Bermuda and (during summer) Halifax. In March 1900 she visited Nassau, Bahamas to assist HMS Hermes, stranded there with a broken shaft. Commander Gerald Charles Adolphe Marescaux was appointed in command in October 1900. She returned to pay off at Chatham in early November 1901. Shortly after returning home, she was involved in a collision while she was anchored off Sheerness harbour. The Royal Zeeland Steamship Company mailboat Koningen Regentes struck the bow of Proserpine, leaving slight damage to both vessels. She was subsequently taken to Chatham Dockyard for repairs, and paid off at the naval base there 28 November 1901.

East Indies Station 1904–12, Mediterranean 1913. Returned to the UK, joined the 3rd Fleet 1913–14, 7th Channel Cruiser Squadron 1914.

Sent to the Mediterranean, East Indies and Egypt 1914-18 and finally the Red Sea 1918 to blockade Somalia, and gun running prevention in the Persian Gulf.

Sold for scrap on 30 November 1919, at Alexandria 1919 and broken up at Genoa.
