= HMS Pactolus (1896) =

Pelorus-class cruiser

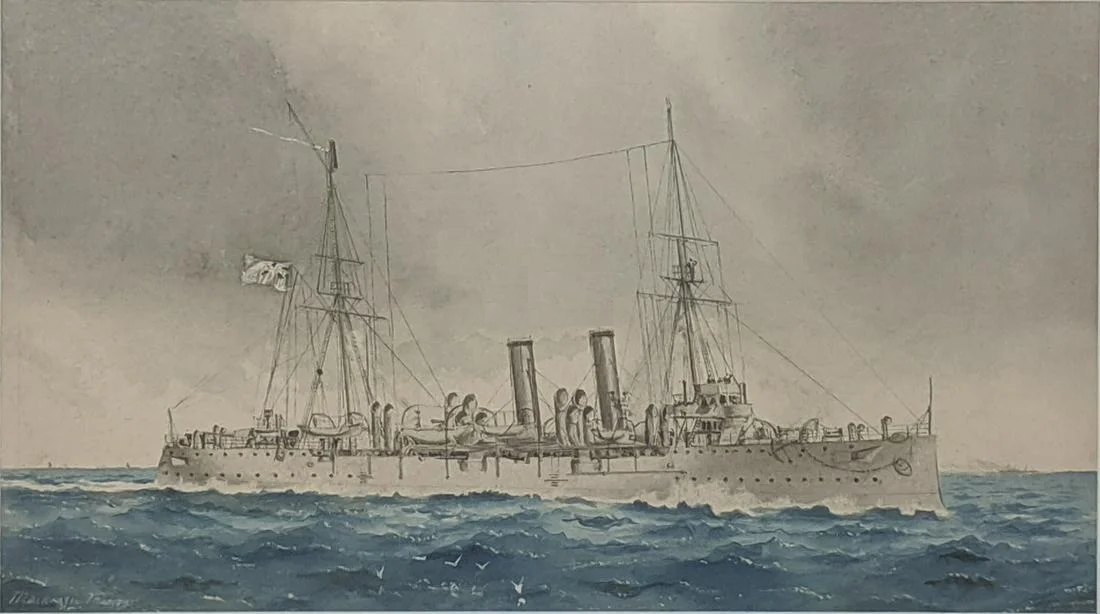
- Pactolus

History

United Kingdom
- Name: Pactolus
- Builder: Armstrong, Elswick
- Laid down: May 1896
- Launched: 21 December 1896
- Christened: Mrs. George Noble (later Lady Noble and later still Mrs Randall Wells)
- Completed: 1899
- Fate: Sold for scrap 25 October 1921

General characteristics
- Class & type: Pelorus-class protected cruiser
- Displacement: 2135 tons
- Length: 313 ft 6 in (95.6 m) (overall)
- Beam: 36 ft 6 in (11.1 m)
- Draught: 16 ft 0 in (4.9 m)
- Propulsion: 2-shaft reciprocating triple-expansion engines, Blechynden boilers, 5000hp
- Speed: 18.5 knots (34.3 km/h; 21.3 mph)
- Complement: 224
- Armament: 8 × single 4-inch (102mm)/40 QF 25-pounder; 8 × single 1.585in (57mm)/40 QF 3-pounder; 2 × single 18 inch (450 mm) torpedo tubes
- Armour: 0.25in (gun shields); 2-1.5in (decks)

HMS Pactolus was a Pelorus-class protected cruiser of the Royal Navy. There were eleven ""Third class"" protected cruisers in the class, which was designed by Sir William White. While well armed for their size, they were primarily workhorses for the overseas fleet on "police" duties and did not serve with the main battlefleet. She was scrapped in 1921.

== Design ==
They displaced 2,135 tons, had a crew complement of 224 men and were armed with eight QF 4 inch (102 mm) (25 pounder) guns, eight 3 pounder guns, three machine guns, and two 18 inch (457 mm) torpedo tubes. With reciprocating triple expansion engines and a variety of boilers, the top speed was 20 knots (37 km/h).

== Service ==
HMS Pactolus was laid down at Armstrong, Elswick in May 1896, and launched on 21 December 1896, when she was named by Mrs. George Noble, wife of George Noble (later Sir George Noble, 2nd Baronet, who was son of the chairman of Armstrong). She was not completed until 1899.

She served with the Channel Fleet, and was under the command of Captain Francis John Foley in early 1900. Captain Francis Alban Arthur Giffard Tate was appointed in command on 20 March 1900, followed by Commander Gerald Marescaux appointed in command on 20 March 1902. She took part in the fleet review held at Spithead on 16 August 1902 for the coronation of King Edward VII, and in September that year was part of a squadron visiting Nauplia and Souda Bay at Crete in the Mediterranean Sea for combined manoeuvres between the Channel and Mediterranean fleets. Later the same year she visited Tetouan with HMS Furious, and HMS Prometheus for a show of force against rebellious tribes in the areas around the town.

She was sold for scrap on 25 October 1921. HMS Pactolus and HMS Pomone had Blechynden boilers which were particularly unreliable, and they were removed from active service several years before others in the class.
