= Joel Coen =

American filmmaker (born 1954)

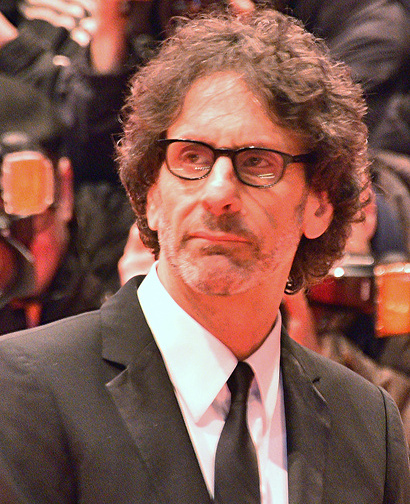
- Coen in 2016
- Born: Joel Daniel Coen; November 29, 1954 (age 71); St. Louis Park, Minnesota, U.S.
- Other name: Roderick Jaynes
- Education: Bard College at Simon's Rock (AA); New York University (BFA)
- Occupations: Film director; producer; screenwriter; editor
- Years active: 1984–present
- Spouse: Frances McDormand (m. 1984)
- Children: 1
- Relatives: Ethan Coen (brother)
- Awards: Full list

Joel Daniel Coen (born November 29, 1954) is an American filmmaker. Working alongside his brother Ethan, he has directed, written, edited and produced many feature films, the most acclaimed of which include Blood Simple (1984), Raising Arizona (1987), Miller's Crossing (1990), Barton Fink (1991), Fargo (1996), The Big Lebowski (1998), O Brother, Where Art Thou? (2000), No Country for Old Men (2007), Burn After Reading (2008), A Serious Man (2009), True Grit (2010), Inside Llewyn Davis (2013), Hail, Caesar! (2016) and The Ballad of Buster Scruggs (2018).

The duo began directing separately in the 2020s. Joel directed the 2021 thriller The Tragedy of Macbeth (adapted from the Shakespeare play) starring Denzel Washington and Coen's wife Frances McDormand. The film was his first solo directorial effort, and was nominated for three Academy Awards. Joel is set to direct another film, Jack of Spades.

The brothers, together, have won four Academy Awards from 13 nominations; one for writing Fargo, and three for writing, directing, and producing No Country For Old Men. They also won a Palme d'Or for Barton Fink.

== Early life and education ==
Joel Daniel Coen was born on November 29, 1954, in St. Louis Park, Minnesota, a suburb of Minneapolis. His brother Ethan was born almost three years later, on September 21, 1957. Their mother, Rena (née Neumann; 1925–2001), was an art historian at St. Cloud State University, and their father, Edward Coen (1919–2012), was a professor of economics at the University of Minnesota. The brothers have an older sister, Deborah, who is a psychiatrist in Israel.

Both sides of the Coen family were Eastern European Ashkenazi Jews. Their paternal grandfather, Victor Coen, was a barrister in the Inns of Court in London before retiring to Hove with their grandmother. Edward Coen was an American citizen born in the United States, but grew up in Croydon, London and studied at the London School of Economics. Afterwards he moved to the United States, where he met the Coens' mother, and served in the United States Army during World War II.

Joel graduated from St. Louis Park High School in 1973, and from Bard College at Simon's Rock in Great Barrington, Massachusetts. After Simon's Rock, Joel spent four years in the undergraduate film program at New York University, where he made a 30-minute thesis film, Soundings. In 1979, he briefly enrolled in the graduate film program at the University of Texas at Austin, following a woman he had married who was in the graduate linguistics program. The marriage soon ended in divorce and Joel left UT Austin after nine months.

== Career ==
=== With Ethan ===
After graduating from New York University, Joel worked as a production assistant on a variety of industrial films, music videos, and low-budget horror movies, including Nightmare. He developed a talent for film editing and met Sam Raimi while assisting Edna Ruth Paul in editing Raimi's first feature film, The Evil Dead (1981).

The brothers made their debut with Blood Simple (1984), a neo-noir starring John Getz, Frances McDormand, Dan Hedaya and M. Emmet Walsh. Due to DGA regulations, Joel received sole directing credit while Ethan received sole production credit. This would remain the case until 2004's The Ladykillers. It marked the first of many collaborations between the Coens and composer Carter Burwell. It was also the screen debut of Joel's wife, McDormand, who went on to feature in many of the Coens' films.

The brothers wanted to follow their debut with something fast-paced and funny. They directed Raising Arizona (1987), which starred Nicolas Cage and Holly Hunter, and marked the first of many collaborations between the Coens and John Goodman. The two continued to direct throughout the 1990s, with the black comedy thriller Barton Fink (1991) winning the Palme d'Or and being nominated for one Oscar. They directed Fargo (1996), a black comedy crime film that won many accolades, including the Academy Award for Best Actress for star Frances McDormand, as well as winning the brothers Best Original Screenplay, their first Oscar win. The Big Lebowski (1998) is a crime comedy following Jeff "The Dude" Lebowski (Jeff Bridges). It became a cult classic.

Other Oscar-nominated films the duo directed in the 2000s included O Brother, Where Art Thou? (2000) and The Man Who Wasn't There (2001). In 2007, the two made No Country for Old Men, adapted from the 2005 novel of the same name by Cormac McCarthy. The film stars Josh Brolin, Tommy Lee Jones and Javier Bardem. No Country received nearly universal critical praise, garnering a 94% "Fresh" rating at Rotten Tomatoes. It won four Academy Awards, including Best Picture, Best Director and Best Adapted Screenplay, all of which were received by the Coens, as well as Best Supporting Actor received by Bardem for his portrayal of hitman Anton Chigurh. The Coens, as "Roderick Jaynes", were also nominated for Best Editing, but did not win. It was the first time since 1961 (when Jerome Robbins and Robert Wise won for West Side Story) that two directors received the Academy Award for Best Director at the same time.

Other well-received films they directed together throughout the next decade included A Serious Man (2009), True Grit (2010), Inside Llewyn Davis (2013), Hail Caesar! (2016) and The Ballad of Buster Scruggs (2018). They also co-wrote the script for Steven Spielberg's Bridge of Spies (2015).

=== Solo work ===
By the late 2010s, Ethan was taking a break from films to focus on theater. It was announced in March 2019 that Joel, in a rare solo effort, was set to write and direct a new take on the William Shakespeare play Macbeth. The film, The Tragedy of Macbeth, starring Denzel Washington as Lord Macbeth and McDormand as Lady Macbeth, was released in 2021. The film received critical acclaim for its direction, cinematography, and the performances of Washington, McDormand, and Hunter.

In May 2025, it was announced that Coen was set to direct a new film, titled Jack of Spades. It will star Josh O'Connor and film in Scotland.

== Personal life ==
Coen has been married to actress Frances McDormand since 1984. In 1995, they adopted a son, Pedro McDormand Coen, from Paraguay when he was six months old. McDormand has acted in a number of Coen Brothers films: Blood Simple, Raising Arizona, Miller's Crossing, Barton Fink, Fargo, The Man Who Wasn't There, Burn After Reading, and Hail, Caesar!. For her performance in Fargo, she won the Academy Award for Best Actress. The two live in Marin County, California.

== See also ==
- List of Academy Award–winning siblings

== Sources ==
- King, Lynnea Chapman (2014). The Coen Brothers Encyclopedia. Lanham: Rowman & Littlefield. ISBN 9780810885769.
- Levine, Josh (2000). The Coen Brothers: The Story of Two American Filmmakers. ECW Press. ISBN 9781550224245.
