= Edward Charlton (Royal Navy officer) =

Royal Navy Admiral; Commander-in-Chief, Cape of Good Hope Station (1865–1937)

Admiral Sir Edward Charlton KCB KCMG JP
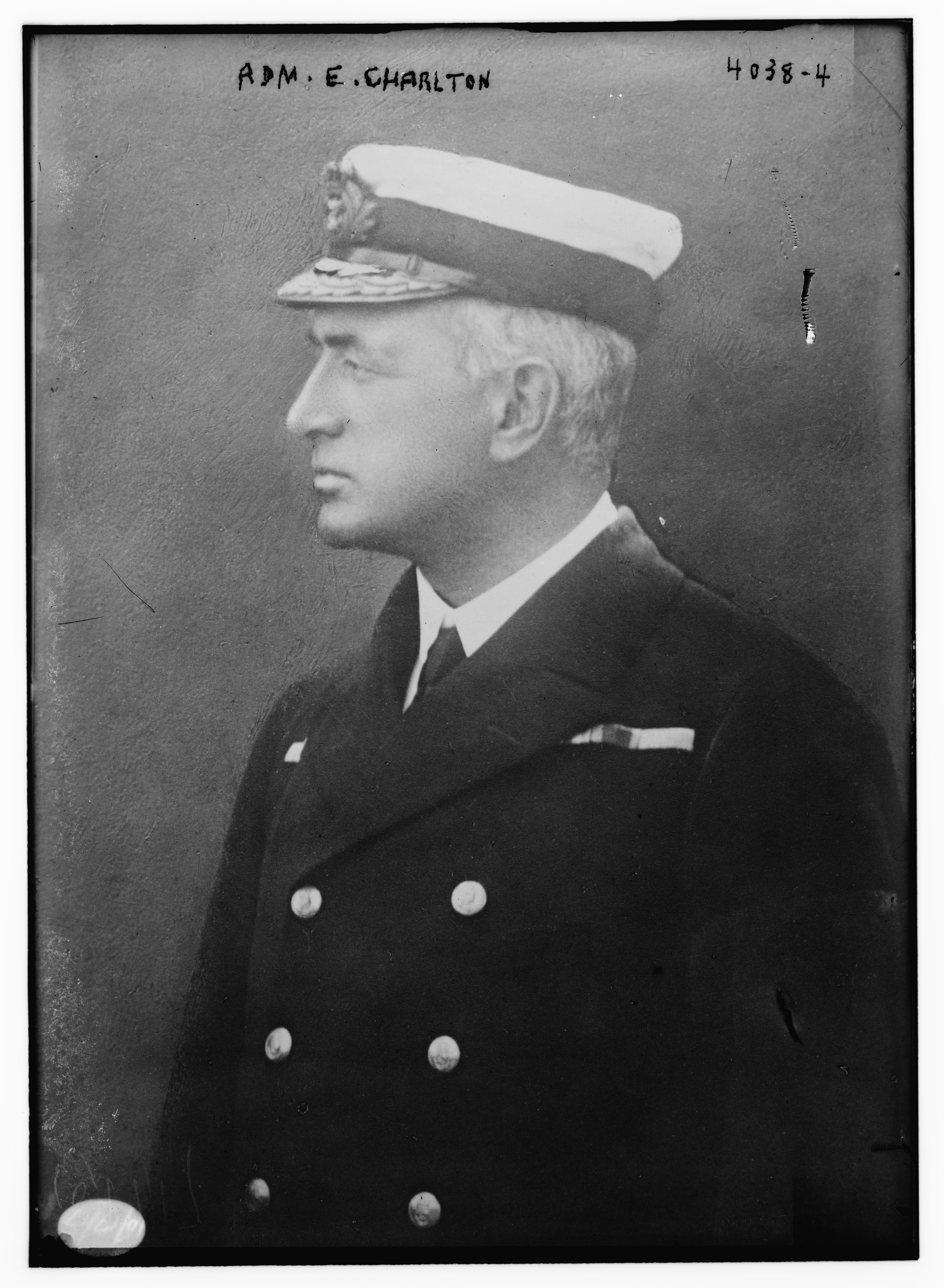
- Charlton in 1916
- Born: 21 March 1865; Newcastle-upon-Tyne
- Died: 23 October 1937 (aged 72)
- Military career
- Allegiance: United Kingdom
- Branch: Royal Navy
- Service years: 1878–1924
- Rank: Admiral
- Commands: Cape of Good Hope Station
- Conflicts: Anglo-Egyptian War; World War I
- Awards: Knight Commander of the Order of the Bath; Knight Commander of the Order of St Michael and St George

Admiral Sir Edward Francis Benedict Charlton, KCB, KCMG, JP (21 March 1865 – 23 October 1937) was a Royal Navy officer who went on to be Commander-in-Chief, Cape of Good Hope Station.

== Naval career ==
Charlton joined the Royal Navy in 1878 and served in the Anglo-Egyptian War in 1882. Promoted to the rank of captain on 1 January 1903, he was made Captain (Destroyers) in the Home Fleet in 1904. He went on to be assistant director of torpedoes from 1911. He served in World War I as Admiral Commanding East Coast Minesweepers from 1914 and then as Commander-in-Chief, Cape of Good Hope Station from 1916. After the War he became Flag Officer commanding the East Coast of England. He retired in 1924.

He lived at Eastern House in Alverstoke in Hampshire.

== Family ==
In 1903 he married Laura Mary Strutt; they had three daughters. In 1910 he married Winifred Mary Stapleton-Bretherton; they had two sons and three daughters.

Military offices
Preceded by Sir Herbert King-Hall	Commander-in-Chief, Cape of Good Hope Station; 1916–1918	Succeeded by Sir Edward Fitzherbert
