= Commander-in-Chief, Africa (Royal Navy) =

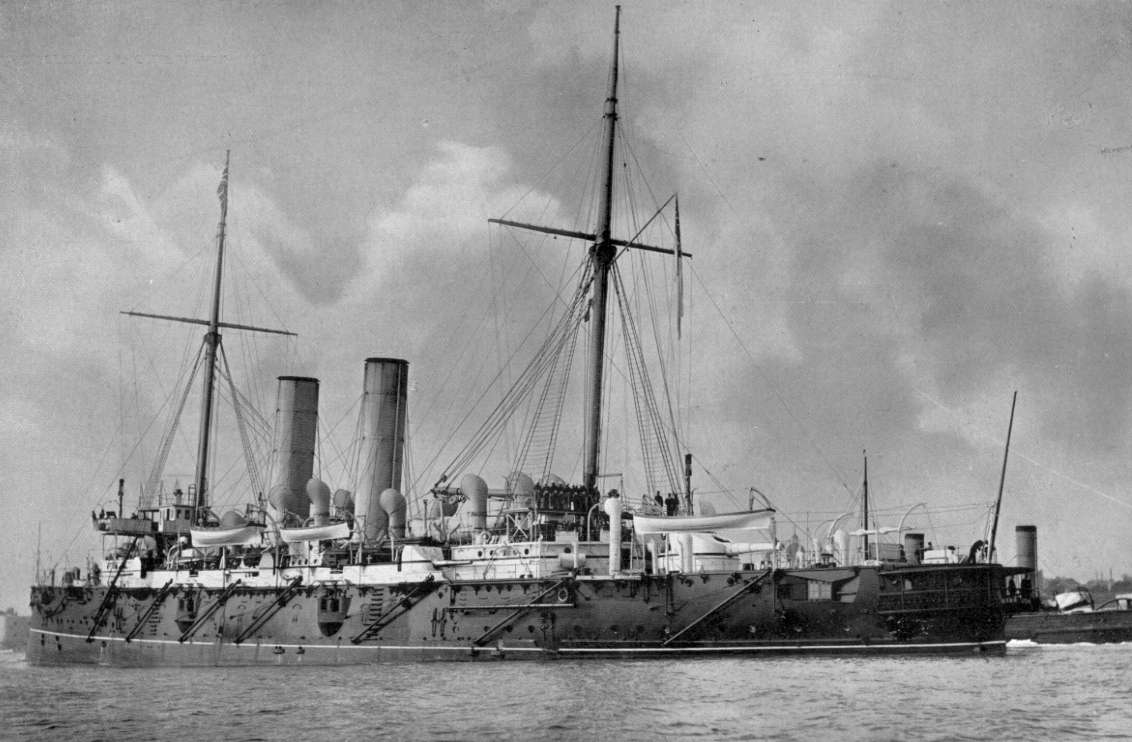
- The cruiser HMS Gibraltar, flagship of the Cape of Good Hope Station in the early 1900s
- Active: 1795–1939
- Country: United Kingdom
- Branch: Royal Navy
- Garrison/HQ: Table Bay, Simonstown, South Africa

The Commander-in-Chief, Africa was the last title of a Royal Navy's formation commander located in South Africa from 1795 to 1939. Under varying titles, it was one of the longest-lived formations of the Royal Navy. It was also often known as the Cape of Good Hope Station.

== History ==
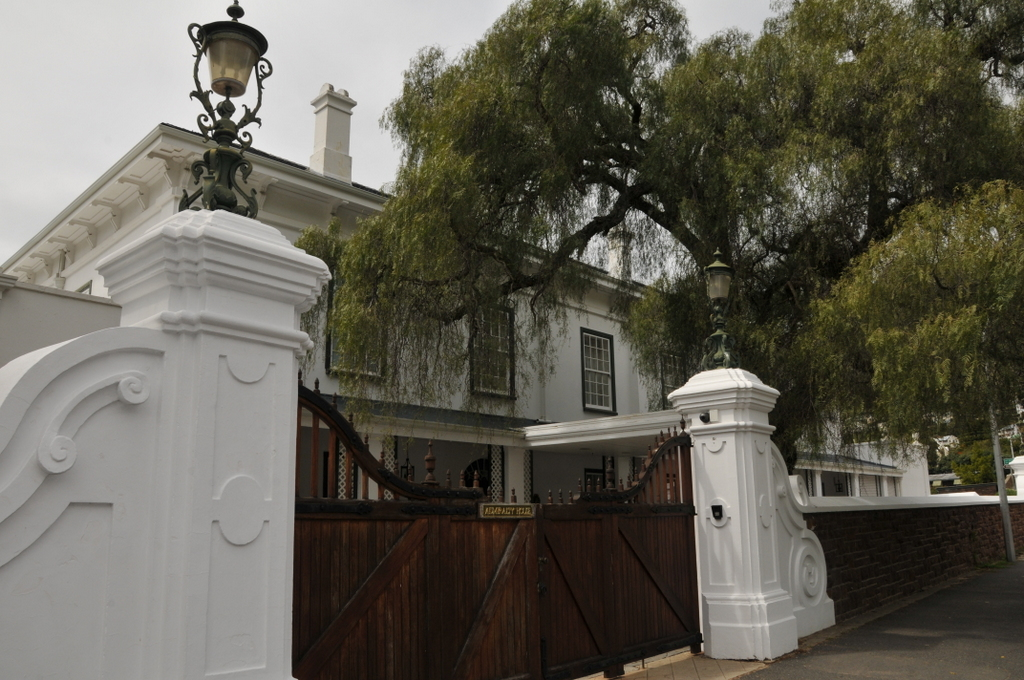
Admiralty House, Simonstown

From 1750 to 1779 the Cape of Good Hope became strategically important due to the increasing competition between France and Great Britain for control of the seas. In 1780 Holland joined the American Revolutionary War in alliance with France and Spain against Great Britain; the British Government were aware of the consequences should the Cape of Good Hope fall and the impact it would have on its trade links with India and put a plan into place to capture the Cape and circumvent its use by the enemy. The first attempt was subject to prolonged delays and the fact that the French were able to reinforce their defences enabled them to successfully defend it from the British attack. From 1781 to 1791 various attempts were made to capture the station: all failed and it remained under the control of France and the French were successful in attacking and disrupting the trade cargo of the East India Company's ships that were travelling between Asian subcontinent and Europe. In 1792 hostilities temporarily ceased and by 1793 the Directors of the East India Company expressed their concern about the cape being retained by the French. The British government and the Admiralty decided to act and successfully retook it in 1795: the first Naval base was established at Table Bay.

In 1802 the British government agreed to restore the Cape to the Dutch control but this was not finalized until 1803 and lasted until 1806, when a new British Administration under William Pitt cancelled the agreement between both countries and re-took the Cape once more in 1806, which effectively from this point on remained under British control. In 1811 the Royal Navy decided it wanted to move from its current base to a new base at Simon's Town bay; however the initial facilities took approximately three years to complete and were not ready until 1814. From 1815 to 1849 the base was mainly used for re-fitting and repair work on vessels and acted as a port of call for nautical surveyors who were mapping the region. During the 1850s and 1860s improvements were made to the dockyard facilities with some being re-built in order to accommodate larger ships. On 17 January 1865, it was combined with the East Indies Station to form the East Indies and Cape of Good Hope Station; however, the station was recreated as a separate station on 29 July 1867. From 1870, it absorbed the former West Africa station. By the start of the Second Boer War in 1899 a long period of relative peace had existed; the station became the main base for British Forces disembarking and embarking during the war and for supplies and equipment being shipped from Britain for the duration of the conflict.

=== First World War ===
In 1910 a new East Dock was built together with a dry dock facility which proved timely in the event of the breakout of the First World War. From 1914 to 1919 its primary tasks was to seek out and destroy German commerce raiders. HMS Pegasus remained as part of the Cape Station on the outbreak of the First World War. As the likelihood of war with Germany increased, the Commander-in-Chief on the Cape Station, Rear Admiral Herbert King-Hall, deployed his ships in order to counter the threat posed by the German light cruiser Königsberg, based at Dar es Salaam. On 31 July 1914, Pegasus sighted Königsberg leaving Dar es Salaam, but was unable to keep track of the faster German cruiser. King-Hall recognised that Königsberg outclassed Pegasus and intended that Pegasus should operate with the cruiser Astraea while his flagship Hyacinth operated independently to protect the trade routes around the Cape, but on 12 August, the Admiralty ordered Astraea to join Hyacinth off the Cape to escort troop convoys, leaving Pegasus unsupported at Zanzibar. On 23 August Pegasus sailed to the port of Bagamoyo in German East Africa with the intention of forcing a truce so that the port would take no further part in the war. Similar agreements had previously been made with the authorities of Dar es Salaam and Tanga. When the port authorities refused to agree to such a truce, Pegasus shelled the port's Customs House.

During the interwar period the Cape Station resumed the work of maintaining and refitting vessels stationed there and those travelling en route to Asia. In 1939, at the start of the Second World War, the base played an early prominent role in the Battle of the Atlantic, and the hunt for the German pocket battleship Admiral Graf Spee, that led to the Battle of the River Plate. After the conclusion of that engagement the station ceased as a command operations center with the senior naval staff moving to the newly formed South Atlantic station headquartered at Freetown. The naval base remained as part of that command until 1957. In 1958 the British government handed over the facility to the South African Navy.

== Commanders-in-Chief ==
The commanders-in-chief were:
No = died in post

=== Commander-in-Chief, Cape of Good Hope Station ===
- Vice-Admiral Sir George Elphinstone (1795–1796)
- Rear-Admiral Thomas Pringle (1797–1798)
- Rear-Admiral Sir Hugh Cloberry Christian (1798) No
- Vice-Admiral Sir Roger Curtis (1800–1803)

Note: from 1803 to 1806 a Dutch colony

- Commodore Sir Home Riggs Popham (1806–1807)
- Rear-Admiral Charles Stirling (1807–1808)
- Commodore Josias Rowley (1808)
- Vice-Admiral Sir Albemarle Bertie (1808–1810)
- Rear-Admiral Robert Stopford (1810–1812)
- Rear-Admiral Charles Tyler (1812–1815)
- Rear-Admiral George Cockburn (1815–1816)
- Rear-Admiral Sir Pulteney Malcolm (1816–1817)
- Rear-Admiral Robert Plampin (1817–1820)
- Rear-Admiral Robert Lambert (1820–1821)
- Commodore James Lillicrap (1821–1822)
- Commodore Joseph Nourse (1822–1824) No
- Commodore Robert Moorsom (1825)
- Commodore Hood Hanway Christian (1825–1827)
- Commodore William Skipsey (1827–1828)
- Commodore Charles Marsh Schomberg (1828–1831)
- Rear-Admiral Frederick Warren (1831–1834)
- Rear-Admiral Sir Patrick Campbell (1834–1837)
- Rear-Admiral George Elliot (1837–1840)
- Rear-Admiral Sir Edward Durnford King (1840–1841)
- Rear-Admiral Josceline Percy (1841–1846)
- Rear-Admiral James Dacres (1846–1848)
- Rear-Admiral Barrington Reynolds (1848–1849)
- Commodore Christopher Wyvill (1849–1853)
- Commodore Charles Talbot (1853–1854)
- Commodore John Adams (1854–1857)

=== Commander-in-Chief, Cape of Good Hope Station and West Africa Station ===
- Rear Admiral Sir Frederick Grey (1857–1860)
- Rear Admiral Sir Henry Keppel (1860)
- Rear Admiral Sir Baldwin Walker (1861–1865)

=== Commander-in-Chief, East Indies & Cape of Good Hope Station ===
- Commodore Frederick Montresor (1865)
- Commodore Charles Hillyar (1865–1867)

=== Commander-in-Chief, Cape of Good Hope Station and West Africa Station ===
- Commodore Sir William Dowell (1867–1871)
- Commodore Sir John Commerell (1871–1873)
- Commodore Sir William Hewett (1873–1876)
- Commodore Sir Francis Sullivan (1876–1879)
- Commodore Sir Frederick Richards (1879–1882)
- Rear Admiral Sir Nowell Salmon (1882–1885)
- Rear Admiral Sir Walter Hunt-Grubbe (1885–1888)
- Rear Admiral Sir Richard Wells (1888–1890)
- Rear Admiral Sir Henry Nicholson (1890–1892)
- Rear Admiral Sir Frederick Bedford (1892–1895)
- Rear Admiral Sir Harry Rawson (1895–1898)
- Rear Admiral Sir Robert Harris (1898–1900)
- Rear Admiral Sir Arthur Moore (1901–1903)
- Rear Admiral Sir John Durnford (1904–1907)
- Rear Admiral Sir Edmund Poë (1907–1908)
- Rear Admiral Sir George Egerton (1908–1910)
- Rear Admiral Sir Paul Bush (1910–1913)
- Vice Admiral Sir Herbert King-Hall (1913–1916)
- Vice Admiral Sir Edward Charlton (1916–1918)
- Vice Admiral Sir Edward Fitzherbert (1918–1920)

=== Commander-in-Chief, Africa Station ===
- Vice Admiral Sir William Goodenough (1920–1922)
- Vice Admiral Sir Rudolph Bentinck (1922–1924)
- Vice Admiral Sir Maurice Fitzmaurice (1924–1926) No
- Vice Admiral Sir David Anderson (1926–1929)
- Vice Admiral Sir Rudolf Burmester (1929–1931)
- Vice Admiral Sir Hugh Tweedie (1931–1933)
- Vice Admiral Sir Edward Evans (1933–1935)
- Vice Admiral Sir Francis Tottenham (1935–1938)
- Vice Admiral Sir George Lyon (31 January 1938 – 1939), who then became Commander-in-Chief, South Atlantic, 1939 to 7 September 1940.

== See also ==
- List of fleets and major commands of the Royal Navy

== Sources ==
- Corbett, Julian S. (1920). Naval Operations: Volume 1: To the Battle of the Falklands December 1914. History of the Great War. London: Longmans, Green and Co.
- Marshall, John (1827). Royal Naval Biography Supplement: Or, Memoirs of the Services of All the Flag-Officers, Superannuated Rear-Admirals, Retired-Captains, Post-Captains, and Commanders. Cambridge University Press. ISBN 978-1-108-02272-9.
- Rodger, N.A.M. The Command of the Ocean: A Naval History of Britain, 1649-1815. New York and London: W.W. Norton and Company, 2004.
- Monograph No. 10.—East Africa to July 1915 (PDF). Naval Staff Monographs (Historical). Vol. II. The Naval Staff, Training and Staff Duties Division. 1921.
