= Arthur Kemmis Betty =

Vice-Admiral Arthur Kemmis Betty DSO
- Born: 1877
- Died: 11 May 1961 (aged 83–84); Eastbourne
- Military career
- Allegiance: United Kingdom
- Branch: Royal Navy
- Rank: Vice-Admiral
- Conflicts: First World War
- Awards: Distinguished Service Order

Vice-Admiral Arthur Kemmis Betty DSO (1877 – 1961) was a senior Royal Navy officer.

== Naval career ==
Born in 1877, Arthur Kemmis Betty was educated at Bedford School and at the training ship Britannia. By then a lieutenant, he was posted to HMS Duke of Wellington on 30 April 1902, and the following month re-posted for duty with the chief of staff on board the battleship HMS Bulwark, flagship of the Mediterranean Fleet. He was promoted to the rank of Commander on 30 June 1912, and served during the First World War. In February 1915 he was appointed Flag Commander to Admiral Sir Frederick Hamilton at Rosyth and, in 1917, he was awarded the Distinguished Service Order. Between June 1917 and November 1918 he was War Staff Officer to Admiral Sir Charles Madden aboard HMS Revenge. He was promoted to the rank of captain on 30 June 1918 and assumed command of the light cruiser HMS Royalist in April 1919. He commanded the 1st Destroyer Flotilla between 1920 and 1922, and took command of the battleship HMS King George V in 1923. He was appointed as aide-de-camp to King George V in 1929.

Arthur Kemmis Betty was promoted to the rank of rear admiral in 1929 and to the rank of vice admiral in 1934. He died in Eastbourne on 11 May 1961, aged 83.
