= HMS Prometheus (1898) =

Pelorus-class cruiser of the Royal Navy

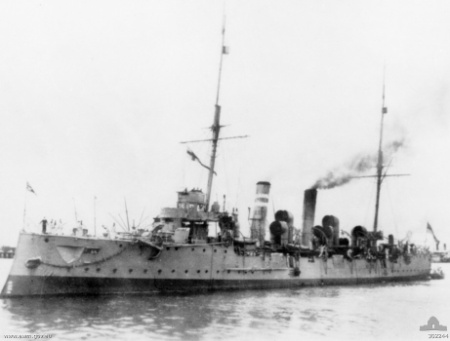
- Prometheus at Port Melbourne circa. 1913

History

United Kingdom
- Name: HMS Prometheus
- Namesake: Prometheus
- Builder: Earle's Shipbuilding, Hull
- Laid down: 1897
- Launched: 20 October 1898
- Christened: Lady Maclure
- Fate: Sold for scrap, 28 May 1914

General characteristics
- Class & type: Pelorus-class cruiser
- Displacement: 2,135 long tons (2,169 t)
- Length: 313 ft 6 in (95.55 m) o/a; 300 ft (91 m) p/p
- Beam: 36 ft 6 in (11.13 m)
- Draught: 16 ft (4.9 m)
- Propulsion: Triple expansion engine, 2 shafts, 5,000 ihp (3,728 kW)
- Speed: 20 knots (37 km/h; 23 mph)
- Complement: 224
- Armament: 8 × QF 4 in (100 mm) guns; 8 × QF 3-pounder guns; 3 × machine guns; 2 × 18-inch (450 mm) torpedo tubes
- Armour: Deck: 1 1/2–2 in (38–51 mm) deck; Gunshields: 1/4 in (6.4 mm); Conning tower: 3 in (76 mm)

HMS Prometheus was a Pelorus-class protected cruiser of the Royal Navy. Ten sister third class protected cruisers were built — designed by Sir William White. While well-armed for their size, they were primarily workhorses for the overseas fleet considered to be on police duties (not serving with the main battle fleet). She was sold for scrap in 1914.

== Construction and armament ==
The third class cruisers displaced 2,135 tons, had a crew complement of 224 men and were armed with eight QF 4 inch (102 mm) (25 pounder) guns, eight 3 pounder guns, three machine guns and two 18 inch (450 mm) torpedo tubes. With reciprocating triple expansion engines and a variety of boilers, the top speed was 20 knots (37 km/h).

HMS Prometheus was laid down at Earle's Shipbuilding Company′s yard, Hull, Yorkshire in 1897, and launched on 20 October 1898, when she was christened by Lady Maclure, wife of Sir John Maclure, 1st Baronet, deputy chairman of Earle′s Company. She was moved to Sheerness Dockyard, Kent to be fitted with arms in 1899, completed in early January 1900 and transferred to the Medway Fleet Reserve, from which she saw her first commission.

== Service history ==
Commander Frederick Hervey was appointed in command in August 1901 and commissioned the ship at Chatham 25 September 1901 to serve in the Channel Squadron. Commander Frederick Tudor was appointed in command in early 1902, when she had propeller trials at Portsmouth, and was in command when she took part in the fleet review held at Spithead on 16 August 1902 for the coronation of King Edward VII. She visited Souda Bay, Crete with other ships of the Channel squadron the following month. Later the same year she visited Tetouan with HMS Furious, and HMS Pactolus for a show of force against rebellious tribes in the areas around the town. Commander Morgan Singer was appointed in command on 3 January 1903, serving for a year.

In late 1908, while serving on the Australia Station, Prometheus was dispatched to the New Hebrides to launch a punitive expedition, following the murder of three Australians from the former Annandale Colony on Espiritu Santo. The ship shelled several beachside villages and launched a raiding party against "a group of natives who were identified as the perpetrators", shooting dead an unknown number of casualties. The expedition was the subject of controversy in Australia following reports that women and children had been among those killed.

Commander P.H. Warleigh was appointed to succeed Commander J.T.C. Glossop in command on 15 February 1910. The ship was recommissioned at Sydney on 9 December 1910.

Prometheus was sold for scrap on 28 May 1914.
