= F. F. Montrésor =

British novelist (1862–1934)

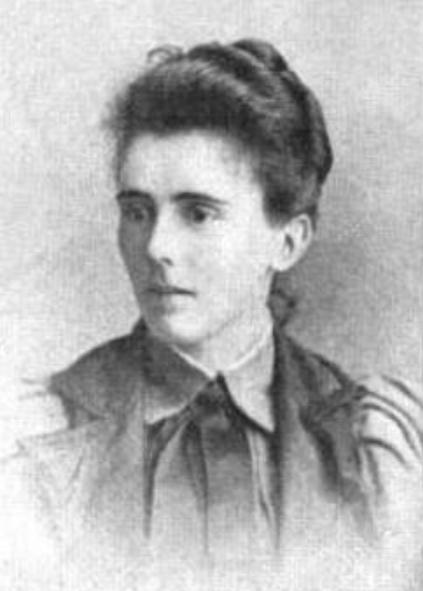
- Born: September 23, 1862; Walmer
- Died: October 17, 1934; Sheffield
- Occupation: Novelist
- Parents: Frederick Montresor (father); Emily Maria Delafield (mother)

Frances Frederica Montrésor (23 September 1862– 17 October 1934) was a British Victorian-era novelist, perhaps best known for her debut novel, Into the Highways and Hedges (1895).

F. F. Montrésor was born on 23 September 1862 in Walmer, the daughter of Admiral Frederick Byng Montresor and Emily Maria Delafield. She lived in Kensington with her mother until her mother's death in 1913 and never married. She died on 17 October 1934 in a nursing home in Sheffield.

F. F. Montrésor specialized in one-volume romance novels. Into the Highways and Hedges (1895) features Margaret Deane, a clever heiress who marries a strict evangelical street preacher, Barnabas Thorpe. In False Coin or True? (1896), Linda, an orphan, becomes a medium for Moreze, a French mesmerist. In The Alien: A Story of Middle Age (1901), a woman in her 30s, Esther Mordaunt, is the heroine of a tale of a man back from the dead and scheming over an inheritance. In The Burning Torch (1905), Dolores Ellerson is an orphan with second sight whom, like Cassandra, no one believes. Through the Chrysalis (1910) centers on Barbara, a Becky Sharp-type character. In her final novel, The Strictly Trained Mother (1913), Mrs. Betterton escapes from the abuse of her two daughters with the help of her suffragette granddaughter.

She also wrote a play about Catherine Parr, Katherine the Quene, that was staged in 1921.

== Bibliography ==
- Into the Highways and Hedges. 1 vol. London: Hutchinson, 1895.
- The One who Looked On. 1 vol. London: Hutchinson, 1895.
- Worth While. 1 vol. London: Edward Arnold, 1896.
- False Coin or True?. 1 vol. London: Hutchinson, 1896.
- At the Cross-Roads. 1 vol. London: Hutchinson, 1897.
- The Alien: A Story of Middle Age. 1 vol. London: Methuen, 1901.
- The Celestial Surgeon. 1904.
- The Burning Torch. London: J. Murray, 1905.
- A Fish out of Water. London: J. Murray, 1910.
- Through the Chrysalis. London: J. Murray, 1910.
- The Strictly Trained Mother. London: J. Murray, 1913.
