= Henry Nicholson (Royal Navy officer) =

Royal Navy Admiral (1835–1914)

Admiral Sir Henry Nicholson KCB
- Born: 21 October 1835; Upnor, Kent, England
- Died: 17 October 1914 (aged 78); Ware, Hertfordshire, England
- Military career
- Allegiance: United Kingdom
- Branch: Royal Navy
- Rank: Admiral
- Commands: HMS Temeraire; HMS Asia; Cape of Good Hope Station; Nore Command
- Awards: Knight Commander of the Order of the Bath

Admiral Sir Henry Frederick Nicholson KCB (21 October 1835 – 17 October 1914) was a Royal Navy officer who served as Commander-in-Chief, The Nore.

== Naval career ==
Nicholson joined the Royal Navy in 1849.

He was Captain of HMS Temeraire at the Bombardment of Alexandria in 1882 and went on to be Captain of HMS Asia in 1884. He became Commander-in-Chief, Cape of Good Hope and West Coast of Africa Station in 1890 and Commander-in-Chief, The Nore in 1896. He retired in 1897.

He died in 1914.

== Family ==
Nicholson married, in 1874, Frances Anne Thomson, daughter of George Thomson, QC, of New Brunswick. Lady Nicholson was godmother to HMS Proserpine on her launch at Sheerness Dockyard on 5 December 1896.

Military offices
Preceded by Sir Richard Wells	Commander-in-Chief, Cape of Good Hope Station; 1890–1892	Succeeded by Sir Frederick Bedford
Preceded by Sir Richard Wells	Commander-in-Chief, The Nore; 1896–1897	Succeeded by Sir Charles Hotham
