= Richard Wells (Royal Navy officer) =

Royal Navy Admiral (1833–1896)

Admiral Sir Richard Wells KCB
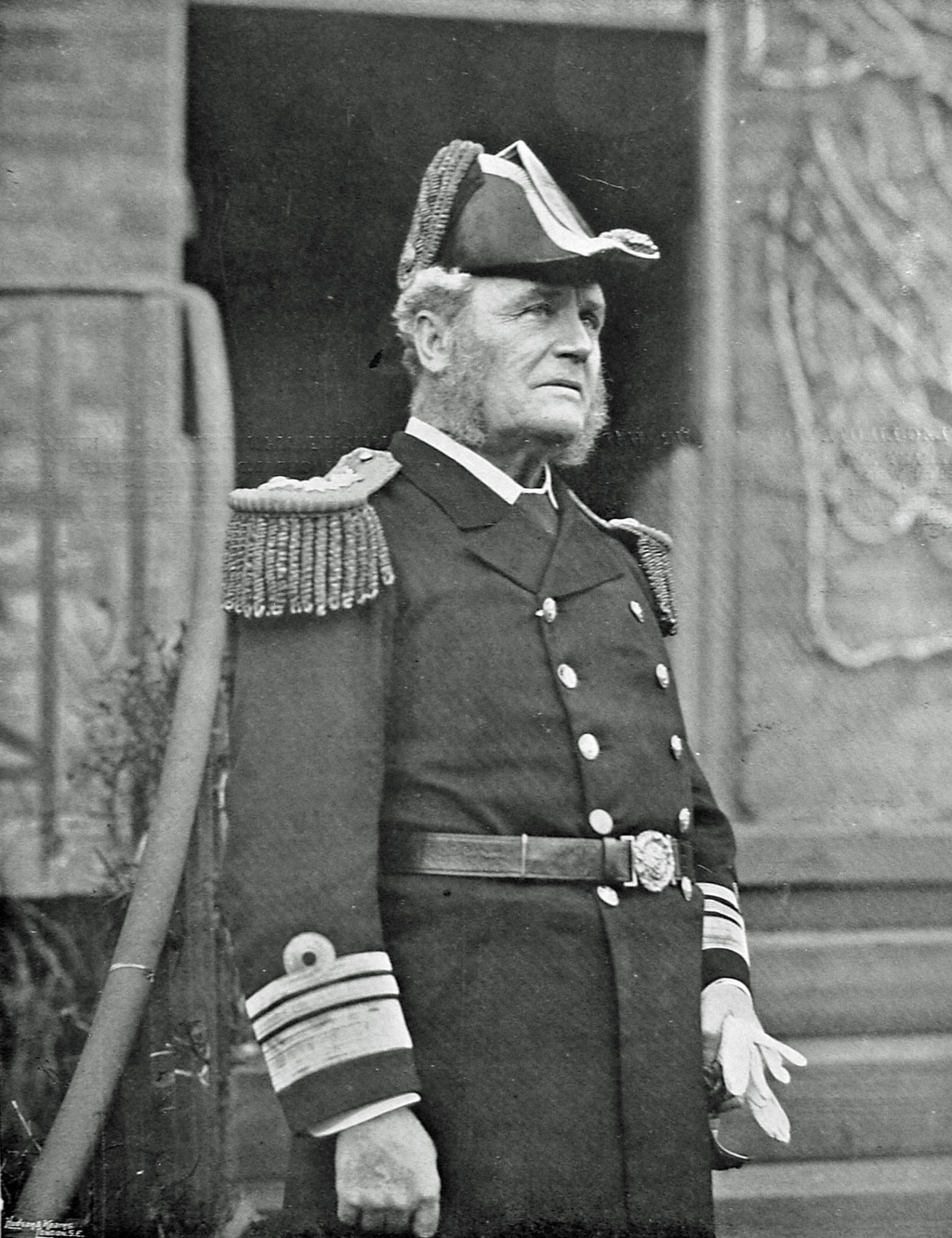
- Born: 3 February 1833
- Died: 9 October 1896 (aged 63)
- Military career
- Allegiance: United Kingdom
- Branch: Royal Navy
- Rank: Admiral
- Commands: HMS Revenge; HMS Royal Alfred; HMS Bellerophon; HMS Agincourt; HMS Britannia; Cape of Good Hope and West Coast of Africa Station; Nore Command
- Conflicts: Crimean War
- Awards: Knight Commander of the Order of the Bath

Admiral Sir Richard Wells KCB (3 February 1833 – 9 October 1896) was a Royal Navy officer who went on to be Commander-in-Chief, The Nore.

== Naval career ==
Wells joined the Royal Navy in 1847 and served in the Crimean War in 1855. He was on board HMS Bombay when she was accidentally burned in 1864 with the loss of 91 lives off Montevideo. Promoted to captain in 1866, he commanded HMS Revenge, HMS Royal Alfred, HMS Bellerophon and then HMS Agincourt. He became Captain of the training ship HMS Britannia in 1880 before being appointed Commander-in-Chief, Cape of Good Hope and West Coast of Africa Station in 1888 and Commander-in-Chief, The Nore in 1894.

Military offices
| Preceded by Sir Walter Hunt-Grubbe | Commander-in-Chief, Cape of Good Hope Station; 1888–1890 | Succeeded by Sir Henry Nicholson |
| Preceded by Sir Algernon Heneage | Commander-in-Chief, The Nore; 1894–1896 | Succeeded by Sir Henry Nicholson |
