= Henri Marescaux =

French army general and deacon (1943–2021)

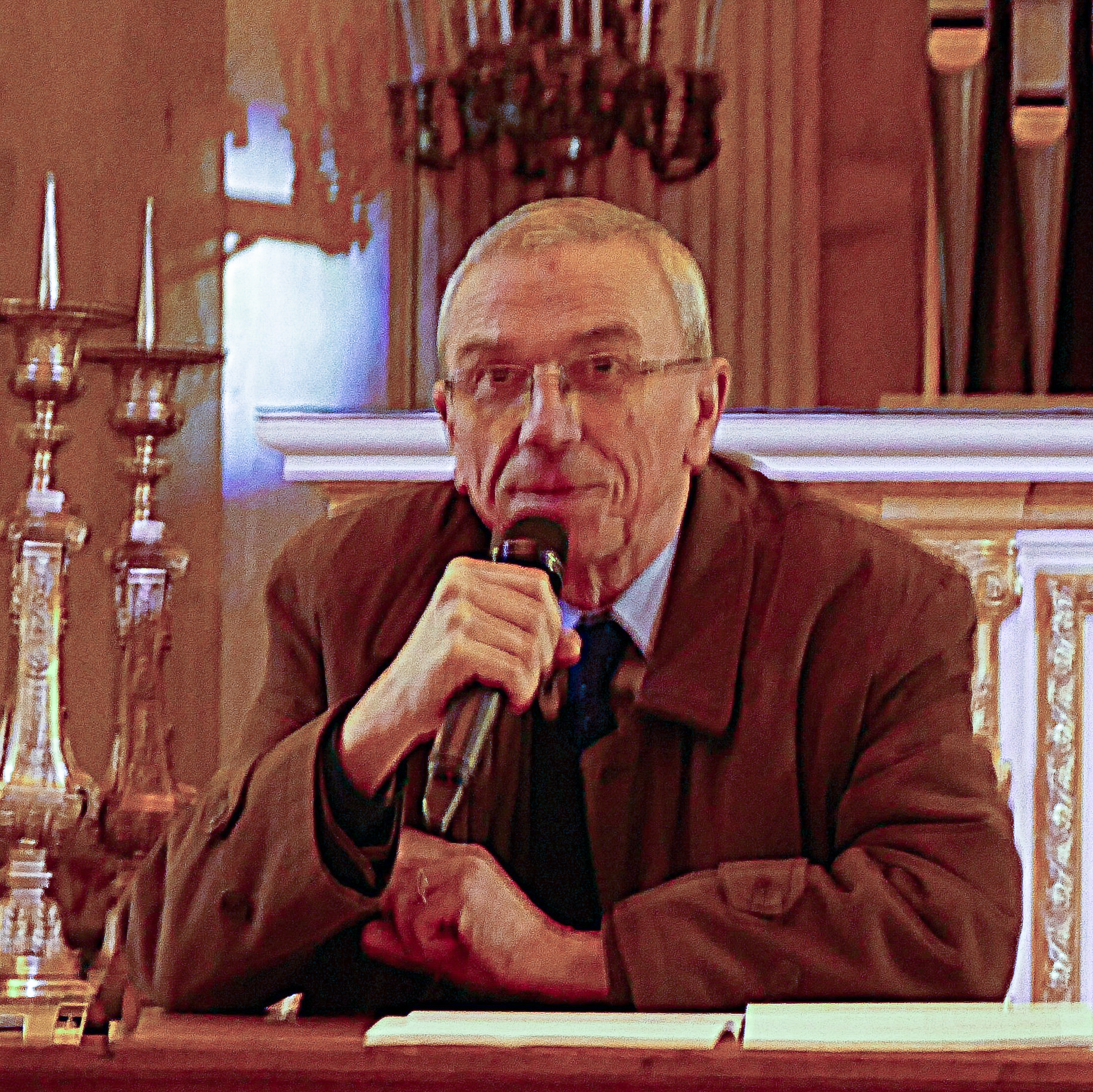
- Marescaux in 2019
- Born: 12 September 1943; Albertville, France
- Died: 1 April 2021 (aged 77); Le Chesnay-Rocquencourt, France
- Occupations: Army General; Deacon

Henri Marescaux (12 September 1943 – 1 April 2021) was a French army general and Roman Catholic deacon.

== Biography ==
Marescaux studied at the École Polytechnique from 1963 to 1965 and joined the French Army in 1965, achieving the rank of second lieutenant in 1965, lieutenant in 1966, captain 1970, battalion commander in 1977, lieutenant-colonel in 1981, colonel in 1985, brigadier general in 1992, division general in 1995, army corps general in 1998, and army general in 2001.

During his military career, Marescaux continued his studies at the École des ponts ParisTech, the École d'état-major, and the École de guerre. As a lieutenant, he was assigned to teach at the École du génie. He then directed the 19th Engineer Regiment Besançon. From 1993 to 1997, he was Director General of the École Polytechnique. After spending time with the Direction générale de l'armement, he became an Army General in 1999. He retired from the Army in 2002 as an inspecteur général des armées.

In 2004, Marescaux was ordained a deacon with the Diocese of Versailles by Bishop Éric Aumonier, devoting himself to the service of prostitutes. After his experience with the Mouvement du Nid, he founded the Association Tamaris for the prostitutes' aide. He assisted in getting several hundred of them out of sex work, offering French classes to foreigners and tutoring them in their courses. In 2019, he published a book on his experiences, titled Les prostituées nous précèdent.

Henri Marescaux died in Le Chesnay on 1 April 2021 at the age of 77.
