= Walter Hunt-Grubbe =

Royal Navy Admiral (1833–1922)

Admiral Sir Walter Hunt-Grubbe GCB
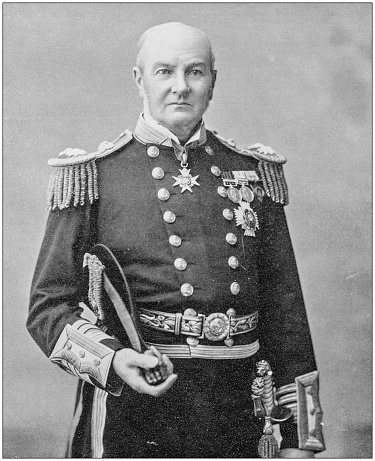
- Born: 23 February 1833
- Died: 11 April 1922 (aged 89)
- Military career
- Allegiance: United Kingdom
- Branch: Royal Navy
- Rank: Admiral
- Commands: HMS Tamar; HMS Rupert; HMS Devastation; HMS Pembroke; HMS Sultan; Cape of Good Hope Station; Royal Naval College, Greenwich
- Conflicts: Anglo-Ashanti wars
- Awards: Knight Grand Cross of the Order of the Bath

Admiral Sir Walter James Hunt-Grubbe GCB (23 February 1833 – 11 April 1922) was a Royal Navy officer who went on to be Commander-in-Chief, Cape of Good Hope Station.

== Naval career ==
Hunt-Grubbe joined the Royal Navy in 1845. Promoted to captain in 1866, he was given command of HMS Tamar and the men of the naval brigade at the Battle of Amoaful during the Anglo-Ashanti wars. He went on to command HMS Rupert, HMS Devastation and then HMS Pembroke in which capacity he was in charge of the Medway Steam Reserve. Later he commanded HMS Sultan. He was appointed Commander-in-Chief, Cape of Good Hope and West Coast of Africa Station in 1885 and Superintendent of Devonport dockyard in 1888. He went on to be President of the Royal Naval College, Greenwich, in 1894.

In retirement he became deputy chairman of the committee established in 1898 to provide for the efficient organisation and management of the London School of Hygiene & Tropical Medicine. He was appointed Knight Grand Cross of the Order of the Bath in the 1899 Birthday Honours.

== Family ==
In 1867 he married Mary Anne Codrington.

Military offices
Preceded by Sir Nowell Salmon	Commander-in-Chief, Cape of Good Hope Station; 1885–1888	Succeeded by Sir Richard Wells
Preceded by Sir Richard Hamilton	President, Royal Naval College, Greenwich; 1894–1897	Succeeded by Sir Richard Tracey
