= Kathleen Marescaux =

Irish artist (1868–1944)

- Born: Kathleen Dennis; 14 April 1868; Kilkenny, United Kingdom of Great Britain and Ireland
- Died: 14 April 1944 (aged 75); Kilkenny, Ireland
- Spouse: Gerald Marescaux

Kathleen Marescaux (3 July 1868 – 14 April 1944), born Kathleen Louisa Rose Dennis, was an Irish artist, best known as a painter of botanical subjects and rural landscapes.

== Early life ==
Kathleen Louisa Rose Dennis was born in Kilkenny, the daughter of James Benjamin Dennis and Emma Salmon Dennis. Her father was a military officer, and her mother was born in India, into an English military family.

== Art ==
Marescaux was best known for painting botanical subjects and rural landscapes. She first exhibited at the Royal Hibernian Academy in 1893, and continued there until 1935. Her works were also seen at the Towner Gallery in Eastbourne, and in shows with the Dublin Sketching Club, the WCSI, the Fine Art Society (London) and the Ulster Academy of Arts.

== Personal life ==
Kathleen Dennis married London-born Royal Navy officer (later Vice-Admiral) Gerald Charles Adolphe Marescaux at St. Canice's Cathedral, Kilkenny, Ireland, in 1894. She had two sons, Geoffrey (1901-1986) and Laurence (born 1903). Kathleen Marescaux was widowed in 1920, and she died in 1944, in Kilkenny, aged 75 years. There is a collection of her papers, and another of her family's papers, in the National Library of Ireland.

In 2009, to mark the 400th anniversary of Kilkenny as a city, the Butler Gallery held "Kilkenny: An Artists Celebration", an exhibition featuring Kilkenny artists, including Kathleen Marescaux.

== Bonnettstown House ==
Marescaux is associated with Bonnettstown House in Kilkenny, through her son, Commander Geoffrey Marescaux de Saubruit, and through her sister, Ethel Mary Dennis Knox. A book about Bonnettstown House was published in 1989 by American photographer Andrew Bush and author Mark Haworth-Booth. The house was sold most recently in 2017.
