= HMS Gladiator (1844) =

Royal Navy paddle frigate

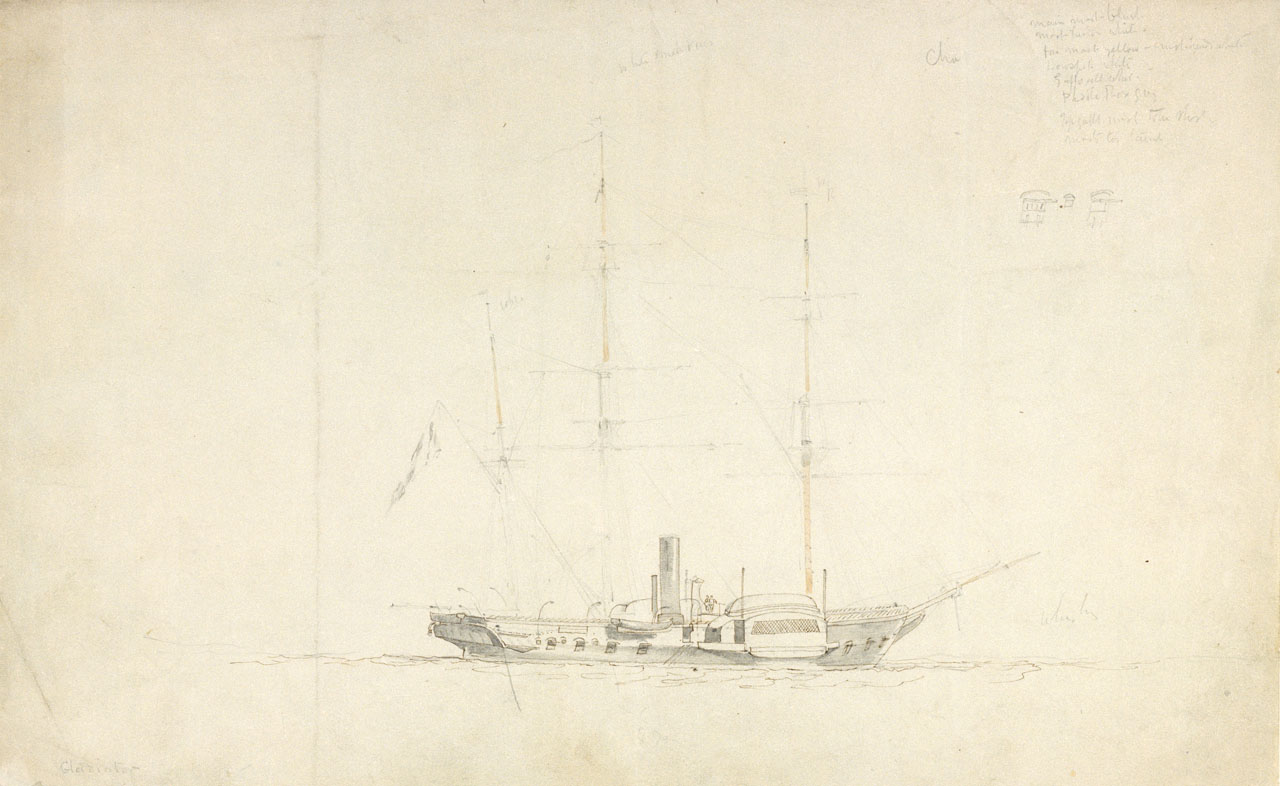
- Drawing of HMS Gladiator

History

United Kingdom
- Name: Gladiator
- Launched: 15 October 1844
- Fate: Scrapped, 1879

General characteristics
- Type: Paddle frigate
- Displacement: 1,960 long tons (1,990 t)
- Propulsion: Paddle wheels
- Armament: 6 guns

HMS Gladiator was a wooden paddle frigate of the Royal Navy. She was launched in 1844, and scrapped in 1879.

== Service history ==
Gladiator was launched on 15 October 1844 in Woolwich. She was stationed in the Black Sea during the Crimean War, but saw no action. In 1864, whilst in Devonport, Gladiator was reassigned to 'irregular or particular service'. She was decommissioned and broken up for scrap in 1879. Her figurehead was preserved in Devonport.
