= HMS Acheron =

Eight vessels of the Royal Navy have been named HMS Acheron after Acheron, a river of Hades in Greek mythology.

- HMS Acheron (1803) was an 8-gun bomb vessel purchased in 1803 and captured and burnt by the French frigates Incorruptible and Hortense near Gibraltar on 4 February 1805.
- HMS Acheron (1838) was a wood paddle sloop launched in 1838 and sold in 1855.
- HMS Acheron was to have been a screw sloop. She was laid down in 1861 but she was cancelled in 1863 before her launch.
- HMS Northumberland was an ironclad frigate launched in 1866. She became a base ship in 1898 and was renamed HMS Acheron in 1904. She was hulked as C8 in 1908, renamed C68 in 1926, was sold in 1927, and resold as the hulk Stedmound.
- HMS Acheron (1879) was a torpedo boat launched in 1879 and sold in 1902.
- HMS Acheron (1911) was an Acheron-class destroyer launched in 1911 and sold in 1921.
- HMS Acheron (H45) was an A-class destroyer launched in 1930 and sunk by a mine off the Isle of Wight in 1940.
- HMS Acheron (P411) was an Amphion-class diesel-electric submarine launched in 1947 and scrapped in 1972.
