= Hannah (1793 ship) =

History

Great Britain
- Name: Hannah
- Owner: Robt. Hodgson
- Builder: H. and T. Barrick, Whitby
- Launched: 1793
- Captured: 1805

General characteristics
- Tons burthen: 140, or 147 (bm)
- Armament: 4 × 4-pounder guns

Hannah was launched at Whitby in 1793. Her owner in 1796 transferred her registry from Whitby to London. She traded with the Baltic, between London and Liverpool, and then the Baltic again. A Spanish privateer captured her in 1805.

== Career ==
Hannah entered Lloyd's Register (LR) in 1793 with James, master, R.Hodgson, owner, and trade Dantzig–Lynn. During her only voyage to the Mediterranean a Spanish privateer captured her.

Hannah was part of a convoy of some 30 merchant vessels that had left Malta on 2 January 1805 under the escort of HMS Acheron and Arrow. Bad weather off the coast of Spain between 19 and 22 January split the convoy into two parts, each part under the escort of one of the two Royal Navy vessels. On 3 February the French frigates Hortense and Incorruptible intercepted the convoy, which had reformed. Although they were outgunned, Acheron and Arrow engaged the French frigates, which sank Arrow and captured Acheron. After the loss of their escorts, some of the surviving merchant vessels of the convoy fell prey to privateers. Fuerte, of Cadiz, captured Alert, Langley, master, Castle, Anderson, master, a ship, and a brig, and sent them into Malaga. Reportedly, Fuerte had captured a fifth vessel that she sent into Algeciras.

Hannah left the convoy and sailed back towards Malta. About a month later she was coming from Sicily when the Spanish privateer Fuerte captured her. Fuerte, of Cadiz, brought Hannah and Chesterfield into Malaga on 6 March.

Year	Master	Owner	Trade	Source & notes
1795	J.Smith	R.Hodgson	Petersburg–Cork	LR
1796	J.Smith	R.Hodgson	Liverpool–London	LR
1798	J.Smith	R.Hodgson	Liverpool–London	LR
1799–1800				Not listed in LR
1801	J. Horen	Capt. & Co.	London–Baltic	LR
1805	J.Horn	J.Horn	Liverpool–Malta	LR; damages repaired in 1803
1806	J.Horn	J.Horn	Dublin–Liverpool	LR
