= Arthur Farquhar (Royal Navy officer, born 1772) =

Royal Navy rear-admiral; (1772–1843)

Rear-Admiral Sir Arthur Farquhar KCH CB
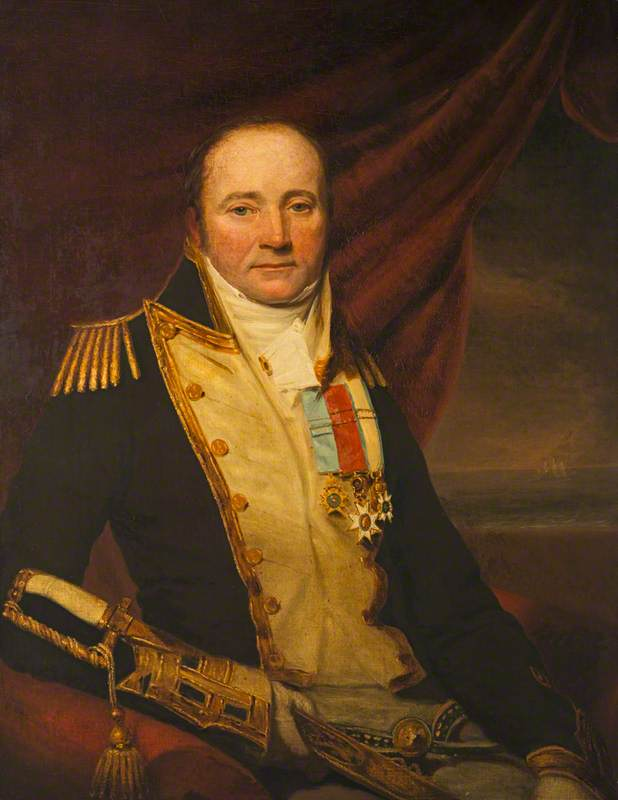
- Farquhar c.1837
- Born: 1772; Newhall, Scotland
- Died: 2 October 1843; Aboyne, Scotland
- Spouse: Jane Murray (m. 1809)
- Children: Sir Arthur Farquhar
- Parents: Robert Farquhar (father); Agnes Morison (mother)
- Relatives: William Farquhar (brother)
- Military career
- Allegiance: United Kingdom of Great Britain and Ireland
- Branch: Royal Navy
- Service years: 1787-1843
- Rank: Rear-Admiral
- Commands: HMS Acheron; HMS Ariadne; HMS Desiree; HMS Liverpool; HMS Blanche
- Conflicts: French Revolutionary Wars; Napoleonic Wars
- Awards: Knight Commander of the Royal Guelphic Order; Companion of the Bath; Knight of the Sword

Sir Arthur Farquhar, KCH, CB (1772 – 2 October 1843) was an officer of the British Royal Navy. He served during the French Revolutionary and Napoleonic Wars.

== History ==
Farquhar was second youngest son of Robert Farquhar of Newhall near Aberdeen. His younger brother William was a founder of modern Singapore. He entered the navy in 1787 on board HMS Lowestoffe, and, after serving in several other ships, mostly on the home station, and having passed his examination, entered on board an East India Company's ship. He had scarcely, however, arrived in India when news of the outbreak of the French Revolutionary Wars led him to enter on board the sloop HMS Hobart, whence he was removed to the flagship, and in April 1798 was promoted to be lieutenant. On his return to England as first lieutenant of HMS Heroine, he was employed in various ships on the home, Mediterranean, Baltic, and North Sea stations, until promoted to be commander on 29 April 1802.

In January 1804 he was appointed to the bomb vessel HMS Acheron, and on 4 February 1805 being, in company with the sloop HMS Arrow, in charge of convoy, was captured by two large French frigates, Incorruptible and Hortense, after a defence that was rightly pronounced by the court-martial (28 March 1805) to be 'highly meritorious and deserving imitation'. Farquhar was most honourably acquitted, and the president of the court, Sir Richard Bickerton, as he returned his sword, expressed a hope that he might soon be called on to serve in a ship in which he might meet his captor on more equal terms: 'the result of the contest,’ he added, 'may be more lucrative to you, but it cannot be more honourable.' A few days later, 8 April, Farquhar was advanced to post-rank; he afterwards was presented with a sword, value 100l., by the Patriotic Fund, and by the merchants of Malta with a piece of plate and complimentary letter, 19 September 1808. From 1806 to 1809 he commanded the 20-gun HMS Ariadne in the Baltic and North Sea, during which time he captured several privateers, French and Danish. From 1809 to 1814 he commanded the frigate HMS Desiree in the North Sea, captured many privateers, gunboats, and armed vessels, and was senior naval officer in the operations in the Weser, the Ems, and the Elbe in 1813, culminating in the capture of Glückstadt on 5 January 1814. For these important services Farquhar was made a knight of the Sword of Sweden, and also of the Royal Guelphic Order. In 1815 he was made a Companion of the Bath, and in September 1817 received the freedom of Aberdeen. From May 1814 to April 1816 he commanded the 40-gun HMS Liverpool at the Cape of Good Hope, and from 1830 to 1833 HMS Blanche in the West Indies, with a broad pennant, and for his services there during the Baptist War, received a vote of thanks from the House of Assembly of Jamaica, a sword valued at 150l., and a piece of plate from the merchants.

On his return home he was knighted, and was made a Knight Commander of the Royal Guelphic Order in 1832. He became a rear-admiral in 1837, and died at his residence in Aberdeenshire on 2 October 1843.
