= Thomas Brodie (Royal Navy officer) =

Officer in the Royal Navy during the French Revolutionary and Napoleonic Wars

Thomas Charles Brodie
- Born: 1779
- Died: 14 March 1811 (aged 31–32) Jamaica
- Allegiance: Kingdom of Great Britain; United Kingdom
- Branch: Royal Navy
- Service years: 1791 – 1811
- Rank: Captain
- Conflicts: French Revolutionary Wars; Battle of the Nile; Siege of Acre; Battle of Copenhagen

Thomas Charles Brodie (1779 – 14 March 1811) was an officer in the Royal Navy during the French Revolutionary and Napoleonic Wars. As a lieutenant, he fought at the Battle of the Nile in 1798 and the Siege of Acre in 1799. Promoted to the rank of commander on 14 February 1801, Brodie is one of two people credited with the command of HMS Arrow at the Battle of Copenhagen in April.

Promoted to captain in 1802, Brodie spent some time in charge of a group of Sea Fencibles in south-west Ireland. He commissioned the 38-gun HMS Hyperion in 1808 and served in her in the Mediterranean and West Indies. Brodie died in Jamaica from an unknown illness on 14 March 1811.

== Early life and career ==
Thomas Charles Brodie was born in 1779. He was the son of William Brodie, a magistrate at the Great Marlborough Street law courts, and the grandson of David Brodie, a Royal Navy officer who fought at the Battle of Porto Bello in 1739 and the Battle of Cartagena in 1741.

Brodie entered the Royal Naval Academy at Portsmouth in 1791, became a midshipman in 1794 and on 17 February 1798, passed his examination for lieutenant. He served in this capacity, aboard HMS Theseus, at the Battle of the Nile. At the Siege of Acre, Brodie was in charge of one of the small gunboats that swept the French trenches with flanking fire, helping to repel repeated French assaults on the city. Brodie was promoted to the rank of commander on 14 February 1801.

== Command ==
Naval historian Peter Hore claims that, on receiving his promotion, Brodie was given command of HMS Arrow and took her into the Battle of Copenhagen in April. Many earlier sources, including William Laird Clowes and William James, disagree, recording William Bolton as her captain during this period but Hore insists that this is incorrect and the original source of this "mistake", Steel's Original and Correct Navy List (1801), was out of date at the time. (Note: Some contemporary sources back up Hore's claim: An 1806 commemorative paper released by the London Gazette and obituaries from 1811, published in The Gentleman's Magazine and The European Magazine, all put Brodie in command of Arrow at Copenhagen.) According to Hore, Arrow's log and muster book, held at the National Archives at Kew, bear Brodie's signature from 25 February 1801 and other documents indicate that Bolton was on half pay in England throughout April. (Note: The National Maritime Museum's Warship Histories also suggests that Brodie was her commander at the time.)

At the battle, Arrow was in a squadron of sloops and frigates, under the command of Edward Riou, that attacked the Danish vessels near the harbour mouth. (Note: The other vessels in the squadron were Riou's HMS Amazon, Arrow's sister ship, Dart, the 36-gun HMS Blanche, 32-gun HMS Alcmene, the 14-gun Otter, the 10-gun Zephyr) She was the last to get into position and had to run the entire length of Nelson's line, firing between the ships as she went. Unlike Nelson, Riou obeyed Hyde Parker's famous signal, and had his squadron withdraw. Most of his force had been badly mauled by the shore batteries, having been exposed to fire for up to 2 hours but Arrow escaped serious damage, having only just arrived to drop anchor and let off a single salvo.

Brodie was made captain in 1802. He spent some time in command of the Sea Fencibles, that operated between Sheep's Head and Dursey Island in County Cork, before commissioning the newly built HMS Hyperion in 1808 for service in the Mediterranean and West Indies. Later that year, on 3 October, she captured Dix Sept Decembre. On 17 January 1810, Hyperion in company with Horatio and the gun-brig Fervent, recaptured the merchant ship, Tom.

== Capture and death ==
Brodie was captured and held prisoner while visiting Haiti in 1811. The ship was being resupplied at Gonaives when an English merchant asked for Brodie's protection. Shortly after, the shore batteries unexpectedly fired upon Hyperion's boats. Three people were killed and Brodie and two other officers were taken prisoner. They were released the following day after the first lieutenant had Hyperion beat up a narrow channel and present its broadside to the town.

A few weeks later, Brodie was in Jamaica where, on 14 March, he died from a mystery illness. It was proposed that he had contracted the disease while in captivity on Haiti.
