= HMS Despatch (1804) =

Brig-sloop of the Royal Navy

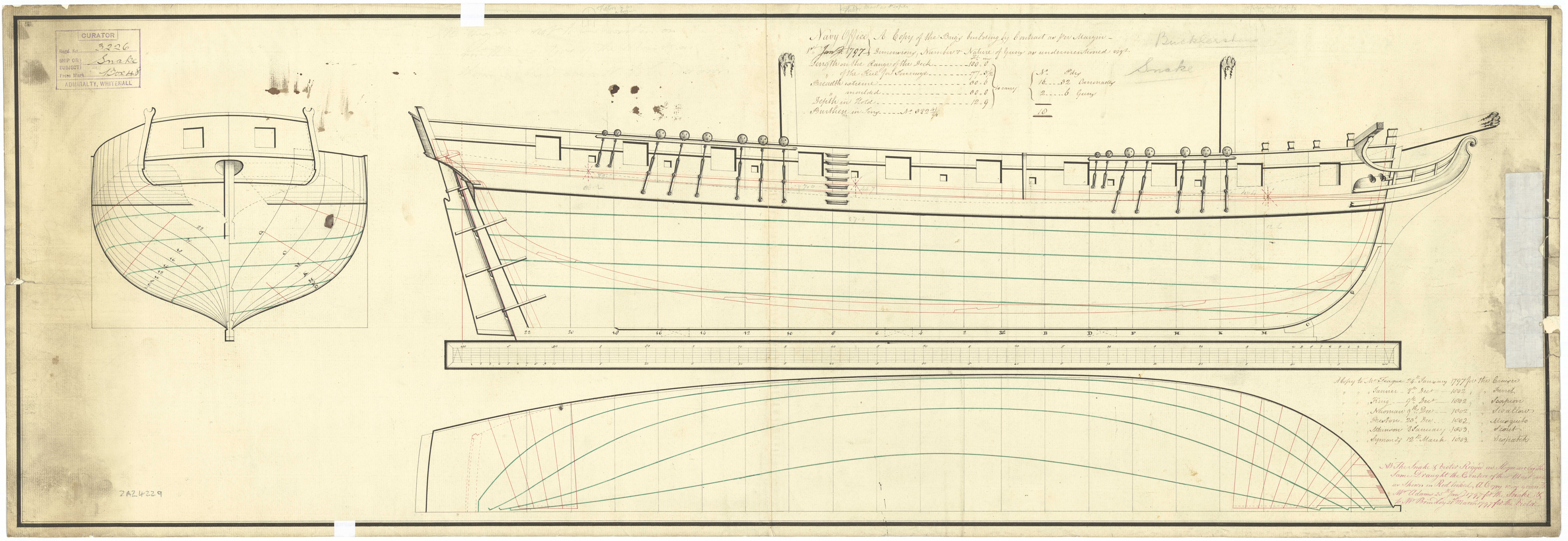
- Despatch

History

United Kingdom
- Name: HMS Despatch or Dispatch
- Ordered: 27 November 1802
- Builder: Richard Symons & Co., Falmouth
- Laid down: April 1803
- Launched: 26 May 1804
- Fate: Broken up September 1811

General characteristics
- Type: Cruizer class brig-sloop
- Tons burthen: 382 42/94 (bm)
- Length: 100 ft 0 in (30.5 m) (gundeck); 77 ft 3 1/2 in (23.6 m) (keel)
- Beam: 30 ft 6 in (9.3 m)
- Depth of hold: 12 ft 9 in (3.9 m)
- Sail plan: Brig rigged
- Complement: 121
- Armament: 16 × 32-pounder carronades + 2 × 6-pounder bow guns

HMS Dispatch (also Despatch) was a Royal Navy Cruizer-class brig-sloop built by Richard Symons & Co. at Falmouth and launched in 1804. Dispatch was instrumental in the capture of a 40-gun French frigate and was active at the Battle of Copenhagen in 1807. She also sailed on the Jamaica station. She was broken up relatively early, in 1811.

== Initial service ==
She was commissioned in May 1804 under Commander Edward Hawkins for the Channel and cruising. She then joined a squadron under Captain Thomas Dundas in Naiad.

On 25 October, Hawkins sighted two strange vessels some five or six leagues off Pointe du Raz. Dispatch captured both, which proved to be the French gun-vessels No. 345 and No. 353. Each was armed with two brass guns, one a 32-pounder and the other a 6-pounder. Each had a crew of 20 soldiers. They had left Brest for Odierne (or Dandiorne) but the wind had blown them out to sea. Conquest arrived on the scene and then the British sighted two more gun-vessels. Dispatch captured one, No. 371, armed like the two already captured, but with a crew of 22. Hawkins thought it too dangerous to try to send the three gun-vessels to England so he sank them after having removed the guns.

At daylight 27 November 1804 while Naiad was off Brest, she saw some small vessels open musket fire on boats belonging to Aigle that were chasing them. (Aigle had two seamen wounded, one dangerously.) Naiad gave chase and captured French gun-vessels Nos. 361 and 369. They each mounted one long brass 4 pounder gun and one short 12-pounder and had on board a lieutenant from the 63rd infantry regiment, 36 privates and six seamen. They had sailed with fourteen others from Dandiorne to Brest. Captain Thomas Dundas of Naiad ordered Hawkins and Dispatch to take the gunboats and prisoners in to Plymouth.

On 28 April 1805 Dispatch capture the Spanish vessel of war, Nostra Senora del Anparo, alias Espadarte. Late in the year Dispatch captured a number of merchantmen: Desir de la Paix (30 September), Genevieve (7 October), Louise (15 October), and Spadron (31 October).

== French frigate Président ==
On 27 September 1806 Dispatch was part of a squadron under Rear-Admiral Sir Thomas Louis that included Canopus and Blanche. The squadron captured the French 40-gun French frigate Président, with Dispatch playing a critical role.

Louis's squadron had sailed to the Bay of Biscay to await the return of Admiral Willaumez from the Caribbean. On spotting the Président, the squadron gave chase but the ships of the line were not fast enough to catch her. However, Dispatch was able to get within firing range. Dispatch proceeded to harry Président with her forward guns, forcing Président to turn towards Blanche. Seeing Président turn, Louis ordered Canopus to fire, even though the range was extreme. Realizing that the rest of the British squadron would arrive shortly, Président struck, surrendering to Dispatch. Président had suffered only minor damage and neither side suffered any casualties. The Royal Navy took her into service as HMS President. Hawkins had been made post-captain two days prior to the action.

A few weeks after this action, Dispatch captured two French merchantmen. One of the ships carried sardines and was of so little value that Dispatch promptly scuttled her. The larger ship carried brandy, coffee and some guns, so he sent her back to England with a prize crew.

Between 10 and 12 February 1807 Hawkins faced a court martial on board Gladiator at Portsmouth. The charges, which had "aroused an unusual degree of interest", stemmed from when he had commanded Dispatch. Thomas Thompson, who had been master of Despatch, had written an initially anonymous letter charging Hawkins with having willfully murdered a seaman, William Davie. Davie had been ill and Thompson charged that Hawkins's negligence and inattention between 9 and 25 December 1805 had brought about Davie's death. Hawkins advanced evidence that Davie was a skulker and under a surgeon's treatment for venereal disease, while also resorting to quack medicines. Character witnesses attested that Hawkins's behaviour was "always marked with humanity and gentleness"; the court declared the charges to be "scandalous and malicious" and acquitted Hawkins.

== Baltic and Copenhagen ==
In 1807 Dispatch sailed under Commander James Lillicrap for the North Sea, and was at Copenhagen in August. In the spring she convoyed a fleet of transports carrying two divisions of the King's German Legion from the Downs to the island of Rügen off the German Baltic coast where the French were besieging Stralsund, then the capital of Swedish Pomerania. She remained off the coast with a small squadron under Lillicrap to protect the troops. With the assistance of Rosamond, Dispatch covered the eventual evacuation of King Gustavus in a Swedish frigate.

While still on the station, Dispatch, her sister ship Mutine, and Censor fired broadsides at the French outposts near Greifswald. On 21 August Dispatch escorted the last troops to leave Rugen to Kioge Bay in Zealand to join the rest of the army, which had landed five days earlier to prepare for the attack on Copenhagen.

Dispatch was one of six British warships that shared in the capture on 23 August of the Danish vessel Speculation.

When Dispatch joined Admiral James Gambier off Copenhagen, Lillicrap was ordered to mount four long 18-pounders to give Dispatch a greater capability to fight the Danish gunboats. Lillicrap was also to join the inshore squadron as the senior commander under Captain Puget. Dispatch found herself engaging Danish gunboats almost daily. In the general promotion that followed in the capture of the Danish fleet, 17 commanders junior to Lillicrap received promotion; Lillicrap, despite recommendations, did not.

Dispatch sailed for Jamaica on 29 February 1808. In June she recaptured Grinder, Ferguson, master. Grinder had been sailing from Jamaica to the Indian Coast when the French privateer Duguay Trouin had captured her on 7 June off Port Royal. Grinder was taken back to Jamaica.

On the night of 2 October, while off Nevis with a convoy of merchantmen, Dispatch captured the small 1-gun French privateer schooner Dorade, which had a crew of 20 men and mounted one brass gun. Dispatch later retook a captured British merchant ship.

While on the Jamaica station Lillicrap visited Haiti where he spent time with the two contending Haitian chiefs, Henri Christophe and Christophe's co-conspirator and rival, Alexandre Pétion. Christophe would in 1811 become the King of Haiti, and with him Lillicrap visited the Citadelle Laferrière. Lillicrap was promoted to post-captain on 21 October 1810, but did not receive official notification until March 1811, at which time he sailed for home in Naiad. He would then have to wait until January 1815 for his next command (Hyperion).

In November 1810 Dispatch was under Commander James Aberdouor. She left Negril on 20 May 1811 with a convoy for England and arrived at Portsmouth 24 July from Jamaica and St. George's Channel.

== Fate ==
Dispatch was paid off in September 1811. She was broken up at Plymouth that same month.
