= Admiral Lambert =

Admiral Lambert may refer to:

- Cecil Lambert (1864–1928), British Royal Navy admiral
- George Lambert (Royal Navy officer) (1795–1869), British Royal Navy admiral
- Mooy Lambert (c. 1550–1625), Dutch Navy vice admiral
- Paul Lambert (Royal Navy officer) (born 1954), British Royal Navy vice admiral
- Robert Lambert (Royal Navy officer) (1771–1836), British Royal Navy vice admiral
- Rowley Lambert (1828–1880), British Royal Navy vice admiral
