= Duchess of Rutland (1799 ship) =

History

Great Britain
- Builder: Sweden?
- Launched: 1786
- Acquired: 1799 by capture
- Captured: 4 February 1805 & burnt

General characteristics
- Tons burthen: 359, or 400, or 439, or 440 (bm)
- Armament: 6 × 3-pounder guns (LR), or 2 × 18-pounder carronades (RS)

Duchess of Rutland was launched in Sweden in 1786 under another name. She was taken in prize in 1799 and thereafter served as a transport. French frigates captured and burnt her on 4 February 1805 as a consequence of a notable action that resulted in the loss of the two naval vessels escorting the convoy of which she was part. The convoy was sailing from Malta to London.

== Career ==
Duchess of Rutland first appeared in Lloyd's Register (LR) and the Register of Shipping (RS) in 1799. LR gave her country of origin as Sweden and her launch year as 1786. RS simply noted that she had been taken in prize in 1799.

Year	Master	Owner	Trade	Source & notes
1799	Linklater	Nesbitt; Manners	London transport	LR
1799	Linklater	Manners	London transport	RS

Duchess of Rutland arrived at Portsmouth on 4 August 1803 together with a number of other transports and armed ships carrying troops from Egypt and Malta.

Year	Master	Owner	Trade	Source & notes
1805	Pascall	Manners	London transport	LR; small repairs 1800
1805	J. Posgate	Manners	Government service	rs; small repairs 1800 & 1804

== Fate ==
Duchess of Rutland was one of a convoy of some 30 merchant vessels that left Malta on 4 January 1805, bound for England. The convoy escorts were HMS Acheron and Arrow.

Between 19 and 22 January, bad weather off the coast of Spain caused the convoy to separate into two parts, one with Arrow and the other with Acheron. During the night of 29 January the brig Union apparently foundered with all hands during a squall.

On 3 February 1805 the convoy encountered the French frigates Hortense and Incorruptible. Captain Richard Budd Vincent of Arrow signaled to Duchess of Rutland, the most capable, though minimally so, of the merchant vessels, to join the action, a signal Duchess of Rutland ignored.

Arrow and Acheron were able to save the majority of the vessels of the convoy by their resistance before they were compelled to strike. Arrow sank almost immediately after surrendering, and Acheron was so badly damaged that the French burnt her.

The French also captured three ships of the convoy; the rest of the convoy escaped. One of the merchantmen captured was Dutchess of Rutland, whose master failed to destroy her convoy signals and instructions; fortunately the French had to return to port to effect repairs and did not take advantage of the opportunity this represented. The French scuttled the three merchant vessels they had captured.

Lloyd's List reported that the frigate Incorruptible had captured and burnt the transport Duchess of Rutland, Postgate, master, which had been sailing from Malta to London. Her crew had been taken into Cartagena, Spain.
