= HMS Hyperion (1807) =

Royal Navy fifth-rate frigate

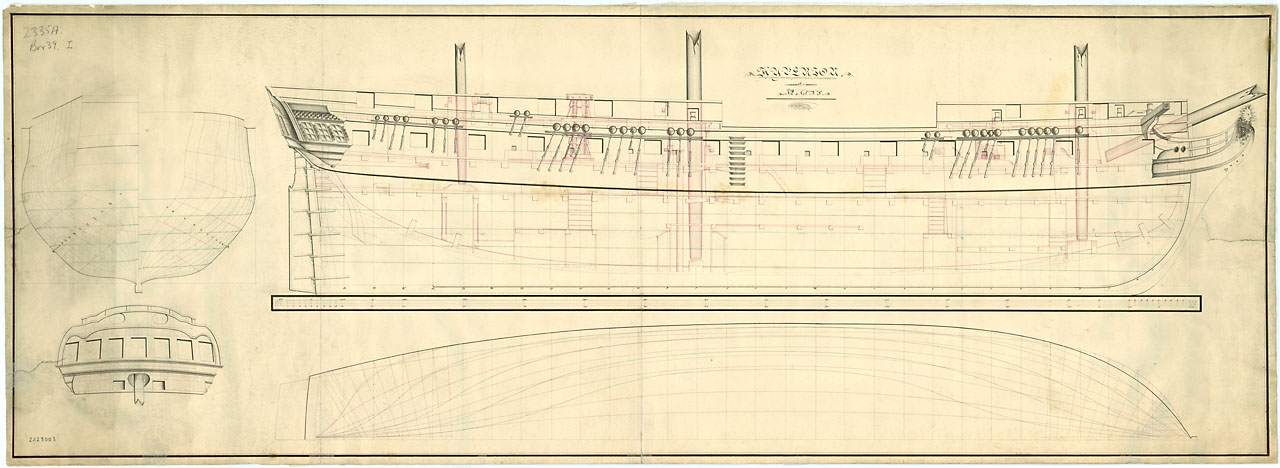
- Lines and profile of Hyperion

History

United Kingdom
- Name: Hyperion
- Namesake: Hyperion
- Ordered: 13 June 1805
- Builder: William Gibson, Kingston upon Hull
- Cost: £20,165
- Laid down: February 1806
- Launched: 3 November 1807
- Commissioned: January 1808
- Out of service: May 1831
- Fate: Broken up June 1833

General characteristics
- Class & type: Fifth-rate frigate
- Tons burthen: 97834/94 (bm)
- Length: 143 ft 9 in (43.8 m) (upper deck); 118 ft 7 5/8 in (36.2 m) (keel)
- Beam: 39 ft 4 1/2 in (12.0 m)
- Draught: 10 ft (3.0 m) (forward); 13 ft 6 in (4.1 m) (aft)
- Depth of hold: 12 ft 4 in (3.8 m)
- Propulsion: Sails
- Complement: 254
- Armament: UD: 26 × 18-pounder guns; QD: 2 × 9-pounder guns + 10 × 24-pounder carronades; Fc: 4 × 9-pounder guns + 2 × 24-pounder carronades

HMS Hyperion was a 32-gun frigate of the Royal Navy. Copied from the design of the French frigate Magicienne, she was commissioned in 1808. Under the command of Thomas Brodie, she served in the Mediterranean Sea for two years before moving to the Jamaica Station. In February 1811, an incident at Gonaïves resulted in Haitians killing three members of Hyperion's crew, and Brodie died of an illness probably caught there. Now commanded by William Pryce Cumby, Hyperion served on the Newfoundland Station on fishery protection duties in 1812, returning in the following year to serve in the English Channel and Bay of Biscay, where she captured the American privateer Rattlesnake on 3 June 1814.

Recommissioned after the end of the Napoleonic Wars, Hyperion briefly served off Portsmouth as an escort to George, Prince Regent, before she was transferred to the South America Station in 1820 to protect trade impacted by the Chilean War of Independence. Hyperion was present at Callao when the Spanish frigate Esmeralda was captured by Chile on 5 November. Hyperion's captain, Thomas Searle, fostered such a negative relationship with the Chilean naval commander Lord Cochrane that soon afterwards the frigate was ordered back to Britain. Under James Lillicrap Hyperion then joined the Cape of Good Hope Station in 1821, moving to combat piracy off Cuba in the following year. The ship returned to Britain in 1824 and was used as a base for anti-smuggling operations at Newhaven from 1825 to 1831 before being broken up in 1833.

== Design and construction ==
Hyperion was an 18-pounder fifth-rate frigate. (Note: Ships of the Royal Navy were categorised in a rating system. Fifth-rate ships were those holding between thirty and forty-four guns, and usually frigates. They were smaller than fourth-rates, of fifty and sixty guns, but larger than sixth-rates, of twenty to thirty guns.) Frigates were three-masted, full-rigged ships that carried their main battery on a single, continuous gun deck. They were smaller and faster than ships of the line and primarily intended for raiding, reconnaissance and messaging. During the Napoleonic Wars the Royal Navy mostly produced frigates from three well-developed designs. (Note: The 38-gun Leda and Lively classes and 36-gun Apollo class.) In 1805 the First Lord of the Admiralty, Lord Barham, briefly deviated from this to order three unique vessels copied from French designs. Hyperion was one of these frigates; designed by the Surveyor of the Navy, Sir John Henslow, the ship was based on the lines of the 32-gun frigate HMS Magicienne, which had been captured from the French in 1781. Despite her age Magicienne was a popular vessel, although she was smaller than most modern frigates.

The frigate was ordered on 13 June 1805 to be built at Kingston upon Hull by William Gibson. He was a private shipbuilder who had built a new yard on the River Hull that year to compete for Royal Navy contracts; Hyperion was the largest ship he constructed. The ship was laid down in February 1806 and launched on 3 November 1807. Hyperion had the following dimensions: 143 feet 9 inches (43.8 m) along the gun deck, 118 feet 7 5/8 inches (36.2 m) at the keel, with a beam of 39 feet 4 1/2 inches (12 m) and a depth in the hold of 12 feet 4 inches (3.8 m). Her draught was 10 feet (3 m) forward and 13 feet 6 inches (4.1 m) aft, and the ship was calculated at 978 34/94 tons burthen. Hyperion was fitted out at Chatham Dockyard between 9 December and 23 April 1808, having cost £20,165 to complete (equivalent to £1,474,058 in 2023). She was named Hyperion after the mythical Titan Hyperion, the first Royal Navy warship to bear the name.

Hyperion had a complement of 254. The ship held twenty-six 18-pounder long guns on her upper deck, supported by two 9-pounder long guns and ten 24-pounder carronades on her quarterdeck and a further four 9-pounders and two 24-pounder carronades on her forecastle.

=== Characteristics ===
The design mirrored many of the characteristics of the original French Magicienne plan. Hyperion had a shallow hull which produced a fast ship but left her liable to drift to leeward and resulted in the ship becoming excessively damp when sailing in rough seas, as the gun ports were only 5 feet 11 inches (1.8 m) above the water. She also struggled to stow a full set of provisions because of the smaller hold the design created, with most available space taken up by the magazine.

Headroom was confined below decks, and officers who served in Hyperion complained that they were not able to stand up straight in the wardroom. Hyperion proved to be faster than the other 32-gun frigate based on a French design, HMS Bucephalus, and was in fact larger than the third ship produced, HMS Pyramus, despite her being a 36-gun frigate. The ship sailed and handled well even in the heaviest of conditions, and usually reached between 12 knots (22.2 km/h) and 12.5 knots (23.2 km/h), with her top recorded speed at 13.5 knots (25 km/h). (Note: In comparison Pyramus reached 13 knots (24 km/h) and Bucephalus 10 knots (18.5 km/h).)

== Service ==
=== Mediterranean ===
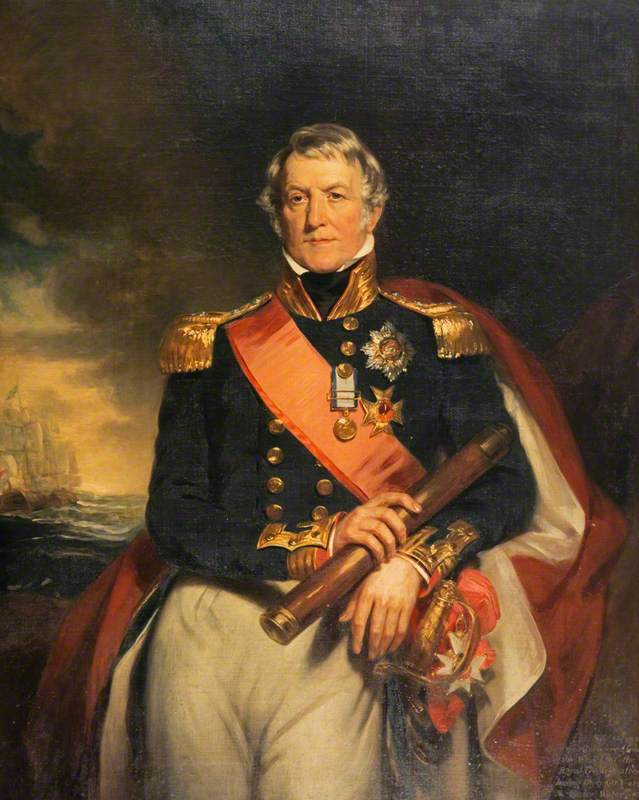
Philip Charles Durham travelled in Hyperion during her first commission

Hyperion was commissioned by Captain Thomas Brodie in January 1808. The frigate sailed to serve in the Mediterranean Sea on 29 June, and in early July passed through Admiral Sir Charles Cotton's squadron off the River Tagus, giving him the news that Lieutenant-General Sir Arthur Wellesley was shortly to land in the Iberian Peninsula to begin the Peninsular War.

Travelling on board Hyperion were Captain Philip Charles Durham, joining his ship at Minorca, and the politicians Robert Adair and Stratford Canning, destined for Constantinople. While sailing off Portugal Brodie, an inexperienced sailor, ordered Hyperion to prepare for action upon sighting what he thought were enemy warships. Durham informed him he was preparing to attack the Berlengas, rather than any ships. A few days later Hyperion narrowly avoided wrecking at Sanlúcar de Barrameda. Brodie became a figure of ridicule on board when he ordered the ship's geese be killed to ensure their cackling did not give them away to enemy ships. As the journey continued Adair and Canning lost confidence in Brodie, and when the ship reached Palermo they went ashore and had Captain John Stewart of the 38-gun frigate HMS Seahorse take them the rest of the way instead.

On 3 August 1809 Hyperion sailed from Gibraltar conveying the poet Lord Byron to Cádiz, arriving there on the following day. The journey provided inspiration for a similar journey in Byron's Don Juan.

=== Jamaica and Haiti ===
Having continued to serve in the Mediterranean, Hyperion moved to the Jamaica Station on 14 January 1810. At the time, Haiti was split into two rival governments: the Republic of Haiti, led by Alexandre Pétion, and the State of Haiti, ruled by Henri Christophe, with the two engaging in a low-intensity conflict. The small Haitian Navy, loyal to Christophe, blockaded ports held by Pétion and in May captured the British merchantman Crown as she attempted to enter Môle-Saint-Nicolas. The Haitians took Crown to Port-de-Paix to offload her cargo, and while making the journey the ship was stopped by Hyperion. Brodie boarded the captured vessel but chose not to intervene. The owners of Crown complained to the commander of the Jamaica Station, Vice-Admiral Bartholomew Rowley, that Hyperion was at fault for their loss of $60,000 (equivalent to $1,235,106 in 2025) worth of goods. Rowley sided with Brodie's opinion that the ship had been lawfully seized, but promised to send an officer to request restitution.

Hyperion's involvement with Haiti continued into the following year. In late January 1811, she arrived at Gonaïves for supplies. There, a British merchant named Richard Simpson smuggled a letter on board explaining that he had been detained by the Haitians while travelling to Jérémie, and was being held under guard at Gonaïves by another British merchant, Matthew O'Brien. Brodie quietly brought Simpson on board Hyperion, but on 1 February the Haitian commandant at Gonaïves demanded his return. Brodie spoke with O'Brien and other British merchants ashore, who were fearful of reprisals if Simpson did not come back. Upon hearing this Simpson voluntarily returned to custody and Brodie stayed ashore, dining with the merchant community. On 2 February a launch on a supply run from Hyperion was fired on by Fort Castries, killing three seamen. Under orders to fire on any boat after Simpson's failed escape, the battery's commander was arrested by Haitian authorities. There are different accounts of what happened after this. The historian Hubert Cole reports that Brodie peacefully accepted a military funeral for the dead sailors and left Gonaïves, arriving at Port Royal on 17 February.

The historian Peter Hore instead describes the attack on the launch as the prelude to Brodie and two other officers being detained ashore by the Haitians. In this account Brodie was only able to return to Hyperion after the ship's first lieutenant, Lieutenant James Morgan, brought the frigate through a channel only 4 fathoms (7.3 m) deep, and sent an ultimatum to the Haitians that if the officers were not released he would destroy the town and capture the Haitian frigate anchored there.

Upon returning to Jamaica, Brodie reported the incident at Gonaïves to Rowley, who reprimanded him for not demanding a written apology for the killings. Captain James Vashon in the 36-gun frigate HMS Thalia was sent to rectify this, but the Haitians defended their conduct and Christophe, insulted by Vashon's behaviour, unsuccessfully attempted to incite a duel with him. Brodie remained with Hyperion at Jamaica where, on 14 March, he died of an illness probably caught during his time on Haiti. He was replaced on 26 March by Captain William Pryce Cumby who, after the death of Rowley in October, sailed Hyperion to Portsmouth Dockyard for a refit, stopping at Veracruz and Havana.

=== North America ===
Hyperion sailed to join the Newfoundland Station on 13 May 1812, protecting the whale fisheries amongst icebergs in the Davis Strait. After a summer of this duty, and with the War of 1812 ongoing, the ship served as a convoy escort between Newfoundland and Barbados. Returning to harbour at St. John's, Hyperion spent the winter frozen in there. By April 1813 the ship was struggling with desertion, but Cumby failed in a petition to begin a press gang on land.

The ship left Newfoundland on 10 November as escort to a convoy of thirty-seven ships destined for Portugal. Hit by severe storms, by 25 November only sixteen ships remained in company. Splitting the convoy, Hyperion took six ships towards Porto. With the weather too poor to enter the harbour, they redirected to Corunna and were beset by another storm. By 6 December Hyperion had lost the entire convoy. With her upper works damaged and both pumps broken, Cumby diverted the frigate towards Portsmouth, meeting with another battered convoy under the escort of the 44-gun frigate HMS Iris.

=== Home service ===
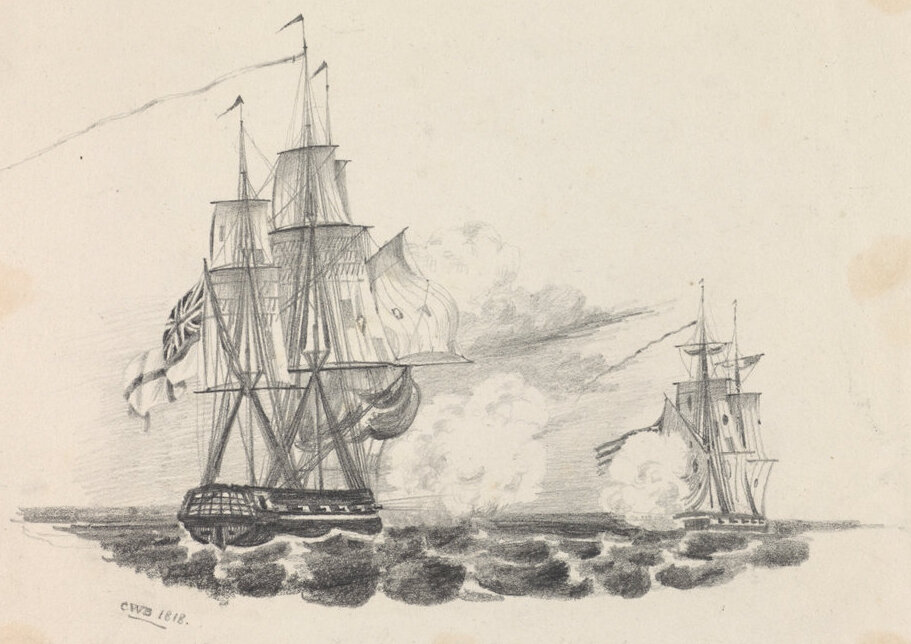
Hyperion captures Rattlesnake on 3 June 1814

Hyperion continued on in Europe, patrolling the English Channel and Bay of Biscay. In the latter location she captured the American 16-gun privateer brig Rattlesnake on 3 June 1814. Cumby was replaced in command temporarily by Captain James Lillicrap on 24 January the following year, who sailed the frigate to Lisbon before escorting a convoy from Porto. With the wars over, the ship was paid off on 31 August and laid up at Portsmouth.

Between June and November 1818 Hyperion was repaired and prepared for sea at Portsmouth. As part of this her water storage, usually wooden casks, was replaced with iron tanks, increasing the dangerously low distance from gun port to waterline by 3 inches (0.1 m). While this work was underway she was recommissioned by Captain Thomas Searle on 1 September. The ship initially served at Portsmouth in attendance on George, Prince Regent, while he sailed off the coast there. The poet John Keats and his friend Charles Armitage Brown watched Hyperion on 12 August 1819 as she sailed off Cowes alongside HMY Royal George, describing the scene as "silent, light and graceful".

=== South America ===
Hyperion was subsequently sent to the South America Station. With the Chilean War of Independence underway, the frigate was assigned to escort merchant ships, as while Spanish Peru allowed neutral transport, Chile would seize such vessels in Peruvian waters. Hyperion arrived off the Chilean port of Valparaíso in February 1820. Lord Cochrane, fighting for the Chilean Navy, had embargoed three British merchantmen there to avoid word of planned attacks on Peru being revealed. Searle obtained permission from Bernardo O'Higgins, Supreme Director of Chile, for the ships to be released, but Cochrane was not made aware and refused to allow it. O'Higgins reiterated his permission on 25 April but by 5 May two of the merchant ships remained at Valparaíso. With Cochrane still not permitting the vessels to leave, on 7 May Searle ordered one, Inspector, to weigh anchor under the protection of Hyperion. The frigate sailed with her gun ports open and broadside ready, and Cochrane chose not to resist the departure. Commodore Sir Thomas Hardy, commanding the station, received an official complaint from the Chilean government, and personally disapproved of the action. Over the following months the relationship between Searle and Cochrane deteriorated further when the Chileans detained another British merchant ship.

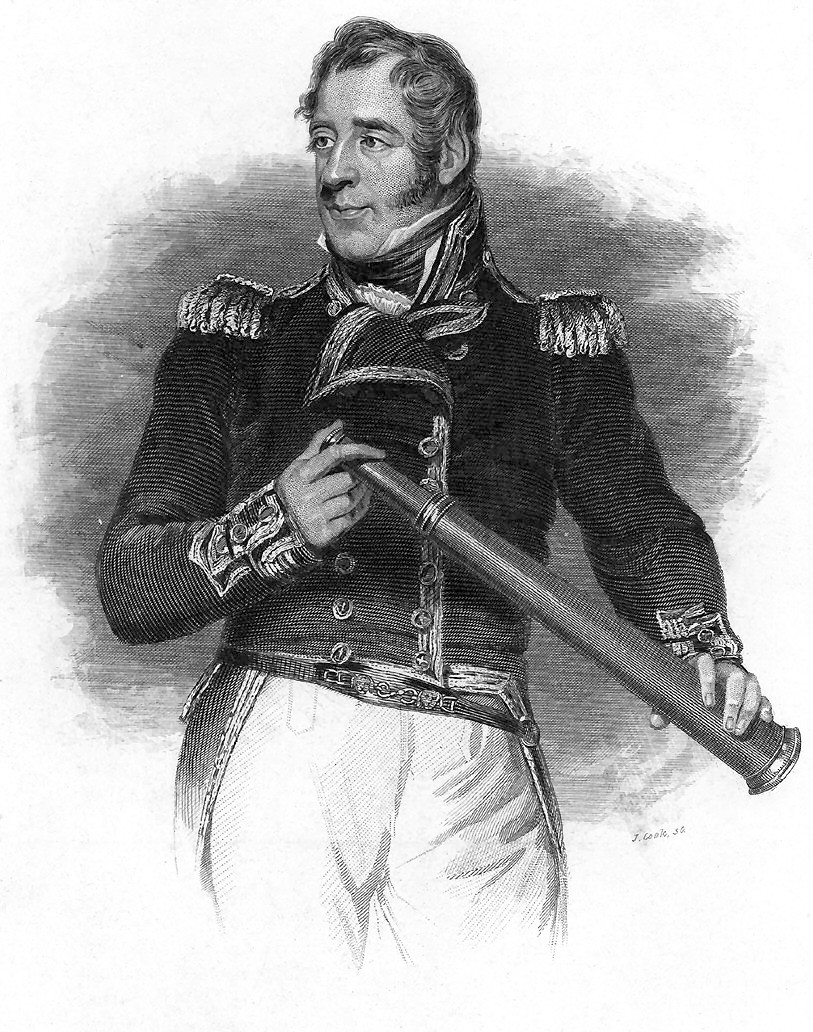
The bitter relationship of Hyperion's captain with Lord Cochrane resulted in the frigate being withdrawn from South America

With Searle as acting senior officer of the British Pacific Squadron, on 14 April Hyperion received the first news from the explorer William Smith in the brig William that he had discovered the South Shetland Islands. Searle ordered the crew of William not to go ashore at Valparaíso to prevent the news from spreading, and forwarded it to the Admiralty. This was standard procedure for the handling of expedition findings, ensuring that any political or economical advantage from the discovery was not squandered. Hyperion was stationed off the Peruvian port of Callao by October. Towards the end of the month Hyperion met with Cochrane again there, with the latter in the 50-gun frigate O'Higgins. Upon seeing Cochrane, Searle had Hyperion loose her guns, causing Cochrane to infer that Searle thought him to be a pirate and was prepared to attack him as such.

Hyperion was still off Callao on 5 November, alongside the American 38-gun frigate USS Macedonian, when Cochrane cut out the Spanish 40-gun frigate Esmeralda there. Searle observed strict neutrality during the fight in the port, not acknowledging the attackers as their boats went past the ship, while the crew of Macedonian cheered Cochrane's force. (Note: The sentries on Hyperion loudly called their challenges to the attacking boats as they attempted to pass by in secrecy, and Searle threatened to arrest one of his midshipmen who started cheering when Esmeralda was boarded.) As the captured frigate sailed out, Cochrane had Esmeralda copy the pattern of lights being hoisted by Hyperion and Macedonian in order to confuse the defenders, who he knew would want to avoid hitting a neutral vessel. The attack was completed in half an hour, and Searle had to quickly move Hyperion out of the way to avoid Spanish return fire, with the ship being hit several times. Despite his neutral posture, he reported the action as a "most brilliant affair". The population of Callao believed the two neutral ships must have colluded in the attack, and when a boat from Macedonian landed on the following day, it was attacked, and two men were killed. A boat from Hyperion intervened to stop further damage.

Searle's relationship with the Chileans did not thaw after this. When the British merchantman Pacific arrived at Callao on 21 November, an officer was sent from O'Higgins with a communique about the vessel. Searle refused to receive the letter, throwing it overboard, ostensibly to retain his neutrality. His behaviour was so diplomatically egregious that the Admiralty had to take action, noting that he had been

"Intemperate and injudicious; and as repetition of it might, and probably would, be attended with consequences highly injurious to the public interest, their Lordships direct that Hyperion be removed from the South American station".

Hyperion took on board specie worth $1,500,000 (equivalent to $31,549,000 in 2025) from British merchants at Callao, and then sailed for Britain on 10 December, also conveying the artist Augustus Earle. Some of this specie was actually fraudulent, being lead inside the sealed boxes rather than silver. This was the first major shipment of specie from South America to be protected privately for a profit by a warship, in a system that would continue for the next century.

=== Cape of Good Hope and anti-piracy ===
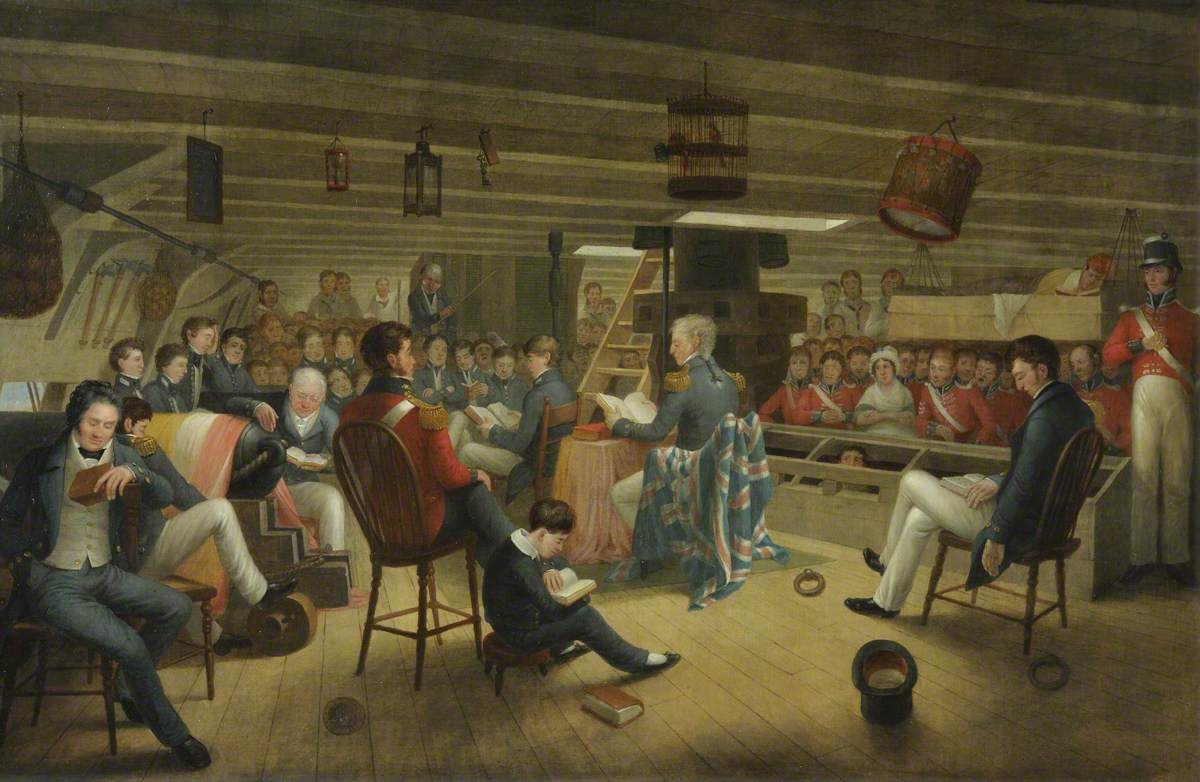
Divine service on the gun deck of a frigate, by Augustus Earle, based on a service on Hyperion

The ship was paid off in April 1821 but recommissioned in the same month, with Lillicrap again in command from 6 April. Sent to serve on the Cape of Good Hope Station, Hyperion sailed from Plymouth in September with the governor of the Cape Colony, Lord Charles Somerset, on board. The ship arrived in Table Bay on 30 November. Lillicrap assumed command of the station as a commodore, with Hyperion as his flagship. On 10 June 1822 the squadron saved the East Indiaman Albion from wrecking in Simon's Bay during a storm, and also rescued two Russian warships.

In the same year Lillicrap was superseded as commodore, and Hyperion sailed to the West Indies to again join the Jamaica Station. With piracy rife off Cuba, Rear-Admiral Sir Charles Rowley sent Hyperion there on 6 October to co-ordinate with the governor of Cuba, Sebastián Kindelán. Lillicrap had orders to violate Spanish territory if Kindelán refused to act against the pirates, but the Spaniard was supportive, providing Lillicrap with letters of authority to assist in combatting the pirate base at Bahía Honda. Lillicrap was moved to the 74-gun ship of the line HMS Gloucester on 24 October 1823 and replaced by Captain George Rich. Hyperion continued in the West Indies until 15 May 1824 when she sailed from Port Royal to return to Britain, having been deemed unfit for further service. She arrived at Portsmouth on 19 June and then sailed to Woolwich Dockyard to be paid off.

=== Final years ===
Hyperion was fitted for anti-smuggling duties at Sheerness Dockyard between January and March 1825. Recommissioned in the same January, she arrived at Newhaven in March under the command of Captain William Mingaye to serve as the centre of the Sussex Coast Blockade. She was towed into position by the navy's first steamship, HMS Comet. The majority of the crew was sent ashore to serve in Martello towers, while Hyperion stayed at the port alongside two tenders, HMS Highflyer and HMS Viper. Towards the end of March men from Hyperion seized the sloop Dart at Rye for smuggling liquor, and she was brought in as a third tender.

Hyperion continued at Newhaven until May 1831 when the Coast Blockade was replaced by the Coast Guard. The frigate had not moved in six years, and so instead of attempting to make sail she was towed away by the steam vessel HMS Columbia on 12 May. Paid off, Hyperion was taken to Portsmouth where she lay until being broken up there in June 1833.
