= Joseph Nourse (Royal Navy officer) =

Royal Navy officer (1779–1824)

Captain Joseph Nourse CB
- Born: 23 June 1779
- Died: 4 September 1824 (aged 45); Mauritius
- Military career
- Allegiance: United Kingdom
- Branch: Royal Navy
- Service years: 1793–1824
- Rank: Post captain
- Commands: Cape of Good Hope Station
- Conflicts: War of 1812
- Awards: Companion of the Order of the Bath

Captain Joseph Nourse CB (23 June 1779 – 4 September 1824) was a Royal Navy officer who became commander-in-chief of the Cape of Good Hope Station.

== Naval career ==
Nourse joined the Royal Navy in 1793 and, having been promoted, to captain, was given command of the frigate HMS Fridericksteen. He transferred to the command of the fourth-rate HMS Severn and took part in the capture and burning of Washington on 24 August 1814 during the War of 1812. He became commander-in-chief of the Cape of Good Hope Station in 1822, engaged with combating the slave trade, before dying of malaria in Mauritius in 1824.

Military offices
Preceded by James Lillicrap	Commander-in-Chief, Cape of Good Hope Station; 1822–1824	Succeeded by Robert Moorsom
