= Karamania =

Region in Asiatic Turkey

In the 18th and 19th centuries, Karamania (or Caramania) was an exonym used by Europeans for the southern (Mediterranean) coast of Anatolia, then part of the Ottoman Empire (current Turkey). It can also refer to the general south central Anatolian region, whose name is reflected on the modern town of Karaman. It is also the namesake of the larger Karaman Province of Turkey, the historical Karaman Eyalet of the Ottoman Empire, the medieval Turkish Karamanids dynasty and state from the region, and the Karamanlides, a Turkish-speaking Orthodox Christian group originally from the area.

== Francis Beaufort and the Term Karamania ==
In 1811–12, Francis Beaufort, then the captain of HMS Fredericksteen in the British Navy, was tasked with mapping the Mediterranean coast of Anatolia. In 1817, he published a book about his services, titled Brief description of the south coast of Asia-Minor and of the remains of antiquity. With plans, views, & collected during a survey of that coast, under the orders of the Lords commissioners of the Admiralty, in the years 1811-1812. In the preface of the book he called the southern coasts of Anatolia as Karamania but he added that although the name was a common name among the Europeans, neither the people nor the government of the Ottoman Empire used this name.

== History ==
The Karamanids (Turkish: Karamanoğulları) was a historical dynasty that ruled a state in the region between late 13th and late 15th centuries. The state was founded by a Turkmen tribe, led by Karaman Bey, and it was finally incorporated into Ottoman realm during the reign of Mehmed II of the Ottoman Empire. (See Kasım of Karaman.) The Karamanid state was founded in the southern half of the Central Anatolia. At the zenith of its power it also controlled the central portion of the Mediterranean coast of Anatolia (roughly Cilicia Trachea of the antiquity, the eastern half of the modern Antalya Province and the western half of the modern Mersin Province.) After its territory was annexed by the Ottomans two names from the Karamanid era survived; present city of Karaman (then known as Larende in Central Anatolia) which was the capital city of Karamanids and (up to 1920s) the minority people named Karamanlides. (Although Karamanids were Muslim, Karamanlides were a Turkish-speaking Christian minority of the region who emigrated to Greece during the Greek-Turkish population exchange in the 1920s).

== Geography ==
In his book, Sir Francis Beaufort referred to all of the southern coast of Anatolia as Caramania or Karamania. This name referred to a wide region from Yediburun (Mount Cragus) to Ayas (Aegeae) where Beaufort was wounded during a clash. This region is from 36°24′N 29°07′E in the west to 36°47′N 35°50′E in the east, almost lying at the same latitude but spanning a longitude difference of more than 6 degrees which corresponds to about 600 kilometres (370 mi) bird's flight. Presently it corresponds to the coast line of three Turkish provinces: Antalya, Mersin and Adana. Even at the zenith of their power, however, the Karamanids controlled only one third of this coast.

Map of Turkey showing some of the places described by Beaufort.
Some of Beaufort's images of Karamania
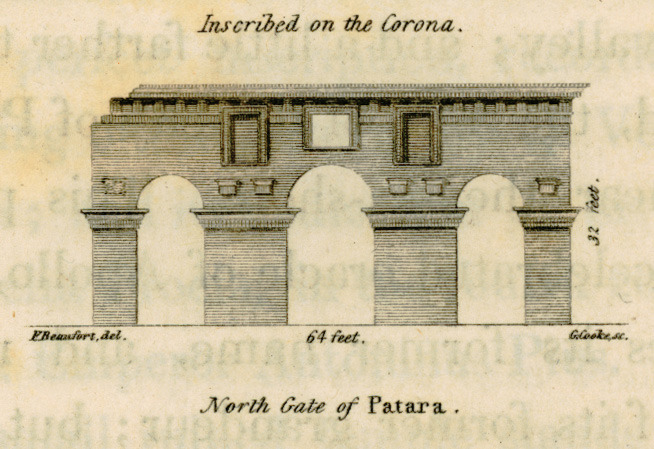
North gate of Patara

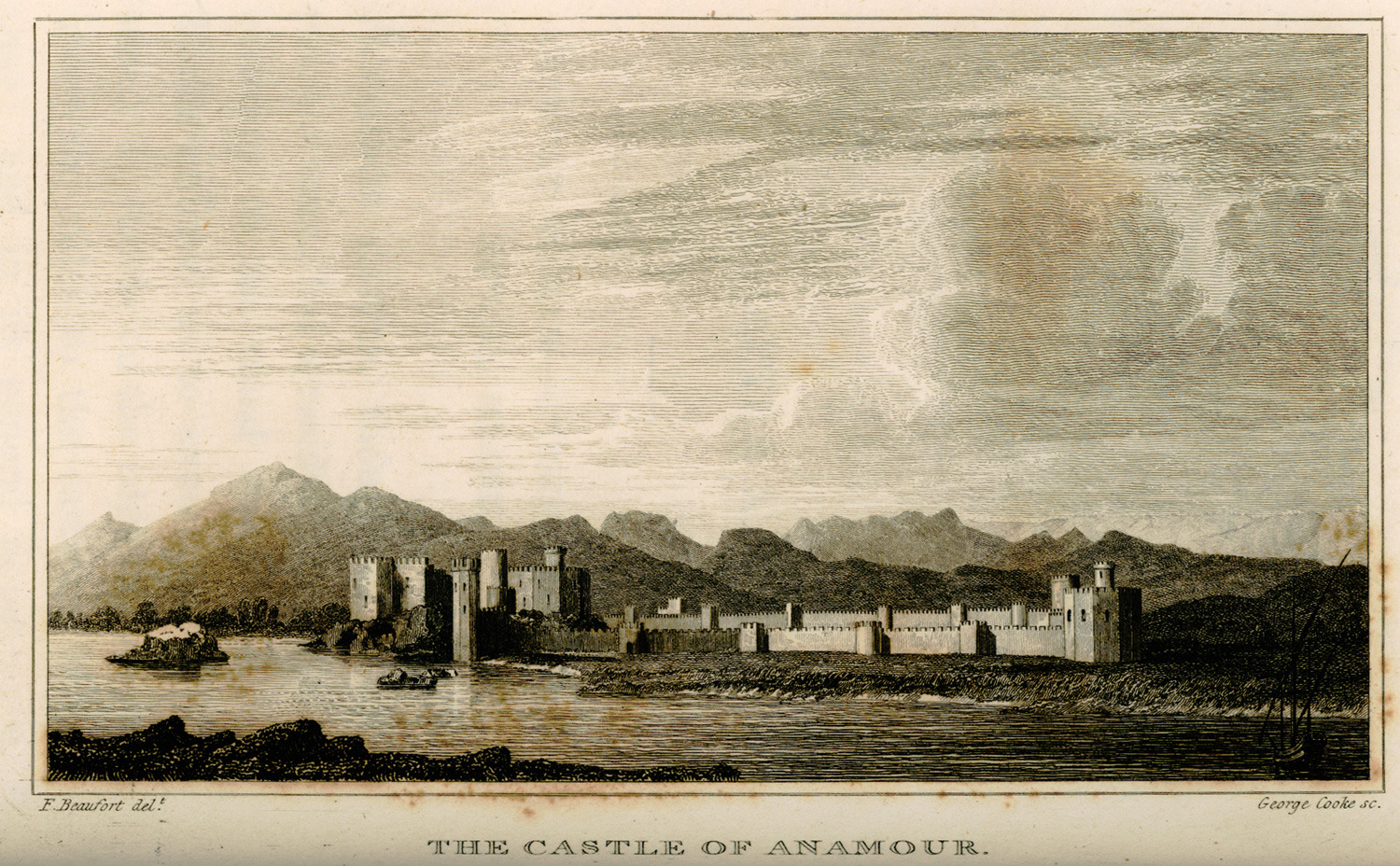
The Castle of Anamour

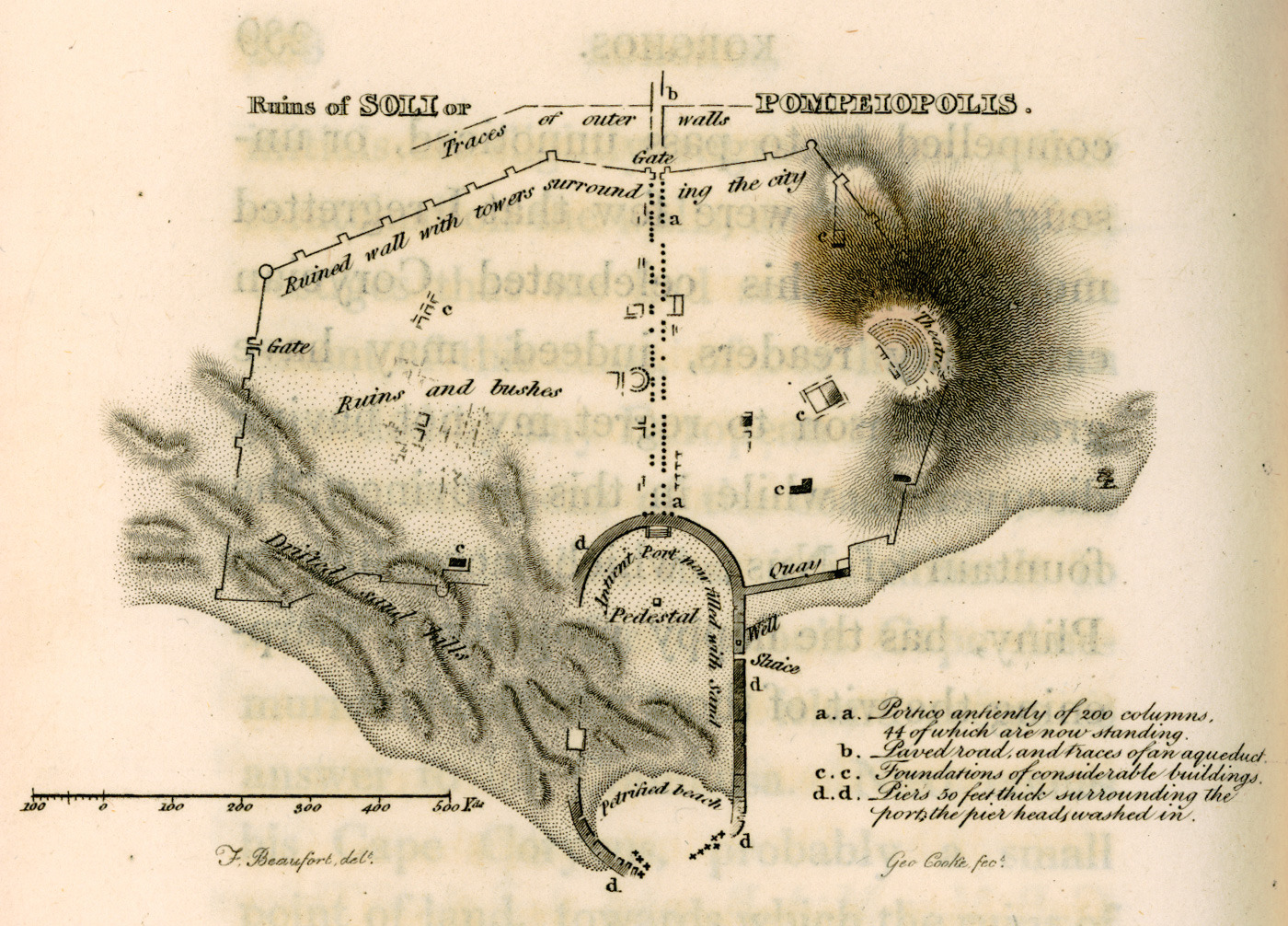
Map of Pompeiopolis
