= James Lillicrap =

British Royal Navy officer (died 1851)

Rear-Admiral James Lillicrap
- Died: 9 July 1851
- Military career
- Allegiance: United Kingdom
- Branch: Royal Navy
- Service years: 1780–1833
- Rank: Rear-Admiral
- Commands: HMS Dispatch; Cape of Good Hope Station; HMS Gloucester
- Conflicts: French Revolutionary Wars; Gunboat War

Rear-Admiral James Lillicrap (died 9 July 1851) was a Royal Navy officer who became commander-in-chief of the Cape of Good Hope Station.

== Naval career ==
Lillicrap joined the Royal Navy in September 1780. He saw action at the Second Battle of Algeciras in July 1801 during the French Revolutionary Wars and commanded the sloop HMS Dispatch at the Battle of Copenhagen in August 1807 during the Gunboat War. Promoted to captain in October 1810, he was given command of the fifth-rate HMS Hyperion in January 1815. He became commander-in-chief of the Cape of Good Hope Station, with the rank of Commodore, in September 1821 and, after commanding the third-rate HMS Gloucester from October 1823 to March 1824, became Captain-Superintendent at Portsmouth in April 1830 before retiring in June 1833. He was "promoted to the rank of Retired Rear Admiral of Her Majesty's Fleet" in 1846.

== Sources ==
- O'Byrne, William Richard (1849). "Lillicrap, James" . A Naval Biographical Dictionary . John Murray – via Wikisource.

Military offices
Preceded by Robert Lambert	Commander-in-Chief, Cape of Good Hope Station; 1821–1822	Succeeded by Joseph Nourse
