= Thomas Searle =

Royal Navy officer (1777–1849)

Rear-Admiral Thomas Searle CB
- Born: 29 May 1777; Devon
- Died: 18 March 1849 (aged 71)
- Spouse: Ann Maddock (m. 1796)
- Military career
- Allegiance: United Kingdom
- Branch: Royal Navy
- Service years: 1789–1849
- Rank: Rear-Admiral
- Commands: HMS Courier; HMS Perseus; HMS Helder; HMS Autumn; HMS Fury; HMS Grasshopper; HMS Fridericksteen; HMS Hannibal; HMS Elizabeth; HMS Druid; HMS Hyperion; HMS Victory
- Conflicts: French Revolutionary Wars; Napoleonic Wars; Raid on Boulogne; Action of 4 April 1808; Siege of Tarifa

Rear-Admiral Thomas Searle CB (29 May 1777 – 18 March 1849) was a British Royal Navy officer.

== Biography ==
Searle was the son of James Searle of Staddlescombe, Devonshire. He was born on 29 May 1777. He entered the navy in November 1789, served on the Mediterranean, home, and Newfoundland stations, and in 1796 was in the Royal George, flagship of Lord Bridport, by whose interest he was made lieutenant, on 19 August, to the Incendiary fireship. In 1797 he was in the Prince, flagship of Sir Roger Curtis; in 1798, in the Nemesis frigate, on the North American station, and in 1799 commanded the Courier cutter in the North Sea. On 26 November 1799 he was made commander on the recommendation of Lord Duncan, who was greatly pleased with his activity during the year, and especially with his gallant capture of a large French privateer on 23 November From June 1800 to October 1802 he was employed in the transport service; and from July 1803 to April 1804, with the Portsmouth division of sea-fencibles. During 1804–1805–6, he commanded various small vessels off Boulogne and the north coast of France, and in December 1806 was appointed to the Grasshopper brig for service in the Mediterrean. His service in the Grasshopper was marked, even in that age, ‘as dashing in the extreme.’ On 11 December 1807, off Cape Palos, he engaged a heavily armed Spanish brig of war with two settees in company; captured the brig and drove the settees to seek safety in flight. Lord Collingwood officially reported the affair as ‘an instance of the zeal and enterprise which marked Searle's general conduct.’ On 4 April 1808, in company with the Alceste and Mercury frigates, he assisted in destroying or capturing a convoy of merchant vessels at Rota, near Cadiz, after dispersing or sinking the gunboats that escorted them, and silencing the batteries of Rota, which protected them. This last service was performed by the brig alone ‘by the extraordinary gallantry and good conduct of Captain Searle, who kept in upon the shoal to the southward of the town so near as to drive the enemy from their guns with grape from his carronades, and at the same time kept in check a division of the gunboats that had come out from Cadiz to assist the others engaged by the Alcestes and Mercury. It was a general cry in both ships: “Only look how nobly the brig behaves”’ ([Sir] Murray Maxwell to the secretary of the admiralty, Gazette, 1808, p. 570). Consequent on Maxwell's letter Searle was advanced to post rank on 28 April 1808, though the promotion did not reach him till July; and meanwhile, on 23 April, being in company with the Rapid brig, on the south coast of Portugal, he fell in with two richly laden Spanish vessels from South America, under convoy of four gunboats. The merchant ships ran in under the batteries of Faro, by which they were protected; but the brigs, having captured two of the gunboats, driven the other two on shore, and silenced the batteries, brought off the ships, with cargoes of the value of 60,000l.

On leaving the Grasshopper, Searle was presented by the crew with a sword of the value of eighty guineas, and shortly after, by Lloyd's, with a piece of plate worth one hundred guineas. In 1809 he commanded the Frederickstein in the Mediterranean; in 1810–11, the Elizabeth in the North Sea and at Lisbon; and in 1811–12, the Druid in the Mediterranean. On 4 June 1815 he was nominated a C.B. In 1818–21 he commanded the Hyperion frigate in the Channel (in attendance upon George IV) and in a voyage to South America, whence he brought back specie to the amount of half a million sterling. From 1836 to 1839 he was captain of the Victory, then guardship at Portsmouth; and on 9 Nov. 1846 was promoted to the rank of rear-admiral. He died at Kingston House, Portsea, on 18 March 1849, and was buried at the garrison chapel, Portsmouth. He is described as a man of middle height, strongly built, black hair, dark complexion, and remarkably handsome. He married, in November 1796, Ann, daughter of Joseph Maddock of Plymouth Dockyard and Tamerton Foliot, and by her had a large family; eight daughters survived him.
