= HMS Fridericksteen =

Frigate of the Royal Navy

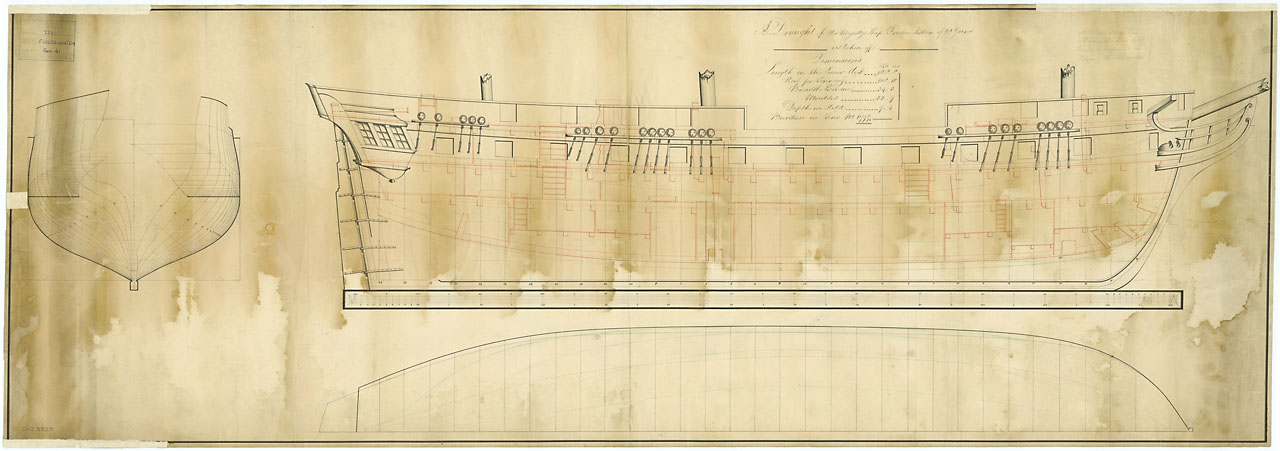
- Scale 1:48. Plan showing the body plan, sheer lines with inboard detail, and longitudinal half breadth for Frederickstein, as taken off prior to her fitting as a 28-gun, fifth-rate frigate for the British Royal Navy.

History

Denmark & Norway
- Name: Friderichssteen
- Builder: Hohlenberg
- Laid down: 22 May 1800
- Launched: 11 November 1800
- Commissioned: 1802
- Fate: Surrendered to the British after the Battle of Copenhagen (1807)

United Kingdom
- Name: Frederickstein
- Acquired: Captured from Denmark 7 September 1807
- Commissioned: 1808
- Renamed: Theresa, but the intent was withdrawn c.1809
- Fate: Broken up June 1813

General characteristics (Note: Alternate measurements are from the National Maritime Museum's database.)
- Class & type: Fifth-rate frigate
- Tons burthen: 67917/94 (bm)
- Length: 128 ft 8 in (39.2 m) (gundeck), or; 129 ft 4 in (39.4 m); 108 ft 10 in (33.2 m)(keel), or; 109 ft 3 in (33.3 m)
- Beam: 34 ft 3 in (10.4 m), or; 34 ft 2 in (10.4 m)
- Depth of hold: 9 ft 4 in (2.8 m)
- Complement: 215 in British service
- Armament: In Danish service: Gundeck: 20 × 30, or 36-pounder carronades; QD & Fc: 4 × 8-pounder guns + 2 × 12-pounder carronades; Also: 6 × 12-pounder iron howitzers + 4 × 1-pounder falconets (Note: The howitzers may have been boat guns (i.e. similar in concept and role to the later Dahlgren boat howitzers), and the falconets appear to have been intended for the fighting tops.); In British service: Upper Deck: 26 × 12-pounder guns; QD: 6 × 24-pounder carronades; Fc: 2 × 6-pounder guns + 2 × 24-pounder carronades

HDMS Friderichssteen or HMS Frederichsteen was a Danish Navy frigate, built in 1800, and captured by the Royal Navy in 1807 at the Battle of Copenhagen. She was taken into service as HMS Fredericksteen (or Frederickstein) and served in the Mediterranean until being finally broken up in 1813.

== Royal Danish Navy ==
Friderichssteen was a 32-gun frigate built to a design by F.C.H. Hohlenberg and launched in 1800. She had a small hull, and consequently lacked the storage capacity for long-endurance cruises to distant stations. She was laid up in 1801 and not fitted out until 1802.

At the end of March 1801 a British fleet arrived at St Thomas, in the Danish West Indies. The Danes accepted the Articles of Capitulation the British proposed and the British occupied the islands without a shot being fired. The British occupation lasted until April 1802, when the British returned the islands to Denmark.

=== 1802–1803 ===
Captain Carl Adolph Roth (1767–1834), sailed Frederikssteen to the Danish West Indies. There he also took his place on the Ruling Commission for the Danish West Indies for matters relating to the naval service. On her return voyage to Denmark in 1803, Frederikssteen carried the retiring Governor General, Major Walterstorff.

=== 1803–1804 ===
Captain Carl Wilhelm Jessen sailed Frederikssteen on her second voyage to the Danish West Indies. As with his predecessor, Part of his remit was to act for the government of the Danish West Indies on all questions of naval service and maritime defence.

=== 1805–1806 ===
During this period Frederikssteen served in home waters under two captains, each of whom died while in command. In 1805 Captain Rasmus Rafn (1764–1805), commanded Frederikssteen, which served in the Evolution (training) Squadron. His successor was Captain Michael Christopher Ulrich (1760–1806). The squadron, of ten vessels, was under the command of Rear-Admiral Otto Lutken, who raised his flag in Fredericksteen.

== Royal Navy ==
After the 1807 Battle of Copenhagen, the Royal Navy took control of most of the Danish Fleet. Fredericksteen was sailed to Portsmouth, where she arrived on 19 November. She underwent fitting between 3 October and 27 February 1809.

She was commissioned under the command of Captain Joseph Nourse in December 1808, who took her on convoy escort to the Mediterranean in June 1809. Captain Thomas Searle replaced Nourse and returned her to the Mediterranean in November that year.

Nourse was in command in 1810 at Smyrna. In May, he wrote a letter explaining the circumstances surrounding taking a schooner from the Ottomans. The taking had become a matter of some dispute between Great Britain and the Ottoman government and Nourse provided his justification. Eight days later Mr. Stratford Canning wrote to Nourse stating that the British Government supported him and his actions fully. Canning explained the problems that were bedeviling the relations between the two governments and suggested gently that in the future Nourse avoid confrontation with the authorities unless absolutely necessary. The English schooner that Nourse removed from Coron was Ann.

Francis Beaufort was promoted to post captain and was appointed to command Fredericksteen in May 1810. However, his duties in the Mediterranean prevented him from taking up this post until December that year. (Note: British records state that in 1811 Captain Francis Beanford sailed her in the Mediterranean on survey duty. "Beanford" appears to be a misspelling for "Beaufort".) Throughout 1811–1812, Beaufort charted and explored southern Anatolia, locating and recording many classical ruins. (Note: His findings were later published in a book entitled Brief description of the south coast of Asia-Minor and of the remains of antiquity. With plans, views, & collected during a survey of that coast, under the orders of the Lords commissioners of the Admiralty, in the years 1811–1812. (see Caramania).)

In October 1811 Beaufort removed property from a "pirate boat", and on 3 December Frederickstein captured the polacca Teresina. An attack on the crew of his boat (at Ayas, near Adana), by Turks interrupted his work and on 20 June 1812 he received a near-fatal bullet wound in the hip.

Beaufort sailed her back to England as a convoy escort.

The ship shared in the proceeds from Badger's detention in September 1812 of the American droit Sally – Britain being at war with the US at the time. (Note: A first-class share of the prize money was worth £13 15s 7d; a sixth-class share, that of an ordinary seaman, was worth 4s 9 3/4d.) Lloyd's List (LL) reported that Sally, a prize to Frederickstein, had arrived at Gibraltar on 18 September.

== Fate ==
Fredericksteen was paid off in November 1812. (Note: After paying her off, Beaufort stayed onshore and drew up his charts. In 1817 he published his book Karamania; or a brief description of the South Coast of Asia Minor, and of the Remains of Antiquity.) She was offered for sale, lying at Woolwich, in April 1813, and was sold in June the same year.
