= HMS Acheron (1803) =

Ship launched at Whitby in 1799

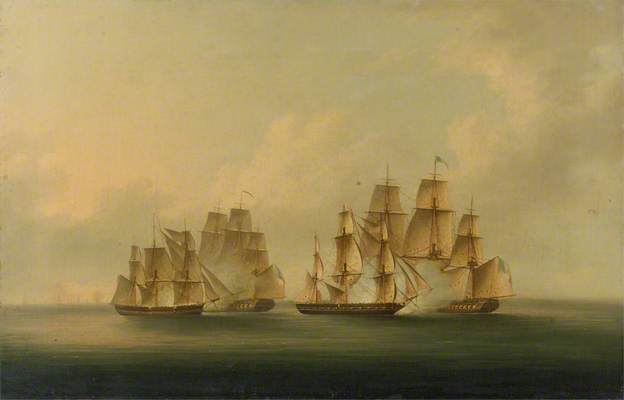
- Action of HMS Arrow and Acheron against the French frigates Hortense and Incorruptible: Beginning of the action, 4 February 1805, by Francis Sartorious Jr., National Maritime Museum, Greenwich. Left to right: Acheron, Hortense, Arrow, and Incorruptible

History

Kingdom of Great Britain
- Name: New Grove
- Owner: Various
- Builder: Whitby
- Launched: 1799
- Fate: Sold 1803

United Kingdom
- Name: HMS Acheron
- Namesake: Acheron
- Acquired: 1803 by purchase
- Honours and awards: Naval General Service Medal with clasp "Acheron 3 Feby. 1805"
- Fate: Captured and burned 4 February 1805

General characteristics
- Tons burthen: 388 (bm)
- Length: 108 ft 3 in (33.0 m) (overall); 85 ft 9 in (26.1 m) (keel)
- Beam: 29 ft 2 in (8.9 m)
- Depth of hold: 12 ft 9 in (3.9 m)
- Complement: 67
- Armament: 8 × 24-pounder carronades + 1 × 10" + 1 × 13" mortar

HMS Acheron was the mercantile New Grove, launched at Whitby in 1799, that the Admiralty purchased in 1803 and fitted as a bomb-vessel. She served in the Mediterranean for about a year. On 3 February 1805 she and Arrow were escorting a convoy from Malta to England when they encountered two French frigates. Arrow and Acheron were able to save the majority of the vessels of the convoy by their resistance before they were compelled to strike. Arrow sank almost immediately after surrendering, and Acheron was so badly damaged that the French burnt her. However, the British vessels' self- sacrifice enabled almost all the vessels of the convoy to escape.

== Mercantile career ==
New Grove first appears in Lloyd's Register in 1800, with owner T. Brown and T. Lacey, master. She was in the London – Jamaica trade. During the year she received a new master, J. Barclay, and Suriname as her destination. Thereafter she remained under Barclay's command, and in the Jamaica trade until Brown sold her to the Admiralty in October 1803.

== HMS Acheron ==
The Admiralty named their purchase HMS Acheron and had her fitted out as a bomb vessel between 28 October and 2 March 1804, at Woolwich Dockyard. Commander Arthur Farquhar commissioned her in December 1803 for the Mediterranean.

In July Acheron was part of the British squadron blockading the port, bottling up the French fleet. Between 2 and 5 August, bad weather drove the British off station. Admiral de Latouche Tréville took the opportunity to sortie from Toulon to give his crews an opportunity to train. However, he did not try to sail to Boulogne, as Napoleon desired. In fairness, de Latouche Tréville was ill and died on 10 August.

On 23 November Achiron [sic] captured the Adamo. Acheron also shared in the proceeds of the capture by Nelson's fleet of Maria Magdalena, St. Judas Tadeo, Victoria, Agatha, and Corvo on 15, 17, and 21 November, and 8 December.

Captain Richard Budd Vincent, of Arrow, arrived in Malta on 20 December from Naples. At Malta, he received instructions to take the merchant vessels gathered there to England, once some merchantmen arrived from Smyrna to join the convoy. The orders further specified that he was to take Acheron with him to assist him in protecting the trade. Arrow was returning to England as she was badly in need of repairs that could only be performed there. The vessels from Smyrna arrived on 2 January 1805, and the convoy left for England on 4 January.

The vessels from Smyrna arrived on 2 January 1805, and the convoy left for England on 4 January. The brig Jalouse had escorted the convoy from Smyrna and she continued on as an escort as far as western Sicily.

The convoy numbered some 25–30 vessels. A later account gives the vessels as the transport Dutchess of Rutland and 29 British merchant vessels. (Note: Dutchess of Rutland, of 440 tons (bm), was armed with six 3-pounder guns.)

Between 19 and 22 January, bad weather off the coast of Spain caused the convoy to separate into two parts, one with Arrow and the other with Acheron. During the night of 29 January the brig Union apparently foundered with all hands during a squall.

On 2 February, the convoy fell in with the Spanish ship Gravina, which Amazon had captured on 27 January. Gravina was on her way to Malta but Captain Hyde Parker of Amazon had instructed the commander of the prize crew to sail to England should he encounter a convoy sailing there. Gravina therefore joined the convoy.

== Fate ==
The French frigate Hortense and the French frigate Incorruptible were cruising off the coast of Algeria when on 1 February 1805, they engaged a convoy, destroying seven ships. Two days later, they encountered another convoy.

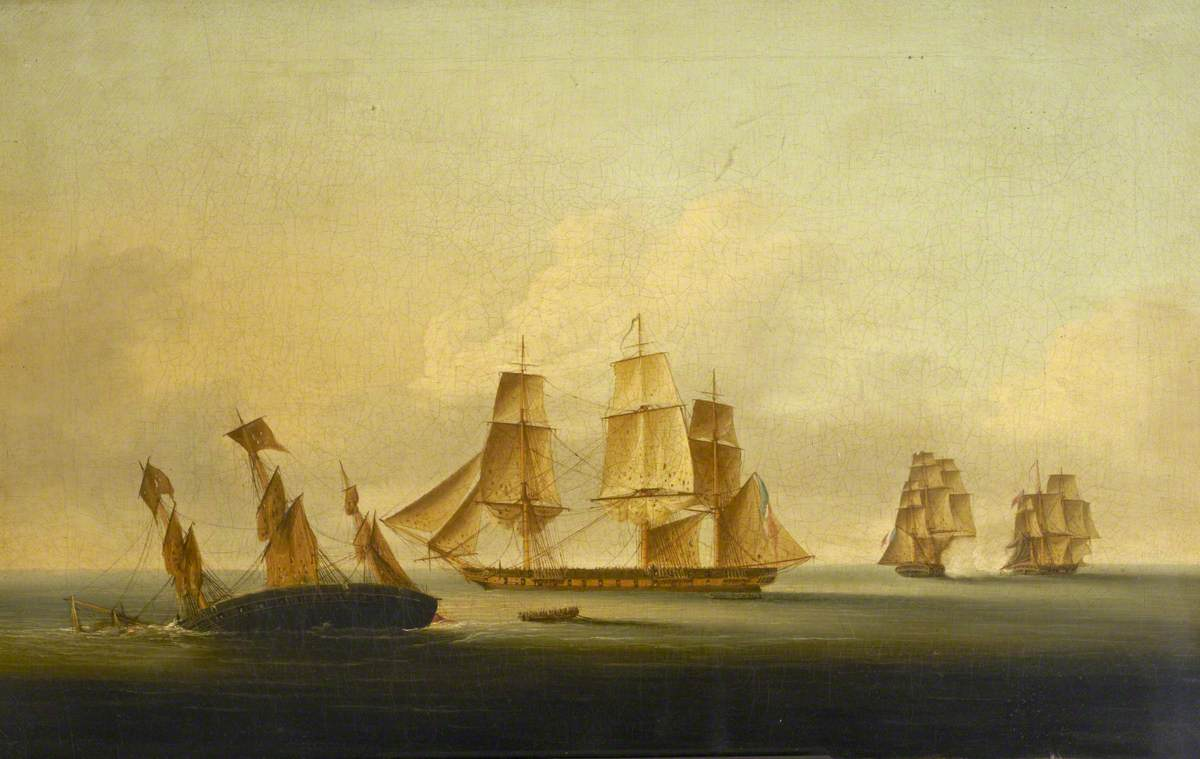
End of the action between HMS Arrow and Acheron and the French frigates Hortense and Incorruptible, Francis Sartorious, Jr., National Maritime Museum, Greenwich

This second convoy was the convoy that Arrow and Acheron were escorting. Early on the morning of 3 February the British were off Cape Caxine when they sighted the two French vessels, which the British initially thought they might be members of the convoy rejoining. When it became clear that the strange vessels were French frigates, Arrow threw off the tow to the brig Adventure, which had been leaking and which the British destroyed to prevent her falling into enemy hands. Arrow and Acheron then placed themselves between the convoy and the pursuing French. Vincent signaled the vessels of the convoy to make for a per-designated rendezvous point. The French frigates did not catch up to the Royal Navy vessels until the morning of 4 February. Initially, Hortense engaged Acheron, and Arrow fired a broadside into Hortense as well. About two hours later, Incorruptible joined the action. Vincent signaled to Duchess of Rutland, the most capable, though minimally so, of the merchant vessels, to join the action, a signal Duchess of Rutland ignored. Throughout the action the Royal Navy vessels were at a disadvantage. Not only did the French frigates have more cannons and men, but the French cannons were guns, whereas the British cannons were almost all carronades. The French could therefore stand off and fire their guns while out of the effective range of the carronades. Also, the French were carrying a large number of troops who harassed the British with small arms fire whenever the vessels closed. After about an hour Vincent had to strike. Arrow's hold was filling with water and four of her cannons were dismounted. She also had heavy casualties. All of Arrow's boats had been destroyed, but boats from Incorruptible took off the survivors, and rescue those men from Arrow that jumped into the water as Arrow turned on her beam ends and sank.

In the battle, of the 132 men on board, Arrow lost 13 men killed and 27 wounded, at least two of whom died later. The number included passengers, some 17 of whom were being invalided home. A lady, her infant, and her ladies' maid were also taking passage on board.

Acheron fought on for another quarter of an hour before she too struck. She had lost three or four men killed and eight wounded. She had a complement of 67 men, and at least two passengers, a lieutenant of marines and his servant, both of whom were killed. She was so damaged that the French burnt her. Hortense had 10 men killed out of her crew of 300 men and the 350 artillerymen she was carrying.

The French frigates also captured three ships of the convoy; the rest of the convoy escaped. One of the vessels the French captured was Dutchess of Rutland, whose master failed to destroy her convoy signals and instructions; fortunately the French had to return to port to effect repairs and did not take advantage of the opportunity this represented. The French scuttled the three merchant vessels they had captured.

After the loss of their escorts, some of the surviving vessels of the convoy fell prey to privateers. Fuerte, of Cadiz, captured Alert, Langley, master, Castle, Anderson, master, a ship, and a brig, and sent them into Malaga. Reportedly, Fuerte had captured a fifth vessel that she sent into Algeciras. One of the vessels Fuerte sent into Malaga was later identified as Hannah, which was one of several ships of the convoy that had turned to sail back to Malta.

It later turned out that British frigate Fisgard and the sloop Wasp had been at Cape Pallas (37°35′N 0°43′W), a few leagues from the action. However, they were unaware of it and so did not come to the convoy's assistance.

Hortense took Farquhar and his men into Malaga, from where they were exchanged relatively quickly. The court martial of Farquhar, his officers, and men, for the loss of their vessel took place on Royal Sovereign in Palma Bay, Sardinia. (Note: This appears to be Porto Palma, Caprera, in the Maddalena archipelago. Nelson and his fleet were anchored there. (Some accounts mistake Palma Bay for Palma, Mallorca.)) Farquhar, his officers, and men, were honourably acquitted. Farquhar then received a promotion to post captain for his bravery.

The French held Vincent and his crew as prisoners in Cartagena, Spain, for almost three months from 8 February until early May. Vincent had managed to keep his Turkish sabre when he left Arrow, but a French officer confiscated it and the French refused to return it. Eventually, Admiral Lord Nelson was able to arrange a cartel brig to return the British prisoners to Gibraltar. From there they left for England on 28 May on the storeship Camel, arriving at Saint Helen's on 4 June.

The court martial of Vincent and his crew for the loss of Arrow convened on 17 June aboard Gladiator at Portsmouth. The court martial honourably acquitted all; Vincent received promotion to post captain immediately thereafter.

Lloyd's Patriotic Fund awarded both Vincent and Farquhar honour swords, each worth £100. In addition, the Fund awarded Vincent a piece of plate of the same value. Furthermore, the Fund paid out £545 to the wounded and the families of those who had died. At the request of Lloyd's, the Chairman of the association of Merchants Trading to South of Europe provided Vincent with the sum of £477 10s, and a proportionate amount to Farquhar, for them to procure clothing and necessities for their officers and crew, who had lost everything when they were captured and their vessels were destroyed. Vincent received £50, and each seaman received £2 10s.

On 19 September 1808, the merchants of Malta awarded Farquhar with a piece of plate and a complementary letter. The merchants also presented Vincent with a piece of plate.

In 1847 the Admiralty awarded the Naval General Service Medal with clasp "Arrow 3 Feby. 1805" to the eight surviving claimants from Arrow, and the clasp "Acheron 3 Feby. 1805" to the one surviving claimant from Acheron.
