= HMS Arrow (1796) =

British naval sloop 1796–1805

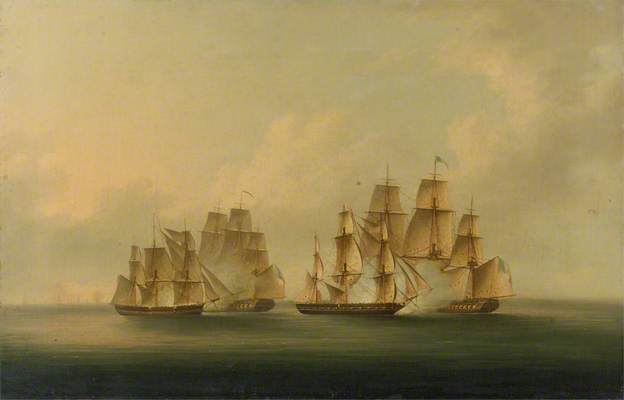
- Action of HMS Arrow and Acheron against the French frigates Hortense and Incorruptible: Beginning of the action, 4 February 1805, by Francis Sartorious Jr., National Maritime Museum, Greenwich. Left to right: Acheron, Hortense, Arrow, and Incorruptible

History

Great Britain
- Name: HMS Arrow
- Builder: Hobbs & Hellyer at Redbridge
- Commissioned: 1796
- Decommissioned: 1805
- Honors and awards: Naval General Service Medal with clasps; "Arrow 13 Sept 1799"; "Copenhagen"; "Arrow 3 Feby. 1805"
- Captured: 4 February 1805
- Fate: Burned 4 February 1805

General characteristics
- Tons burthen: 38616/94 (bm)
- Length: 128 ft 8 in (39.2 m) (overall); 80 ft 8 in (24.6 m) (keel)
- Beam: 30 ft (9.1 m)
- Depth of hold: 7 ft 11 in (2.4 m)
- Sail plan: Sloop
- Complement: 121 (later 140)
- Armament: Initially: Upper deck (UD): 24 × 32-pounder carronades; QD: 2 × 32-pounder carronades with two more being added later; Fc: 2 × 32-pounder carronades; Later: UD: 18 × 32-pounder carronades; QD: nil; Fc: 2 × 6-pounder chase guns; Note: All the carronades were experimental 24 cwt carronades

HMS Arrow was a sloop-of-war in the Royal Navy that the Admiralty purchased in 1796. during the French Revolutionary Wars she participated in many actions, including one that resulted in her crew qualifying for the Naval General Service Medal. On 3 February 1805 she and Acheron were escorting a convoy from Malta to England when they encountered two French frigates. Arrow and Acheron were able to save the majority of the vessels of the convoy by their resistance before they were compelled to strike. Arrow sank almost immediately after surrendering, and Acheron was so badly damaged that the French burnt her.

== Design ==
Arrow and her sister ship Dart were "Two experimental vessels designed by Samuel Bentham, Esq., at that time inspector-general of his majesty's naval works. They were in shape much sharper than vessels of war in general, and projected or raked forward, at each end like a wherry. Their breadth increased from the water-line upwards; whereby it was considered that they would be stiffer, and less liable to overset than ordinary vessels. The decks were straight fore and aft, and the frames or ribs of less curvature than usual. They were constructed to carry twenty-four 32-pounder carronades upon the main deck, and were afterwards fitted to receive two more carronades of the same nature on each of their two short decks, which we may call the quarterdeck and forecastle. All these carronades were fitted upon the non-recoil principle. It is believed that both the Arrow and Dart subsequently took on board, for their quarterdecks, two additional 32s. They proved to be stiff vessels and swift sailers, but it was found necessary to add some dead wood to their bottoms, in order to make them stay better. Not knowing exactly what characteristic designation to give the Arrow and Dart, we have merely named them: they must be considered, especially when their force is compared with that of the two or three classes next above them, as extraordinary vessels for sloops of war, but as such only they ranked."

== French Revolutionary Wars ==
Commander Nathaniel Portlock commissioned Arrow in 1796. On 1 June 1797 Arrow captured two French merchant vessels, Jeune Albe and Sept Freres. Then on 25 April 1798 Arrow captured Jonge Ferdinand. Then on 1 September Arrow captured Jong Jan Swart.

Between April and July 1799 Arrow sailed in company with Wolverine and the hired armed cutter Kent. Together, these three vessels captured a number of prizes. On 23 April they captured Blenie Rosetta. On 21 May they captured Rosalia. Eight days later, on 29 May, they took Active and Providence. One month after that, on 28 June, they captured five fishing boats. Then on 13 July they captured Altona. Three days later they captured Antony Wilhelm. Lastly, on 29 July, they captured the Nancy. (Note: On 20 January 1803 prize money resulting from the capture of Blenie Rosetta, Active, Providence, five fishing boats, Altona, Antony Wilhelm and Nancy was due for payment.) Arrow also captured the hoy Johanna on 1 May.

Next, Arrow was among the many British vessels that shared in the capture, on 28 August, of the Dutch hulks Drotchterland and Brooderschap, and the ships Helder, Venus, Minerva, and Hector, in the New Diep. (Note: The prize money for a seaman was 6s 8d.) She also shared in the surrender, on 30 August, in the surrender of the Dutch Fleet at the Vlieter Incident.

On 9 September Vice-Admiral Mitchell detached Arrow and Wolverine to attack a ship and a brig belonging to the Batavian Republic and anchored under the Vlie at the entrance to the Texel. Arrow had to lighten ship and the following day they crossed over the Flack abreast of Wieringen and saw the enemy in the passage leading from Vlie Island towards Harlingen. On 12 September Wolverine, commanded by William Bolton, anchored within 60 yards of the brig and only had to fire one gun before the brig hauled down her colours. She proved to be Gier, armed with fourteen 12-pounders. Next, Arrow exchanged broadsides with the ship Draak, of 24 guns (six 50-pound brass howitzers, two 32-pounder guns, and sixteen long 18-pounder guns), which surrendered when Wolverine came up. Draak turned out to be a sheer hulk, so Bolton burnt her. The British also captured two schooners, each of four 8-pounder guns, and four schuyts, each of two 8-pounder guns. The Dutch prisoners numbered 380 men. In 1847 the Admiralty awarded the Naval General Service Medal with clasps "Arrow 13 Sept 1799" and "Wolverine 13 Sept. 1799" to any survivors of the two crews that claimed them.

Arrow and Wolverine weighed on 15 September and near Vlie Wolverine went to take possession of a Batavian ship, the 24-gun Dolphin (Dolfijn), which hoisted Orange colours as soon as the English came up. Two hundred and thirty prisoners were put aboard her and the command given to Lieutenant M'Dougall of Wolverine. Command of the Gier, a brand new vessel, went to Lieutenant Gilmour, first lieutenant of Arrow. Gilmour would receive promotion to the rank of commander for his part in the action.

Arrow was also involved in the wreck and attempted salvage of HMS Lutine, which sank on 9 October 1799 carrying a large cargo of gold.

In November 1799 William Bolton replaced Portlock in command of Arrow, Portlock having received promotion to post captain on 28 September 1799.

On 25 July 1800 Nemesis was part of a squadron that also included Terpsichore, Prevoyante, Arrow, and the hired armed lugger Nile. The squadron encountered the Danish frigate HDMS Freja, which was escorting a convoy of two ships, two brigs and two galliots. Captain Baker of Nemesis hailed Freja and said that he would send a boat to board the convoy. The Danish captain refused, and said that if a boat approached he would fire on it. Baker sent a midshipman and four men in a boat, and the Danes fired several shots, which missed the boat, but one of which killed a man on Nemesis. Nemesis then opened fire with her broadside. After an engagement of about 25 minutes, Freja, much damaged, struck. She had suffered eight men killed and many wounded; both Nemesis and Arrow each suffered two men killed and several wounded.

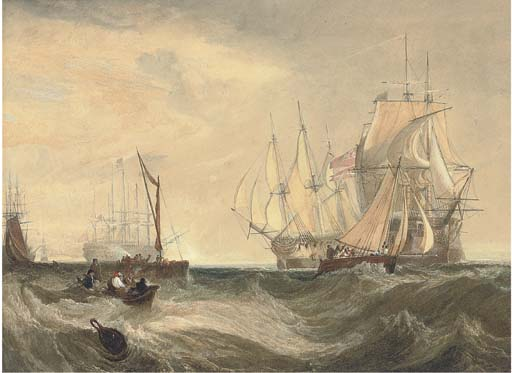
H.M. Ships Nemesis and Arrow bringing the Danish frigate Freja and her convoy into the Downs in July 1800. Clarkson Stanfield

The British brought Freya and her convoy into the Downs on 6 March. They later released her, and presumably the rest of the convoy. (Note: In 1807, after the second battle of Copenhagen, the British again captured Freja. This time they took her into the Royal Navy as HMS Freya.) This incident led to strained relations with Denmark, and, in order to anticipate any hostile move from Copenhagen, the British government despatched Earl Whitworth in August on a special mission to Copenhagen. The Danes not being ready for war, his mission staved off hostilities for about a year.

On 20 September Arrow captured Oster Risoer.

In 1801 Arrow came under the command of Commander Thomas-Charles Brodie. In February Arrow recaptured Betsey, of Montrose, which had been sailing from Riga to Shoreham when a French privateer had captured her.

Brodie was Arrow's captain at the Battle of Copenhagen. Arrow suffered no casualties, though her sister ship Dart had two men killed and one wounded. After the battle Arrow took the dispatches back to England.

In 1802 Commander Richard Budd Vincent replace Brodie. He had received his promotion to commander on 29 April and his appointment to command Arrow on 17 May. He proceeded to sail her off the Devonshire coast on anti-smuggler patrol. On 7 September Arrow seized 174 kegs of spirits and wine.

== Napoleonic Wars ==
Arrow's design made her too recognizable at a distance so in February 1803 Vincent paid her off. On 1 March he was reappointed to her. However, he faced great difficulty in assembling a crew. He had to resort to sending one of his officers in a Customs House cutter into the Channel to impress seamen from vessels sailing there. He had no sooner succeeded in assembling a crew than the Lords of the Admiralty drafted the majority of the men Vincent had gathered and put them into a troopship sailing for the West Indies.

On 1 May Vincent recommissioned Arrow for the Mediterranean. In mid-June, Arrow recaptured the lugger Louisa, which had been carrying spirits when a French privateer had captured her. Arrow sent Louisa into Portsmouth.

In July Vincent sailed Arrow for the Mediterranean. When he left she had only about two-thirds of her official complement. Once in the Mediterranean, Arrow performed convoy duty in the Adriatic and the Aegean Archipelago. Arrow called in at Gibraltar, Malta, Sicily, Naples, Sardinia, Turkey, Corfu, Zante and the neighboring isles, Venice, Trieste, Fiume, and Smyrna, as well as many smaller places.

In March 1804 Arrow was in the Dardanelles, convoying some vessels to Constantinople, when a fort on the European side fired on her. The wind was blowing too hard for Arrow to be able to stop and remonstrate with the fort's commander, but when she reached Constantinople Vincent complained to the British Minister, Alexander Stratton. (Note: Marshall names Alexander Stratton as the Minister Plenipotentiary to the Ottoman court. However, Wikipedia's list of diplomats of the United Kingdom to the Ottoman Empire has Stratton serving only between January and May 1803. The British ambassador in March 1804 would have been William Drummond of Logiealmond.) He in turn complained to the Divan, who then fined the governor of the fort.

While Arrow was in Constantinople, Vincent visited the "Capitan Pacha" (Kapudan Pasha), the commander of the Ottoman fleet, and toured the Imperial Arsenal and Ottoman vessels. The Kapudan Pasha presented Vincent with an elegant sabre. When the Kapudan Pasha and some of his officers toured Arrow Vincent reciprocated by presenting the Kapudan Pasha with a brace of pistols whose workmanship the Kapudan Pasha had admired.

On 3 June, Vincent sent in his boats under the command of Lieutenant Cuthbert Featherstone Daly to cut out the French privateer Actif from under the cliffs at Fano island, at the entrance to the Adriatic and belonging to the then neutral self-governing federation of the Septinsular Republic (Heptanesos or Seven Islands). Actif was a tartane of four guns, rowing 24 oars, and having a crew of 74 men. She was new but had had some success. The British were unable to get her out and after she grounded they set her on fire, destroying her. In the action, Arrow had two men killed and a number wounded, one mortally. This action led Lord Nelson to write a letter to Vincent, dated 28 July, on HMS Victory at sea. Nelson informed Vincent that he supported Vincent's decision to attack Actif, and that he, Nelson, would advise the British minister at Corfu to draw the attention of the authorities that if enemy vessels took advantage of Corfu's neutrality to fire on British warships from Corfiote ports, the British would be justified in destroying the French privateers. At the same time, Nelson wanted Vincent to understand clearly that British vessels were not to fire on enemy vessels in neutral ports unless the enemy vessels forfeited the protection of the port by firing first.

By late August it was clear that the Malta Yard could not repair the many defects in Arrow that had accumulated, particularly with respect to her water tanks, which were integral to her hull. Nelson, therefore, decided that she should sail back to Britain as escort to a convoy in autumn. By 10 October, Arrow was back in Malta undergoing some repairs.

Still, on 18 October Arrow was off Cape Spartivento when a bolt of lightning hit her main mast. Although main top-mast went overboard, the sails, being furled and wet, did not catch fire. There were no casualties and no further damage. (Note: Cape Spartivento was the one in Calabria, not the one at the southern tip of Sardinia, near Cagliari.) The next day Arrow returned to Malta where she replaced her mast.

Arrow proceeded to Palermo and Gergenti, where she gathered a convoy that she escorted to Malta, arriving on 17 November. Next, Arrow was dispatched on a secret mission to Messina, Palermo, and Naples. She left Naples on 12 December and arrived at Malta on 20 December.

At Malta, Vincent received instructions to take the merchant vessels gathered there to England, once some merchantmen arrived from Smyrna to join the convoy. The orders further specified that he was to take the 8-gun bomb vessel Acheron, under the command of Commander Arthur Farquhar, with him to assist him in protecting the trade. The vessels from Smyrna arrived on 2 January 1805, and the convoy left for England on 4 January. The brig Jalouse had escorted the convoy from Smyrna and she continued on as an escort as far as western Sicily.

The convoy numbered some 25-30 vessels. A later account gives the vessels as the transport Dutchess of Rutland and 29 British merchant vessels. (Note: Duchess of Rutland, of 440 tons (bm), was armed with six 3-pounder guns.)

Between 19 and 22 January, bad weather off the coast of Spain caused the convoy to separate into two parts, one with Arrow and the other with Acheron. During the night of 29 January the brig Union apparently foundered with all hands during a squall.

On 2 February, the convoy fell in with the Spanish ship Gravina, which Amazon had captured on 27 January. Gravina was on her way to Malta but Captain Hyde Parker of Amazon had instructed the commander of the prize crew to sail to England should he encounter a convoy sailing there. Gravina therefore joined the convoy.

== Fate ==
The French frigates Hortense and Incorruptible were cruising off the coast of Algeria when on 1 February, they engaged a convoy, destroying seven ships. Two days later, they encountered another convoy.

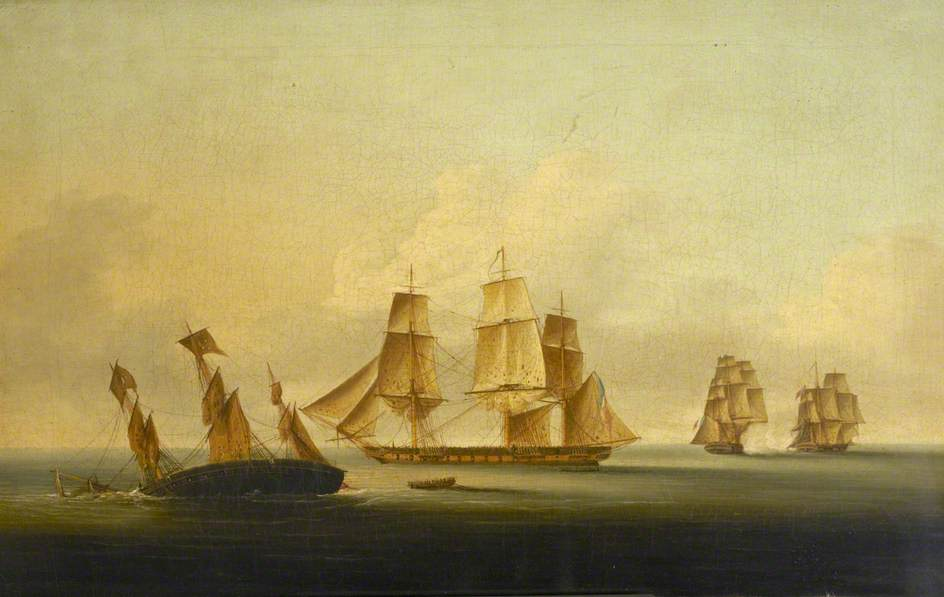
End of the action between HMS Arrow and Acheron and the French frigates Hortense and Incorruptible, Francis Sartorious Jr., National Maritime Museum, Greenwich

This second convoy was the convoy that Arrow and Acheron were escorting. Early on the morning of 3 February the British were off Cape Caxine when they sighted the two French vessels, which the British initially thought might be members of the convoy rejoining. When it became clear that the strange vessels were French frigates, Arrow threw off the tow to the brig Adventure, (which had been leaking and which the British destroyed to prevent her falling into enemy hands). Arrow and Acheron then placed themselves between the convoy and the pursuing French. Vincent signaled the vessels of the convoy to make for a pre-designated rendezvous point. The French frigates did not catch up to the Royal Navy vessels until the morning of 4 February. Initially, Hortense engaged Acheron, and Arrow fired a broadside into Hortense as well. About two hours later, Incorruptible joined the action. Vincent signaled to Duchess of Rutland, the most capable, though minimally so, of the merchant vessels, to join the action, a signal Duchess of Rutland ignored. Throughout the action the Royal Navy vessels were at a disadvantage. Not only did the French frigates have more cannons and men, but the French cannons were guns, whereas the British cannons were almost all carronades. The French could therefore stand off and fire their guns while out of the effective range of the carronades. Also, the French were carrying a large number of troops who harassed the British with small arms fire whenever the vessels closed.

After about an hour Vincent had to strike. Arrow's hold was filling with water and four of her cannons were dismounted. She also had heavy casualties. All of Arrow's boats had been destroyed, but boats from Incorruptible took off the survivors, and rescue those men from Arrow that jumped into the water as Arrow turned on her beam ends and sank.

In the battle Arrow lost 13 men killed and 27 wounded, at least two of whom died later, of the 132 men on board. The number included passengers, some 17 of whom were being invalided home. A lady, her infant, and her ladies' maid were also taking passage on board.

Acheron fought on for another quarter of an hour before she too struck. She had lost three or four men killed and eight wounded. She had complement of 67 men, and at least two passengers, a lieutenant of marines and his servant, both of whom were killed. She was so damaged that the French burnt her. Hortense had 10 men killed out of her crew of 300 men and the 350 artillerymen she was carrying.

The French frigates also captured three ships of the convoy; the rest of the convoy escaped. One of the vessels the French captured was Dutchess of Rutland, whose master failed to destroy her convoy signals and instructions; fortunately for the British, the French had to return to port to effect repairs and did not take advantage of the opportunity this represented. The French scuttled the three merchant vessels they captured.

After the loss of their escorts, some of the surviving vessels of the convoy fell prey to privateers. Fuerte, of Cadiz, captured Alert, Langley, master, Castle, Anderson, master, a ship, and a brig, and sent them into Malaga. Reportedly, Fuerte had captured a fifth vessel that she sent into Algeciras.

It later turned out that British frigate Fisgard and the sloop Wasp had been at Cape Pallas (37°35′N 0°43′W), a few leagues from the action. However, they were unaware of it and so did not come to the convoy's assistance.

Hortense took Farquhar and his men into Malaga, from where they were exchanged relatively quickly. The court martial of Farquhar, his officers, and men, for the loss of their vessel took place on Royal Sovereign in Palma Bay, Sardinia. (Note: This appears to be Porto Palma, Caprera, in the Maddalena archipelago. Nelson and his fleet were anchored there. Some accounts mistake Palma Bay for Palma, Mallorca.) Farquhar, his officers, and men, were honourably acquitted. Farquahar then received a promotion to post captain for his bravery.

The French held Vincent and his crew as prisoners in Cartagena, Spain, for almost three months from 8 February until early May. Vincent had managed to keep his Turkish sabre when he left Arrow, but a French officer confiscated it and the French refused to return it. Eventually, Admiral Lord Nelson was able to arrange a cartel brig to return the British prisoners to Gibraltar. From there they left for England on 28 May on the storeship Camel, arriving at Saint Helen's on 4 June.

The court martial of Vincent and his crew for the loss of Arrow convened on 17 June aboard Gladiator at Portsmouth. The court martial honourably acquitted all; Vincent received promotion to post captain immediately thereafter.

Lloyd's Patriotic Fund awarded both Vincent and Farquahar honour swords, each worth £100. In addition, the Fund awarded Vincent a piece of plate of the same value.> Furthermore, the Fund paid out £545 to the wounded and the families of those who had died. At the request of Lloyd's, the chairman of the association of Merchants Trading to South of Europe provided Vincent with the sum of £477 10s, and a proportionate amount to Farquhar, for them to procure clothing and necessities for their officers and crew, who had lost everything when they were captured and their vessels were destroyed. Vincent received £50, and each seaman received £2 10s.

On 19 September 1808, the merchants of Malta awarded Farquhar with a piece of plate and a complementary letter. The merchants also presented Vincent with a piece of plate.

In 1847 the Admiralty awarded the Naval General Service Medal with clasp "Arrow 3 Feby. 1805" to the eight surviving claimants from Arrow, and the clasp "Acheron 3 Feby. 1805" to the one surviving claimant from Acheron.
