= Richard Budd Vincent =

English Royal Navy captain

Captain Richard Budd Vincent
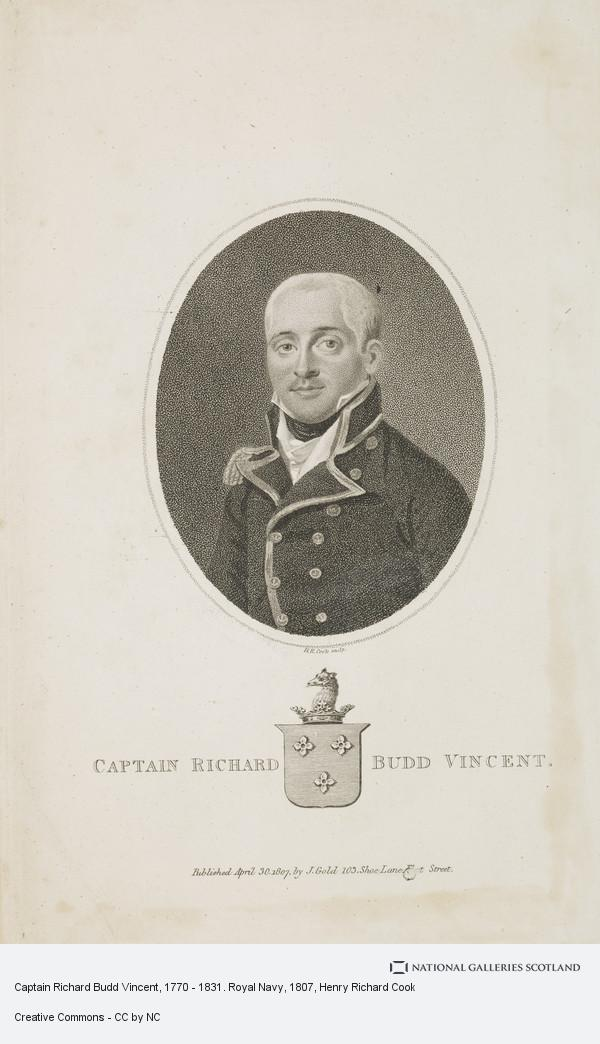
- Born: 1770? Newbury, Berkshire
- Died: 18 August 1831
- Occupation: Royal Navy captain

Richard Budd Vincent (1770? – 18 August 1831) was an English Royal Navy captain.

== Biography ==
Vincent was born about 1770 at Newbury, Berkshire, where his father Osman Vincent was a banker. John Painter Vincent was his brother. Richard entered the navy in 1781 on board the Britannia, the flagship of Vice-admiral Samuel Barrington, and was present at the relief of Gibraltar and the rencounter with the allied fleet off Cape Spartel in October 1782. He was, after the peace, for three years in the Salisbury on the Newfoundland station, served for four years in the Channel, and on 3 November 1790 was promoted to be lieutenant. In 1793 he went out to the Mediterranean in the Terrible, was present in the operations at Toulon, and in 1794 on the coast of Corsica. In October 1794 he was moved into the Victory, Lord Hood's flagship, then understood to be certain promotion. But in April 1795 Hood was summarily ordered to strike his flag, and Vincent's chance was gone. It did not come again till 29 April 1802, when, after seven years' continuous service, mostly in the North Sea, he was promoted to be commander, and three weeks later was appointed to the Arrow, one of a class of sloops built and armed on a plan proposed by [Sir] Samuel Bentham. She carried, in fact, twenty-eight 32-pounder carronades, an armament heavier, so far as the mere weight of shot was concerned, than that of any frigate then afloat, but, of course, effective at only a very short range. After nearly a year's preventive service in the Channel, she was paid off on 28 February 1803, and recommissioned the next day, again by Vincent, for the Mediterranean, where for the next two years she was mostly engaged in convoying the trade up the Adriatic and Archipelago.

By the end of 1804 she was in need of a thorough repair; many of her timbers were rotten, and a survey at Malta decided that she was too weak to heave down; she must go home to be docked. She was accordingly ordered, with the Acheron bomb in company, to take charge of the homeward-bound trade. They sailed from Malta towards the end of January, and on 3 February were seen and chased between Algiers and Cape Tenez by two French frigates of thirty-eight and forty guns, the Incorruptible and Hortense, the only two ships of Villeneuve's squadron which had continued at sea when the squadron itself was driven back by bad weather on 21 January. Between these and the convoy Vincent interposed the Arrow and the Acheron, hoping that he might at least be able to give the merchant ships time to escape. About half-past seven on the morning of the 4th the French frigates brought them to action, and captured both after a brilliant defence of nearly two hours. The Arrow sank almost immediately afterwards, before all her men could be removed; the Acheron was set on fire and destroyed. The merchant ships had meanwhile got away to the westward, and only three of them were captured. Officers and men were taken to Cartagena, whence in May they were sent in a cartel to Gibraltar. They arrived in England early in June. The court-martial on Vincent, held on 17 June, not only ‘most honourably acquitted’ him, but pronounced his conduct ‘highly meritorious and praiseworthy.’

Two days after the trial Vincent was advanced to post rank by a commission dated 8 April, and on 3 July the committee of the Patriotic Fund awarded him a sword of the value of 100l., and also a piece of plate of the same value. Four years later the merchants of Malta presented him with a handsome service of plate. In May 1806 Vincent was appointed to the Brilliant on the Cork station, but in October he was obliged by ill-health to resign the command, nor was he able to accept any further employment till March 1808, when he was appointed to the Cambrian in the Mediterranean. From her he moved into the Hind; but in September 1808, being at Malta, he complied with the request of Sir Alexander John Ball to assist him in the duties of the port as captain of the Trident. With Ball and his successors, he remained in the Trident till December 1815, when he was appointed to the Aquilon, in which he returned to England in April 1816. He was nominated a C.B. in June 1815. He had no further service and died on 18 August 1831.
