= Robert Lambert (Royal Navy officer) =

Royal Navy admiral (1771–1836)

Vice-Admiral Robert Lambert
- Born: 2 April 1771
- Died: 16 September 1836 (aged 65); Weston Green, Surrey
- Military career
- Allegiance: United Kingdom
- Branch: Royal Navy
- Rank: Vice-Admiral
- Commands: HMS Duncan; Cape of Good Hope Station
- Conflicts: Napoleonic Wars

Vice-Admiral Robert Stuart Lambert (2 April 1771 – 16 September 1836) was a Royal Navy officer who became commander-in-chief of the Cape of Good Hope Station.

== Naval career ==
Lambert joined the Royal Navy in circa 1790 and, having been promoted to captain he was given command of the third-rate HMS Duncan in 1812. He became commander-in-chief of the Cape of Good Hope Station in 1820. His responsibilities included command of the British garrison on Saint Helena where Napoleon died in May 1821.

Military offices
Preceded by Robert Plampin	Commander-in-Chief, Cape of Good Hope Station; 1820–1821	Succeeded by James Lillicrap
