= Peter Hore (historian) =

Peter G Hore FRHistS (born 1944) naval officer, historian and obituarist, served a full career in the Royal Navy (1962-2000), spent ten years working in the cinema and television industry (2000-2009) and is a successful biographer and obituarist. One of his books, Habit of Victory, was the Daily Telegraph reader's choice and another book, Sydney, Cipher and Search was praised for its literary quality and depth of research and shortlisted for the Mountbatten Media Awards. His reasons for becoming an historian are published at British Naval History.

== Naval career ==
Captain Peter Hore served worldwide as a logistics specialist in the British Royal Navy, including exchange service in the United States Navy (1964), and two tours of duty in NATO's Standing Naval Force Atlantic (1972-3).

During his Navy service he qualified as an interpreter in Spanish in 1968, interpreter in Swedish in 1970 and linguist in Cantonese in 1986. During the 1982 Falklands War he was the Joint Logistics Commander on Ascension Island, and he has since had the unusual distinction of both having helped to direct the Royal Navy's applied research programme (1992-4) and having headed its non-technical research programme (1997-2000). From 1997-2000 he was Head of Defence Studies during the British government's Strategic Defence Review.

== Public Appointments ==
He is a former Vice President of the Royal Navy Museum and was chairman of its Curatorial Working Party (now the National Museum of the Royal Navy). He has been a trustee of The Naval Review, a member of the council of the Navy Records Society, a member of the board of the Society for Nautical Research and chairman of its Research, Technical and Programmes Committee.

In 2011 he was elected a fellow of the Royal Historical Society, and was elected a corresponding member of the Royal Swedish Society of Naval Sciences.

He is also a Chartered Member of the Chartered Institute of Linguists.

== Cinema and Television ==
In 2000-09 he was Chief Executive of the Cinema and Television Benevolent Fund, a multi-million £ casework charity open to everyone behind the camera in British film and television industries. The charity raises funds principally through the Royal Film Performance. He retired as CEO in November 2009.

== Written works ==
Peter Hore is the editor or author of many reviews, articles and books including three biographies, numerous obituaries and several books on naval history and strategy. He is recognized at Historic Naval Fiction as an established author. In 2009 his book Sydney, Cipher and Search, an account of his ten-year search through the archives, interviews with survivors, and the breaking of a German wartime code, solved the mystery of the disappearance in 1941 of the Australian cruiser HMAS Sydney (D48). Sydney, Cipher and Search was awarded the Sir Robert Craven Trophy. a certificate for literary merit from the Maritime Foundation at the Mountbatten Maritime Prize awards, and was nominated for the Anderson Medal award of the Society for Nautical Research. He is associate editor and book review editor of the influential monthly magazine Warships International Fleet Review, was an op-ed writer on defence and international affairs for Newsday in New York, and has written over half a million words in some 600 obituaries for the London Daily Telegraph.

He is a consultant and contributor to the authoritative Oxford Dictionary of National Biography. and some examples of his contributions can be referenced here:

- Dunlop, Samuel Clarke (1922–2008)
- Le Bailly, Sir Louis Edward Stewart Holland (1915–2010)
- Tippet, Sir Anthony Sanders (1928–2006).

Recent books include Dreadnought to Daring: 100 Years of Comment, Controversy and Debate; Nelson’s Band of Brothers: Their Lives and Memorials, containing a selection of rare illustrations and the biographies of all the officers who commanded under Horatio Nelson at his three great battles; and HMS Pickle: The Swiftest Ship in Nelson’s Trafalgar Fleet, a history of HMS Pickle (1800) and her captain at the Battle of Trafalgar, John Richards Lapenotière.

His latest book is Lindell’s List, the life and times of a group of American and British agents who were imprisoned by the Germans in the Second World War and rescued by the Swedish Red Cross from the ‘women’s hell’, a concentration camp at Ravensbrück, concentration camp, north of Berlin.

Peter Hore has contributed more than 1000 obituaries to the Daily Telegraph on Special Forces and members of the First Aid Nursing Yeomanry, and maritime subjects including British and overseas naval officers, men and women, Royal Marines, Merchant Navy officers, yachtsmen, life-boatmen, naval architects and shipping magnates. Each obituary is on average about 1,000 words long, highly factual and based on interviews and archival research. See examples here:

== Books ==
A partial bibliography is on Amazon.

- With Iain Ballantyne, 'Submarine, 1901-2001' (St Leonards-on-Sea: HPC, 2001) ISBN 0953142124 ISBN 9780953142125
- With A. Bentley-Buckle, 'Through Albert's Eyes' (Dunbeath: Whittles, 2013) ISBN 9781849950664 ISBN 1849950660
- (Editor) 'Training or Education: A Naval Dilemma over Three Centuries', in Hudson Papers Vol.1 (Ministry of Defence, 2001)
- With Derek Allen, 'News of Nelson' (Brussels: Seff Editions, 2005) ISBN 2960041178 ISBN 9782960041170
- With Eric Grove, 'Dimensions of Seapower: Strategic Choice in the Modern World' (Hull: University of Hull Press, 1998)
- 'Dreadnought to Daring: 100 Years of Comment, Controversy and Debate in The Naval Review' (London: Seaforth, 2012) ISBN 9781848321489 ISBN 1848321481
- 'Nelson's Band of Brothers: Their Lives and Memorials' (London: Seaforth, 2015) ISBN 184832779X ISBN 9781848327795
- 'Seapower Ashore: 200 Years of Royal Navy Operations on Land' (London: Chatham in association with National Maritime Museum, 2000) ISBN 1861761554 ISBN 9781861761552
- 'The Genesis of Naval Thinking since the End of the Cold War' (London: Maritime Strategic Studies Institute, 1999)
- 'A Myth Too Many', The Trafalgar Chronicle, 22 (2012)
- 'Battleships' (London: Lorenz, 2004) ISBN 0754814076 ISBN 9780754814078
- 'British Submarine Policy from St Vincent to Arthur Wilson', in 100 Years of the Trade, 1st edn (Lancaster: CDISS, 2001)
- 'Every Dog Shall Do His Duty', The Trafalgar Chronicle, 20 (2010)
- 'HMS Pickle: The Swiftest Ship in Nelson's Fleet at Trafalgar' (Stroud: The History Press, 2015) ISBN 9780750964357 ISBN 0750964359
- 'John Richards Lapenotiere, HM Schooner Pickle and Their Fifteen Minutes of Fame', Mariner's Mirror, 91 (2005)
- 'Lord Melville and the Secret Steam Plan', The Mariner's Mirror, 86 (2000), 157-172 http://www.tandfonline.com/doi/abs/10.1080/00253359.2000.10659236
- 'Maritime Aviation: Light and Medium Aircraft Carriers into the Twenty First Century' (Hull: University of Hull Press, 1999) ISBN 085958688X ISBN 9780859586887
- 'Nelson, Nesbit and Nevis', The Kedge Anchor, March (2011)
- 'Patrick Blackett: Sailor, Scientist and Socialist' (London: Cass, 2003) ISBN 0714653179 ISBN 9780714653174
- 'Royal Navy and Royal Marines Operations, 1964 -1996' (London: Maritime Strategic Studies Institute, 1998)
- 'Sydney Cipher and Search: Solving the Last Great Naval Mystery of the Second World War' (Rendlesham: Seafarer Books, 2009) ISBN 9781906266080 ISBN 1906266085
- 'The Fleet Air Arm and British Naval Operations over Norway and Sweden: Part 1 Autumn of 1940', Forum Navale, Stockholm, 2012
- 'The Fleet Air Arm and British Naval Operations Over Norway and Sweden: Part II Operation Paul the Plan of Attack on Iron-Ore Exports From Neutral Sweden', Forum Navale, Stockholm, 2014
- 'Operation Paul – the Fleet Air Arm attack on Luleå in 1940'. http://www.sjohistoriskasamfundet.se/fn_split/fn70_a04.pdf
- 'The Habit of Victory' (London: Sidgwick & Jackson, 2005) ISBN 0283073128 ISBN 9780283073120
- 'The Logistics Miracle of Ascension Island', in The Falklands Conflict 20 Years on. (Cass: London, 2005) ISBN 0415350301
- With Mervyn Wingfield, 'Wingfield At War' (Dunbeath: Whittles Publishing Company, 2012) ISBN 9781849950640 ISBN 1849950644
- 'Lindell's List: Saving British and American Women at Ravensbrück'. Published September 2016. ISBN 9780750966214

== In addition ==
Numerous newspaper and magazine articles, including regular features and op-ed articles for Warships International Fleet Review, the Kedge Anchor and Trafalgar Chronicle. Since 2015 he has been the editor of the Trafalgar Chronicle Peter has also contributed a large number of book reviews for The Naval Review, The Linguist, Mariner's Mirror, and is Series editor for The British Navy at War and Peace.
