= French frigate Incorruptible =

1795 French Romaine-class frigate

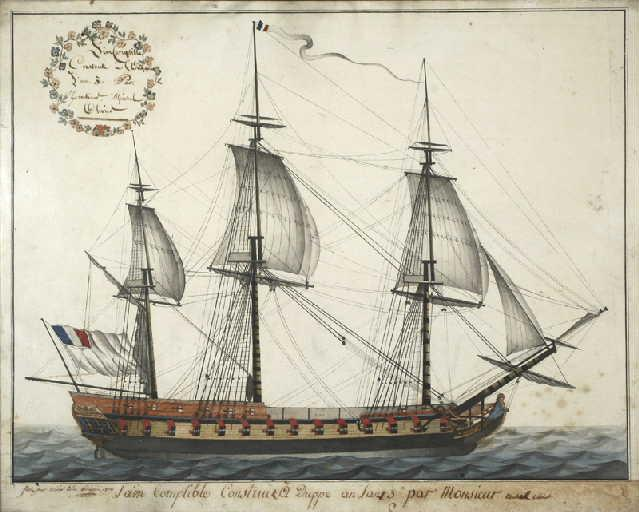
- Portrait of Incorruptible by Olivier Colin.

History

France
- Name: Incorruptible
- Launched: 20 May 1795
- Fate: Broken up after February 1830

General characteristics
- Class & type: Romaine-class frigate
- Displacement: 700 tonnes
- Length: 45.5 m (149 ft)
- Beam: 11.8 m (39 ft)
- Draught: 5 m (16 ft)
- Propulsion: Sail
- Armament: 40 guns: 24 24-pounders; 16 8-pounders

Incorruptible was a 40-gun Romaine-class frigate of the French Navy.

On 15 July 1796, under captain Bescond, she fought against the 56-gun HMS Glatton.

In 1800, she was involved in the battle of Dunkirk.

In January 1805, she was sent to observe British movements off Toulon, along with Hortense. On 4 February, they attacked a convoy, destroying 7 ships. Three days later, they encountered the convoy escorted by the 20-gun sloop HMS Arrow and the 8-gun bomb vessel HMS Acheron; the frigates destroyed two Royal Navy vessels, and captured and burnt Duchess of Rutland and two other merchant vessels of the convoy.

In May 1807, Incorruptible, Annibal, Pomone, and the corvette Victorieuse engaged HMS Spartan off Cabrera in the Mediterranean.
