= French frigate Hortense =

Ship in the French Navy

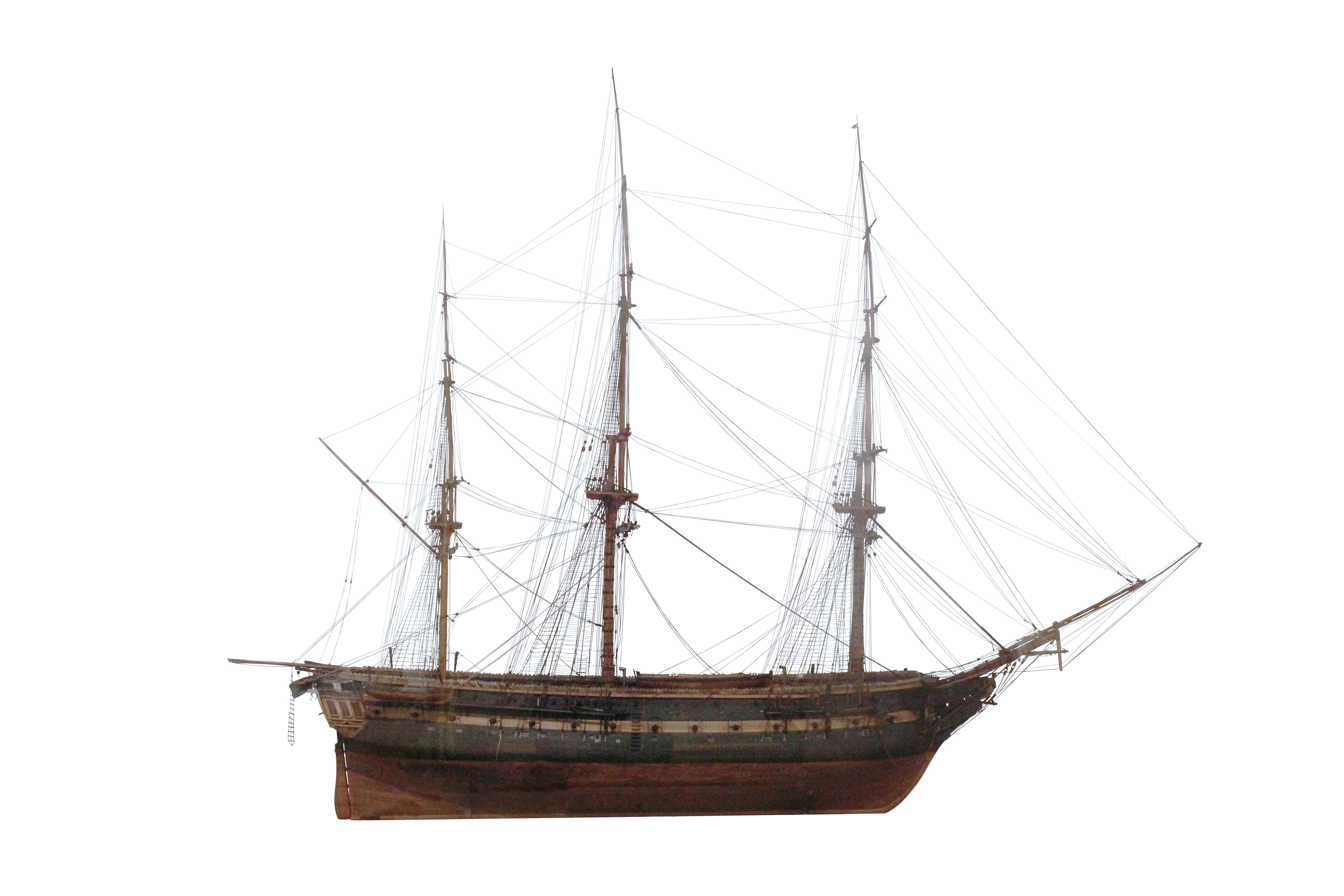
- Model of Hortense, on display at Toulon naval museum

History

France
- Name: Hortense
- Launched: 30 July 1803
- Fate: Condemned 25 November 1840

General characteristics
- Class & type: Hortense-class frigate
- Displacement: 1350 (French tons)
- Length: 48.75 m (159.9 ft)
- Beam: 12.2 m (40 ft)
- Draught: 5.9 m (19 ft)
- Propulsion: Sails
- Sail plan: Ship
- Armament: 28 × 18-pounder long guns; 12 × 8-pounder long guns

Hortense was a 40-gun Hortense-class frigate and lead vessel of her class of the French Navy.

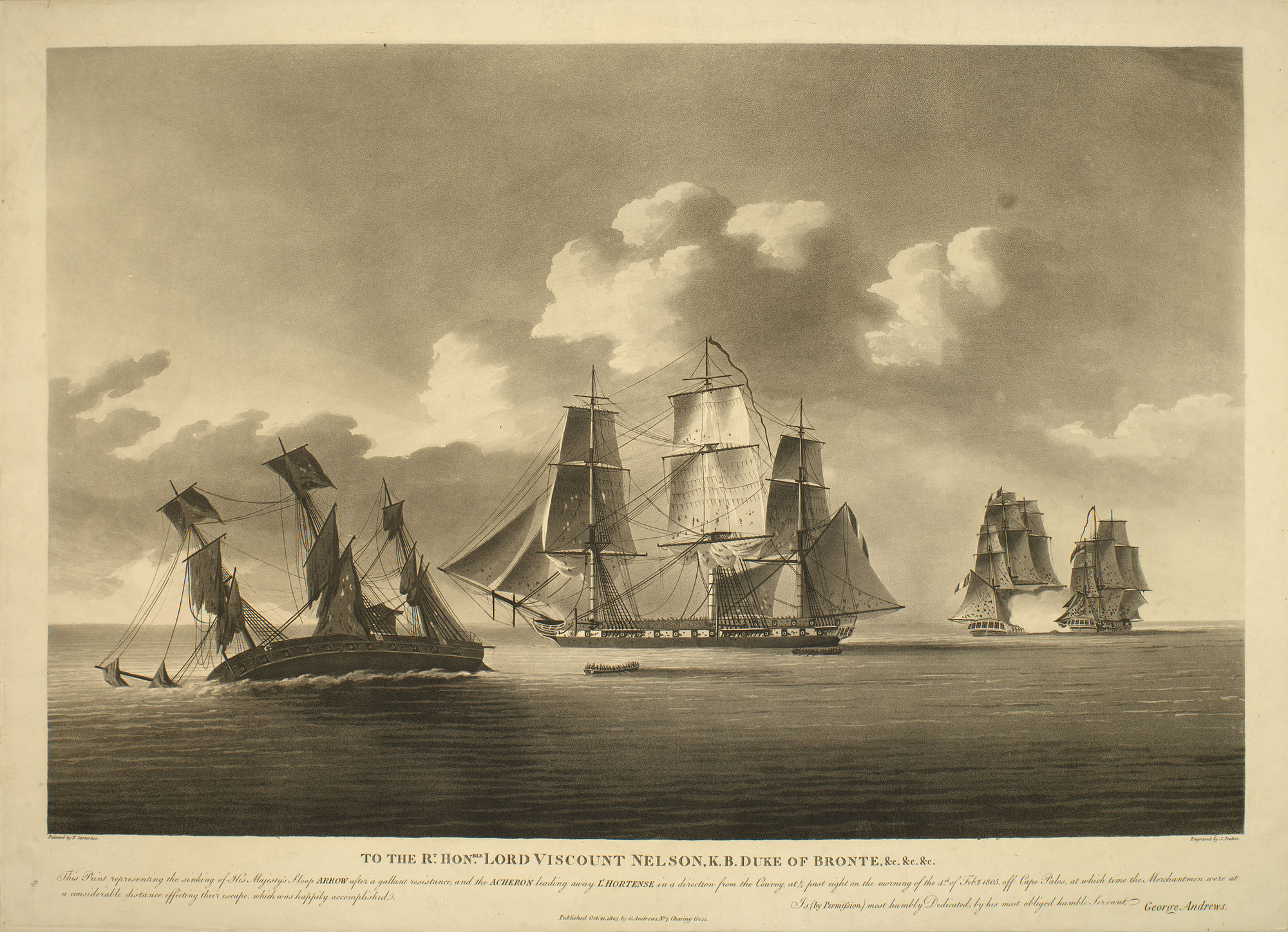
The Acheron leads the Hortense away (far left) at Cape Palos, 4 February 1805

In January 1805, under the command of Captain Delamarre de Lamellerie, she and Incorruptible were sent to observe British movements off Toulon. On 4 February they attacked a convoy, destroying seven ships. Three days later, they encountered another convoy escorted by the 20-gun sloop HMS Arrow and the 8-gun bomb vessel HMS Acheron; the French frigates destroyed the two Royal Navy vessels and captured and burnt Duchess of Rutland and two other merchant vessels of the convoy.

Then on 12 May 1805, Hortense and Hermione captured the 18-gun ship-sloop HMS Cyane. Cyane was cruising between Barbados and Martinique when she encountered a French fleet under Admiral Villeneuve. Hortense and Hermione so out-gunned Cyane that her captain, Commander George Cadogan, had no choice but to strike his colours.

Hortense took part in the Battle of Cape Finisterre, in the Battle of Trafalgar and in Lamellerie's expedition.

In 1814, she was renamed to Flore.
