= Hugh Tweedie =

Royal Navy Admiral (1877–1951)

Admiral Sir Hugh Tweedie KCB
- Born: 5 April 1877; Old Charlton, Kent
- Died: 20 August 1951 (aged 74); Somerset
- Military career
- Allegiance: United Kingdom
- Branch: Royal Navy
- Service years: 1891–1939
- Rank: Admiral
- Commands: Nore Command
- Awards: KCB (1933); CB (1919); Order of the Rising Sun (Japan); Officier Légion d'honneur (France)
- Other work: Convoy Commodore (1940); Younger Brother, Trinity House; Justice of the Peace; Deputy Lieutenant; Somerset County Councillor; Published: The story of a naval life (1939)

Admiral Sir Hugh Justin Tweedie KCB (5 April 1877 – 20 August 1951) was an officer in the Royal Navy who served in the First and Second World War.

== Naval career ==
Tweedie was born at Charlton, Kent, the son of General Michael Tweedie of the Royal Artillery, and his wife Louisa Bateson Hammond. He joined the Royal Navy in 1891. As a midshipman on HMS Dreadnought he witnessed the sinking of HMS Victoria after she collided with HMS Camperdown. He served in Rodney and the sailing corvette Active as the midshipman of the fore cross trees in 1896. On Rodney he undertook a course on mine warfare. His instructor was Robert Falcon Scott.

At the time of the Diamond Jubilee Review in 1897, Tweedie was appointed to the destroyer Virago. He then served on the cruiser Phoebe at the Cape. Promoted to lieutenant he received his first command, the governor's paddle yacht Countess of Derby for an operation on the Bumpeh River in Sierra Leone. There had been an uprising due to the imposition of Hut tax. He was tasked to transport a detachment of troops up the river to attack the rebel position. The detachment managed to get lost and Tweedie led a second native militia in a successful operation against the rebel position.

Tweedie's next posting was the destroyer Flying Fish, the cruiser Minerva and then the new battleship Albion in China. He was a member of the first officer PT class at Britannia Royal Naval College before being appointed PT officer on King Alfred, flagship in China, in 1906 under Sir Arthur Moore. Promoted to commander in 1910 he had charge of the destroyers Bonetta, Wolf, Cameleon and Hope under Reginald Tyrwhitt

Tweedie's next command as captain was the cruiser Essex in Mexico at time of United States occupation of Veracruz. He was sent by Admiral Cradock from Veracruz with a small party to take despatches through the rebel lines to Mexico City. He returned with some one hundred American refugees for which he was thanked by President Woodrow Wilson. Essex then steamed to Canada. Approaching the St Lawrence River, a distress call was received from RMS Empress of Ireland which had collided with a collier. Essex was three hours away at full steam only to arrive in time to pick up bodies as Empress of Ireland had sunk. In Canada Tweedie spent sometime as aide-de-camp to the Governor General of Canada, the Duke of Connaught.

Tweedie's next command in 1915 was the monitor Marshal Ney which was being built in Jarrow. The ship was nearly destroyed before it was launched in a Zeppelin raid on the town. Tweedie's wife Constance launched the ship. A monitor, is a shallow draught barge with a large gun turret mounted on top. The ship turned out to be very difficult. She was designed to make eight knots (15 km/h; 9.2 mph) though she never much exceeded four knots (7.4 km/h; 4.6 mph). Her diesel engines were unreliable. She had a beam of ninety feet (27 m) and was very unmanageable in any wind. She saw action off the Belgium coast bombarding German positions with her fifteen-inch (380 mm) guns. In 1916, Tweedie was appointed to another monitor, Sir Thomas Picton, seeing action in the Mediterranean Sea around Salonica and the Dardanelles.

In 1917 Tweedie returned to Rosyth. He was promoted to Commodore of the Grand Fleet Flotillas, a command of some 150 ships, under Admiral Beatty. His flagship was Castor. It fell to him at the end of hostilities to lead out all his destroyer flotillas to meet the German High Seas Fleet and escort them into the Firth of Forth. This was quite a feat of seamanship. The destroyer flotillas were to be fifty miles (80 km) ahead of the main British fleet. The ships were spread out on a front of five miles (8.0 km) to ensure the German fleet that was steaming towards them was not missed in the dark. The German destroyers were then escorted back to Rosyth, altogether a total of 170 ships. He was made a Commander of the Order of the Bath (CB) in 1919.

After the First World War, Tweedie was involved with the coastguard. In 1922 he commanded the battleship Marlborough in the Mediterranean during the Chanak Crisis. In 1923 he had a shore job as director of training. In 1926 he was promoted to rear admiral and Senior Naval Officer on the Yangtze River, China. China was in a state of upheaval with war lords, communists and pirates operating on the river. His flagship was HMS Bee, an Insect-class gunboat.

Tweedie was promoted to vice admiral and Commander-in-Chief Africa Station in 1930. His command stretched from the Cape of Good Hope up both the east and west coasts of Africa to the equator. HMS Calcutta cruised each coast twice a year. In 1933 he was Commander-in-Chief, The Nore and was knighted KCB. He was promoted to admiral in 1935.

Tweedie retired from the navy in 1936 and in 1939 published his autobiography. However, he was recalled at the outbreak of the Second World War. In 1940 he was Commodore of Convoys from HMS Eaglet.

Tweedie served as Deputy Lieutenant and J.P. He died in 1951 at the age of 74.

Tweedie married Constance Marion Crossman in 1907 in Japan. They had three sons and four daughters. Michael who was killed 1937 serving in the Guides Cavalry. Hugo who followed his fathers into the navy was awarded DSC 1942 as commander of HMS Tynedale during the St Nazaire Raid. Vere Tweedie who served in the Gold Coast Regiment of Royal West African Frontier Force awarded MC in 1945 during an action behind Japanese lines on the Tamandu to An road in the Arakan Burma.

Military offices
Preceded by Sir Rudolf Burmester	Commander-in-Chief, Africa Station; 1931–1933	Succeeded by Sir Edward Evans
Preceded by Sir Reginald Tyrwhitt	Commander-in-Chief, The Nore; 1933–1935	Succeeded by Sir Edward Evans
