= Reginald Servaes =

British admiral

Vice-Admiral Reginald Servaes CB CBE
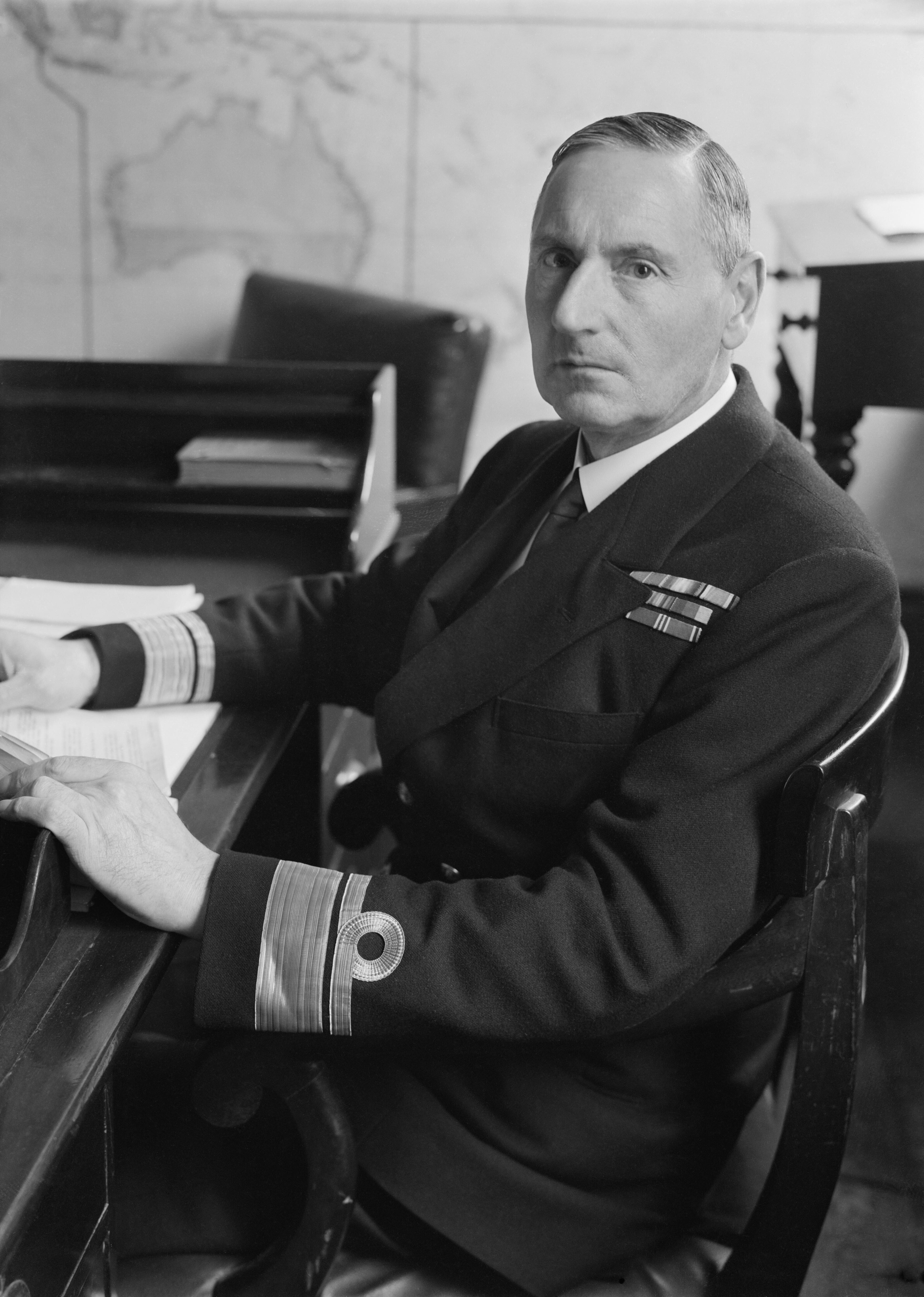
- Rear Admiral Servaes at the Admiralty, March 1944
- Born: Reginald Maxwell Servaes; 25 July 1893
- Died: 18 November 1978 (aged 85)
- Military career
- Allegiance: United Kingdom
- Branch: Royal Navy
- Service years: 1906–1948
- Rank: Vice-Admiral
- Commands: HMS Resource; HMS London; Reserve Fleet
- Conflicts: World War I World War II
- Awards: Companion of the Order of the Bath; Commander of the Order of the British Empire

Vice-Admiral Reginald Maxwell Servaes, CB, CBE (25 July 1893 – 18 November 1978) was Flag Officer commanding the Reserve Fleet.

== Early life ==
Servaes was son of Julius Max(imus) Servaes (1863-1947) and Constance Violet, daughter of Joseph Coltart, a Liverpool shipowner. Julius Servaes, like his father, also Julius (died 1902), was a cotton merchant; the senior Julius had been a partner in the firm of J. H. Schroder & Co., involved in the Liverpool cotton trade, before establishing his own general agency and commission business and becoming prominent in the local community.

== Life and career ==
Servaes joined the Royal Navy in 1906 and saw service in World War I. He became commanding officer of the repair ship Resource in 1937 and Director of Local Defence at the Admiralty in 1938. He served in World War II as commanding officer of the cruiser London from 1940 and saw action with the arctic convoys before becoming Assistant Chief of the Naval Staff in 1943.

After the War he became Rear Admiral commanding 2nd Cruiser Squadron in the British Pacific Fleet in 1945 and Flag Officer commanding the Reserve Fleet in 1947 before retiring in 1948.

== Personal life ==
Servaes was married firstly, in 1919, to Hilda Edith Anna Johnson, and secondly, in 1959, to Marian Frances Mansel Glasbrook, widow of stockbroker Humphrey Vivian Bond. A notable descendant is the actor Tom Hiddleston.

Military offices
Preceded by Bernard Rawlings	Assistant Chief of the Naval Staff (Foreign); 1943–1945	Succeeded by Edward Bellars
Preceded by Leslie Ashmore	Commander-in-Chief, Reserve Fleet; 1947–1948	Succeeded by Sir Robin Bridge
