= Reserve Fleet (United Kingdom) =

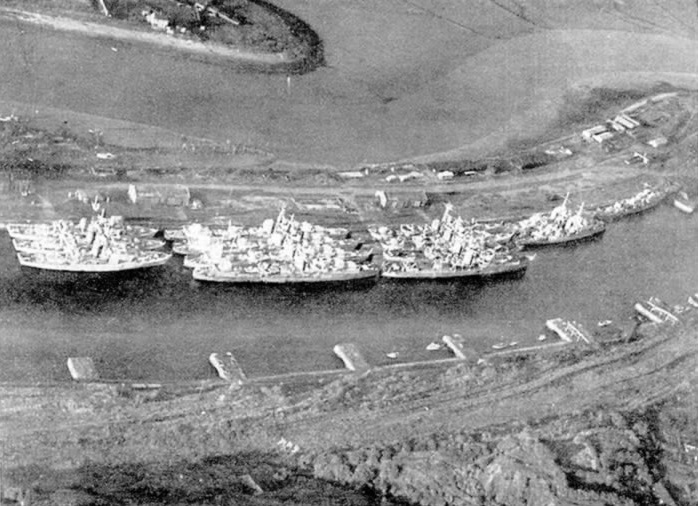
- Ships of the Royal Navy reserve fleet in Penarth Docks (1954)
- Active: 1919–1960
- Country: United Kingdom
- Branch: Royal Navy
- Type: Fleet
- Garrison/HQ: Portsmouth

The Reserve Fleet was a Royal Navy formation of decommissioned vessels which could be brought to a state of readiness at time of war.

In the early years of the 18th century ships were "laid up in ordinary" at various British naval bases forming a repository for serviceable but decommissioned ships. Sir John Fisher's reforms made these reserve ships more ready for combat, in the lead up to the First World War.

Whilst warships had been laid up in ordinary routinely, the establishment of a Reserve Fleet as a separate, formally established naval formation dated to the change in title and appointment of Vice Admiral Henry Oliver in November 1919. With the breakup of the Grand Fleet in April 1919, Royal Navy forces in home waters was divided between a new Atlantic Fleet consisting of the most powerful naval units, and a Home Fleet consisting of ships with nucleus crews and other vessels. On 8 April Admiral Sir Charles E. Madden became Commander-in-Chief, Home and Atlantic Fleets, and Vice-Admiral Sir Henry F. Oliver was appointed in command of the Home Fleet. The Home Fleet then consisted of the 3rd Battle Squadron of six ships, and the Fourth and Fifth Destroyer Flotillas totaling 35 destroyers and destroyer leaders. This arrangement lasted until 1 October 1919, when the Fleet was reduced to a reserve basis, and "Home Fleet" was dropped from the Commander-in-Chief's title. On 1 November Vice-Admiral Oliver's title was changed to Vice-Admiral Commanding, Reserve Fleet.

It continued to exist in the inter-war years but in 1930 the Admiralty reduced it in size on the basis that war was unlikely in the next ten years, under the Government's Ten Year Rule. At the start of the Second World War the Reserve Fleet, under the command of Vice Admiral Sir Max Horton, was again brought to a state of readiness. Some 15,000 men were called up in May 1939 to man the Reserve Fleet which became ready for service on 15 June 1939. During the 1950s ships were regularly 'cocooned' for the Reserve Fleet and it ceased to exist in 1960.

== Commanding admirals ==
Admirals commanding included:

- 1919–1920 Vice-Admiral Sir Henry Oliver
- 1920–1922 Vice-Admiral Sir Richard Phillimore
- 1922–1923 Vice-Admiral Sir Douglas Nicholson
- 1923–1924 Vice-Admiral Sir William Goodenough
- 1924–1926 Vice-Admiral Sir Victor Stanley
- March–October 1926 Vice-Admiral Sir Rudolph Bentinck
- 1926–1928 Vice-Admiral Sir Hugh Watson
- 1928–1929 Vice-Admiral Sir William Boyle
- 1929–1930 Vice-Admiral Percival Hall-Thompson
- 1930–1932 Vice-Admiral Sir Frank Larken
- 1932–1934 Vice-Admiral Sir William Kerr
- 1934–1935 Vice-Admiral Edward Astley-Rushton
- 1935–1937 Vice-Admiral Sir Gerald Dickens
- 1937–1939 Vice Admiral Sir Max Horton, Vice-Admiral Commanding Reserve Fleet, flag aboard HMS Hawkins until June 1938. Hawkins was disarmed at the time.

=== From 1944 ===
Included:

- 1944–1945 Rear-Admiral Charles Harris
- 1945–1947 Rear-Admiral Leslie Ashmore
- 1947–1948 Rear-Admiral Reginald Servaes
- 1948–1951 Vice-Admiral Sir Robin Bridge
- 1951–1953 Vice-Admiral Sir Henry McCall
- 1953–1954 Vice-Admiral Sir Ian Campbell
- 1954–1955 Vice-Admiral Sir John Eaton
- 1955–1956 Vice-Admiral Sir Peter Cazalet
- 1956–1958 Vice-Admiral Sir Richard Onslow
- 1958–1959 Vice-Admiral Sir Guy Sayer
- 1959–1960 Rear-Admiral John Grant

== Reserve divisions ==
Subordinate officers included:

=== Portsmouth Division ===
==== Rear Admiral Commanding Portsmouth Reserve ====
- Rear-Admiral Edward F. Bruen, 1 February 1919 – 23 April 1919
- Rear-Admiral Cole C. Fowler, 23 April 1919 – 23 April 1920
- Rear-Admiral Clement Greatorex, 23 April 1920 – 1 October 1921
- Rear-Admiral Edmond H. Parker, 1 October 1921

=== Devonport Division ===
==== Rear Admiral Commanding Devonport Reserve ====
- Rear-Admiral Douglas R. L. Nicholson, 1 February 1919 – 18 March 1919
- Rear-Admiral James A. Fergusson, 18 March 1919 – 9 April 1919
- Rear-Admiral Maurice Woollcombe, 9 April 1919 – 9 April 1920
- Rear-Admiral Philip H. Colomb, 9 April 1920
- Rear-Admiral Charles D. Johnson, 9 April 1921

==== Captain Commanding ====
- Captain Alfred A. Ellison, 16 May 1922 – 1 November 1922
- Captain Rowland H. Bather, 15 April 1922 – 1 July 1922 (temporary)
- Captain John E. Cameron, 1 November 1922 – April, 1924
- Captain Herbert A. Buchanan-Wollaston, 25 July 1927 – 17 April 1928
- Captain Edward B. Cloete, 3 November 1929 – 4 May 1931

=== Nore Division ===
==== Rear Admiral Commanding Nore Reserve ====
- Rear-Admiral A. Thomas Hunt, 1 February 1919 – 8 March 1919
- Rear-Admiral Henry L. Mawbey, 17 March 1919 – 17 March 1920
- Rear-Admiral Vivian H. G. Bernard, 17 March 1920 – 17 March 1921
- Rear-Admiral William J. S. Alderson, 17 March 1921 – 15 April 1922

==== Captain Commanding Nore Reserve ====
- Captain Lawrence W. Braithwaite, 24 April 1925 – 17 August 1926
- Captain Arthur L. Snagge, c. 1927
- Captain Claude C. Dobson, 17 October 1931 – 17 October 1933
- Captain Richard M. King, 17 October 1933 – 16 January 1935 (and as Captain of Cardiff)
- Captain Hamilton C. Allen, 16 January 1935 – 24 July 1935
- Captain John H. Young, 1 October 1935 – 1 September 1936

=== Rosyth Division ===
==== Vice-Admiral/Rear Admiral Commanding Rosyth Reserve ====
- Vice-Admiral Sir Trevylyan D. W. Napier, 1 February 1919 – 1 May 1919
- Rear-Admiral Charles F. Corbett, 1 May 1919 – 1 May 1920
- Rear-Admiral Crawford Maclachlan, 1 May 1920
- Captain Henry P. Boxer, 28 January 1937 – 1 June 1938

=== Portland Division ===
==== Rear Admiral Commanding Portland Reserve ====
- Rear-Admiral Sir Douglas R. L. Nicholson, 1 November 1919 – 1 April 1920

=== Vice-Admiral Reserve Fleet destroyers ===
==== Vice-Admiral Commanding ====
- Vice-Admiral Sir R. H. T. Raikes (1939-1945) (retired)

== Sources ==
- Heathcote, Tony (2002). The British Admirals of the Fleet 1734 – 1995. Pen & Sword Ltd. ISBN 0-85052-835-6.
- Moretz, Joseph (2002). The Royal Navy and the Capital Ship in the Interwar Period: An Operational Perspective. Routledge. ISBN 978-0714651965.
