= Gerald Charles Dickens =

Admiral in the Royal Navy and grandson of Charles Dickens (1879–1962)

Admiral Sir Gerald Charles Dickens KCVO CB CMG
- Admiral Sir Gerald Charles Dickens
- Born: 13 October 1879; Kensington, London, England
- Died: 19 November 1962 (aged 83); London, England
- Spouse: Kathleen Pearl Birch
- Military career
- Allegiance: United Kingdom
- Branch: Royal Navy
- Rank: Admiral
- Conflicts: World War I and World War II
- Awards: Knight Commander of the Royal Victorian Order; Companion of the Order of the Bath; Companion of the Order of St Michael and St George

Admiral Sir Gerald Louis Charles Dickens KCVO CB CMG (13 October 1879 – 19 November 1962) was a senior Royal Navy officer and the grandson of Victorian novelist Charles Dickens.

== Early life and career ==
Born in Kensington, London, Dickens was the son of Marie-Thérèse Louise (Roche) and Sir Henry Fielding Dickens, a barrister. His maternal grandfather was French and his maternal grandmother was from a Jewish family from Bohemia and Germany. Dickens' great-grandfather was composer and pianist Ignaz Moscheles.

Dickens joined the naval college HMS Britannia at Dartmouth in Devon in 1894 as a Naval Cadet, following preparatory education at Stubbington House School. Dickens served on HMS Blake with the Channel Fleet, 1896–1897, and HMS Eclipse in the East Indies Station, 1897–1899. He was promoted Sub-Lieutenant in 1899, and in that year he served aboard HMS Cleopatra before transferring to the Royal Naval College, Greenwich where he was based from 1899 to 1900. He went on to serve on HMS Griffon and HMS Desperate with the Mediterranean Fleet from 1900 to 1901.

== World War I and after ==
Promoted to lieutenant on 1 January 1902 and commander on the outbreak of World War I in 1914, he commanded HMS Harpy in the Mediterranean Fleet from 1913 to 1915; seeing action at Gallipoli in 1915. He was appointed flag commander to the Commander-in-Chief, Mediterranean Fleet, from 1917 to 1918, and became a captain in 1919, in which year he was awarded the CMG.

Dickens was appointed to the Directing Staff of the Imperial Defence College from 1926 to 1929, and commanded HMS Repulse from 1929 to 1931. He was a Naval aide-de-camp to George V from 1931 to 1932, and was promoted to rear admiral in 1932. He was the Director of Naval Intelligence from 1932 to 1935, and was awarded the CB in 1934 and, following his appointment as Rear-Admiral Commanding, Reserve Fleet in 1935, he was promoted to vice admiral in 1936. Created KCVO in 1937, Dickens was put on the retired list in 1938 and was appointed Admiral (Retired) in 1940.

== World War II ==
He was recommissioned as a rear admiral in 1939 and served in World War II as a naval attaché at The Hague in the Netherlands from February 1940 during the German invasion. In March 1940 he was joined by Charles M. Morrell, the assistant naval attaché to the Netherlands and Belgium. His important role in helping to organise the British evacuation of the Netherlands when the Germans invaded in May 1940 is told in the book 'Escape From Holland' by Chris Hunt. Dickens's role did not end with the surrender on 14 May. He evacuated to Britain by destroyer (HMS Wessex (D43)), where he was assigned as principal liaison officer, Allied Navies. During this period, his efforts (and those of the Dutch naval attaché in London, Lieutenant Commander A. de Booy) were essential in forging a good working relationship between the Royal Dutch and British Navies. He served as flag officer in Tunisia from 1943 to 1944 and as Flag Officer, Holland from September 1944 to 1945, when he retired. In 1945, he was appointed Commander of the Legion of Merit (United States) and a Chevalier of the Légion d'honneur (France).

== Death ==
Sir Gerald Dickens died of a heart attack in London aged 83 in 1962 and was buried at sea from HMS Kirkliston off Chatham. He was the father of Captain Peter Dickens RN, the grandfather of actor Gerald Charles Dickens and great-grandfather of actor Harry Lloyd.

== Publications ==
- 'Bombing and Strategy. The Fallacy of Total War' (Sampson Low, Marston and Company, London, 1947)
- 'The Dress of the British Sailor' (National Maritime Museum, London, 1957).

== Decorations ==
- 14 March 1916 – Mentioned in Dispatches – Commander Gerald Charles Dickens – commended for service in action in despatches received from the Vice-Admiral Commanding the Eastern Mediterranean Squadron covering operation between the time of the landing on the Gallipoli Peninsula in April, 1915, and the evacuation in December, 1915-January, 1916.
- 21 June 1918 – Chevalier of the Légion d'honneur (France) for distinguished services during the war.
- 1 April 1919 – Companion of the Order of St Michael and St George (CMG) For valuable services as Flag Commander to Vice-Admiral The Hon. Sir Somerset A. Gough-Calthorpe, G.C.M.G., K.C.B., C.V.O., British Commander-in-Chief, Mediterranean.
- 8 June 1920 – Commander of the Order of the Crown of Italy for distinguished services during the war.
- 1 January 1934 – Companion of the Order of the Bath (CB)
- 20 May 1937 – Knight Commander of the Royal Victorian Order (KCVO)
- Grand Cross of the Order of Orange-Nassau (Netherlands)
- 20 March 1945 – Commander of the United States Legion of Merit For distinguished service as Flag Officer, Tunisia, from 3 August 1943, to 1 January 1944.
- 1 February 1949 – Grand Officer of the Order of Leopold For distinguished services rendered to Belgium during the war.

== See also ==
- Dickens family

Military offices
Preceded by Cecil Usborne	Director of Naval Intelligence; 1932–1935	Succeeded by James Troup
Preceded by Edward Astley-Rushton	Commander-in-Chief, Reserve Fleet; 1935–1937	Succeeded by Sir Max Horton
