= Admiral Napier (disambiguation) =

Trevylyan Napier (1867–1920) was a Royal Navy vice admiral. Admiral Napier may also refer to:

- Alexander Napier (2nd Laird of Merchiston) (died c. 1474), Vice-Admiral of Scotland
- Charles Napier (Royal Navy officer) (1786–1860), British Royal Navy admiral
- William Napier (Royal Navy officer) (1877–1951), British Royal Navy admiral
