= Admiral Ashmore =

Admiral Ashmore may refer to:

- Edward Ashmore (1919–2016), British Royal Navy admiral
- Leslie Ashmore (1893–1974), British Royal Navy vice admiral
- Peter Ashmore (1921–2002), British Royal Navy vice admiral
