= Edward Astley-Rushton =

Royal Navy Vice-Admiral (1879-1935)

Vice-Admiral Edward Astley-Rushton CB CMG
- Born: 4 September 1879
- Died: 18 July 1935 (aged 55)
- Military career
- Allegiance: United Kingdom
- Branch: Royal Navy
- Rank: Vice-Admiral
- Commands: HMAS Melbourne; Royal Naval Staff College; 2nd Cruiser Squadron in the Home Fleet; Reserve Fleet
- Conflicts: World War I
- Awards: Companion of the Order of the Bath; Companion of the Order of St Michael and St George

Vice-Admiral Edward Astley Astley-Rushton, CB, CMG (4 September 1879 – 18 July 1935) was a senior Royal Navy officer who commanded the Reserve Fleet.

== Naval career ==
Astley-Rushton was commissioned in the Royal Navy, where he was confirmed as sub-lieutenant on 15 February 1899 and promoted to lieutenant on 15 February 1900. The following month, he was on 8 March posted to the destroyer HMS Flying Fish, while she was attached to the Victory, naval school of telegraphy.

He served in World War I as Second-in-Command of the cruiser HMS Southampton and as commanding officer of the cruiser HMAS Melbourne. He became deputy director of Training and Staff Duties at the Admiralty in 1919, Director of the Royal Naval Staff College in 1922 and Director of the Naval Mobilisation Department at the Admiralty from 1928 to 1930. He went on to be Commander of the 2nd Cruiser Squadron in the Home Fleet in 1932 and Vice-Admiral Commanding the Reserve Fleet in 1934 before his death in 1935.

Military offices
Preceded by Sir William Kerr	Commander-in-Chief, Reserve Fleet; 1934–1935	Succeeded by Sir Gerald Dickens
