= HMS Juno (1895) =

Eclipse-class cruiser

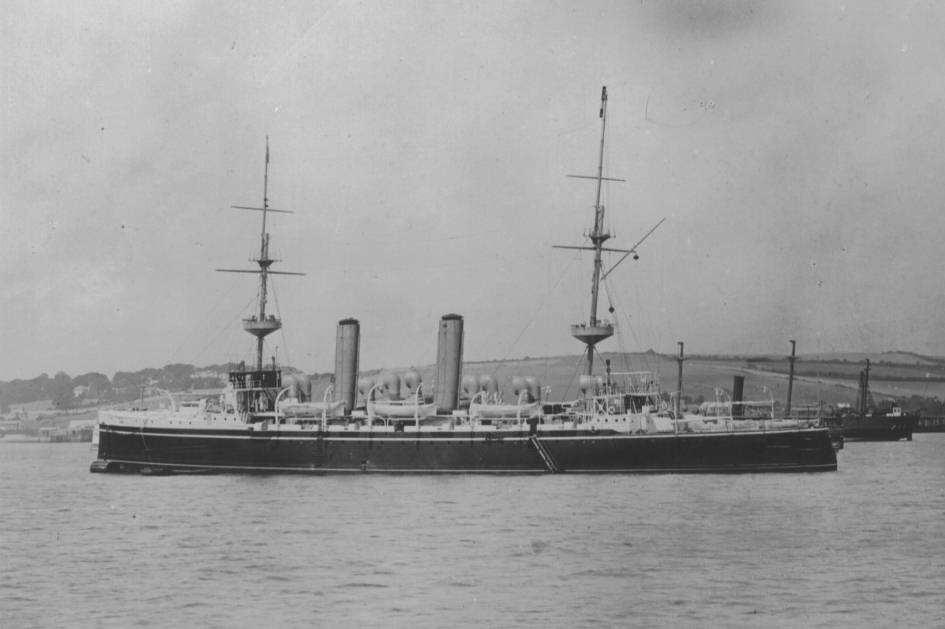
- Juno circa. 1901

History

United Kingdom
- Name: HMS Juno
- Namesake: Juno
- Builder: Naval Construction & Armaments Co., Barrow-in-Furness
- Laid down: 22 June 1894
- Launched: 16 November 1895
- Completed: 16 June 1897
- Fate: Sold for scrap, 24 September 1920

General characteristics
- Class & type: Eclipse-class protected cruiser
- Displacement: 5,600 long tons (5,690 t)
- Length: 350 ft (106.7 m)
- Beam: 53 ft 6 in (16.3 m)
- Draught: 20 ft 6 in (6.25 m)
- Installed power: 9,600 ihp (7,200 kW); 8 cylindrical boilers
- Propulsion: 2 shafts, 2 Inverted triple-expansion steam engines
- Speed: Max 18.5 knots (34.3 km/h; 21.3 mph), 16 knots (30 km/h; 18 mph) sustained.
- Complement: 450
- Armament: As built: 5 × QF 6-inch (152 mm) guns; 6 × QF 4.7-inch (120 mm) guns; 6 × 3-pounder QF guns; 3 × 18-inch torpedo tubes; After 1905: 11 × six-inch QF guns; 9 × 76 mm (3.0 in) QF guns; 7 × 3-pounder QF guns; 3 × 18-inch torpedo tubes
- Armour: Gun shields: 3 in (76 mm); Engine hatch: 6 in (152 mm); Decks: 1.5–3 in (38–76 mm); Conning tower: 6 in (152 mm)

HMS Juno was an Eclipse-class protected cruiser built for the Royal Navy in the mid-1890s.

== Construction ==
In 1899, Juno was equipped with wireless, and took part in the Summer Manoeuvres of that year. She relayed a message from HMS Europa to HMS Alexandra over a distance of 95 miles, the longest ship to ship transmission to date.

== Service ==
In late March 1900 she was sent to Algiers to bring back to the United Kingdom the remains of Field Marshal Sir Donald Stewart, 1st Baronet, who had died there earlier that month.

In 1901, she was one of two escort ships for HMS Ophir, which carried the Duke and Duchess of Cornwall and York (later King George V and Queen Mary) during their tour of the British Empire.

The following year she served in the cruiser squadron. In May 1902 she was taken into Portsmouth for a refit, and the following month Captain David Beatty was appointed in command. She took part in the fleet review held at Spithead on 16 August 1902 for the coronation of King Edward VII, and visited the Aegean Sea for combined manoeuvres with other ships of the Channel squadron and Mediterranean Fleet the following month. After returning to Portsmouth in October, she carried the Lord-Lieutenant of Ireland and Lady Dudley on a visit to Waterford on 29 October. She was posted to the Mediterranean Fleet later that year, but Beatty paid her off not long after.

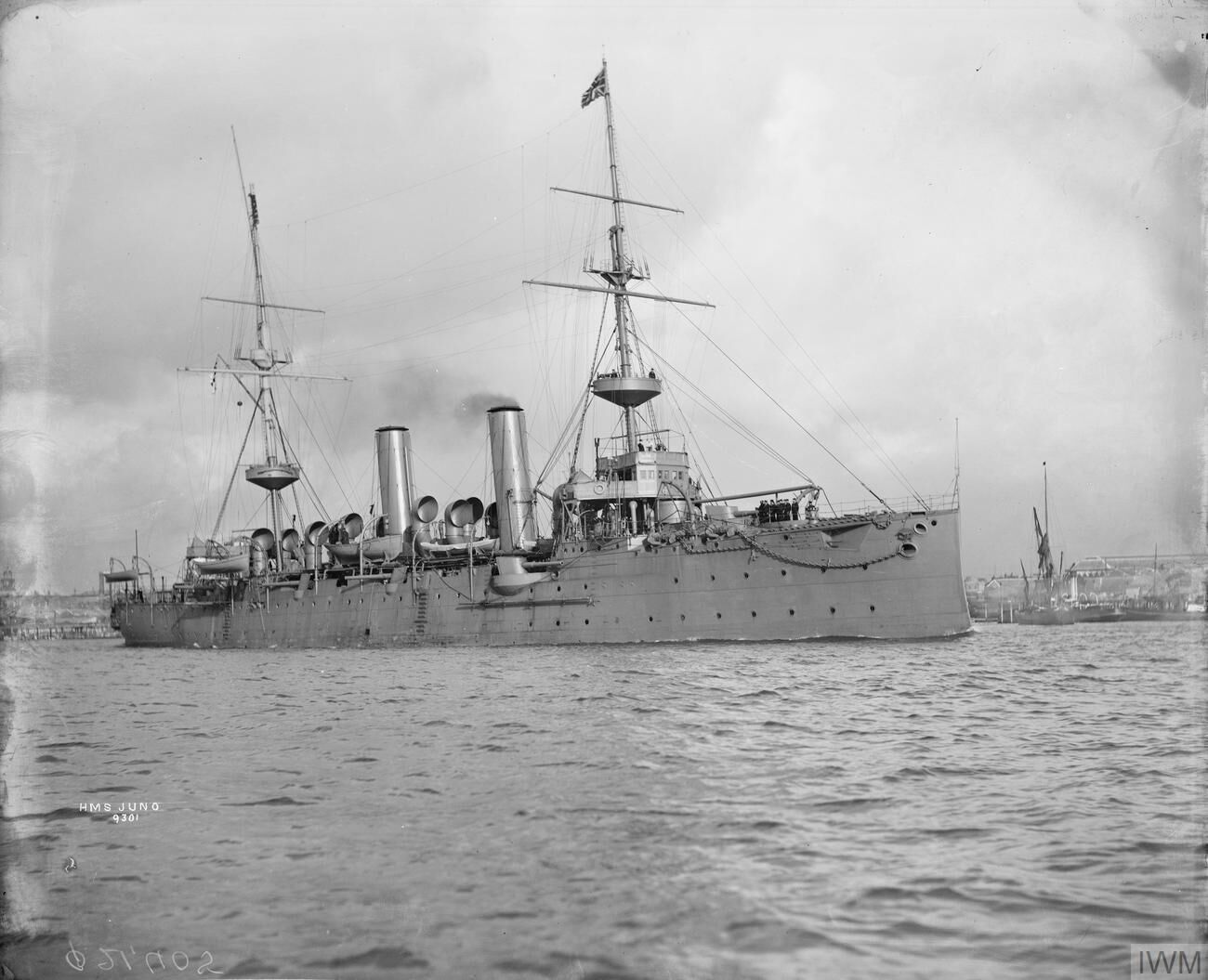
Juno during the First World War

At the beginning of World War I Juno was assigned to the 11th Cruiser Squadron operating from Ireland. In 1915 she was sent to the Persian Gulf and took part in an engagement at Bushire in July – August 1915 against Tangistani raids under Rais Ali Delvari.

On Friday 7 May 1915, Juno was returning to Queenstown, Ireland. At this point, she was considered very vulnerable to U-boats, being capable of only a sustained cruising speed of 16 knots. Having received warning of submarine activity in the area, the cruiser took evasive action and eventually returned to port. The RMS Lusitania was sunk by a U-boat later that day. Juno broke orders to go to the rescue but turned around before she left harbour.

In November 1916 Juno carried Abdulaziz bin Abdul Rahman Al Saud to Bushire to visit Sir Percy Cox, the British Political Resident in the Persian Gulf.

Juno was sold for scrap in 1920.
