= William Munro Kerr =

Royal Navy Vice-Admiral (1876–1959)

Vice-Admiral Sir William Munro Kerr KBE CB
- Born: 4 March 1876; Campsie, Stirlingshire, Scotland
- Died: 26 October 1959 (aged 83); Lymington, Hampshire, England
- Military career
- Allegiance: United Kingdom
- Branch: Royal Navy
- Service years: 1892–1936
- Rank: Vice-Admiral
- Commands: Reserve Fleet (1932–34); Chief of the Australian Naval Staff (1929–31); 1st Battle Squadron, Mediterranean Fleet (1928–29); HMS Eagle (1925–26); HMS Ajax (1924–25); HMS Calliope (1924_; Rosyth Dockyard (1921–23); HMS Caradoc (1917–19); HMS Centurion (1916)
- Conflicts: First World War
- Awards: Knight Commander of the Order of the British Empire; Companion of the Order of the Bath

Vice-Admiral Sir William Munro Kerr, KBE, CB (4 March 1876 – 26 October 1959) was a Royal Navy officer who served as First Naval Member and Chief of the Australian Naval Staff from 1929 to 1931.

== Naval service ==
Kerr joined the Royal Navy as a midshipman in 1892. In November 1901, Kerr—by then a lieutenant—was lent to the Royal Naval College, Greenwich for the compass course. In May the following year he was appointed lieutenant in charge of navigation at HMS Hermione, serving at the Mediterranean station. After serving in the First World War, he was appointed Captain of the Dockyard and King's Harbour Master at Rosyth in 1921 and Rear Admiral of the 1st Battle Squadron of the Mediterranean Fleet in 1928. He went on to be First Naval Member and Chief of the Australian Naval Staff in 1929 and, having been promoted to vice admiral in 1931, he became Commander-in-Chief of the Reserve Fleet later that year. He retired in 1936.

Military offices
Preceded by William Napier	Chief of the Australian Naval Staff; 1929–1931	Succeeded by Sir George Hyde
Preceded by Sir Frank Larken	Commander-in-Chief, Reserve Fleet; 1932–1934	Succeeded by Edward Astley-Rushton
