= Robin Bridge =

Royal Navy Admiral (1894–1971)

Admiral Sir Robin Bridge KBE CB
- Born: 15 February 1894; Radipole, Dorset, England
- Died: 19 February 1971 (aged 77); Gosport, Hampshire, England
- Military career
- Allegiance: United Kingdom
- Branch: Royal Navy
- Service years: 1907–1951
- Rank: Admiral
- Commands: HMS Eagle; Northern Naval Air Stations; Reserve Fleet
- Conflicts: World War I World War II
- Awards: Knight Commander of the Order of the British Empire; Companion of the Order of the Bath

Admiral Sir Arthur Robin Moore Bridge KBE CB (15 February 1894 – 19 February 1971) was a senior Royal Navy officer who commanded the Reserve Fleet.

== Naval career ==
Bridge joined the Royal Navy as a cadet at the Royal Naval College, Osborne, in 1907. He served in World War I as a lieutenant in the battleship HMS Marlborough in the Grand Fleet from 1916, as navigator in the sloop HMS Lupin from 1917 and then as navigator in the cruiser HMS Royalist.

He served in World War II as commanding officer of the aircraft carrier HMS Eagle from 1939, as Director of the Naval Air Division at the British Admiralty from 1941 and as Chief of Staff to Flag Officer, Carrier Training in 1943. He continued his war service as Commodore commanding Northern Naval Air Stations from 1944.

He became Flag Officer (Air) for the East Indies Station in 1945, Flag Officer (Air) for the British Pacific Fleet and East Indies Fleet in 1946 and Senior Naval Representative for British element of the Joint Chiefs of Staff Committee in Australia in 1947. He went on to be Flag Officer commanding the Reserve Fleet in 1948. He was appointed a Knight Commander of the Order of the British Empire in the 1950 Birthday Honours and retired in 1951.

Military offices
| Preceded by Reginald Servaes | Commander-in-Chief, Reserve Fleet; 1948–1951 | Succeeded by Sir Henry McCall |
