= HMS Isis (1896) =

Eclipse-class cruiser

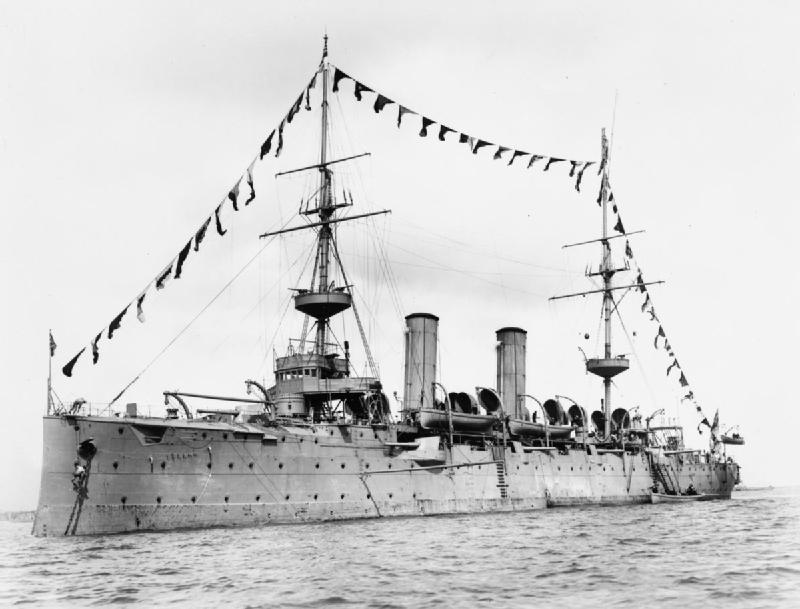
- Sister ship Venus at anchor during World War I

History

United Kingdom
- Name: Isis
- Namesake: Isis
- Builder: London & Glasgow Eng. & Iron Sbldg. Co., Govan
- Laid down: 30 January 1895
- Launched: 27 June 1896
- Completed: 10 May 1898
- Fate: Sold for scrap, 26 February 1920

General characteristics
- Class & type: Eclipse-class protected cruiser
- Displacement: 5,600 long tons (5,690 t)
- Length: 350 ft (106.7 m)
- Beam: 53 ft 6 in (16.3 m)
- Draught: 20 ft 6 in (6.25 m)
- Installed power: 8 cylindrical boilers; 9,600 ihp (7,200 kW)
- Propulsion: 2 shafts, 2 triple-expansion steam engines
- Speed: 18.5 knots (34.3 km/h; 21.3 mph)
- Complement: 450
- Armament: As built: 5 × 6 in (152 mm) guns; 6 × 4.7 in (120 mm) guns; 6 × 3 pdr guns; 3 × 18 in (450 mm) torpedo tubes; After 1905: 11 × 6 in (152 mm) guns; 9 × 76 mm (3.0 in) guns; 7 × 3 pdr guns; 3 × 18 in (450 mm) torpedo tubes
- Armour: Gun shields: 3 in (76 mm); Engine hatch: 6 in (152 mm); Decks: 1.5–3 in (38–76 mm); Conning tower: 6 in (152 mm)

HMS Isis was an Eclipse-class protected cruiser built for the Royal Navy in the mid-1890s.

== Technical details ==
Eclipse-class second-class protected cruisers were preceded by the shorter Astraea-class cruisers. Isis had a displacement of 5,600 long tons (5,700 t; 6,300 short tons) when at normal load. It had a total length of 373 ft (114 m), a beam of 53 ft 6 in (16.31 m), a metacentric height of around 3 m (9 ft 10 in), and a draught of 20 ft 6 in (6.25 m). It was powered by two inverted triple-expansion steam engines which used steam from eight cylindrical boilers. Using normal draught, the boilers were intended to provide the engines with enough steam to generate 8,000 indicated horsepower (6,000 kW) and to reach a speed of 18.5 knots (34.3 km/h; 21.3 mph); using forced draft, the equivalent figures were 9,600 indicated horsepower (7,200 kW) and a speed of 19.5 knots (36.1 km/h; 22.4 mph). Eclipse-class cruisers carried a maximum of 1,075 long tons (1,092 t) of coal and achieved maximum speed of 20 knots (37 km/h; 23 mph) in sea trials.

It carried five 40-calibre 6-inch (152 mm) quick-firing (QF) guns in single mounts protected by gun shields. One gun was mounted on the forecastle, two on the quarterdeck and one pair was abreast the bridge. They fired 100-pound (45 kg) shells at a muzzle velocity of 2,205 ft/s (672 m/s). The secondary armament consisted of six 40-calibre 4.7-inch (120 mm) guns; three on each broadside. Their 45-pound (20.4 kg) shells were fired at a muzzle velocity of 2,125 ft/s (648 m/s). It was fitted with three 18-inch torpedo tubes, one submerged tube on each broadside and one above water in the stern. Its ammunition supply consisted of 200 six-inch rounds per gun, 250 shells for each 4.7-inch gun, 300 rounds per gun for the 76 mm (3.0 in)s and 500 for each three-pounder. Isis had ten torpedoes, presumably four for each broadside tube and two for the stern tube.

== Service history ==
Isis deployed to the Mediterranean in 1898 for service in the Mediterranean Fleet. She participated between September and December 1898 in the operations at Crete of the International Squadron, a multinational force made up initially of ships of the Austro-Hungarian Navy, French Navy, Imperial German Navy, Italian Royal Navy (Regia Marina), Imperial Russian Navy, and Royal Navy that intervened between February 1897 and December 1898 in the 1897–1898 Greek Christian uprising against the Ottoman Empire′s rule on the island. By the time Isis joined the squadron, Austria-Hungary and the German Empire had withdrawn from the squadron, but the other four countries remained active in it. In the wake of a violent riot by Cretan Turks against British soldiers, sailors, and Christian civilians in Candia on 6 September 1898, Isis anchored in the harbor and men convicted of murdering British subjects during the riot were held aboard her while awaiting trial and execution. They were hanged in Candia during October and November 1898. Isis was still in service with the Mediterranean Fleet in early 1900.

By 28 December 1900 she was serving on the China Station In late October 1901 she left Hong Kong homebound, arriving at Spithead in December. She paid off at Chatham on 18 January 1902 and was placed in the Fleet Reserve as emergency ship. In May 1902, she was briefly tender to HMS Britannia, cadet training ship at Dartmouth. Following a refit with new steam and gunnery trials she was recommissioned as tender to the Britannia. In early October she left Plymouth for Gibraltar with cadets from the Britannia, following which she went to Las Palmas, cruising in the vicinity of the Canary Islands until she returned to Plymouth via Madeira in late November. During early Spring 1903 there was a similar training cruise, when Isis visited Arosa bay in January, then spent several weeks cruising in the Canary Islands before returning to Plymouth in late March.

On 22 April 1914, she collided with the British cargo ship Carbineer in the English Channel, sinking Carbineer 1.5 nautical miles (2.8 km) south-southeast of the Owers Lightship; Isis rescued Carbineer′s crew.

In August 1914 with the outbreak of war, Isis was brought out of the reserve and attached to the 11th Cruiser Squadron based on Queenstown (now Cobh), Ireland. She was later transferred to the North American and West Indies Station, and was scrapped in 1920.
