= William Scott Chalmers =

British Rear Admiral of the Royal Navy

Rear-Admiral William Scott Chalmers CBE DSC
- Born: 1 May 1888; Glasgow, Scotland
- Died: 11 June 1971 (aged 83); Titchfield, Hampshire
- Military career
- Allegiance: United Kingdom
- Branch: Royal Navy
- Service years: 1903–1943
- Rank: Rear-Admiral
- Commands: HMAS Australia; HMS Delhi
- Conflicts: World War I World War II

William Scott Chalmers (1 May 1888 – 11 June 1971) was a rear-admiral of the Royal Navy who served in World War I and World War II.

== Biography ==
Chalmers was born in Glasgow, Scotland, the son of Dr. Quintin Chalmers MD JP of London. He attended the Glasgow Academy from 1895 to 1902, entering the Navy on 15 September 1903 as a cadet at the Royal Naval College, Dartmouth (HMS Britannia).

He was commissioned as a sub-lieutenant on 21 December 1908, with seniority from 15 August 1908, and promoted to lieutenant on 9 February 1910, with seniority from 15 August 1909. From 1912 to 1914 he served as Navigating Officer of Rainbow, and then as First Lieutenant and Navigating Officer of Earl Grey, before serving in horse-drawn canal boats and with naval siege guns in Belgium from December 1914 to April 1915, later receiving the Distinguished Service Cross and the French Croix de Guerre. From 1915 until the end of the war Chalmers served on the staff of Admiral David Beatty, seeing action at the 1916 battle of Jutland aboard the battlecruiser Lion, and receiving a mention in despatches.

He was promoted to commander on 30 June 1921, and between 1923 and 1925 served at the Admiralty in the Training and Staff Duties Division. On 7 December 1925 he joined the battleship Revenge, serving in her until mid-1927. He was promoted to the rank of captain on 31 December 1927, and spent the first six months of 1928 taking a course at the Imperial Defence College.

From 22 March 1929 Chalmers was "loaned" to the Royal Australian Navy, taking passage aboard the cruiser HMAS Australia. He commanded Australia from 17 May 1929 until 26 September 1931, also serving as Chief Staff Officer to the Rear-Admiral Commanding HM Australian Squadron, before returning to the UK aboard the RMS Comorin in January 1932.

After serving on the staff of the Royal Naval College, Greenwich (HMS President) from August 1932 until July 1934, he commanded the cruiser Delhi in the Mediterranean Fleet from October 1934 to October 1936. From February 1937 he was Director of the Royal Naval College, Greenwich, until January 1939, receiving promotion to rear admiral on his retirement. He was made a Commander of the Order of the British Empire on 8 June 1939.

On 25 August 1939 Chalmers returned to active duty, serving on the Anglo-French Supreme War Council in 1939, on the Allied Military Council in 1940-41, and on the Admiralty Naval Staff in 1942. He retired for a second time in mid-1942, serving as Chairman of the Emergency Services Eastern Region in 1943-45.

After the war he worked for the Marconi Wireless Telegraph Company as Deputy to the Managing Director, and wrote several books of naval biography. Chalmers died in Titchfield, Hampshire, on 11 June 1971.

== Personal life ==
Chalmers married Muriel Violet Frances Agar in 1921, they had two sons.

== Publications ==
- The Life and Letters of David, Earl Beatty (Hodder & Stoughton, London, 1951)
- Max Horton and the Western Approaches : a biography of Admiral Sir Max Kennedy Horton (Hodder & Stoughton, London, 1954)
- Full Cycle : the life of Admiral Sir Bertram Home Ramsay (Hodder & Stoughton, London, 1959)
