= Guy Sayer (Royal Navy officer) =

Vice-Admiral Sir Guy Sayer KBE CB DSC
- Born: 1903
- Died: 1985 (aged 81–82)
- Military career
- Allegiance: United Kingdom
- Branch: Royal Navy
- Service years: 1916–1959
- Rank: Vice-Admiral
- Commands: HMS Ludlow; Vice Controller and Director of Naval Equipment; Home Fleet Training Squadron; Reserve Fleet
- Conflicts: World War I World War II
- Awards: Knight Commander of the Order of the British Empire; Companion of the Order of the Bath; Distinguished Service Cross

Vice-Admiral Sir Guy Bourchier Sayer KBE CB DSC (1903–1985) was a senior Royal Navy officer who commanded the Reserve Fleet.

== Naval career ==
After leaving Highgate School Sayer joined the Royal Navy in 1916 during World War I. He also served in World War II on staff of the Commander-in-Chief, The Nore from 1940, as commanding officer of the destroyer HMS Ludlow from 1940 and on the naval staff at the Admiralty from 1943. He was also appointed commander of Naval Assault Force (A) for Operation Zipper, the invasion of Malaya, in 1945.

He became Vice Controller and Director of Naval Equipment at the Admiralty in 1953 and Flag Officer, Home Fleet Training Squadron in 1956. He was Flag Officer, Helicopter Group during Operation Musketeer, the assault on Port Said during the Suez Crisis, in 1956. This group may have been part of Task Force 345. He became Admiral commanding the Reserve Fleet in 1958 before retiring in 1959, whereupon he was knighted.

After his retirement he spent much of his time until his death supporting his wife Sylvia in her conservation work aiming to keep the moorland of Dartmoor in Devon, England, free from anything that would spoil its natural beauty.

Military offices
Preceded by Sir Richard Onslow	Commander-in-Chief, Reserve Fleet; 1958–1959	Succeeded by John Grant
