= Leslie Ashmore =

Royal Navy officer

Vice-Admiral Leslie Ashmore CB DSO
- Born: 21 February 1893; Hendon, London
- Died: 10 January 1974 (aged 80); Godden Green, Kent
- Relatives: Admiral of the Fleet Sir Edward Ashmore (son); Vice Admiral Sir Peter Ashmore (son)
- Military career
- Allegiance: United Kingdom
- Branch: Royal Navy
- Service years: 1906–1947
- Rank: Vice-Admiral
- Commands: Reserve Fleet; HMS Malaya; HMS Valiant; HMS Kent
- Conflicts: First World War; Second World War
- Awards: Companion of the Order of the Bath; Distinguished Service Order

Vice-Admiral Leslie Haliburton Ashmore, CB, DSO (21 February 1893 – 10 January 1974) was a Royal Navy officer who served as Flag Officer commanding the Reserve Fleet from 1945 to 1947.

== Naval career ==
Ashmore joined the Royal Navy in 1906 and was promoted to the rank of Lieutenant in 1915 during the First World War. He became commanding officer of the cruiser Kent in 1938, just before the start of the Second World War and then became Naval Assistant to the Second Sea Lord in 1940. He became commanding officer of the battleship Valiant in 1942 and then commanding officer of the battleship Malaya in 1943. He went on to be Flag Officer commanding the Reserve Fleet in 1945 before retiring in 1947. He died in Kent at the age of 80.

== Family ==
Ashmore was married to Tamara Vasilevna Schutt. One son, Sir Edward Ashmore, became admiral of the fleet and Chief of the Defence Staff, while another was Vice Admiral Sir Peter Ashmore, who was the Master of the Household to HM the Queen from 1973 to 1986.

== Works ==
- Ashmore, Leslie (2001). Forgotten Flotilla: British Submariners in Russia 1914–1919. Manuscript Press. ISBN 978-1903702017.

Military offices
Preceded by Charles Harris	Commander-in-Chief, Reserve Fleet; 1945–1947	Succeeded by Reginald Servaes
