= John McClintock (Royal Navy officer) =

Royal Navy Vice-Admiral (1874–1929)

Vice-Admiral John McClintock CB DSO
- Born: John William Leopold McClintock; 26 July 1874
- Died: 23 March 1929 (aged 54)
- Military career
- Branch: Royal Navy
- Service years: 1887–1929
- Rank: Vice-Admiral
- Commands: HMS Lord Nelson (1906); HMS Dreadnought (1906); HMS King George V (1911)
- Wars: World War I
- Awards: Distinguished Service Order

Vice-Admiral John William Leopold McClintock CB DSO (26 July 1874 – 23 March 1929) was a Royal Navy officer who became President of the Royal Naval College, Greenwich.

== Naval career ==
Born the son of Admiral Sir Francis Leopold McClintock, McClintock joined the Royal Navy in 1887. He held the rank of lieutenant when in June 1902 he was posted to serve as 1st and gunnery lieutenant on the protected cruiser HMS Andromeda, flag ship of the Cruiser division of the Mediterranean Fleet. After six months he was on 31 December 1902 posted as 1st and gunnery lieutenant on the battleship HMS Jupiter, serving in the Channel Fleet.

He served in World War I, during which he commanded the battleship HMS Lord Nelson at the Gallipoli landings and, then from July 1916, commanded the battleship HMS Dreadnought followed by, from December 1916, the battleship HMS King George V. He became Commodore at the Royal Navy Barracks at Portsmouth in 1920, Director of Naval Artillery and Torpedo at the Admiralty in 1919 and Director of the Mobilisation Department at the Admiralty in 1923. He went on to be Commander of the 3rd Light Cruiser Squadron in 1924 and President of the Royal Naval College, Greenwich early in 1929 before his death a few months later.

Military offices
| Preceded by Sir Richard Webb | President, Royal Naval College, Greenwich; 1929 | Succeeded by Sir William Boyle |
