= Max Horton =

Royal Navy admiral (1883-1951)

Admiral Sir Max Horton GCB DSO** SGM
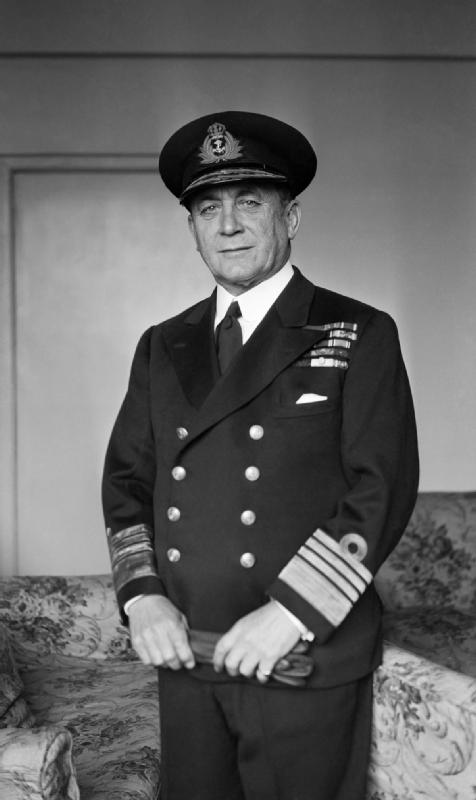
- Admiral Sir Max Horton, 1943
- Born: 29 November 1883; Rhosneigr, Anglesey
- Died: 30 July 1951 (aged 67); London
- Military career
- Allegiance: United Kingdom
- Branch: Royal Navy
- Service years: 1898–1945
- Rank: Admiral
- Commands: Western Approaches Command; Flag Officer Submarines; HMS E9
- Conflicts: First World War: North Sea & Baltic Sea; Second World War: Battle of the Atlantic
- Awards: Knight Grand Cross of the Order of the Bath; Distinguished Service Order & Two Bars; Sea Gallantry Medal; Mentioned in dispatches Order of St. George (Russia); Order of St. Vladimir (Russia); Order of St. Anna (Russia); Order of St. Stanislaus (Russia); Legion of Honour (France); Croix de Guerre (France); Order of Orange-Nassau (Netherlands); Legion of Merit (United States); Order of St. Olaf (Norway)

Admiral Sir Max Kennedy Horton (29 November 1883 – 30 July 1951) was a British submariner during the First World War and commander-in-chief of the Western Approaches in the later half of the Second World War, responsible for British participation in the Battle of the Atlantic.

== Early life ==
Max Horton was born in Rhosneigr, Anglesey to Robert Joseph Angel Horton and Esther/Hester Maude Goldsmid, of the famous Goldsmid/D'Avigdor Goldsmid Anglo-Jewish family.

Horton joined the Royal Navy officer training ship, HMS Britannia on 15 September 1898. Whilst on HMS Duke of Edinburgh, he was involved in the rescue efforts when SS Delhi ran aground off Cape Spartel. He was subsequently awarded the Board of Trade Medal for Saving Life at Sea in silver.

== First World War ==
The outbreak of war saw Lieutenant-Commander Horton in command of one of the first British ocean-going submarines, the 800-ton HMS E9. At dawn on 13 September 1914, he torpedoed the German light cruiser SMS Hela six miles southwest of Heligoland. Hela was hit amidships with the two torpedoes, fired from a range of 600 yards. All but two of her crew were rescued by the U-18 and another German ship. Although pursued most of the day by German naval forces, E9 managed to reach Harwich safely. Entering the port, Horton initiated the tradition of British submariners of hoisting the Jolly Roger after a successful patrol.

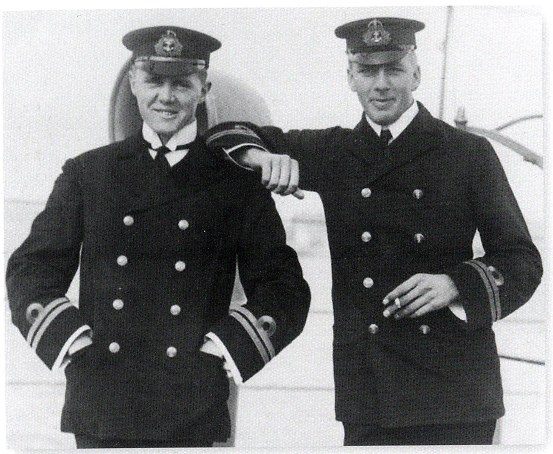
Horton (left) with Noel Laurence (right), commander of HMS E1, while serving in the Baltic

Three weeks later, Horton sank the German destroyer S116 off the mouth of the river Ems. For sinking the cruiser and the destroyer, Horton was awarded the Distinguished Service Order (DSO).

Sent to the Baltic Sea as part of a British flotilla, Horton sank a number of merchant vessels and, on 2 July 1915, damaged the German armoured cruiser SMS Prinz Adalbert. On 31 December 1914, Horton was promoted to Commander.

In 1917, Horton was awarded the bar to his DSO for long and arduous services in command of overseas submarines. Three years later, as a captain, he was awarded a second bar to his DSO for distinguished service in command of the Baltic submarine flotilla.

== Interbellum ==
During the 1920s, Horton served as captain of HMS Conquest and of the battleship HMS Resolution. Promoted to rear admiral on 17 October 1932, he became Commander of the 2nd Battle Squadron with his flag in the battleship HMS Malaya in December 1933 and Commander of the 1st Cruiser Squadron with his flag in HMS London in 1935. Promoted to vice admiral in 1937, he was given command of the Reserve Fleet that year.

As Vice-Admiral Commanding Reserve Fleet, he flew his flag in HMS Hawkins (a cruiser), and HMS Effingham (cruiser) from 24.06.1938.

== Second World War ==
=== Commander, Northern Patrol ===
With the onset of World War II, Horton was put in command of the Northern Patrol enforcing the distant maritime blockade of Germany in the seas between Orkney and the Faroes. In 1940, he was made Rear Admiral Submarines. In the opinion of Horton's biographer, Rear Admiral William Scott Chalmers, a new regulation which required the post holder to be an officer who had served aboard submarines in the Great War, was forced through for the sole purpose of ensuring that Horton was on a very short list of qualifiers for this post, almost ensuring his rapid transfer to Aberdour, so great was the desire of some within the Admiralty to have Horton revitalize the submarine arm.

Horton moved his headquarters from Aberdour, where he was under the control of the fleet commanders at Scapa Flow, to Northways in north London, officially because he wanted a freer hand in running his command, but purportedly because Northways was located near some of his favourite golf courses. Horton, an avid golfer, is said to have played a round of golf almost every day during the war (since most of the convoy battles took place at night), and was generously handicapped at a "financial 8".

He was responsible for the creation of convoy rescue ships, which accompanied some Atlantic convoys to rescue survivors from ships sunk by enemy action. Rescue ships were typically small freighters with passenger accommodations. Conversion to rescue service involved enlarging galley and food storage areas and providing berthing and sanitary facilities for approximately 150 men. The ships carried scrambling nets along the sides, and boats suitable for open sea work instead of normal lifeboats. Rescue ships normally included a small operating room for an embarked naval doctor and sick bay staff.

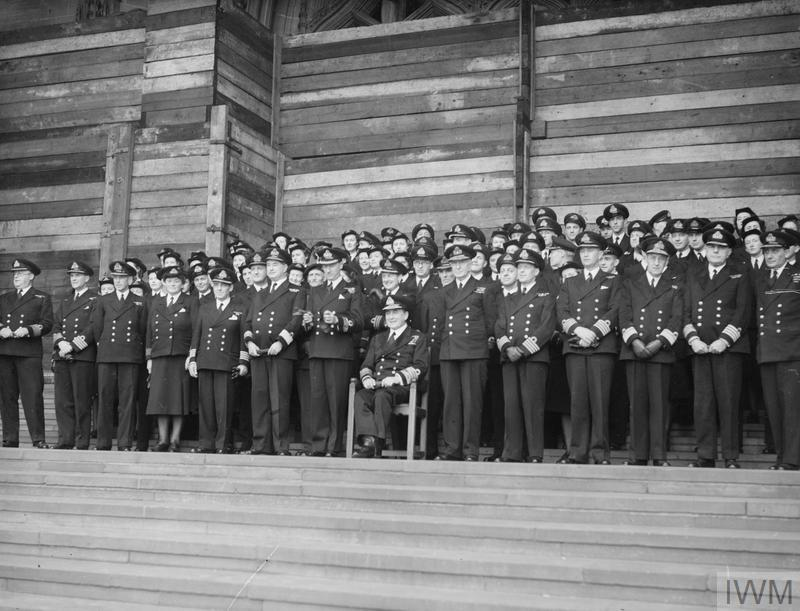
Max Horton with his naval officers, 10 June 1945

=== Commander-in-Chief, Western Approaches ===
Having been promoted to full Admiral on 9 January 1941, Horton was appointed Commander-in-Chief, Western Approaches Command on 17 November 1942.

He instituted a series of tactical changes in the way the escort ships were to be used. In addition to the existing escort group system, in which groups of ships were assigned to defend the perimeter of convoy boxes, Horton instituted a system of support groups, who would also travel with the convoys, but have much more freedom in pursuing submarines to the death, even if such action necessitated leaving the convoy for longer periods of time than were considered acceptable for escort groups. Horton's support groups proved to be decisive in the crucial spring of 1943, taking the battle to the U-boats and crushing the morale of the U-boat arm with persistent and successful counterattacks.

Horton is widely credited, along with his predecessor, Admiral Sir Percy Noble, as having been one of the most crucial figures in the Allied victory in the Atlantic.

=== Retiremement ===
In August 1945, Max Horton, at his own request, was placed on the retired list in order to facilitate the promotion of younger officers.

=== Recognition ===
Horton was made a Knight Grand Cross of the Order of the Bath in June 1945 and was Bath King of Arms from January 1946. He was awarded the Freedom of the City of Liverpool.

== Death ==
Horton died of coronary thrombosis.

== Memorials ==
There is a memorial to him in Liverpool Cathedral.

In 2019, a full size sculpture of Horton was funded by the Rhosneigr community and placed in Rhosneigr, where he was born.

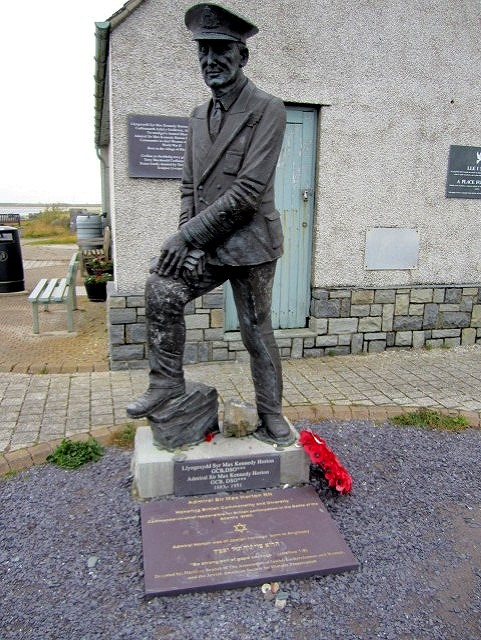
Memorial to Sir Max Horton

In 2021 a footstone was funded by the Jewish American Society for Historic Preservation in his honour. The footstone reads, "Admiral Sir Max Horton, RN, Honouring British Commonality and Diversity, Commander-in-Chief responsible for British participation in the Battle of the Atlantic WWII. Admiral Horton was of Jewish heritage born in Anglesey. 'Be strong and of good courage' Joshua 1:9, Donated by the Hackney Branch of the Association of Jewish Ex-Servicemen and Women and the Jewish American Society for Historic Preservation."

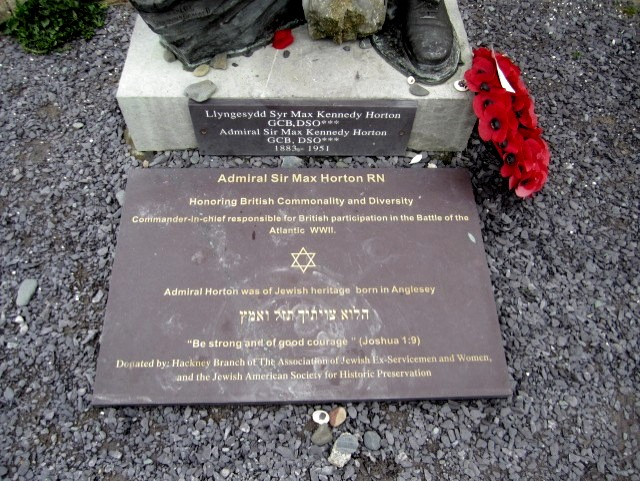
Dedication marker for Sir Max Horton

An anti-submarine trawler, HMS Commander Horton, was sunk on 27 April 1941 by German submarine U-552.

== Honours and awards ==
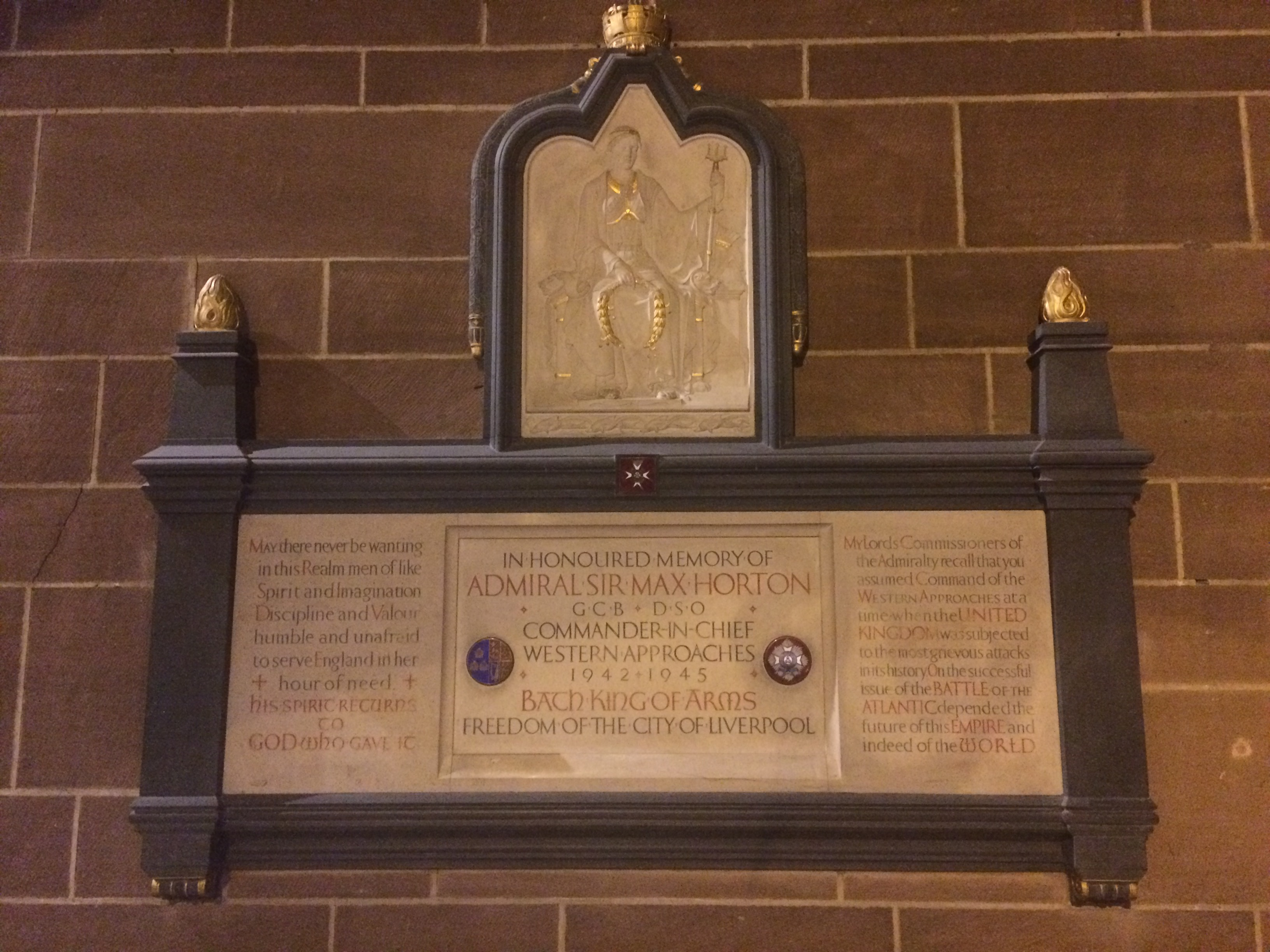
Admiral Sir Max Horton memorial at Liverpool Cathedral

- Knight Grand Cross of the Order of the Bath (14 June 1945, King's Birthday Honours); KCB (2 January 1939, New Year Honours); CB (4 June 1934, Birthday Honours)
- Distinguished Service Order and two bars (21 October 1914, highly successful attacks on German men-of-war; 2 November 1917, for long and arduous services in command of overseas submarines; 8 March 1920, distinguished service in command of the Baltic submarine flotilla)
- Mention in Despatches (11 July 1940)
- The Board of Trade Medal for Saving Life at Sea in silver (1911)
- Order of St. George, 4th Class (Russia) (LG 15 November 1915)
- Grand Officer of the Legion of Honour (France)
- Croix de Guerre with Palmes (France)
- Order of St. Vladimir 4th Class with swords (Russia)
- Order of St. Anna, 2nd Class with swords and diamonds (Russia)
- Order of St. Stanislaus 2nd Class
- Grand Cross of the Order of Orange-Nassau (Netherlands, 12 May 1942)
- Chief Commander of Legion of Merit (USA, 28 May 1946)
- Grand Cross of the Order of St. Olaf (Norway, 13 January 1948; services to Norway)

== Sources ==
- Chalmers, William (1954). Max Horton and the Western Approaches: A biography of Admiral Sir Max Kennedy Horton. Hodder & Stoughton.

Military offices
Preceded by Sir Gerald Dickens	Commander-in-Chief, Reserve Fleet; 1937–1939	Succeeded by Post Disbanded
Preceded by Bertram Watson	Rear-Admiral Submarines; 1940–1942	Succeeded by Claud Barry
Heraldic offices
Preceded by Sir Walter Braithwaite	King of Arms of the Order of the Bath; 1946–1951	Succeeded by Sir James Robb
