= John Grant (Royal Navy officer) =

Senior Royal Navy officer

Rear-Admiral John Grant CB DSO
- Born: 13 October 1908
- Died: 28 February 1996 (aged 87)
- Military career
- Allegiance: United Kingdom
- Branch: Royal Navy
- Service years: 1926–1960
- Rank: Rear-Admiral
- Commands: HMS Beverley; HMS Philante; HMS Opportune; HMS Fame; HMS Crispin; HMS Cleopatra; HMS Vernon; Reserve Fleet
- Conflicts: World War II
- Awards: Companion of the Order of the Bath; Distinguished Service Order

Rear-Admiral John Grant CB DSO (13 October 1908 – 28 February 1996) was a senior Royal Navy officer who commanded the Reserve Fleet.

== Naval career ==
Grant joined the Royal Navy as a midshipman in the battleship HMS Queen Elizabeth in 1926. He specialised in anti-submarine warfare and saw service in the Atlantic, Arctic and Mediterranean during World War II. He became staff officer for convoys at Rosyth in 1940 and then commanded the destroyer HMS Beverley from 1941 before being posted to the anti-submarine warfare training school, HMS Osprey, in a training role from 1942. He briefly commanded the yacht HMS Philante in 1943 and then became Assistant Staff Officer for Operations at Headquarters Western Approaches later that year.

After the War he commanded the destroyer HMS Opportune, the destroyer HMS Fame and then the destroyer HMS Crispin. After attending the Joint Services Staff College in 1947 he became executive officer at the torpedo school HMS Vernon in 1948 and deputy director of Torpedo at the Anti-Submarine and Mine Warfare Division of the Admiralty in 1949. He went on to be commanding officer of the cruiser HMS Cleopatra in 1952 and after attending Imperial Defence College in 1954, became Commander of HMS Vernon in 1955. He joined the staff of the Chief of the Defence Staff at the Ministry of Defence in 1957. Promoted to rear-admiral on 7 January 1959, he became Flag Officer commanding the Reserve Fleet in 1959 before retiring in 1960.

Military offices
Preceded by Sir Guy Sayer	Commander-in-Chief, Reserve Fleet; 1959–1960	Succeeded by Post Disbanded
