= Edmond Hyde Parker =

Royal Navy Admiral (1868–1951)

Admiral Edmond Hyde Parker, CB (30 January 1868 – 19 August 1951) was a Royal Navy officer.

== Life and career ==
The son of Sir William Parker, 9th Baronet, Parker came from a family with strong naval connections over five generations. His grandfather was Vice-Admiral Hyde Parker, First Naval Lord from 1852 to 1854; his great-grandfather was Admiral Sir Hyde Parker, and his great-great-grandfather was Vice-Admiral Sir Hyde Parker, 5th Baronet. An uncle, Captain Hyde Parker (1824–1854) was killed storming Russian batteries in the Sulina Channel during the Crimean War.

Parker entered HMS Britannia in July 1881, was promoted to lieutenant in 1891, and to commander in 1901. He commanded the torpedo boat destroyer HMS Ardent from 1897 to 1899, coming under regular fire from insurgents on shore when she was serving off the coast of Crete. Promoted to captain in 1906, he briefly commanded the battleship HMS Empress of India in 1907, before being appointed in command of the cruiser of HMS Niobe, the flagship of Rear-Admiral Harry S. F. Niblett, Rear-Admiral Commanding, Devonport Division, Home Fleet. In 1910, he was appointed to command the protected cruiser HMS Minerva, and in 1913 to the command of the first-class protected cruiser HMS Endymion.

After paying off Endymion in November 1914, Parker was appointed Captain of the Royal Naval College, Dartmouth in December 1914. In February 1915 he was given command of the battleship HMS Superb in the Grand Fleet, participating in the Battle of Jutland in 1906: Superb scored several hits against the crippled light cruiser SMS Wiesbaden, and received no damage. Parker was appointed an aide-de-camp to the King in August 1917, promoted to rear-admiral on 23 October 1917, and appointed a Companion of the Order of the Bath (CB) in 1918.

After the war, Hyde served as Director of Naval Mobilisation from 1918 to 1919.

He was promoted to vice-admiral on 25 March 1923, and was placed on the retired list on the following day. Four years later he was advanced to the rank of admiral on the retired list on 1 August 1927.
