= Henry McCall =

Royal Navy Admiral (1895–1980)

Admiral Sir Henry McCall KCVO KBE CB DSO
- Born: 11 June 1895; Largs, Scotland
- Died: 23 March 1980 (aged 84); Wonston, England
- Military career
- Allegiance: United Kingdom
- Branch: Royal Navy
- Service years: 1908–1953
- Rank: Admiral
- Commands: Reserve Fleet (1951–1953); Destroyers in the Mediterranean Fleet (1949–1950); HMS Howe (1944–1946); HMS Dido (1940–1942); HMS Achates (1932–1934)
- Conflicts: First World War; Second World War
- Awards: Knight Commander of the Royal Victorian Order; Knight Commander of the Order of the British Empire; Companion of the Order of the Bath; Distinguished Service Order; Mentioned in Despatches; Legion of Merit (United States)

Admiral Sir Henry William Urquhart McCall (11 June 1895 – 23 March 1980) was a senior Royal Navy officer who commanded the Reserve Fleet from 1951 until his retirement in 1953.

== Naval career ==
McCall joined the Royal Navy as midshipman in the cruiser HMS Hyacinth at the Cape of Good Hope in 1908. He served in the First World War as sub-lieutenant in the steamship HMS Daffodil from 1915, as Executive Officer in the destroyer HMS Nepean in the Grand Fleet from 1916 and as First Lieutenant in the destroyer HMS Westcott in the Grand Fleet from 1918. He was present at the Scuttling of the German fleet at Scapa Flow in 1919. He became commanding officer of the destroyer HMS Achates in the Mediterranean Fleet in 1932 and naval attaché at Buenos Aires in Argentina in 1938.

McCall served in the Second World War as commanding officer of the cruiser HMS Dido from 1940, as Chief of Staff to Admiral Sir Percy Noble who was Head of the British Naval Delegation to Washington, D.C., from 1943, and as commanding officer of the battleship HMS Howe in South East Asia in 1944.

McCall became Senior British Naval Officer in the Middle East in 1946, Flag Officer, Destroyers, in the Mediterranean Fleet in 1949 and Vice Admiral commanding the Reserve Fleet 1950, before retiring with the rank of admiral on 15 September 1953.

Military offices
Preceded by Sir Robin Bridge	Commander-in-Chief, Reserve Fleet; 1951–1953	Succeeded by Sir Ian Campbell
