= Rudolf Burmester =

Royal Navy Admiral (1875–1956)

Admiral Sir Rudolf Burmester KBE CB CMG
- Burmester in 1931
- Born: 11 November 1875; Surrey, England
- Died: 27 December 1956 (aged 81)
- Military career
- Allegiance: United Kingdom
- Branch: Royal Navy
- Rank: Admiral
- Commands: HMS Euryalus; HMS Victory; HMS Warspite; Africa Station
- Conflicts: World War I World War II
- Awards: Knight Commander of the Order of the British Empire; Companion of the Order of the Bath; Companion of the Order of St Michael and St George; Légion d'Honneur; Order of the Rising Sun

Admiral Sir Rudolf Miles Burmester, KBE, CB, CMG (11 November 1875 – 27 December 1956) was a Royal Navy officer who went on to be Commander-in-Chief, Africa Station.

== Naval career ==
Burmester joined the Royal Navy in 1890. He was promoted to lieutenant in 1897, and in July 1902 posted as a gunnery officer to the protected cruiser HMS Highflyer, flagship of the Commander-in-Chief, East Indies Station. He served in World War I and, having been promoted to captain in June 1914, commanded HMS Euryalus at Galipolli in 1915 for which he was mentioned in despatches. He served as Chief of Staff to the Commander-in-Chief of the Mediterranean Fleet in the closing stages of the War.

In 1922 he was appointed Commanding Officer of HMS Victory and in 1923 he was appointed Commanding Officer of HMS Warspite. He was promoted to rear admiral in 1924. Between 1926 and 1928 he was Director of the Naval Mobilisation Department. He was appointed Commander-in-Chief, Africa Station in 1929.

He was promoted to full admiral on 30 September 1933.

He also served in World War II as Commander of Naval Forces based in the Swansea area.

He lived at The Elms in Thames Ditton.

== Family ==
In 1907 he married Marjorie Gladys Lloyd.

Military offices
Preceded by Sir David Anderson	Commander-in-Chief, Africa Station; 1929–1931	Succeeded by Sir Hugh Tweedie
