= Naval Mobilisation Department =

Department of the British Admiralty

Department overview
- Formed: 1909, reformed-1918
- Preceding Department: Naval Intelligence Department
- Dissolved: 1912, 1932
- Superseding Department: Mobilisation Division (1st), Department of the Director of Manning (2nd)
- Jurisdiction: Government of the United Kingdom
- Headquarters: Admiralty Building Whitehall London
- Parent department: Admiralty

The Naval Mobilisation Department also known as the Mobilisation and Movements Department was a former department of the British Admiralty initially from 1909 to 1912 and then again from 1918 to 1932. It was mainly responsible for plans, mobilisation and manning during the pre-World War I and post war period.

== History ==
In 1909, following restructuring within the Admiralty, both the Mobilisation and War Divisions of the Naval Intelligence Department were brought together to create a separate Naval Mobilisation Department however this department existed only for a period of three years. In 1912 it was abolished and its functions became a component part of the Admiralty War Staff sub staff divisions. In 1918 the Mobilisation Division of the Admiralty Naval Staff itself was dissolved and the Mobilisation Department was re-stablished once again but not under the control of the Naval Staff instead it was responsible to the Office of the Second Sea Lord this lasted until 1932 when it was replaced by a new Department of the Director of Manning that was itself a subsidiary department of the Second Sea Lord it continued to exist until 1964 when the Admiralty Department itself was abolished.

== Directors of Naval Mobilisation ==
Directors of Naval Mobilisation, 1909-1912

- Rear-Admiral Herbert G. King-Hall, 11 October 1909 - September 1911.
- Captain Alexander L. Duff, October, 1911 - 1912.

Directors of Naval Mobilisation, 1918-1932

- Rear-Admiral Edmond Hyde Parker, September 1918-December 1920.
- Rear-Admiral George H.Baird, January 1921-January 1923.
- Rear-Admiral John W. L. McClintock, January 1923-December 1924.
- Rear-Admiral Robert N. Bax, December 1924-December 1926.
- Rear-Admiral Rudolf M. Burmester, December 1926-December 1928.
- Rear-Admiral Edward Astley-Rushton, December 1928-December 1930.
- Rear-Admiral the Hon. Reginald Drax, December 1930-March 1932.

== Assistant Directors ==
Assistant Directors of Naval Mobilisation, 1909-1912 Heads of Manning Division, 1909-1912

- Captain Michael Culme-Seymour, October, 1909 - October 1910.
- Captain Osmond de B. Brock, November, 1910 - 1912.

Heads of War Division, 1909-1912

- Captain George C. Cayley, October, 1909 - December 1909
- Captain Sydney R. Fremantle, January, 1910 - February 1911.
- Captain George P. W. Hope, March, 1911 - 1912.

Assistant Directors of Naval Mobilisation, 1918-1932

- Captain George W. McO. Campbell, April, 1918 – April, 1924.
- Captain Roger L'E. M. Rede, April, 1924 – 4 April 1932.

== Divisions and sub-sections ==
As of 1911: Distribution of work between the departments two divisions various sections can be seen in more detail below they included:

Manning Division

Section	Admiralty Room	Responsibility
HMD	18 (III.)	The head of division is responsible for general superintendence of work of Manning Division, and preparation of Sketch Vote "A."
1	19 (III.)	Admiralty Representative on Navy Employment Agency, Alterations in "Instructions for Mobilisation, Control of Railway Traffic in time of War (War Railway Council), Manning requirements and resources, Mobilisation arrangements as regards Personnel of Fleet, Mobilisation questions raised by the Mobilising Committees at the Ports, Preparation for Peace Manœuvres (as regards subjects dealt with by Section 1).
2	19 (III.)	Auxiliary requirements of the Home Ports for War (Personnel), Complement Committee questions, Monthly Mobilising List of Officers, Preparation for Peace Manœuvres (as regards subjects dealt with by Section 2).

War Division

Section	Admiralty Room	Responsibility
HWD	32 (III.)	The head of division is responsible for general superintendence of work of War Division, Orders for War issued by the Admiralty and by Commanders-in-Chief.
3	31 (III.)	Arrangements for War Room., Auxiliary requirements at Home Ports, Correction of Standing Orders for Foreign Stations, General distribution of British Fleet in Commission and Reserve, and preparation of Monthly "War Fleet" and Quarterly Return, Questions relating to Torpedo Craft and Submarines, Mine-sweeping and Minelaying, War College, Signal Books, Supply of Provisions in War, and Naval Stores other than Coal and Oil, Preparation for and Reports on British Naval Manœuvres and Exercises, Reserves of Ordnance Stores.
4	31 (III.)	Distribution of Naval Intelligence in United Kingdom, Fleet Auxiliaries: Arrangements for an Instructions regarding. Questions relating to Fleet Coaling Service in War and Manœuvres, Supply of Oil Fuel, Wireless Telegraphy, Examination Service and Traffic Regulations, and Joint Naval and Military Operations, Preparation of Annual Statement of Coal and Oil Fuel requirements of the War Fleets with resources and proposed methods of supply, War Signal Stations and Coast Guard Stations.

== Attribution ==
Primary source for this article is by Harley Simon, Lovell Tony, (2015), Naval Mobilisation Department (Royal Navy), dreadnoughtproject.org, http://www.dreadnoughtproject.org.

== Sources ==
- CB1515(50) [later OU 6171/31] The Technical History and Index (Part 50): Mobilisation of the Fleet. Demobilisation Records, 1918–19, written by the Mobilisation Department of the Admiralty, January 1921.
- Rodger. N.A.M., (1979) The Admiralty (offices of state), T. Dalton, Lavenham, ISBN 978-0900963940.
- Hamilton C. I. (2011) The Making of the Modern Admiralty: British Naval Policy-Making, 1805–1927, Cambridge Military Histories, Cambridge University Press, ISBN 978-1139496544
