= Eclipse-class cruiser =

1897 class of British cruisers

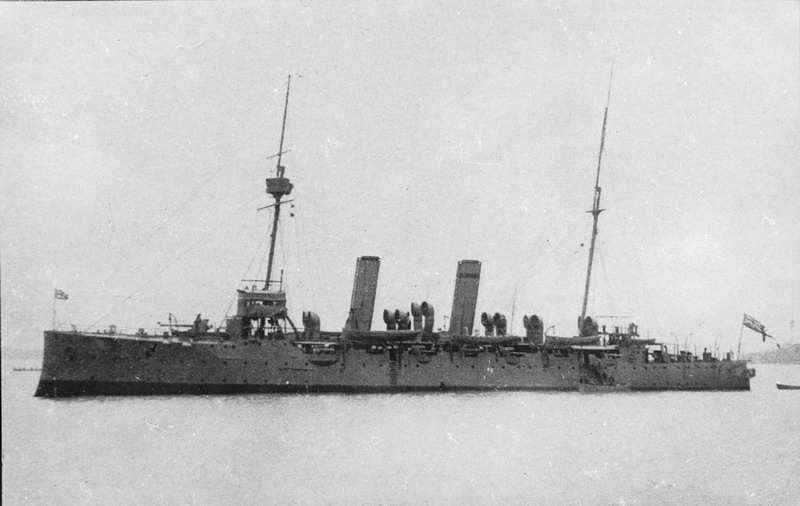
- HMS Talbot

Class overview
- Name: Eclipse class
- Operators: Royal Navy
- Preceded by: Astraea class
- Succeeded by: Arrogant class
- Built: 1893–1898
- In commission: 1897–1921
- Completed: 9
- Scrapped: 9

General characteristics
- Type: Protected cruiser
- Displacement: 5,600 long tons (5,690 t)
- Length: 350 ft (106.7 m)
- Beam: 53 ft 6 in (16.3 m)
- Draught: 20 ft 6 in (6.25 m)
- Installed power: 9,600 ihp (7,200 kW); 8 cylindrical boilers
- Propulsion: 2 shafts, 2 Inverted triple-expansion steam engines
- Speed: 18.5 knots (34.3 km/h; 21.3 mph)
- Complement: 450
- Armament: As built: 5 × QF 6-inch (152 mm) guns; 6 × QF 4.7-inch (120 mm) guns; 8 × QF 12-pounder (3 inch, 76.2 mm) guns; 6 × QF 3-pounder (47 mm) guns; 3 × 18-inch (450 mm) torpedo tubes; After 1905: 11 × QF 6-inch guns; 9 × QF 12-pounder guns; 7 × QF 3-pounder guns; 3 × 18-inch torpedo tubes
- Armour: Gun shields: 3 in (76 mm); Engine hatch: 6 in (152 mm); Decks: 1.5–3 in (38–76 mm); Conning tower: 6 in (152 mm)

The Eclipse-class cruisers were a class of nine second-class protected cruisers constructed for the Royal Navy in the mid-1890s.

== Design and description ==
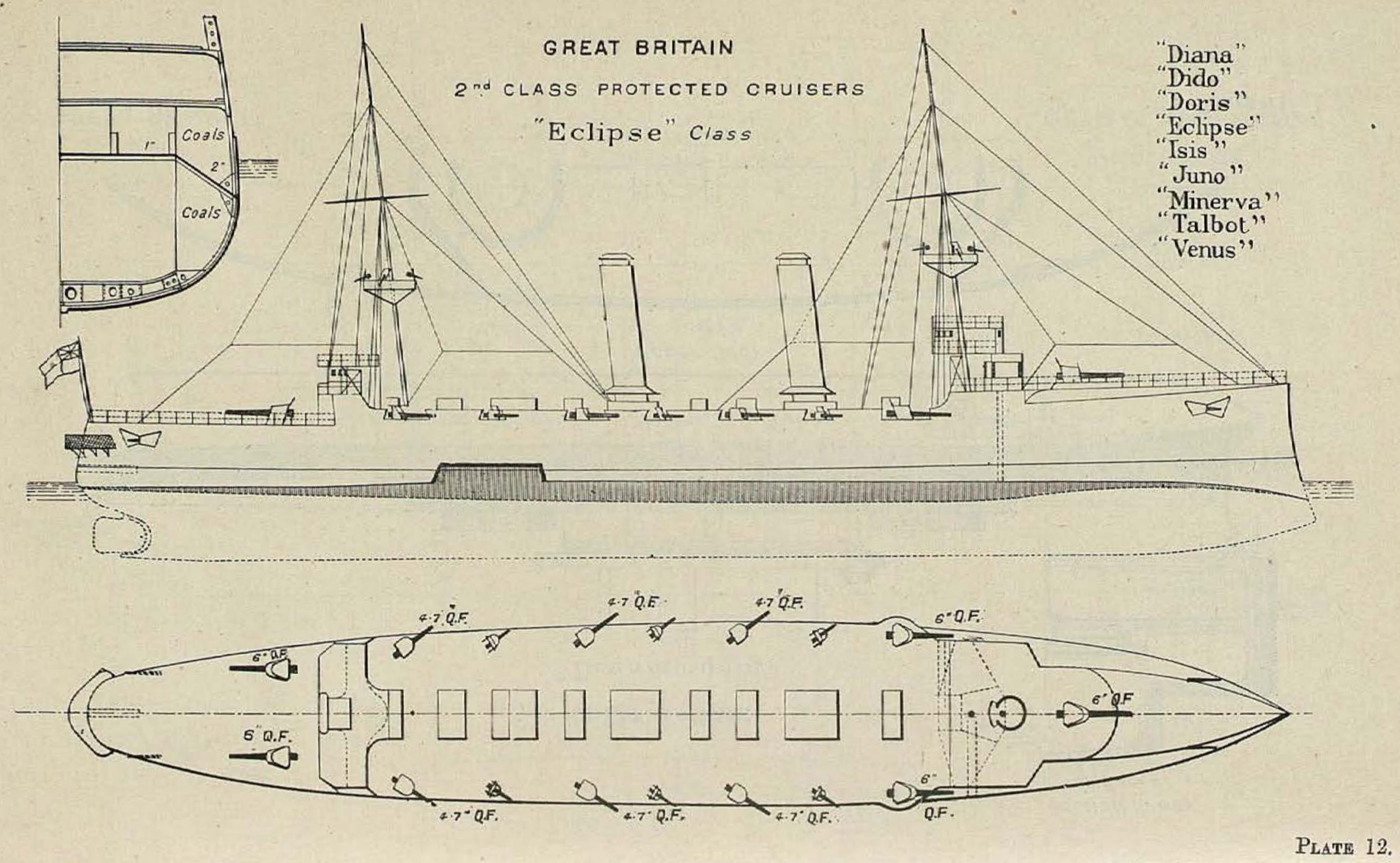
Right elevation, deck plan and hull section as depicted in Brassey's Naval Annual 1896

These ships were enlarged and improved versions of the preceding Astraea class. The Eclipse-class ships were 373 feet (113.7 m) long overall, had a beam of 53 feet 6 inches (16.31 m) and a draught of 20 feet 6 inches (6.2 m). They displaced 5,600 long tons (5,700 t) at normal load. To reduce biofouling, the hulls of the ships were sheathed with wood and copper. Their crew consisted of 450 officers and enlisted men. Their metacentric height was approximately 3 feet (0.9 m).

The Eclipse-class ships were powered by two inverted triple-expansion steam engines using steam generated by eight cylindrical boilers at a pressure of 155 psi (1,069 kPa; 11 kgf/cm^{2}). Using normal draught, the boilers were intended to provide the engines with enough steam to generate 8,000 indicated horsepower (6,000 kW) and to reach a speed of 18.5 knots (34.3 km/h; 21.3 mph); using forced draft, the equivalent figures were 9,600 indicated horsepower (7,200 kW) and a speed of 19.5 knots (36.1 km/h; 22.4 mph). During their sea trials, all of the lightly loaded ships exceeded their specifications and reached a top speed of 20 knots (37 km/h; 23 mph). They carried a maximum of 1,075 long tons (1,092 t) of coal.

The ships carried five 40-calibre 6-inch (152 mm) quick-firing (QF) guns in single mounts protected by gun shields. One gun was mounted on the forecastle, two on the quarterdeck and one pair was abreast the bridge. They fired 100-pound (45 kg) shells at a muzzle velocity of 2,205 ft/s (672 m/s). The secondary armament consisted of six 40-calibre 4.7-inch (120 mm) guns; three on each broadside. Their 45-pound (20.4 kg) shells were fired at a muzzle velocity of 2,125 ft/s (648 m/s).

Defense against torpedo boats was provided by eight QF 12-pounder 12 cwt (Note: "Cwt" is the abbreviation for hundredweight, 12 cwt referring to the weight of the gun.) guns and six 47-millimetre (1.9 in) three-pounder Hotchkiss guns. Four of the 12-pounders were mounted in the sides of the hull fore and aft while the remaining four guns were interspersed between the 4.7-inch guns. The three-pounders were mounted in the fighting tops, three in each one. The 12-pounders fired 3-inch (76 mm), 12.5-pound (5.7 kg) projectiles at a muzzle velocity of 2,359 ft/s (719 m/s). The ships also equipped with three 18-inch torpedo tubes, one submerged tube on each broadside and one above water in the stern. The ammunition supply consisted of 200 six-inch rounds per gun, 250 shells for each 4.7-inch gun, 300 rounds per gun for the 12-pounders and 500 for each three-pounder. Each ship also carried ten torpedoes, presumably four for each broadside tube and two for the stern tube.

Between 1903 and 1905, all of the ships in the class except for Eclipse had their mixed armament replaced with a more uniform armament of eleven 6-inch, nine 12-pounders and seven 3-pounder guns.

The primary protection of the Eclipse class was its sloping armoured deck. This ranged in thickness from 1.5 to 3 inches (38 to 76 mm), with its slopes being 2.5 inches (64 mm) thick. It covered an area six inches above the waterline to 5 feet (1.5 m) below it. The engines were protected by a six-inch armoured hatch that extended above the armoured deck. The gun shields for the six-inch guns were three inches thick and the conning tower's armour was six inches thick.

== Ships ==
Name	Shipyard	Laid down	Launched	Completed	Fate
Eclipse	Portsmouth Dockyard	11 December 1893	19 July 1894	23 March 1897	Sold for scrap, August 1921
Diana	Fairfield Shipbuilding & Engineering, Govan	13 August 1894	5 December 1895	15 June 1897	Sold for scrap, 1 July 1920
Dido	London & Glasgow Shipbuilding, Govan	30 August 1894	20 March 1896	10 May 1898	Sold for scrap, 16 December 1926
Doris	Naval Construction & Armaments Co., Barrow-in-Furness	29 August 1894	3 March 1896	18 November 1897	Sold for scrap, 2 February 1919
Isis	London & Glasgow Engineering, Govan	30 January 1895	27 June 1896	10 May 1898	Sold for scrap, 26 February 1920
Juno	Naval Construction & Armaments Co., Barrow	22 June 1895	18 November 1895	16 June 1897	Sold for scrap, 26 February 1920
Minerva	Chatham Dockyard	4 December 1893	23 September 1895	4 February 1897	Sold for scrap, 5 October 1920
Talbot	Devonport Dockyard	5 March 1894	25 April 1895	15 September 1896	Sold for scrap, 6 December 1921
Venus	Fairfield Shipbuilding & Engineering	28 June 1894	5 September 1895	9 November 1897	Sold for scrap, 22 September 1921
