= James Troup =

Vice-Admiral Sir James Troup KBE CB
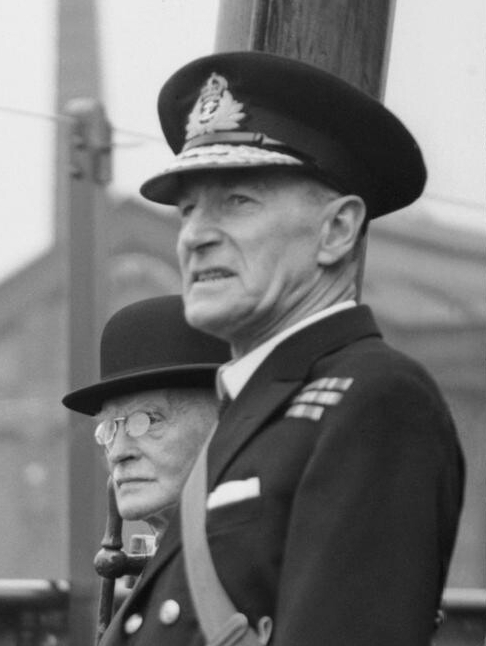
- Troup in 1942
- Born: 7 March 1883
- Died: 11 May 1975 (aged 92)
- Military career
- Allegiance: United Kingdom
- Branch: Royal Navy
- Rank: Vice-Admiral
- Commands: HMS Cairo; HMS Revenge
- Conflicts: First World War
- Awards: Knight Commander of the Order of the British Empire; Companion of the Order of the Bath

Vice-Admiral Sir James Andrew Gardiner Troup, KBE, CB (7 March 1883 – 11 May 1975) was a Royal Navy officer.

== Early life ==
Troup was the son of the Rev G. E. Troup of Broughty Ferry and was educated at the High School of Dundee.

== Naval career ==
Troup competed for a cadetship in the Royal Navy in 1897. He saw action in the second Boer War on the cruiser HMS Terrible, and would later take part in the Boxer War. After serving with the Grand Fleet in the First World War, he became Master of the Fleet in 1920. Following promotion to captain on 31 December 1922, he became Head of the Tactical Section of the Naval Staff at the Admiralty in 1923. He was given command of the cruiser HMS Cairo in November 1926 and of the battleship HMS Revenge in June 1930.

He went on to be Captain of the School of Maritime Operations in December 1928, Flag Captain on the battleship HMS Revenge & Chief Staff Officer to Vice-Admiral Commanding 1st Battle Squadron in 1930. After that he became Director of the Tactical School at HMNB Portsmouth in 1933, and having been being promoted to rear-admiral on 16 January 1935, he became Director of Naval Intelligence in July 1935. His final appointment was as Flag Officer-in-charge, Glasgow and District Shipyard Controller from 1940 to 1946.

Troup was appointed a Companion of the Order of the Bath in the 1936 New Year Honours and advanced to Knight Commander of the Order of the Bath in the 1943 New Year Honours. He was appointed to the Order of Polonia Restituta Second Class by the President of Poland on 22 August 1944, to the rank of commander in the Legion of Merit by the President of the United States in 1946 and to the rank of commander in the Legion of Honour by the President of France in 1946.

Military offices
Preceded by Gerald Dickens	Director of Naval Intelligence; 1935–1939	Succeeded by John Godfrey
