= HMS Resource (F79) =

- Resource in 1932

History

United Kingdom
- Name: HMS Resource
- Ordered: 16 February 1927
- Builder: Vickers-Armstrongs, Barrow-in-Furness
- Laid down: August 1927
- Launched: 27 November 1928
- Motto: Passim Ut Orim: 'Everywhere as of yore'
- Nickname(s): Remorse
- Fate: Scrapped from February 1954
- Badge: On a Field Blue, a Sea-Unicorn Silver horned Gold.

General characteristics
- Type: Repair ship
- Displacement: 12,300 tons
- Length: 530 ft (160 m)
- Beam: 83 ft (25 m)
- Draught: 22 ft 4 in (6.81 m)
- Propulsion: 4 × three-drum Admiralty boilers; Two shafts with shaft horsepower of 7,500
- Speed: 15 knots (28 km/h)
- Complement: 581 (peacetime)
- Armament: 4 × 4 in AA guns

HMS Resource was a fleet repair ship of the Royal Navy. She was built by Vickers-Armstrongs and launched in 1928. The ship served in two theatres during the Second World War.

Resource was fitted with four three-drum Admiralty boilers, giving her a top speed of 15 knots (28 km/h). She was armed with four 4" guns. Her complement varied throughout her career, from a peacetime complement of 581, rising in wartime. She displaced 12,300 tons.

She served in the Mediterranean from 1939 until 1944, except in early 1940 when she spent a small amount of time at Freetown. She served in the Eastern Fleet from 1944, and was scrapped at Inverkeithing in February 1954.

Resource was given the nickname "Remorse" by her crew, with Don H. Kennedy commenting that "the repair ship Resource became the despair ship Remorse".
