= Charles Harris (Royal Navy officer) =

British admiral

Rear-Admiral Charles Harris CB
- Born: 2 January 1887; Shortlands, Kent, England
- Died: 2 March 1957 (aged 70); Micheldever, Hampshire
- Military career
- Allegiance: United Kingdom
- Branch: Royal Navy
- Service years: 1902–1945
- Rank: Rear-Admiral
- Commands: HMS Badger; Reserve Fleet
- Conflicts: World War I World War II
- Awards: Companion of the Order of the Bath

Rear-Admiral Charles Frederick Harris CB (2 January 1887 – 2 March 1957) was Flag Officer commanding the Reserve Fleet.

== Naval career ==
Harris joined the Royal Navy in 1902, and was promoted to the rank of sub-lieutenant in the Royal Navy on 30 August 1906. He served as a lieutenant-commander in World War I. He became Director, Naval Air Division in 1934 and then served in World War II, initially as Flag Officer in command of the shore establishment Badger and then as Flag Officer commanding the Reserve Fleet from 1944 before retiring in 1945. He was appointed a Companion of the Order of the Bath on 1 January 1945.
