= William Napier (Royal Navy officer) =

Royal Navy Admiral (1877–1951)

Admiral William Napier CB CMG DSO
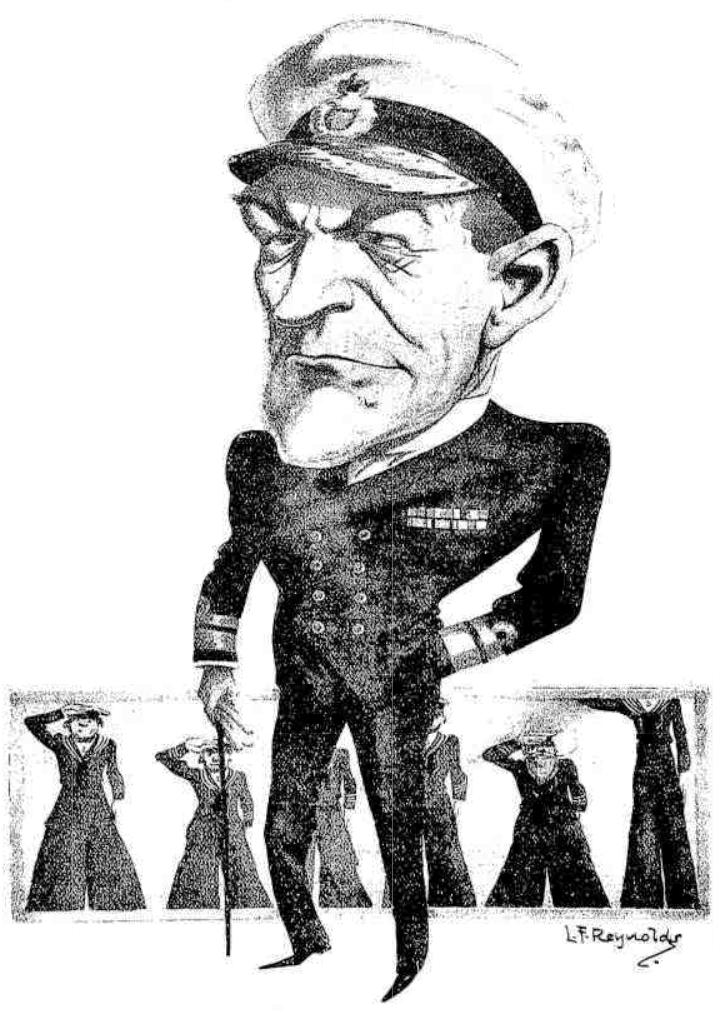
- 1926 caricature by Reynolds
- Born: 13 June 1877; Southsea, Hampshire
- Died: 8 April 1951 (aged 73); Fareham, Hampshire
- Military career
- Allegiance: United Kingdom
- Branch: Royal Navy
- Service years: 1887–1929
- Rank: Admiral
- Commands: Chief of the Australian Naval Staff (1926–29); HMS Vernon (1924); HMS Royal Sovereign (1922–24); HMS Castor (1920; HMS Coventry (1919–20); HMS Buttercup (1916); HMS Sir Thomas Picton (1915–16); HMS Thames (1909–11); HMS Vesuvius (1906–08)
- Conflicts: First World War
- Awards: Companion of the Order of the Bath; Companion of the Order of St Michael and St George; Distinguished Service Order; Mentioned in Despatches

Admiral William Rawdon Napier, CB, CMG, DSO (13 June 1877 – 8 April 1951) was a Royal Navy officer who served as First Naval Member and Chief of the Australian Naval Staff from 1926 to 1929.

== Naval service ==
Napier joined the Royal Navy as a naval cadet in January 1891. He was promoted to lieutenant on 15 January 1898. From 25 July 1902 he was posted to the cruiser HMS St George, serving in the Cruiser squadron, before becoming torpedo officer (T) in the cruiser HMS Good Hope when it commissioned for service in the Atlantic Fleet in November 1902.

He served during the First World War and was mentioned in despatches for his service in the Gallipoli campaign and awarded the Distinguished Service Order for minesweeping operations. He was appointed First Naval Member and Chief of the Australian Naval Staff in 1926; promoted vice-admiral on 31 July 1929 and retired the following day.

He was promoted to full admiral on the Retired list in 1933. He died at his home in Fareham in Hampshire in 1951.

Military offices
Preceded by Rear Admiral Percival Hall-Thompson	Chief of the Australian Naval Staff; 1926–1929	Succeeded by Vice Admiral Sir William Kerr
