= HMS Eclipse (1894) =

Eclipse-class cruiser

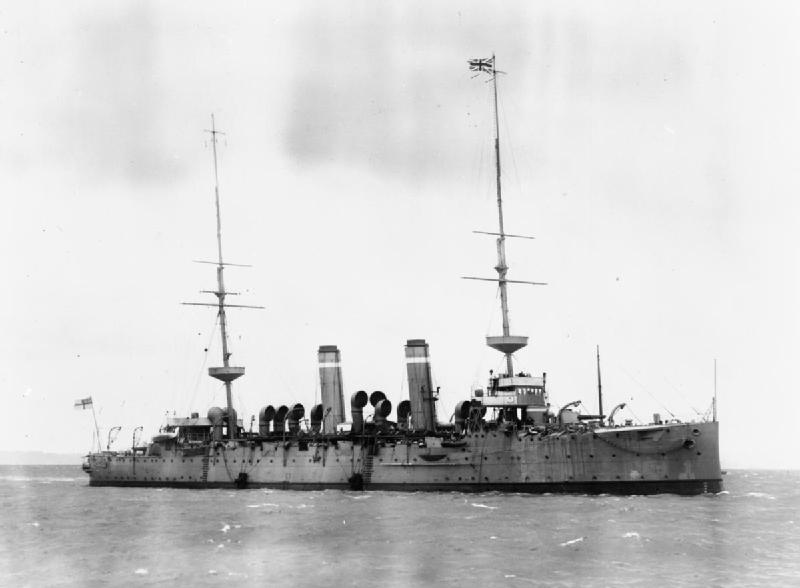
- Eclipse during World War I

History

United Kingdom
- Name: HMS Eclipse
- Builder: Portsmouth Dockyard
- Laid down: 11 December 1893
- Launched: 19 July 1894
- Completed: 23 March 1897
- Fate: Sold for scrap, August 1921

General characteristics
- Class & type: Eclipse-class protected cruiser
- Displacement: 5,600 long tons (5,690 t)
- Length: 350 ft (106.7 m)
- Beam: 53 ft 6 in (16.3 m)
- Draught: 20 ft 6 in (6.25 m)
- Installed power: 9,600 ihp (7,200 kW); 8 cylindrical boilers
- Propulsion: 2 shafts, 2 Inverted triple-expansion steam engines
- Speed: 18.5 knots (34.3 km/h; 21.3 mph)
- Complement: 450
- Armament: As built: 5 × QF 6-inch (152 mm) guns; 6 × QF 4.7-inch (120 mm) guns; 6 × 3-pounder QF guns; 3 × 18-inch torpedo tubes
- Armour: Gun shields: 3 in (76 mm); Engine hatch: 6 in (152 mm); Decks: 1.5–3 in (38–76 mm); Conning tower: 6 in (152 mm)

HMS Eclipse was an Eclipse-class protected cruiser built for the Royal Navy in the mid-1890s.

== Design ==
Eclipse-class second-class protected cruisers were preceded by the shorter Astraea-class cruisers. Eclipse had a displacement of 5,600 long tons (5,700 t; 6,300 short tons) when at normal load. It had a total length of 373 ft (114 m), a beam of 53 ft 6 in (16.31 m), a metacentric height of around 3 m (9 ft 10 in), and a draught of 20 ft 6 in (6.25 m). It was powered by two inverted triple-expansion steam engines which used steam from eight cylindrical boilers. Using normal draught, the boilers were intended to provide the engines with enough steam to generate 8,000 indicated horsepower (6,000 kW) and to reach a speed of 18.5 knots (34.3 km/h; 21.3 mph); using forced draft, the equivalent figures were 9,600 indicated horsepower (7,200 kW) and a speed of 19.5 knots (36.1 km/h; 22.4 mph). Eclipse-class cruisers carried a maximum of 1,075 long tons (1,092 t) of coal and achieved maximum speed of 20 knots (37 km/h; 23 mph) in sea trials.

It carried five 40-calibre 6-inch (152 mm) quick-firing (QF) guns in single mounts protected by gun shields. One gun was mounted on the forecastle, two on the quarterdeck and one pair was abreast the bridge. They fired 100-pound (45 kg) shells at a muzzle velocity of 2,205 ft/s (672 m/s). The secondary armament consisted of six 40-calibre 4.7-inch (120 mm) guns; three on each broadside. Their 45-pound (20.4 kg) shells were fired at a muzzle velocity of 2,125 ft/s (648 m/s). It was fitted with three 18-inch torpedo tubes, one submerged tube on each broadside and one above water in the stern. Its ammunition supply consisted of 200 six-inch rounds per gun, 250 shells for each 4.7-inch gun, 300 rounds per gun for the 76 mm (3.0 in)s and 500 for each three-pounder. Eclipse had ten torpedoes, presumably four for each broadside tube and two for the stern tube.

== Service ==
HMS Eclipse was launched in 1894 and completed in 1897. In 1899 she served in the Indian Ocean as the flagship of the East Indies Squadron.

She was commissioned at Chatham dockyard in late May 1901, with a crew of 450 officers and men to relieve HMS Hermione on the China Station.

On the outbreak of the First World War she formed part of the 12th Cruiser Squadron, which patrolled at the Western end of the English Channel, with particular duties to stop suspicious vessels and prevent disguised minelayers from interfering with cross-Channel traffic.
