= HMS Flying Fish (1897) =

Destroyer of the Royal Navy

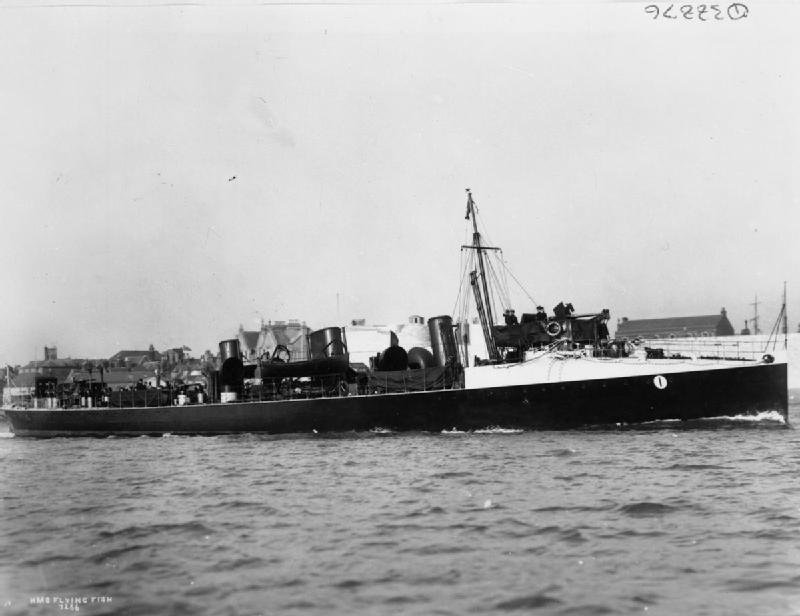
- HMS Flying Fish

History

United Kingdom
- Name: Flying Fish
- Ordered: 1895 – 1896 Naval Estimates
- Builder: Palmers Shipbuilding and Iron Company Jarrow-on-Tyne
- Laid down: 9 August 1896
- Launched: 4 March 1897
- Commissioned: June 1898
- Out of service: Laid up in reserve, 1919
- Fate: Sold for breaking, 30 August 1919

General characteristics
- Class & type: Palmer three funnel, 30 knot destroyer
- Displacement: 390 long tons (396 t) standard; 420 long tons (427 t) full load
- Length: 219 ft 9 in (66.98 m) o/a
- Beam: 20 ft 9 in (6.32 m)
- Draught: 8 ft 11 in (2.72 m)
- Installed power: 6,000 shp (4,500 kW)
- Propulsion: 4 × Reed water tube boilers; 2 × vertical triple-expansion steam engines; 2 shafts
- Speed: 30 kn (56 km/h)
- Range: 80 tons coal; 1,490 nmi (2,760 km) at 11 kn (20 km/h)
- Complement: 60 officers and men
- Armament: 1 × QF 12-pounder 12 cwt Mark I L/40 naval gun on a P Mark I low angle mount; 5 × QF 6-pdr 8 cwt L/40 naval gun on a Mark I* low angle mount; 2 × single tubes for 18-inch (450mm) torpedoes

HMS Flying Fish was a Palmer three funnel, 30 knot destroyer ordered by the Royal Navy under the 1896 – 1897 Naval Estimates. She was the tenth ship to carry this name.

== Construction ==
Flying Fish was laid down on 9 August 1896 at the Palmer shipyard at Jarrow-on-Tyne and launched on 4 March 1897. During her builder’s trials she made her contracted speed requirement. She was completed and accepted by the Royal Navy in June 1898.

== Service history ==
=== Pre-War ===
After commissioning she was assigned to the East Coast Flotilla of the 1st Fleet based at Harwich.

She served in the Portsmouth instructional flotilla under the command of Commander Morgan Singer until early January 1901. On 16 December 1901 Flying Fish was re-commissioned by Lieutenant Hugh Percival Buckle for service on the Mediterranean Station, as tender to the battleship Royal Oak. After leaving Devonport for her commission in February 1902, she encountered hard weather in the Bay of Biscay and was knocked about so that she started leaking, and had to port at Brest. She was sufficiently repaired to be able to return to Devonport for more extensive repairs in late February, and eventually arrived at Malta two months late on 16 April 1902. In September 1902 she visited the Aegean Sea with other ships of the station for combined manoeuvres near Nauplia.

On 30 August 1912 the Admiralty directed all destroyer classes were to be designated by alpha characters starting with the letter 'A'. Since her design speed was 30-knots and she had three funnels she was assigned to the C class. After 30 September 1913, she was known as a C-class destroyer and had the letter ‘C’ painted on the hull below the bridge area and on either the fore or aft funnel.

=== World War I ===
For the test mobilization in July 1914 Flying Fish was assigned to the 8th Destroyer Flotilla based at Chatham. In August she deployed with the 8th Flotilla to the Tyne River. The destroyer performed patrol duties with the Tyne Patrol including anti-submarine and counter-mining patrols.

In May 1916 when she was deployed to the 7th Destroyer Flotilla based at the Humber River. She performed patrol duties on the Humber Patrol including anti-submarine and counter-mining patrols. She would remain there for the remainder of the war.

In 1919 Flying Fish was paid off and laid-up in reserve awaiting disposal. She was sold on 30 August 1919 to TR Sales for breaking.

== Pennant numbers ==
Pennant number	From	To
P86	6 Dec 1914	1 Sep 1915
D57	1 Sep 1915	1 Jan 1918
D40	1 Jan 1918	13 Sep 1918
H69	13 Sep 1918	23 Jul 1919

== Notes ==
Note: All tabular data under General Characteristics only from the listed Jane's Fighting Ships volume unless otherwise specified

== Bibliography ==
- Chesneau, Roger & Kolesnik, Eugene M., eds. (1979). Conway's All The World's Fighting Ships 1860–1905. London: Conway Maritime Press. ISBN 0-85177-133-5.
- Colledge, J. J.; Warlow, Ben (2006) [1969]. Ships of the Royal Navy: The Complete Record of All Fighting Ships of the Royal Navy from the 15th Century to the Present (3rd Rev ed.). London: Chatham Publishing. ISBN 978-1-86176-281-8. OCLC 67375475.
- Dittmar, F. J. & Colledge, J. J. (1972). British Warships 1914–1919. Shepperton, UK: Ian Allan. ISBN 0-7110-0380-7.
- Friedman, Norman (2009). British Destroyers: From Earliest Days to the Second World War. Barnsley, UK: Seaforth Publishing. ISBN 978-1-84832-049-9.
- Gardiner, Robert & Gray, Randal, eds. (1985). Conway's All The World's Fighting Ships 1906–1921. London: Conway Maritime Press. ISBN 0-85177-245-5.
- Lyon, David (2001) [1996]. The First Destroyers. London: Caxton Editions. ISBN 1-84067-3648.
- Manning, T. D. (1961). The British Destroyer. London: Putnam & Co. OCLC 6470051.
- March, Edgar J. (1966). British Destroyers: A History of Development, 1892–1953; Drawn by Admiralty Permission From Official Records & Returns, Ships' Covers & Building Plans. London: Seeley Service. OCLC 164893555.
