= HMS Minerva (1895) =

Eclipse-class cruiser

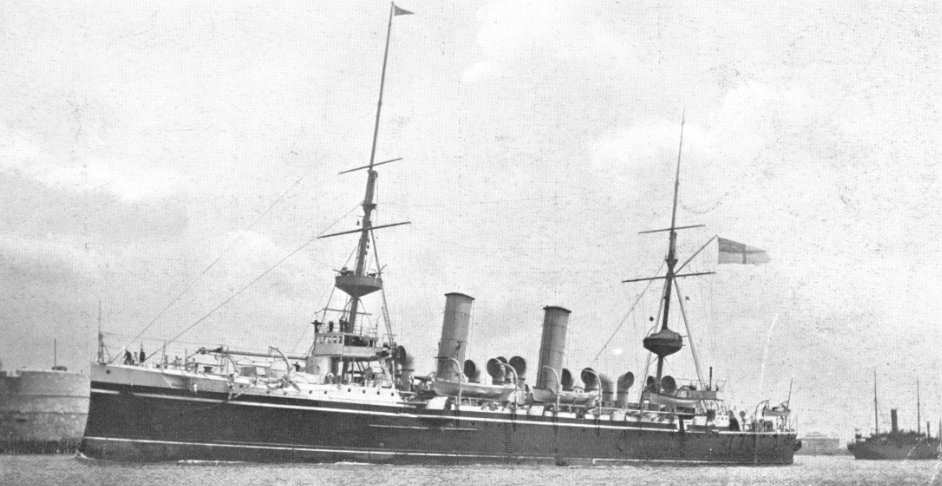
- Minerva at anchor shortly after her completion

History

United Kingdom
- Name: HMS Minerva
- Namesake: Minerva
- Builder: Chatham Dockyard
- Laid down: 4 December 1893
- Launched: 23 September 1895
- Completed: 4 February 1897
- Fate: Sold for scrap, 5 October 1920

General characteristics
- Class & type: Eclipse-class protected cruiser
- Displacement: 5,600 long tons (5,690 t)
- Length: 350 ft (106.7 m)
- Beam: 53 ft 6 in (16.3 m)
- Draught: 20 ft 6 in (6.25 m)
- Installed power: 9,600 ihp (7,200 kW); 8 cylindrical boilers
- Propulsion: 2 shafts, 2 Inverted triple-expansion steam engines
- Speed: 18.5 knots (34.3 km/h; 21.3 mph)
- Complement: 450
- Armament: As built: 5 × QF 6-inch (152 mm) guns; 6 × QF 4.7-inch (120 mm) guns; 6 × 3-pounder QF guns; 3 × 18-inch torpedo tubes; After 1905: 11 × six-inch QF guns; 9 × 76 mm (3.0 in) QF guns; 7 × 3-pounder QF guns; 3 × 18-inch torpedo tubes
- Armour: Gun shields: 3 in (76 mm); Engine hatch: 6 in (152 mm); Decks: 1.5–3 in (38–76 mm); Conning tower: 6 in (152 mm)

HMS Minerva was an Eclipse-class protected cruiser built for the Royal Navy in the mid-1890s.

== Construction and operational history ==
The ship was laid down at Chatham Dockyard, Kent, on 4 December 1893, and was floated out on 23 September 1895.

=== Pre-1914 ===
HMS Minerva served in the Channel Squadron after her launch. She again served in the Channel Squadron from March 1901, including as guard ship at Cowes in early 1902. . At the 1901 Census of England and Wales she was recorded as being at Gibraltar with the Training Squadron. She was used in the spring of 1902 for a series of trials to compare her cylindrical boilers with the Belleville boilers of HMS Hyacinth, with the performance of the boilers being compared at various powers in tests in the English Channel, followed by long sea runs to the Mediterranean Sea and back. While the Belleville water-tube boilers of Hyacinth proved to be more efficient than Minerva's cylindrical boilers, and lighter, but on the long runs to and from the Mediterranean, Hyacinth's boilers proved prone to leaks, and suffered a burst boiler tube. The results of these and similar trials led to the use of Belleville boilers in new construction to be stopped.

She took part in the fleet review held at Spithead on 16 August 1902 for the coronation of King Edward VII, and visited the Aegean Sea with other ships of the Channel squadron and Mediterranean Fleet for combined manoeuvres in September and early October 1902, returning to Chatham on 20 October. Captain Doveton Sturdee was appointed in command on 17 October 1902.

The ship was present at the relief operations in Sicily after the great earthquake and tsunami in the Strait of Messina, 28 December 1908. The crew qualified for the Medal of Merit for Participation in the Relief of the Earthquake in Calabria and Sicily, instituted by the King of Italy Vittorio Emanuele III.

Minerva transferred from the Mediterranean to the United Kingdom in 1912, taking part in the rescue attempts when the submarine HMS B2 was sunk in a collision in October 1912.

=== First World War ===
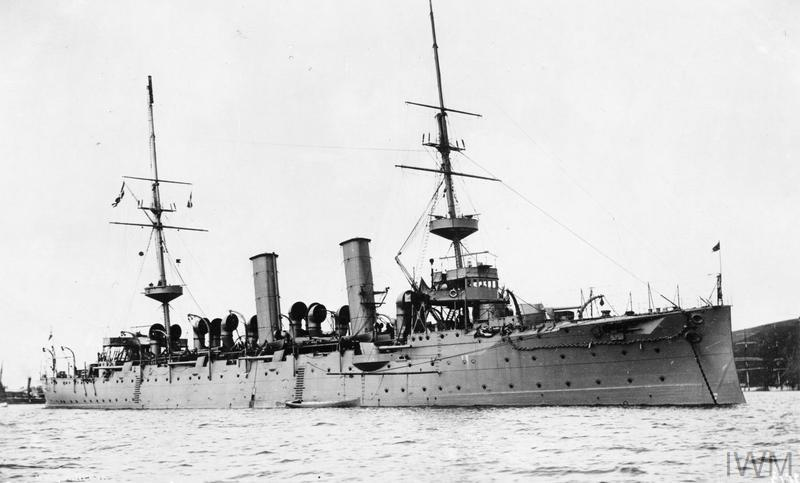
Minerva in WWI

On the outbreak of the First World War in August 1914, Minerva was part of the 11th Cruiser Squadron based in Ireland, but was detached to join the 5th Cruiser Squadron in September, with the responsibility of intercepting enemy merchant shipping trying to return to Germany or Austria. During these operations it captured and scuttled the Austrian merchant ship Bathori off Vigo, in North-West Spain on 3 September 1914.

Minerva escorted a troop convoy from Britain to Egypt in November 1914, and formed part of the Allied naval forces supporting the Gallipoli Campaign. When the Turkish torpedo-boat Demirhisar attempted to attack Allied troop ships near Chios on 16 April 1915, Minerva, together with the destroyers Jed, Kennet and Wear, forced Demirhisar to run aground, where the Turkish torpedo boat was later destroyed. Minerva supported the landing at Cape Helles in April and at Suvla Bay in August.

Minerva was deployed to the China Station in 1916, and then to the Indian Ocean and Red Sea in 1917, then remaining off East Africa until the end of the war. She returned to Queenstown, Ireland in 1920, and was sold for scrapping on 5 October 1920.
