= HMS London (69) =

Cruiser of the Royal Navy

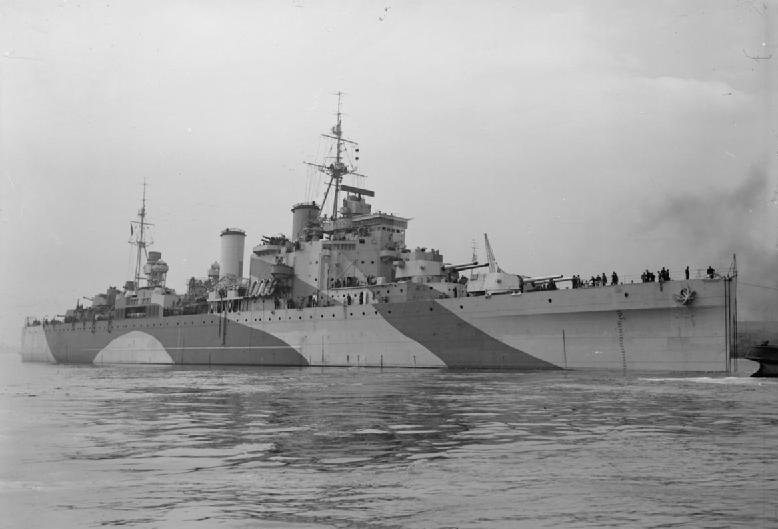

History

United Kingdom
- Name: HMS London
- Namesake: London
- Builder: Portsmouth Dockyard
- Laid down: 23 February 1926
- Launched: 14 September 1927
- Commissioned: 31 January 1929
- Identification: Pennant number 69
- Fate: Sold for scrapping, 3 January 1950. Broken up from 22 January 1950 by T. W. Ward of Barrow

General characteristics
- Class & type: County-class heavy cruiser
- Displacement: 9,750 tons standard; 13,315 tons full load
- Length: 633 ft (193 m)
- Beam: 66 ft (20 m)
- Draught: 21 ft (6.4 m)
- Propulsion: Eight Admiralty 3-drum boilers; Four shaft Parsons geared turbines; 80,000 shp (60 MN)
- Speed: 32 knots (59.3 km/h)
- Range: 9,120 nmi at 12 kn
- Complement: 784
- Armament: 8 × BL 8-inch (203 mm L/50) Mk.VIII in twin mounts Mk.I*; 4–8 × QF 4-inch (102 mm L/45) Mk.V in single mounts HA Mk.III; 4 × QF 2 pdr (40 mm L/39) Mk.II in single mounts HA Mk.I; 8 × QF 0.5-inch (12.7 mm L/50) Mk.III in quad mounts Mk.I; 8 × 21 inch (533 mm) torpedoes in quad mounts
- Aircraft carried: One Supermarine Walrus, one catapult

HMS London, pennant number C69, was a member of the second group of the County-class heavy cruisers of the Royal Navy. She and her sisters; Sussex, Shropshire, and Devonshire differed from the earlier group of Counties (known as the Kent class) by having a smaller forward superstructure, which was positioned slightly further aft, and little armour plating. HMS London's career spanned over twenty years.

== Interwar career and rebuild ==
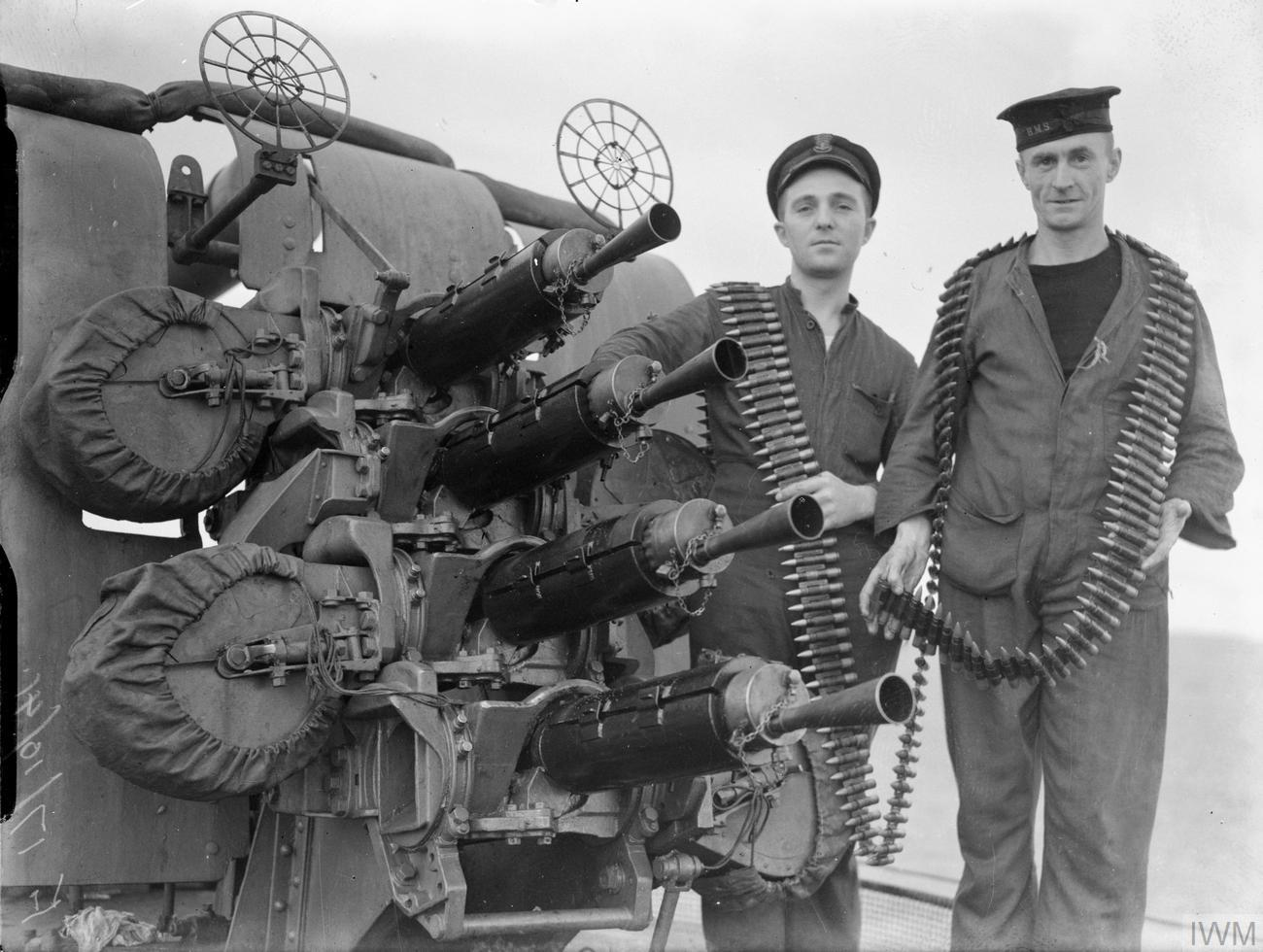
The gun crew of a .5-inch four barrelled Vickers gun at their quarter on board HMS London. Note the long belts of ammunition hanging off the two men (1941)

London was laid down at Portsmouth Dockyard on 23 February 1926, and later launched on 14 September 1927 and commissioned on 31 January 1929. London served with the 1st Cruiser Squadron until March 1939, and was the flagship of Admiral Max Horton during his time in command of 1st Cruisers. Her flag captain during this time was Henry Harwood.

In October 1931, London and the cruiser Shropshire and the destroyers Achates and Acasta were sent to Cyprus Serious rioting in Nicosia had started on the night of the 21/22, by crowds calling for Enosis, a union between Cyprus and Greece.

From 1936, she was the flagship of Vice-Admiral Charles Kennedy-Purvis (later Sir Charles) and on 1 September 1937, she and her sister ship Sussex made a week-long goodwill visit to Venice, mooring opposite the Doges Palace. London and her sister ship Shropshire facilitated the evacuation of thousands of civilians from Barcelona during the Spanish Civil War. From March 1939, she was under reconstruction at the Chatham Dockyard, and was much altered in appearance. Replacement of her machinery was considered, but later abandoned.

She was given a new superstructure above the main deck and in many ways resembled a Fiji-class light cruiser. Her single 4-inch gun mounts were changed to twin mounts, and several 20mm AA guns and radar were added. She was fitted with a 3½-inch cemented armoured belt, 8 feet deep down from the main armoured deck which covered the machinery spaces. The reconstruction work was finally finished in March 1941. The refit was planned to be implemented to other ships of the County class, but due to wartime pressures no other ships were reconstructed.

== Wartime career ==
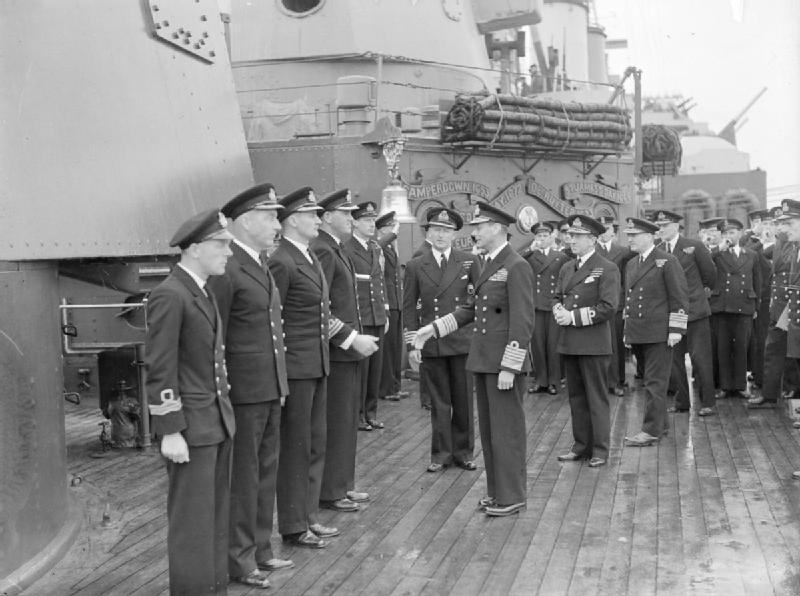
HM King George VI meeting the officers of HMS London lined up on deck next to one of the cruiser's 8-inch gun turrets, part of the Home Fleet at Scapa Flow.

London was involved in the pursuit of the German battleship Bismarck in May 1941. During this time at sea, many cracks appeared in her upper deck and hull, due to the weight of the new superstructure causing stresses. She entered a commercial shipyard on the River Tyne in October 1941 and was under repair until February 1942.

London then spent from March 1942 to November 1942 in the North Atlantic on convoy protection duties in the company of several US Navy warships.

This phase of operations in the heavy North Atlantic seas caused hull cracks and popped rivets in her lower hull, necessitating the ship again going into the dry-dock in December 1942 for strengthening of the hull and for the fitting of newer and more refined radar, and of more light anti-aircraft guns. This refit rectified her hull and was completed in May 1943, with the ship ready for sea in July. After sea trials and loading of ammunition, she was assigned to operate off the South African coast and then to the Eastern Fleet for the rest of the war.

== Postwar, the Amethyst incident, and decommissioning ==
After the Second World War, and being the Royal Navy's only modernised 8-inch gun cruiser, London was refitted for further service in early 1946 to let her serve in the postwar fleet. Following the refit, she sailed for the far east in 1946 and served there for the next three years on the China Station.

=== Amethyst incident ===
In the spring of 1949, the frigate Amethyst became trapped by advancing Communist Chinese forces up the Yangtze River. London sailed up the river as a show of strength to help free the frigate. The Communist forces were not intimidated and took the cruiser under fire. London returned fire with her 8-inch and 4-inch guns, firing hundreds of rounds but was hit several times. Her two forward 8-inch turrets and "X" turret aft were knocked out and her bridge sustained several hits. London retreated down river and returned to Hong Kong for repairs which lasted until the end of July.

London remained in Chinese waters until August 1949, when she was relieved by HMS Kenya, and she returned to Britain in the autumn of 1949. London was surveyed to determine if an extensive repair and refit for further service was feasible but the condition of her machinery (dating back to 1928 and not replaced during her rebuild in the 1930s) as well as the large crew she required made her too expensive a proposition, given Britain's post-war financial difficulties. She was retired to reserve in the River Fal until sold for scrapping in 1950.

== Gallery ==
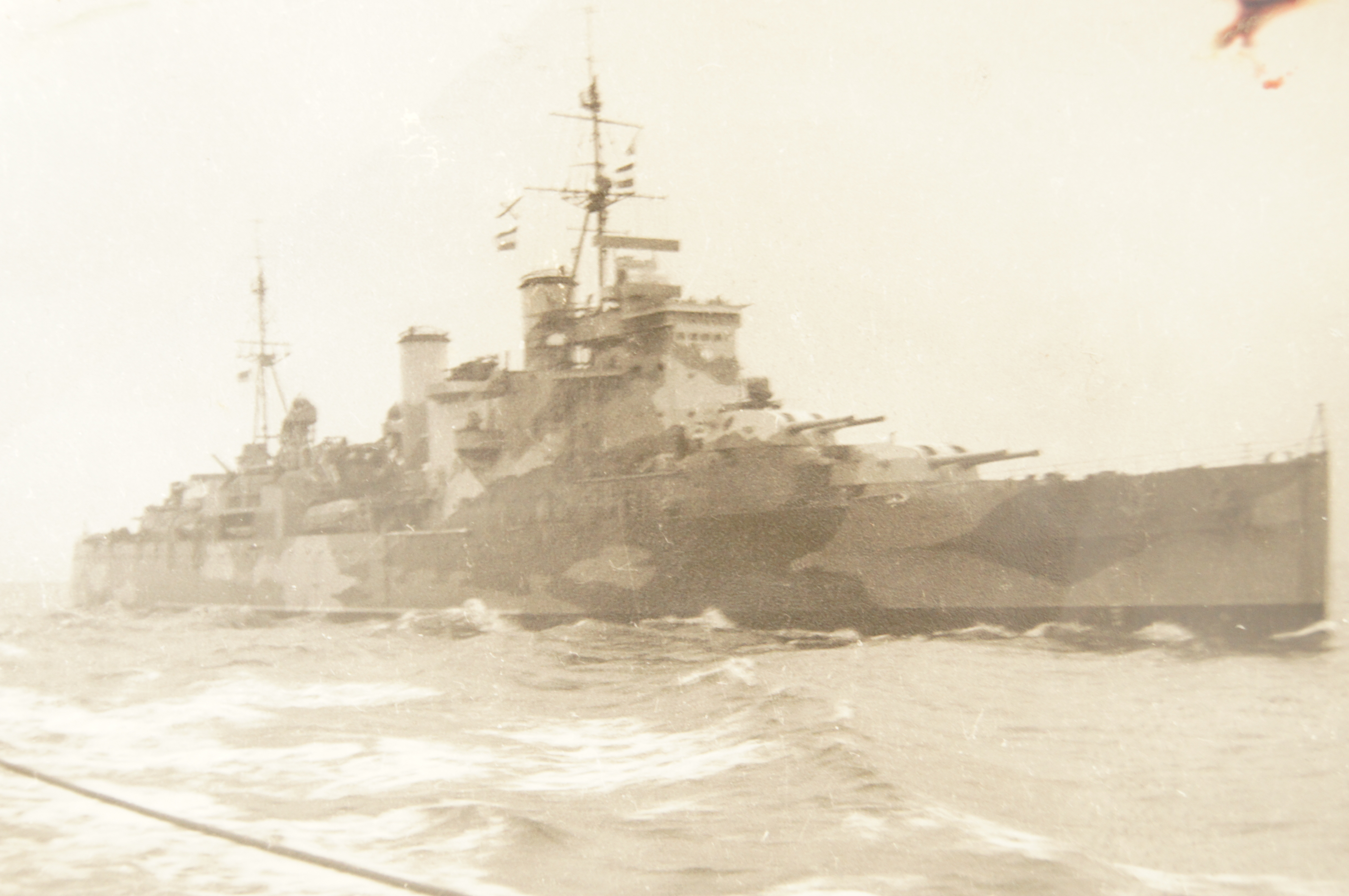
A photo of HMS London in 1941.

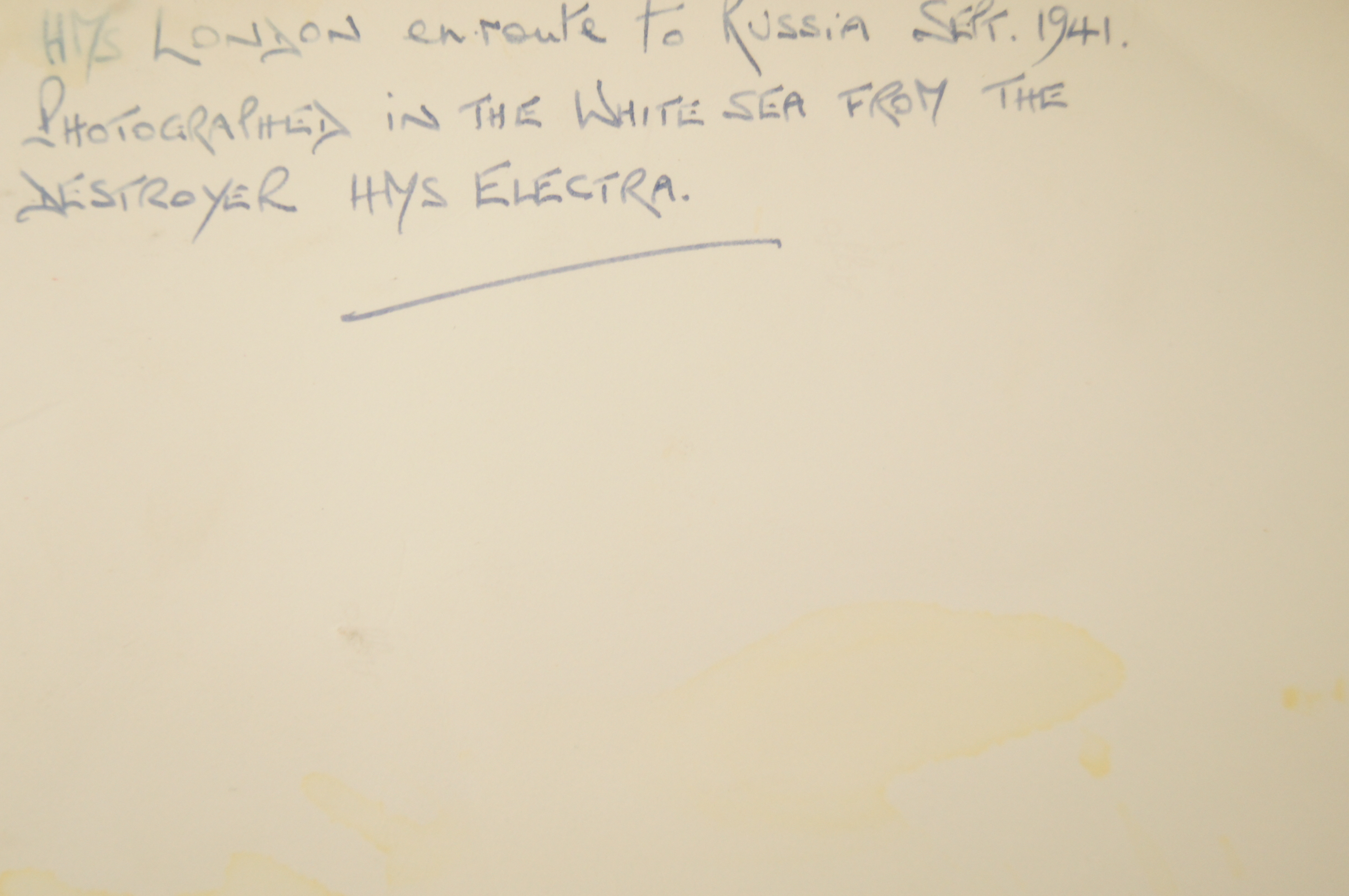
The back of the same photo with information.
