= HMS Cumberland (57) =

County-class cruiser

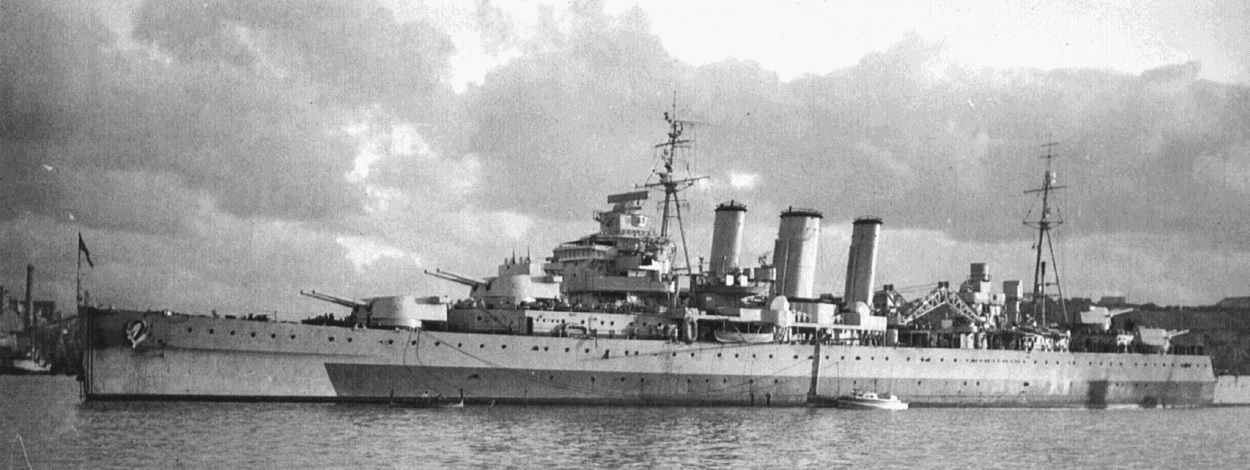
- HMS Cumberland

History

United Kingdom
- Name: Cumberland
- Builder: Vickers-Armstrongs, Barrow in Furness
- Laid down: 18 October 1924
- Launched: 16 March 1926
- Commissioned: 23 February 1928
- Recommissioned: 1951
- Decommissioned: 1946
- Identification: Pennant number 57
- Fate: Sold for scrap 1959

General characteristics
- Class & type: County-class heavy cruiser
- Displacement: 9,750 tons (9,924 t) standard; 13,450 tons (13,670 t) full load
- Length: 630 ft (190 m)
- Beam: 68 ft 3 in (20.80 m)
- Draught: 16 ft 3 in (4.95 m)
- Propulsion: Eight Admiralty 3-drum boilers; Four shaft Brown Curtis geared turbines; 80,000 shp
- Speed: 31.5 knots (58.3 km/h)
- Range: 3,100 nautical miles at 31.5 knots (5,740 km at 58 km/h), 13,300 nautical miles at 12 knots (24,600 km at 22 km/h); 3,400 tons (3,450 t) fuel oil
- Complement: 679 (710 as flagship)
- Armament: Original configuration: 8 × 8 in (203 mm) dual guns; 4 × 4 in (102 mm) single AA guns; 2 × 2 pdr (40 mm) quadruple pom-pom mounts; 2 × 0.5 in MG quadruple guns; 2 × 21 in (533 mm) quad torpedo tubes
- Armour: Original configuration: 1 to 4 in magazine box protection; 1.375 in deck; 1 in side-plating, turrets and bulkheads; 4.5 in belt; 4 internal boiler room sides (added 1936-1940)
- Aircraft carried: Three aircraft with one catapult, removed in 1942

HMS Cumberland was a County-class heavy cruiser of the Royal Navy that saw action during the Second World War.

== Career ==
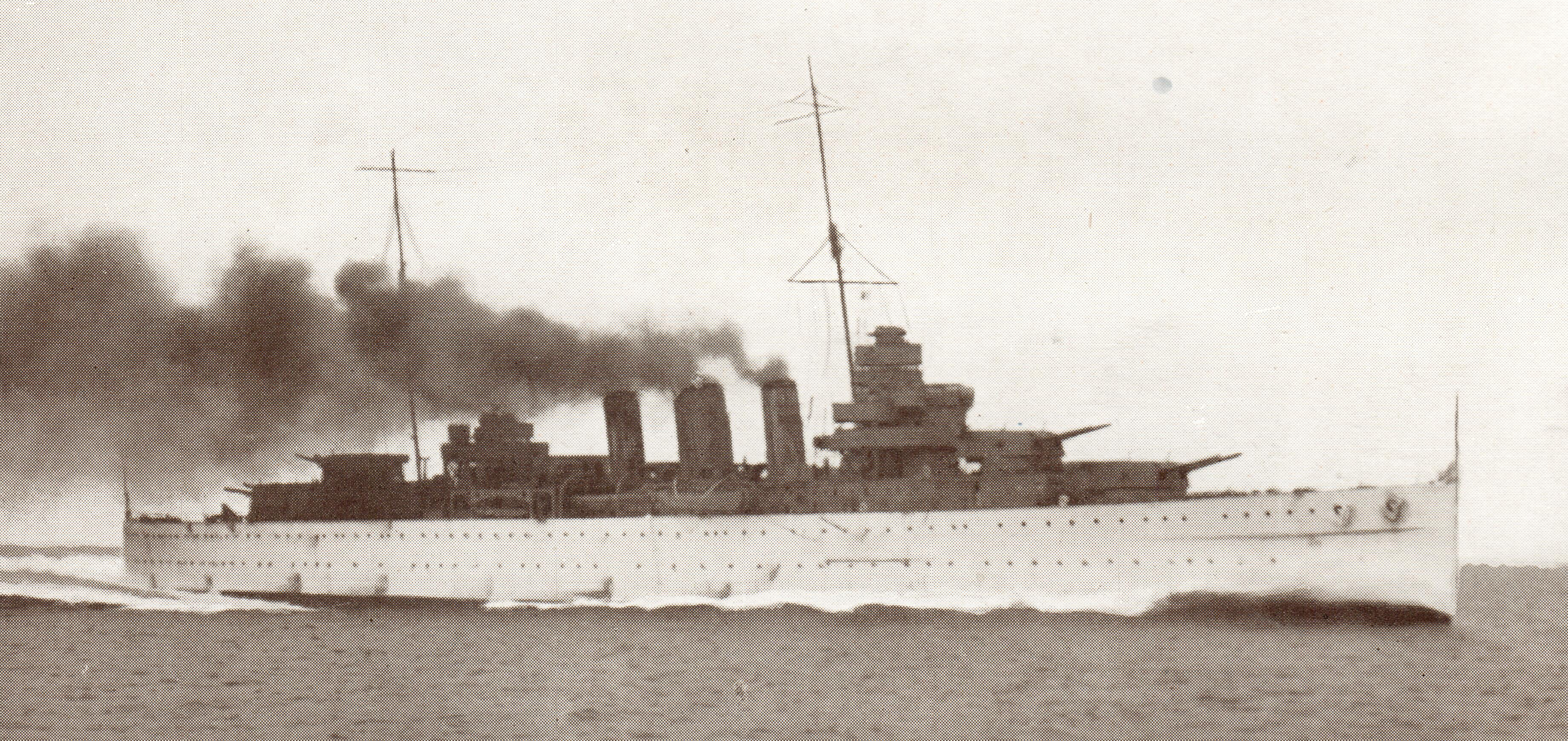
County-class heavy cruiser HMS Cumberland

Cumberland was built by Vickers-Armstrongs at Barrow-in-Furness in 1926. According to the builders she was 10,000 long tons (10,000 t) displacement, 630 feet (190 m) overall × 68 feet 3 inches (20.8 m) × 43 feet 4 inches (13.2 m) capable of 32.25 knots (59.73 km/h; 37.11 mph) with engines rated at 80,000 horsepower (60,000 kW). She served on the China Station with the 5th Cruiser Squadron from 1928 until 1938, returning to the UK in March 1935 for a refit. In 1938, she joined the 2nd cruiser squadron on the South American station.

=== In the South Atlantic ===
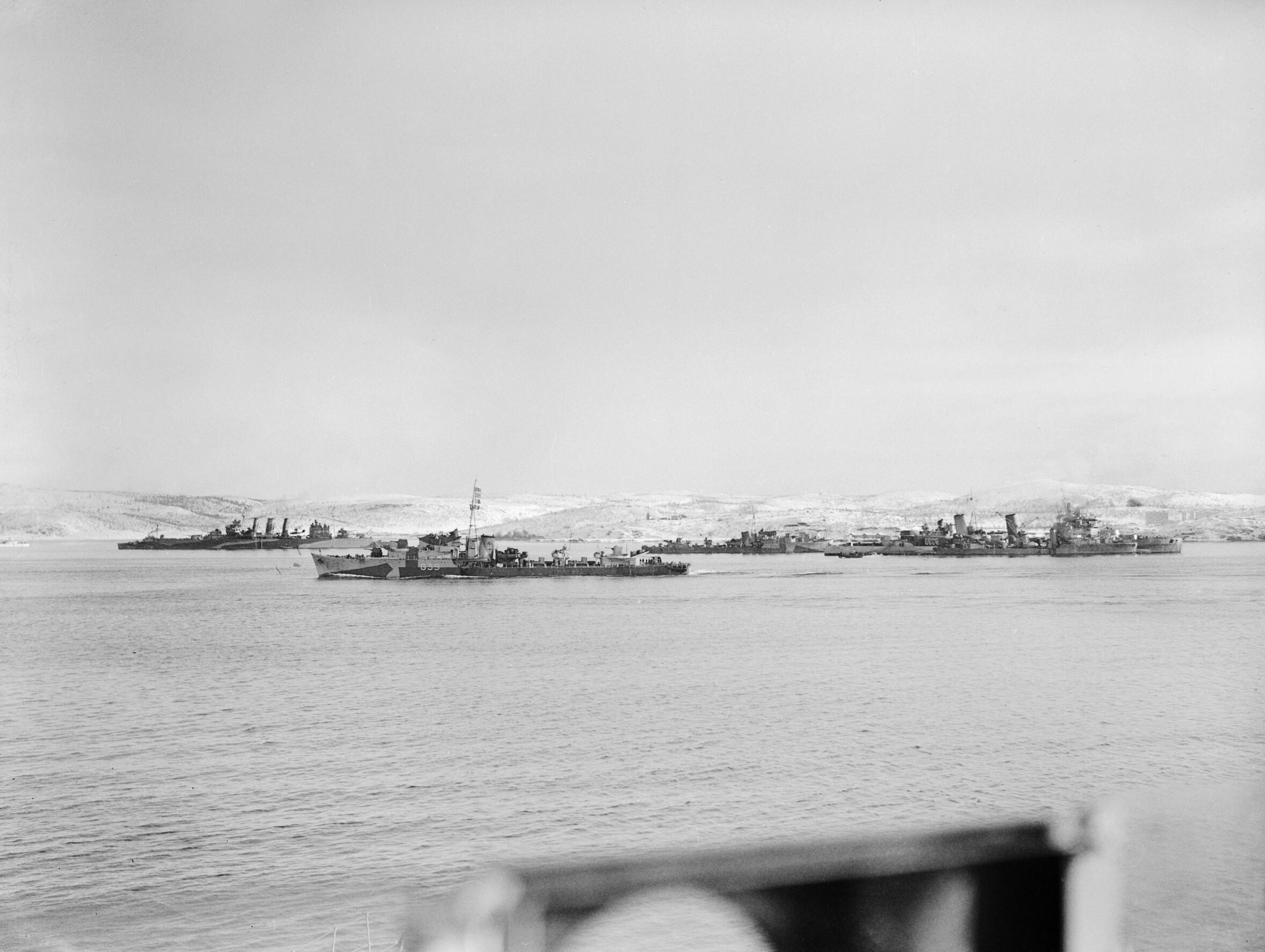
In the distance HMS Obdurate (centre) leaving a Russian bay, with HMS Cumberland (left) and HMS Belfast (right) with HMS Faulknor alongside. Photograph taken at Vaenga after the arrival of convoy JW 53.

At the start of the Second World War in 1939, Cumberland was assigned to 2nd Cruiser Squadron Force G, the South American Division. At the start of December she was forced to refit in the Falkland Islands, thus depriving the force of their strongest unit. Without her, HMS Exeter, Ajax and Achilles engaged the German raider Admiral Graf Spee in the Battle of the River Plate on 13 December. Cumberland received a garbled indication that a contact was being made and moved north to reinforce, arriving at the River Plate at 22:00 on 14 December, after steaming 1,014 nmi (1,878 km; 1,167 mi) in 34 hours, at 29.8 kn (55.2 km/h; 34.3 mph). Admiral Graf Spee had put into neutral Montevideo and was trapped there, as Cumberland along with Ajax and Achilles (Exeter having been severely damaged) patrolled the estuary, resulting in Admiral Graf Spee being scuttled by her crew on 17 December.

=== Service off Africa ===
After this, Cumberland sailed to Simonstown, South Africa, spending between January and February undergoing a refit. She then escorted convoys along the African coast, bound for the Middle East. In July, she, with her sister HMS Cornwall, with hunting the German commerce raider Thor (known as Raider E to the Royal Navy). Whilst on patrol, she intercepted the Vichy French merchant Poitiers, which had been carrying ammunition to the Ivory Coast. Rather than see their ship fall into enemy hands, the crew promptly opened its sea cocks and set fire to its cargo. Later that month, she fought on the Battle of Dakar, suffering damage from a French coastal battery. In December, Cumberland resumed the search for the merchant raider Thor but found nothing.

=== Arctic convoys ===
In October 1941, Cumberland joined the 1st Cruiser Squadron Home Fleet escorting the Arctic convoys until January 1944, winning the battle honour Arctic 1942-1943.

=== In the Far East ===
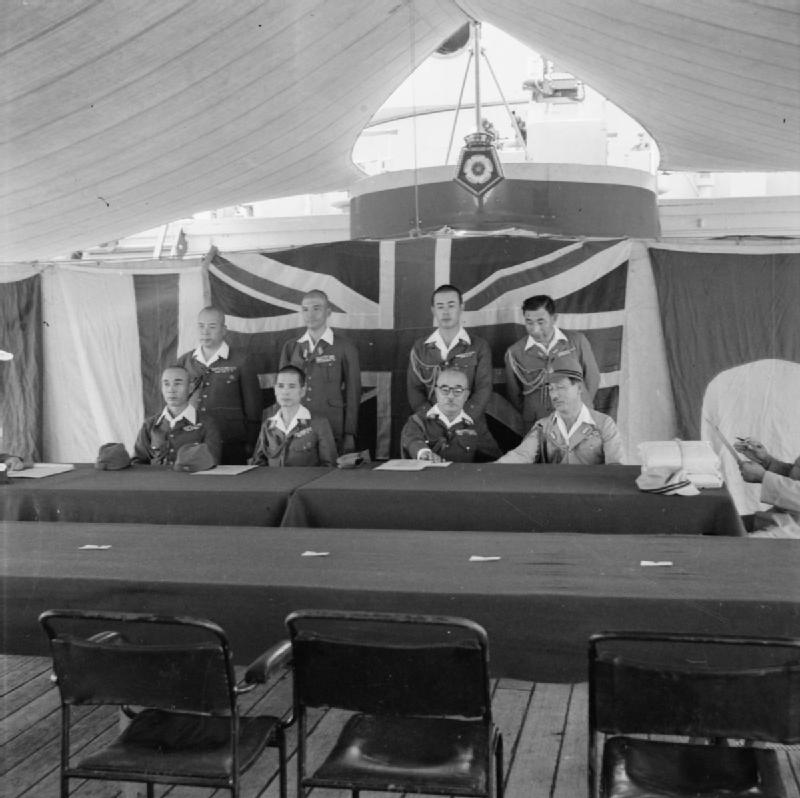
Japanese military representatives on board HMS Cumberland for a conference to discuss terms by which Allied forces would take control of Java, Indonesia

She was then transferred to the Far East, as part of 4th Cruiser Squadron Eastern Fleet. In September, she carried out raids on Northern Sumatra. During this period, Cumberland won the battle honours Sabang 1944 and Burma 1945. On 7 February 1945, Cumberland was back in Simonstown to have her rudder repaired.

=== Post-war activity ===
Cumberland returned to the United Kingdom on 12 November 1945 and transported troops until June 1946, when she was placed in reserve until 1949. She was then refitted at Devonport (1949–1951) for further service as a gunnery trials ship. She lost her 8-inch turrets, and for a few years had a prototype dual 6-inch automatic turret (testing the concept for later installation in the then building Tiger-class cruisers) in 'B' position, and a prototype automatic dual 3-inch turret (also slated for the Tigers) in 'X' position. For the 1956 film The Battle of the River Plate, Cumberland played herself, arriving with unexpected speed from the Falklands after the battle, to replace the damaged HMS Exeter. Although she was without her 8-inch gun turrets at this time and was refitted with lattice masts, she is very recognisable as the last of the three-funnelled heavy cruisers to remain in service. (In the final scenes, HMS Jamaica represented Cumberland as one of the British trio patrolling off Montevideo).

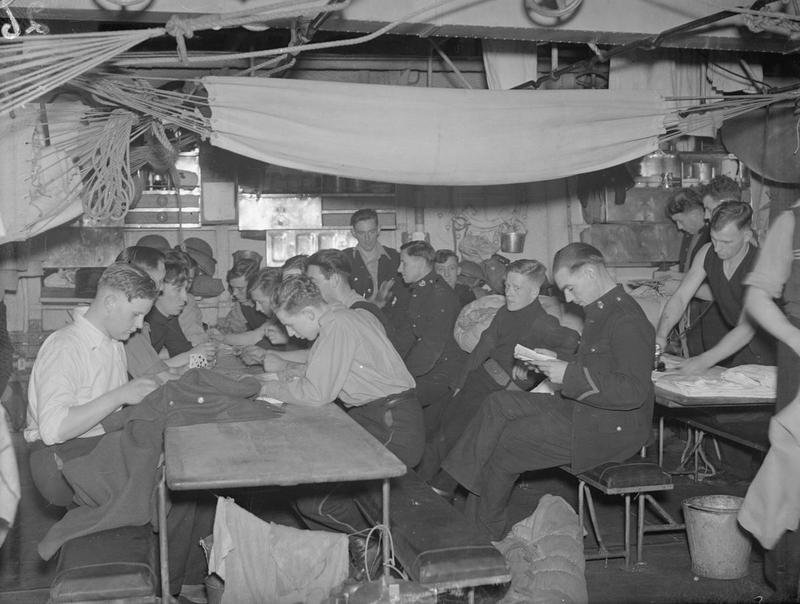
Royal Marines of the Home Fleet. Typical view of the messdeck after supper on board HMS Cumberland in late 1942

Between 1955 and 1956, HMS Cumberland was fitted with a number of trial anti-A-bomb and anti-H-bomb defences. Her first voyage in this configuration was delayed after some "defects" were found in her engine room, which were not explained as normal mechanical faults. In April 1956, having set sail on another secret test mission, she returned to port within 36 hours, following another unexplained "defect" in her main gearbox. Sabotage was suspected.

HMS Cumberland finally paid off in 1958, arriving at Cashmore's, Newport, on 3 November 1958 for scrapping.

=== Painting ===
In 1926, HMS Cumberland was the subject of a watercolour by the maritime artist A.B. Cull. Although most of Cull's work was destroyed during air raids on Britain during World War II, a small number of his works survived, and they are now on display in the National Maritime Museum's collection. However, his painting of HMS Cumberland is held in a private collection in Australia.

== Sources ==
- Boniface, Patrick (2006). HMS Cumberland: A Classic British Cruiser in War and Peace. London: Periscope Publishing Limited.
- Campbell, N.J.M. (1980). "Great Britain". In Chesneau, Roger (ed.). Conway's All the World's Fighting Ships 1922–1946. New York: Mayflower Books. pp. 2–85. ISBN 0-8317-0303-2.
- Colledge, J. J.; Warlow, Ben (2006) [1969]. Ships of the Royal Navy: The Complete Record of All Fighting Ships of the Royal Navy from the 15th Century to the Present (3rd Rev ed.). London: Chatham Publishing. ISBN 978-1-86176-281-8. OCLC 67375475.
- Friedman, Norman (2010). British Cruisers: Two World Wars and After. Barnsley, UK: Seaforth Publishing. ISBN 978-1-59114-078-8.
- Johnson, Harold (1998). "Question 32/92: Battle of Soerabaya". Warship International. XXXV (2): 211–212. ISSN 0043-0374.
- Lenton, H. T. (1998). British & Empire Warships of the Second World War. Annapolis, Maryland: Naval Institute Press. ISBN 1-55750-048-7.
- Raven, Alan & Roberts, John (1980). British Cruisers of World War Two. Annapolis, Maryland: Naval Institute Press. ISBN 0-87021-922-7.
- Rohwer, Jürgen (2005). Chronology of the War at Sea 1939–1945: The Naval History of World War Two (Third Revised ed.). Annapolis, Maryland: Naval Institute Press. ISBN 1-59114-119-2.
- Vickers-Armstrongs Limited (1930). The Activities of Vickers-Armstrongs Limited, naval construction works, Barrow-in-Furness. London: Vickers-Armstrongs Ltd.
- White, John Baker (1957). Sabotage is suspected. London: Evans Bros. OCLC 2773193.
- Whitley, M. J. (1995). Cruisers of World War Two: An International Encyclopedia. London: Cassell. ISBN 1-86019-874-0.
