= 1931 Cyprus revolt =

1931 anti-British revolt in colonial Cyprus

- Date: 21 October – 25 October 1931
- Location: Major cities and villages of Cyprus
- Methods: Arson, demonstrations, rioting, vandalism
- Result: Suppressed by the colonial police

Parties
United Kingdom: British Cyprus	Pro-Enosis demonstrators Supported by: Church of Cyprus

Lead figures
Ronald Storrs	Bishop of Kition Nikodemos

Casualties and losses
Many government buildings were destroyed, burned, or damaged; no human casualties	Deaths: 7 Injuries: 30; Arrests: 2,616

The 1931 Cyprus revolt or October Events (Greek: Οκτωβριανά, Oktovriana) was a revolt against British colonial rule that took place in Cyprus, then a British crown colony, between 21 October and early November 1931. The revolt was spearheaded by Greek Cypriots who advocated the Enosis (Union) of the island with Greece. The defeat of the rebels led to a period of autocratic British rule known as "Palmerocracy" (Παλμεροκρατία), that would last until the beginning of World War II.

== Background ==
At the outbreak of the First World War, Cyprus was nominally a part of the Ottoman Empire, while in fact being administered by the British Empire as agreed in the Cyprus Convention of 1878. On 5 November 1914, the Ottomans entered the conflict on the side of the Central Powers, prompting Britain to void the Cyprus Convention and annex the island as the two states were now at war. In 1915, Britain offered Cyprus to Greece in exchange for the Greek intervention into World War I on the side of the Triple Entente. The Greek government refused the offer as at the time it was embroiled in a deep internal crisis known as the National Schism. Cyprus had already been described as a bargaining chip for negotiating with the Greeks when it was offered in exchange for the deep water port of Argostoli in 1912.

Following the end of the war Britain received international recognition of its claims to the island at the 1923 Conference of Lausanne. Greece was the only country that could potentially contest the decision, based on the fact that four fifths of its population were ethnically Greek. However at the time Greece faced economic ruin and diplomatic isolation as a result of a disastrous defeat in the Greco-Turkish War, thus Greek envoys made no mention of Cyprus at the conference. Cyprus then attained the status of a crown colony and the number of the Cypriot Legislative Council members was increased in favor of British officials. The aforementioned setbacks did not put a halt to the spread of the Megali Idea (Great Idea) and the closely related Enosis (Union) ideologies, the ultimate goal of which was the incorporation of all areas populated by Greeks into an independent Greek state. The November 1926 appointment of Ronald Storrs (a philhellene) as the new governor of Cyprus, fostered the idea among Greek Cypriot nationalists that British rule would be a stepping stone for the eventual union with Greece.

Their relationship was to sour in 1928, when Greek Cypriots refused to take part in the celebration of the 50th anniversary of the establishment of British rule on Cyprus. Greece once again appealed for calm, limiting the spread of anti-British articles in Greek Cypriot newspapers. Education became another arena of conflict with the passage of the Education Act, which sought to curtail Greek influence in the Cypriot school curricula. The Church of Cyprus which at the time played an important role in the social and political life of the island became one of the bastions of Greek nationalism. Cypriots also lamented the supposedly preferential treatment of Malta and Egypt at the expense of Cyprus. Relations worsened further when the colonial authorities unilaterally passed a new penal code which permitted among other things the usage of torture. In 1929, Legislative Council members Archbishop of Kition Nikodemos and Stavros Stavrinakis arrived in London, presenting a memorandum to the secretary of colonies Lord Passfield which contained demands for Enosis. As with previous such attempts the answer was negative.

== Conflict ==
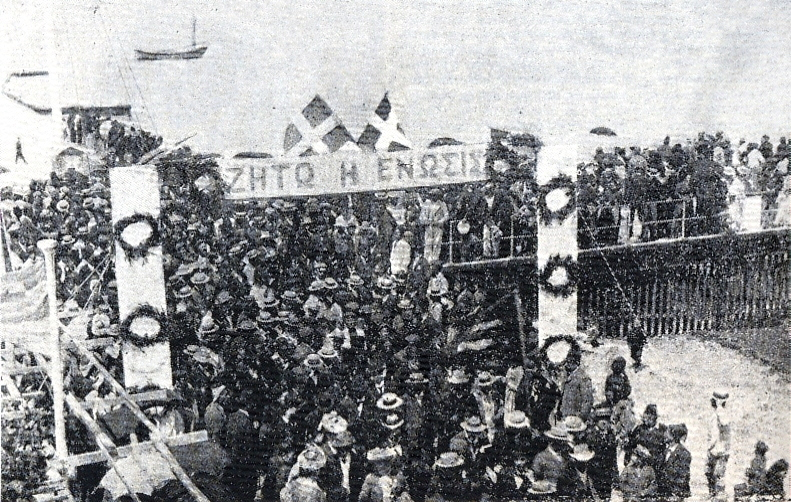
A Cypriot demonstration in the 1930s in favor of Enosis.

In September 1931, Storrs blocked a Legislative Council decision to halt tax hikes that were to cover a local budget deficit. Greek Cypriot MPs reacted by resigning from their positions. Furthermore, on 18 October, Archbishop of Kition Nikodemos called Greek Cypriots to engage in acts of civil disobedience until their demands for Enosis were fulfilled.

On 21 October, 5,000 Greek Cypriots, mostly students, priests and city notables rallied in the streets of Nicosia while chanting pro–Enosis slogans. The crowd besieged Government House, following three hours of stone throwing the building was set on fire. The rioters were eventually dispersed by police. At the same time British flags were stripped from public offices across the country, often being substituted with Greek ones.

On 23 October, 150 British troops were air-lifted from Cairo to Nicosia. On the same day, a number of British warships arrived. The cruisers Shropshire and London and the destroyer Achates arrived at Limassol. while another destroyer, Acasta, arrived at Paphos. More troops were on stand-by to go from Egypt to Cyprus by sea, but they weren't sent.

Order was restored by the beginning of November. The British accused the Greek general counsel in Nicosia Alexis Kyrou (a Greek nationalist of Cypriot descent) of instigating the revolt. Kyrou had indeed worked behind the scenes to create a united opposition front against the British prior to the revolt, in direct disobedience to the orders he received from Athens. A total of seven protesters were killed, thirty were injured, ten were exiled for life, while 2,606 received various punishments ranging from prison terms to fines on account of seditious activities.

== Aftermath ==
The revolt led to the dismissal of Kyrou whose actions had inadvertently damaged both the pro-Enosis cause and Anglo–Hellenic relations. The revolt also dealt a blow to Storrs' career, he was soon transferred to the post of Governor of Northern Rhodesia. The Legislative Council and municipal elections were abolished, the appointment of village authorities and district judges was relegated to the governor of the island. Propagating pro-Enosis ideas and flying foreign flags was banned as was the assembly of more than five people. The new measures were aimed at suppressing the operation of the Orthodox church and communist organizations, like the AKEL. Censorship had a severe effect on the operation of newspapers especially those associated with left wing politics. Cyprus thus entered a period of autocratic rule known as Palmerokratia (Παλμεροκρατία, "Palmerocracy"), named after governor Richmond Palmer, which started shortly before the revolt and would last until the beginning of World War II. The revolt has been described as the most intense rebellion that Britain faced in the interwar period. The revolt is known in Cypriot historiography as Oktovriana (October Events).

Monuments commemorating the October Events were erected in Strovolos and Pissouri in November 2007 and October 2016 respectively.

== See also ==
- Akrotiri and Dhekelia
