= HMS Sussex (96) =

Cruiser of the Royal Navy

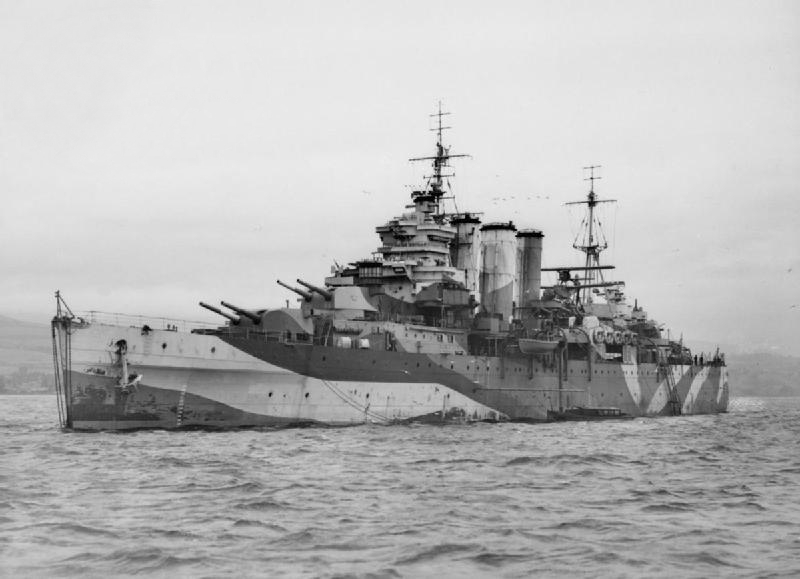

History

United Kingdom
- Name: HMS Sussex
- Namesake: Sussex
- Builder: Hawthorn Leslie, Hebburn-on-Tyne
- Laid down: 1 February 1927
- Launched: 22 February 1928
- Commissioned: 19 March 1929
- Decommissioned: 3 January 1950
- Identification: Pennant number: 96
- Fate: Scrapping started on 23 February 1950 at Arnott Young, Dalmuir.

General characteristics
- Class & type: County-class heavy cruiser
- Displacement: 9,750 tons standard; 13,315 tons full load
- Length: 633 ft (193 m)
- Beam: 66 ft (20 m)
- Draught: 21 ft (6.4 m)
- Propulsion: Eight Admiralty 3-drum boilers; Four shaft Parsons geared turbines; 80,000 shp (60,000 kW)
- Speed: 32 knots (59.3 km/h)
- Range: 2,546 nmi (4,715 km) at 31.5 knots, 10,862 nmi (20,116 km) at 12 knots; 3,210 tons fuel oil
- Complement: 650 (peace), 820 (war)
- Armament: Original configuration: 8 × 8 in (203 mm) dual guns, 4 × 4 in (102 mm) single AA guns, 4 × 2 pdr (40 mm) single pom-poms, 2 × 2-pdr (40 mm) quad pom-poms, 2 × 0.5 in MG quadruple Vickers machine gun mount, 2 × quadruple 21 in (533 mm) torpedo tubes.
- Armour: 1 to 4 in magazine box protection, 1.375 in deck, 1 in side-plating, turrets and bulkheads, 4 internal boiler room sides (added 1936–1940).
- Aircraft carried: One aircraft, later three. One catapult.

HMS Sussex was one of the London sub-class of the County-class heavy cruisers in the Royal Navy. She was laid down by R. and W. Hawthorn, Leslie and Company, Limited, at Hebburn-on-Tyne on 1 February 1927, launched on 22 February 1928 and completed on 19 March 1929.

== Career ==
=== Mediterranean, Australia and Spanish Civil War ===
Sussex served in the Mediterranean until 1934, when she was sent to serve with the Royal Australian Navy while HMAS Australia operated with the Mediterranean Fleet. Sussex's exchange tour concluded in 1936, and then she resumed her presence in the Mediterranean until 1939. During this tour of duty, she defended neutral shipping along the eastern Spanish coast in the last days of the Spanish Civil War, supported by the destroyers HMS Intrepid and HMS Impulsive. She obtained the release of at least four British cargo ships arrested by Spanish nationalist forces in open seas, but the cruiser was unable to prevent the capture of the London-registered freighter Stangate by the nationalist merchant raider Mar Negro off Valencia on 16 March 1939.

=== Second World War service ===
==== Atlantic theatre ====
In September 1939 she operated with Force H in the South Atlantic and Indian Ocean during the search for the enemy German raider Admiral Graf Spee. On 2 December she and the battlecruiser HMS Renown intercepted the German passenger ship Watussi. Before the German ship could be captured she was scuttled by her own crew. Following the scuttling of Admiral Graf Spee in December 1939, Sussex returned to the UK, and served with the Home Fleet during the Norwegian Campaign. She entered refit at Liverpool in March 1940 and in May after sea trials joined 1st Cruiser Squadron in Scapa Flow where she was deployed in search patrols and convoy duties. In August her crew detected a defect with her propulsion machinery so she was sent to Glasgow for repairs to her turbine blades, but while undergoing work, was struck by bombs on 18 September 1940. These caused serious fires, gutting the aft end, and she settled on the bottom with a heavy list. She needed extensive repairs and did not return to service until August 1942.

During these repairs at Stephen's shipyards, Govan she was fitted with new radar equipment, fire control equipment, ten Oerlikon 20 mm cannon and two eight-barreled Pom Pom Guns. Having returned to her squadron in Scapa flow for more interception duties and exercises she was then sent for another refit in November, this time at the Tyne shipyard.

==== Indian Ocean ====
Having spent January 1943 back with the 1st Cruiser Squadron, Sussex then took passage to Mombasa and was redeployed with the 4th Cruiser Squadron of the Eastern Fleet in the Indian Ocean. On her way she intercepted and sank the German tanker Hohenfriedburg just south west of Cape Finisterre on 26 February but was then attacked by German submarine U-264. Sussex avoided the four torpedoes fired at her.

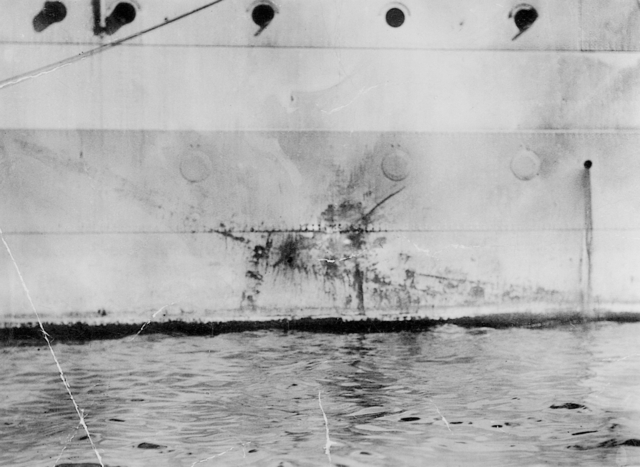
26 July 1945 Imprint of a Japanese kamikaze aircraft on the side of HMS Sussex

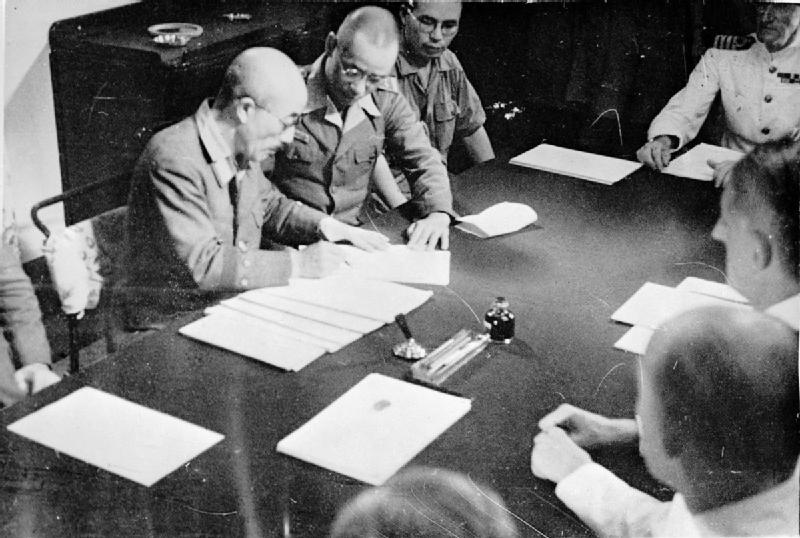
General Itagaki signs the surrender of Singapore on board HMS Sussex

==== Pacific theatre ====
Sussex spent 1944 in the Pacific, and covered operations in the Netherlands East Indies following the cessation of hostilities. On 26 July 1945 her Task Force was attacked by two attack bombers acting as kamikaze suicide weapons. One made an imprint on the side of Sussex, from which it could be identified as a Mitsubishi Ki-51 "Sonia". On Wednesday, 5 September 1945 at 11:30 am, HMS Sussex entered Singapore Harbour carrying the Flag of the Rear-Admiral Cedric Holland. General Seishirō Itagaki, the commander of the garrison at Singapore was brought on board, where he signed the formal surrender of the army, thus completing Operation Tiderace, the Allied plan to recapture Singapore.

=== Decommissioning ===
HMS Sussex was paid off in 1949, handed over to the British Iron & Steel Corporation on 3 January 1950, and arrived at Dalmuir in Scotland on 23 February 1950 where she was broken up by W. H. Arnott, Young and Company, Limited.
