= County-class cruiser =

Class of heavy cruisers built for the Royal Navy of the United Kingdom

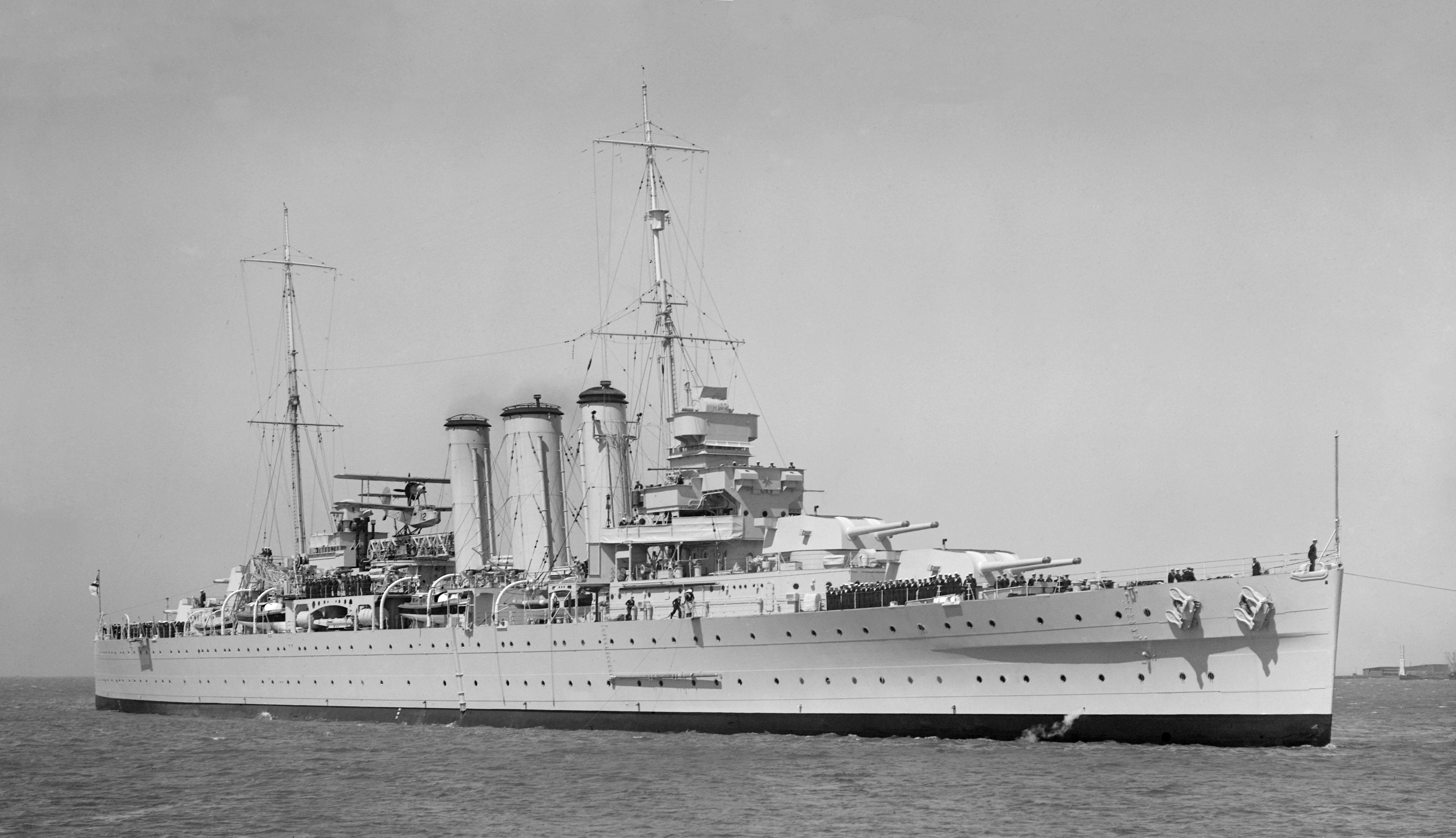
- HMAS Australia in 1937

Class overview
- Name: County class
- Builders: Chatham Dockyard (1); Devonport Dockyard (2); Fairfields (2); John Brown (2); Portsmouth Dockyard (3); Hawthorn Leslie (1); Vickers Armstrongs (1); William Beardmore (1)
- Operators: Royal Navy; Royal Australian Navy
- Preceded by: Hawkins class
- Succeeded by: York class
- Subclasses: Kent, London, Norfolk
- In commission: 1928–1959
- Planned: 16
- Completed: 13
- Cancelled: 3
- Lost: 3
- Retired: 10

General characteristics Kent class
- Type: Heavy cruiser
- Displacement: 10,400 tons average standard; 14,150 tons average full load
- Length: 590 ft (180 m) p/p; 630 ft (190 m) (o/a)
- Beam: 68 ft (21 m) across bulges
- Draught: 17.25 ft (5.26 m) standard; 21.5 ft (6.6 m) full load
- Propulsion: 8 × Admiralty three-drum boilers, Parsons (Brown-Curtis in Berwick) geared steam turbines on 4 shafts, 80,000 shp (60,000 kW)
- Speed: 31.5 knots (58.3 km/h; 36.2 mph)
- Range: 8,000 nautical miles (15,000 km; 9,200 mi) at 10 knots (19 km/h; 12 mph); 2,300 nautical miles (4,300 km; 2,600 mi) at 30 knots (56 km/h; 35 mph)
- Complement: 685 standard, 710 as flagship, 784 during wartime
- Armament: 8 × BL 8-inch (203 mm L/50) Mk.VIII guns in twin mounts Mk.I; 4 × QF 4-inch (102 mm) L/45 Mk.V guns in single mounts HA Mk.III; 8 × QF 2-pounder (40 mm) L/39 Mk.VIII guns in quad mounts HA Mk.VII (from 1925–); except Berwick; 16 in oct mounts Mk.VIII; 8 × 0.5-inch (12.7 mm L/50) Mk.III machine guns in quad mounts Mk.I (from 1924–); 8 × 21-inch (533 mm) torpedoes in quad mounts (removed from 1935–)
- Armour: Main belt: 4.5-inch (114 mm) with 1-inch (25 mm) closing bulkheads (Berwick, Cumberland, Suffolk, Kent & Cornwall only, from 1935–); Lower deck: 1.25-inch (32 mm) over machinery; 1.5-inch (38 mm) over steering gear; Main box citadels: 1–4-inch (25–102 mm) sides; 1-to-2.5-inch (25 to 64 mm) crowns; Turrets: 1-inch (25 mm) faces, sides, rears, crowns & barbettes

General characteristics London class
- Displacement: 9,840 tons standard average; 13,315 tons full load
- Length: 595 ft (181 m) p/p; 632 ft 9 in (192.86 m) o/a
- Beam: 66 ft (20 m)
- Draught: 17 ft (5.2 m) standard; 21 ft 6 in (6.55 m)
- Speed: 32.25 knots (59.73 km/h; 37.11 mph)
- Complement: 700 standard, 852 during war
- Armament: 8 × BL 8-inch (203 mm) L/50 Mk.VIII guns in twin mounts Mk.I*; 4–8 × QF 4-inch (102 mm) L/45 Mk.V guns in single mounts HA Mk.III; 4 × QF 2-pounder (40 mm) L/39 Mk.II guns in single mounts HA Mk.I; 8 × 0.5-inch (12.7 mm) L/50 Mk.III machine guns in quad mounts Mk.I; 8 × 21-inch (533 mm) torpedoes in quad mounts
- Armour: Main belt: 3.5-inch (89 mm) with 1-inch (25 mm) closing bulkheads (London only, from 1938–)
- Notes: Other characteristics as per Kent

General characteristics Norfolk class
- Displacement: 10,400 tons standard; 13,775 tons full load
- Length: 595 ft 1 in (181.38 m) p/p; 632 ft 9 in (192.86 m) o/a
- Beam: 66 ft (20 m)
- Draught: 18 ft (5.5 m) standard; 21 ft 6 in (6.55 m)
- Complement: 710 standard, 819 during wartime
- Armament: 8 × BL 8-inch (203 mm L/50) Mk.VIII guns in twin mounts Mk.II; 8 × QF 4-inch (102 mm L/45) Mk.XVI guns in twin mounts HA/LA Mk.XIX (from 1937–); 16 × QF 2-pounder (40 mm L/39) Mk.VIII guns in oct mounts HA Mk.VIII
- Notes: Other characteristics as per London

The County class was a class of heavy cruisers built for the Royal Navy and Royal Australian Navy in the years between the First and Second World Wars. They were the first 'post-war' cruisers constructed for the Royal Navy and were designed within the limits of the Washington Naval Treaty of 1922. Such ships, with a limit of 10,000 tons standard displacement and 8-inch calibre main guns may be referred to as "treaty cruisers" (the term "heavy cruiser" was not defined until the London Naval Treaty of 1930).

The thirteen Counties were built in the Kent, London and Norfolk sub-classes. They were the only 10,000-ton 8-inch gun, or "A", cruisers that the Royal Navy built. The Counties are remembered for their distinctive three-funnel layout and service in all the major naval theatres of the Second World War.

To extract more ships from the treaty limits, the navy planned to construct 8,250-ton "B" ships, six of which could be built in place of five Counties. The extra ship that this afforded was an attractive proposition for a navy that had the immense peacetime commitments of empire. Peacetime economies and politics intervened and only two B-type cruisers were built, an 8-inch gun modified County design: the York class.

In 1929, the mean cost of each "A" ship was estimated to be £2,180,000, whilst the mean cost of each "B" ship was estimated to be £1,800,000.

== Design and development ==
The design of the class was led by Charles Lillicrap, a member of the Royal Corps of Naval Constructors, working in the naval construction department of the Admiralty. He was the lead designer for RN cruisers of the 1920s. He created a range of studies with eight or ten guns, differing schemes of protection and different speeds.

The 10,000-ton treaty cruisers were the first type of warships built to internationally agreed restrictions. These restrictions posed new engineering challenges and forced compromises upon designers in how to extract the best balance of speed, armament and protection. The United States Navy adopted a design with triple-gun turrets, allowing the hull to be shortened thus saving weight that could be put into protection. This approach required increased power, as the speed of a ship is a function of the ratio of length to beam. The Royal Navy had a requirement for a vessel for colonial trade route defence, which required a good cruising range and speed and independent fighting power. This determined the need for a long hull and the use of four twin-gun turrets, with any remaining displacement invested in protection.

The design was conservative in nature, especially when compared to the contemporary Nelson-class battleships built to satisfy the same treaty. The long (630 feet overall) hull was flush decked and with a high freeboard and was strongly built. This afforded high initial stability, which contributed to the protection scheme. The machinery spaces followed the traditional layout of boiler rooms ahead of engine rooms, separated by an amidships magazine. The two boiler rooms exhausted into four uptakes, the central pair being combined to form a thickened central funnel. The three-funnel design was handsome but a somewhat impractical use of internal space.

As had been tested in the First World War Emerald class cruiser HMS Enterprise, whose completion had been delayed post-war, the Counties featured a new design of forward superstructure incorporating the navigating bridge, wheelhouse, signalling and compass platforms and gunnery director in a block. This advance considerably rationalised the separate armoured conning tower and myriad of decks and platforms of older designs. Moving the fire-control equipment from the mast negated the need for a heavy tripod and light pole masts sufficed for signalling yards and the spread of wireless antennae.

=== Armament ===
The guns, BL 8-inch (203 mm) Mark VIII, were equally disposed in superfiring twin turrets fore and aft. The turret design was needlessly complicated by the original requirement that they should be capable of anti-aircraft fire and were thus provided with a maximum elevation of 70°, despite the inability to train and elevate sufficiently quickly to track aerial targets and the complete lack of a suitable fire control system.

Secondary armament consisted of four QF 4-inch (102 mm) Mark V guns in single mounts HA Mk.III fed from the amidships magazine. There were quadruple-tube torpedo launchers, one each side, amidships. The single 4-inch Mk V guns were later replaced by Mk XVI guns in paired mountings. In a fruitless attempt to keep within treaty limits, the Mark XVI mounting was stripped down to reduce the weight, the result being the Mark XVII, an exercise described as "ridiculous punctiliousness". They were later converted back to standard Mark XVI mounts. The initial design called for two octuple mountings for the 40 mm QF 2-pounder Mk.VIII anti-aircraft autocannon but as a weight-saving exercise these were not initially shipped and the existing QF 2-pounder Mark II was carried in lieu on four single mounts. Space was provided for a rotating catapult and a crane for operating aircraft, although again these were initially not provided.

=== Protection ===
The initial design left little weight to distribute amongst protection. Thus, the traditional side-belt of armour was dispensed with and the 1-inch (25 mm) side plating was sufficient to only give protection against shell splinters. A 1.25-inch (32 mm) protective deck covered the machinery spaces and there were "box citadels" protecting the magazines and shell rooms; 2.5-inch (64 mm) crowns and 4-inch (102 mm) sides, closed by 2.5-inch bulkheads. The aft box citadel had slightly reduced thicknesses at the ends and the citadel amidships had thinner armour as it lay within the confines of the armoured deck and side plating. There was a 1.5-inch (38 mm) arch over the steering gear closed by a 1-inch-thick forward bulkhead. The turrets and barbettes received only thin splinter plating, as did the compass platform. There were external bulges to provide torpedo protection.

== Differences and modifications ==
=== Kent class ===
Originally planned as a programme of 17 Royal Navy vessels, the numbers were cut back significantly following the formation of the first Labour Government after the election of December 1923. Of the eight ships planned to begin construction in 1924, only five were approved, with a further two ordered later by the Royal Australian Navy.

These initial seven ships – Berwick, Cornwall, Cumberland, Kent, and Suffolk, built for the Royal Navy, and Australia and Canberra for the Royal Australian Navy – formed the Kent class. All were ordered in 1924 and commissioned in 1928. It was quickly found necessary to heighten the funnels by some 15 feet (4.6 m) to clear the flue gasses from the aft superstructure. The Australian ships, Australia and Canberra had them raised a further 3 feet (0.91 m). Between 1930 and 1933 the aircraft and catapult were added, as was a high-angle HACS director for the 4-inch guns. Kent received an additional pair of 4-inch guns in 1934, and she, Berwick and Cornwall each received a pair of QF 0.5-inch Vickers machine guns added abreast the fore funnel.

By the mid-1930s, the British Kents were due for modernisation. However, there was little surplus weight for the designers to work with while remaining within the Treaty requirements; they were between 150 and 250 tons under the treaty limits and it was estimated that a further 200-odd tons could be gained through various savings. A 6-foot-deep (1.8 m) armoured belt, 4.5-inch (110 mm) thick, was added amidships, extending down from the armoured deck to 1 foot below the waterline. Cumberland and Suffolk had the aft superstructure razed and replaced by a large hangar for two aircraft and a fixed athwartships catapult. A crane was fitted on either side of the after funnel, and the rear gunnery, navigation and control positions were relocated to the hangar roof. The single 2-pounder guns were removed, and quadruple mountings, Mark VII, were added on either side of the bridge. The 4-inch guns were relocated, and the rearmost pair were replaced by twin mountings Mark XIX for the QF 4-inch Mark XVI. To keep weight within acceptable margins, the hull was cut down by one deck aft of "Y" turret. Berwick and Cornwall were similarly converted, but with more weight in hand the hull was not cut down; all four 4-inch mounts were twins and the 2-pounder guns were octuple mounts. By 1939, the torpedo tubes had been removed in all four ships.

Kent had less weight available for improvements and therefore was not given such an extensive modernisation. While she received the 4-inch armour belt and the double 4-inch gun mounts like her sisters, she retained the rotating catapult and after superstructure, with an additional fire-control position mounted on a distinctive lattice structure aft. Her anti-aircraft armaments were improved as for her sisters, but the multiple 2-pounders and their directors were carried aft, by the lattice structure. The naval historian H. Trevor Lenton estimates that despite the best attempts, none of these ships stayed within the treaty limits; Kent's full load displacement was 14,197 tons, indicating a standard displacement of around 10,600 tons. Lenton expresses doubts whether the Admiralty ever informed the Government of these excesses, as with war imminent, "there were more pressing demands on their time". Another historian, Leo Marriott, gives an alternative displacement of 10,300 tons and notes that it was "unofficially accepted" by the UK, USA, Italy, France and Japan that refits could allow ships to exceed the London treaty limits by up to 300 tons.

=== London class ===
The second group, the four ships of the London class (Devonshire, London, Shropshire and Sussex), closely followed the design of the Kents. The external bulges were not present, reducing the beam by 2 feet (0.61 m), and the hull was lengthened by 2 feet 9 inches (0.84 m); these changes translated into a 3/4-knot increase in speed. To remedy the loss of the bulge protection, there was a second skin of inner plating to provide the same effect. The bridge was moved aft to lessen the effects of muzzle blast from B turret when the guns were trained abaft the beam. They had heightened funnels as built. The aircraft and catapult had been fitted by 1932.

In all ships but Sussex, four 4-inch guns were added in single mountings abreast the funnels. The single 2-pounder guns were removed, and two quadruple mounts for 0.5-inch Vickers machine guns were added. Shropshire acquired an additional anti-aircraft fire control director. Early in the war, the additional 4-inch guns were removed, and the original 4-inch guns altered to the Mark XVI twin mounts. The octuple 2-pounder guns that had originally been designed in were also finally added.

From 1938 to 1941, London received an altogether more comprehensive modernisation. Her upperworks were removed and replaced by new fore and aft superstructures and two upright funnels modelled on the contemporary Crown Colony-class cruisers. The forward superstructure block incorporated a large hangar opening onto an athwartships catapult between the superstructure blocks. There was a catapult on either side of the after funnel. The 4-inch anti-aircraft guns were replaced by twin mountings and relocated to the after superstructure, with the torpedoes a deck below. The 2-pounder guns were carried on the hangar roof and the multiple Vickers guns mounted, one each, on the roofs of "B" and "X" turrets. A 3.5-inch (89 mm) belt, 8 feet (2.4 m) deep, was added abreast the machinery spaces, extending up to the armoured deck. However, the hull had originally been carefully designed to reduce weight based on the initial arrangements. The modifications to London added heavy weights fore and aft and severely overstressed the hull. As a result cracks and loose rivets began to appear on the upper deck. The upper deck was reinforced, which caused the stress to be transmitted through the lower hull instead and cracks began to appear under the waterline. It took underwater reinforcements and refits extending into 1943 to remedy the situation.

The outbreak of war prevented what had ended up being a rather fruitless cosmetic rebuild being extended to the rest of her sisters, as had originally been intended. The remaining Londons thus never received side armouring or the improved aircraft complement.

During wartime refits, the last three Londons underwent similar alterations as the Kents did, having their eight 21-inch (533 mm) torpedo tubes removed, and "X" 8-inch (203 mm) turret removed, although both London and Shropshire retained it. Shropshire, unlike her two un-converted sisters retained her torpedo armament, and was transferred to the Royal Australian Navy in early 1943 to replace Canberra.

=== Norfolk class ===
The final pair of Counties – Norfolk and Dorsetshire – formed the Norfolk class. Another two ships that had been deferred from the 1927–1928 and 1928–1929 programmes – to have been named Northumberland and Surrey – were ordered on 15 May 1929, but suspended on 23 August and finally cancelled on 14 January 1930. A proposed fifth vessel of the sub-class was also cancelled. This was due to the change in administration in 1929 that ushered in a minority Labour government under Ramsay MacDonald. The new government cancelled the ships as an economy measure and as a gesture to the forthcoming London Naval Conference 1930.

The Norfolks were repeats of the Londons with minor alterations. The bridge and after superstructure were lowered. The 8-inch gun mountings were Mark II variants that simplified loading but ended up being heavier than the Mark I variant. The 4-inch guns were relocated forwards in order that they did not obstruct the catapult and aircraft which had been mounted lower down than in their predecessors. During 1937, the 4-inch guns were replaced by twins, octuple 2-pounders were added around the after superstructure and the single guns forward were removed. These improvements pushed the standard displacement over 10,400 tons.

During the war, UP rocket launchers were initially added, but they were later removed along with the Vickers guns. These were replaced by the altogether more useful 20 mm Oerlikon gun. An additional director for the 4-inch guns was added, and the pole masts were replaced by tripods to support the additional weight of masthead electronics. Dorsetshire was sunk in 1942, and so it was only Norfolk that underwent a refit in 1944, during which her aircraft, catapult and X turret were removed. This allowed four quadruple 2-pounder mounts and their directors and four single 40 mm Bofors guns to be added. An extra superstructure was added aft to carry barrage directors, fitted with radar Type 283, which finally allowed the main armament to serve in its intended anti-aircraft role.

It was intended for Surrey and Northumberland to have a modified design, more heavily armoured but 2 knots (3.7 km/h; 2.3 mph) slower.

=== Comparison of classes ===
Class comparison
Class	Number built & planned	Ordered	Length	Beam	Speed (full load)	Displacement (standard, long tons)	Main armament	Belt armour	Torpedo tubes	Complement
Kent	7 of 10	1924	630 ft (190 m)	68 ft (21 m)	31 1/2 kn	10,570	8 × 8-inch	4.5 in (114 mm) (Note: Post 1935 refit, not in Canberra)	8	685
London	4 of 4	1925–1926	632 3/4 ft (192.9 m)	66 ft (20 m)	32 1/4 kn	9,830	8 × 8-inch	3.5 in (89 mm) (Note: Post 1938 rebuild, London only)	8	700
Norfolk	2 of 5	1926–1927	632 3/4 ft (192.9 m)	66 ft (20 m)	32 1/4 kn	10,300	8 × 8-inch	3.5 in (89 mm)	8	725
York	2 of 5	1926–1928	575 ft (175 m)	58 ft (18 m)	31 1/2 kn	8,250	6 × 8-inch	3 in (76 mm)	6	623

== Ships ==
County-class ships of the Royal Navy
Ship	Pennant	Subclass	Builder	Laid down	Launched	Completed	Fate
Berwick	65	Kent	Fairfield Shipbuilding & Engineering Company, Govan	15 Sep 1924	30 Mar 1926	15 Feb 1928	Broken up at Blyth, 1948
Cumberland	57	Kent	Vickers-Armstrongs, Barrow in Furness	18 Oct 1924	16 Mar 1926	21 Jan 1928	Broken up at Newport, 1959
Suffolk	55	Kent	HM Dockyard Portsmouth	30 Sep 1924	16 Feb 1926	31 May 1928	Broken up at Newport, 1948
Kent	54	Kent	HM Dockyard Chatham	15 Nov 1924	16 Mar 1926	22 Jun 1928	Broken up at Troon, 1948
Cornwall	56	Kent	HM Dockyard Devonport	9 Oct 1924	11 Mar 1926	10 May 1928	Sunk by Japanese aircraft in "Easter Sunday Raid" south of Ceylon, 5 Apr 1942
London	69	London	HM Dockyard, Portsmouth	23 Feb 1926	14 Sep 1927	31 Jan 1929	Broken up at Barrow-in-Furness, 1950
Devonshire	39	London	HM Dockyard, Devonport	16 Mar 1926	22 Oct 1927	18 Mar 1929	Broken up at Newport, 1954
Sussex	96	London	Hawthorn Leslie & Company, Hebburn	1 Feb 1927	22 Feb 1928	19 Mar 1929	Broken up at Dalmuir, 1950
Shropshire	73	London	William Beardmore & Company, Dalmuir	24 Feb 1927	5 Jul 1928	12 Sep 1929	To RAN 1943; Broken up at Troon, 1954
Norfolk	78	Norfolk	Fairfield Shipbuilding & Engineering Company, Govan	8 Jul 1927	12 Dec 1928	1 May 1930	Broken up at Newport, 1950
Dorsetshire	40	Norfolk	HM Dockyard, Portsmouth	21 Sep 1927	24 Jan 1929	30 Sep 1930	Sunk by Japanese aircraft in "Easter Sunday Raid" south of Ceylon, 5 Apr 1942
Surrey	n/a	Norfolk	HM Dockyard, Devonport	Cancelled 14 Jan 1930			
Northumberland	n/a	Norfolk	HM Dockyard, Portsmouth	Cancelled 14 Jan 1930			
Not named	n/a	Norfolk	—	Cancelled 14 Jan 1930			

Kent-class ships of the Royal Australian Navy
Ship	Pennant	Builder	Laid down	Launched	Completed	Fate
Australia	I84	John Brown & Company, Clydebank	9 Jun 1925	17 Mar 1927	24 Apr 1928	Broken up at Barrow-in-Furness, 1955
Canberra	I85	John Brown & Company, Clydebank	9 Sep 1925	31 May 1927	10 Jul 1928	Crippled by torpedoes, possibly friendly fire, at Battle of Savo Island 9 Aug 1942; subsequently abandoned and scuttled

== Service ==
The County class saw much service during the Second World War. Norfolk and Suffolk were equipped with radar which was used to good advantage when they shadowed the German battleship Bismarck during the RN's attempts to hunt her down after the sinking of HMS Hood.

The class saw service in nearly every theatre of the war. Norfolk, Suffolk, and Dorsetshire were involved in the pursuit of Bismarck and Prinz Eugen. Berwick fought a gunnery action with the German cruiser Admiral Hipper, and Norfolk again fought German Navy surface units during Battle of the North Cape. Suffolk and Sussex suffered bomb damage from Luftwaffe aircraft, and both required substantial repairs. Three of the class were lost, with Canberra being hit by torpedoes, possibly friendly fire, at the Battle of Savo Island then scuttled by a US destroyer, and Cornwall and Dorsetshire both bombed and sunk by Japanese carrier-borne aircraft during the Indian Ocean raid.

The survivors began decommissioning in 1948, and were all decommissioned by the mid-1950s, except Cumberland, which was an armaments trials ship testing the automatic 6-inch and 3-inch guns that would be fitted to the Tiger class. She was scrapped in 1959.

== Canarias class ==
Two ships based on the County class, Canarias and Baleares of the Canarias class, were designed in the UK and constructed in Spain by the Vickers-Armstrongs subsidiary Sociedad Española de Construcción Naval. Completed in the late 1930s for the Spanish Navy, they saw service during the Spanish Civil War. Although they shared a common hull, machinery and main armament, the Spanish ships had a notably different appearance, with an enormous single funnel – though Canarias received two funnels in a later refit – and an equally tall forward superstructure.

== Bibliography ==
- Chesneau, Roger, ed. (1980). Conway's All the World's Fighting Ships 1922–1946. New York: Mayflower Books. ISBN 0-8317-0303-2.
  - Campbell, N. J. M. "Great Britain". In Chesneau (1980), pp. 2–85.
- Campbell, John (2002). Naval Weapons of World War Two. London: Conway Maritime. ISBN 0-85177-924-7.
- Friedman, Norman (2010). British Cruisers: Two World Wars and After. Barnsley, UK: Seaforth Publishing. ISBN 978-1-59114-078-8.
- Lenton, H. T. (1998). British & Empire Warships of the Second World War. Annapolis, Maryland: Naval Institute Press. ISBN 1-55750-048-7.
- Marriot, Leo (2005). Treaty Cruisers: The First International Warship Building Competition. Barnsley, UK: Pen & Sword Maritime. ISBN 9781783409761.
- Raven, Alan & Roberts, John (1980). British Cruisers of World War Two. Annapolis, Maryland: Naval Institute Press. ISBN 0-87021-922-7.
- Rohwer, Jürgen (2005). Chronology of the War at Sea 1939–1945: The Naval History of World War Two (Third Revised ed.). Annapolis, Maryland: Naval Institute Press. ISBN 1-59114-119-2.
- Sturton, I. A. (1977). "H.M.S. Surrey and H.M.S. Northumberland". Warship International. XIV (3): 243–252. ISSN 0043-0374.
- Whitley, M. J. (1995). Cruisers of World War Two: An International Encyclopedia. London: Cassell. ISBN 1-86019-874-0.
