= HMS Devonshire (39) =

1920s ship in the British Navy

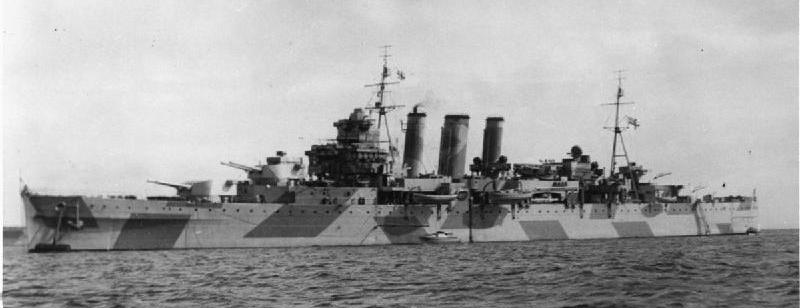
- Devonshire at anchor, 1941

History

United Kingdom
- Name: Devonshire
- Namesake: Devonshire
- Builder: HM Dockyard, Devonport
- Laid down: 16 March 1926
- Launched: 22 October 1927
- Commissioned: 18 March 1929
- Reclassified: Training ship, 1947
- Identification: Pennant number: 39
- Motto: Auxilio Divino: 'By the help of God'
- Fate: Sold for scrap, 16 June 1954
- Badge: On a Field Silver, A Lion rampant Red, armed Blue, crowned Blue

General characteristics (as built)
- Class & type: County-class heavy cruiser
- Displacement: 9,850 long tons (10,010 t) (standard); 13,315 long tons (13,529 t) (deep load)
- Length: 632 ft 8 in (192.8 m)
- Beam: 66 ft (20.1 m)
- Draught: 20 ft 9 in (6.3 m)
- Installed power: 8 × Admiralty 3-drum boilers; 80,000 shp (60,000 kW)
- Propulsion: 4 × shafts, 4 × geared steam turbines
- Speed: 32.25 knots (59.73 km/h; 37.11 mph)
- Range: 12,500 nmi (23,200 km; 14,400 mi) at 12 knots (22 km/h; 14 mph)
- Complement: 784
- Armament: 4 × twin 8 in (203 mm) guns; 4 × single 4 in (102 mm) AA guns; 4 × single 2 pdr (40 mm) AA guns; 2 × quadruple 21 in (533 mm) torpedo tubes
- Armour: Belt: 1 in (25 mm); Decks: 1.375–1.5 in (34.9–38.1 mm); Barbettes: 1 in (25 mm); Turrets: 1 in (25 mm); Bulkheads: 1 in (25 mm); Magazines: 2–4.375 in (50.8–111.1 mm)

HMS Devonshire, pennant number 39, was a County-class heavy cruiser of the London sub-class built for the Royal Navy in the late 1920s. The ship spent most of her pre-World War II career assigned to the Mediterranean Fleet aside from a brief tour with the China Station. She spent the first two months of the Second World War in the Mediterranean until she was transferred to the Home Fleet and became flagship of a cruiser squadron. Devonshire took part in the Norwegian campaign in mid 1940 and evacuated much of the Norwegian government in June. Several months later, she participated in the Battle of Dakar, a failed attempt to seize the Vichy French colony of Senegal in September. The ship remained in the South Atlantic afterwards and supported Free French efforts to take control of French Equatorial Africa in addition to searching for German commerce raiders.

Devonshire returned home in early 1941 and briefly rejoined the Home Fleet, during which time she escorted several aircraft carriers as they attacked German forces in Norway and Finland and covered the first convoy to the Soviet Union. Shortly afterwards, the ship was sent to the South Atlantic where she sank the auxiliary cruiser Atlantis. Devonshire was then assigned to the Eastern Fleet in the Indian Ocean and supported the Allied invasion of Madagascar in mid-1942. She then spent the next year escorting convoys before returning home to begin a lengthy refit. After it was completed in early 1944, the ship escorted various aircraft carriers for the rest of the war as they attacked targets in Norway.

After the German surrender in May 1945, she sailed to Norway and escorted two surrendered German cruisers from Denmark to the UK. Devonshire then began ferrying British troops home from Australia for the rest of the year. In 1947, the ship was converted into a training ship for naval cadets and served until she was sold for scrap in 1954.

== Description ==
Devonshire displaced 9,850 long tons (10,010 t) at standard load and 13,315 long tons (13,529 t) at deep load. The ship had an overall length of 632 feet 8 inches (192.8 m), a beam of 66 feet (20.1 m) and a draught of 20 feet 9 inches (6.3 m). She was powered by Parsons geared steam turbines, driving four shafts, which developed a total of 80,000 shaft horsepower (60,000 kW) and gave a maximum speed of 32.35 knots (59.91 km/h; 37.23 mph). Steam for the turbines was provided by eight Admiralty 3-drum boilers. Devonshire carried a maximum of 3,425 long tons (3,480 t) of fuel oil that gave her a range of 13,300 nautical miles (24,600 km; 15,300 mi) at 12 knots (22 km/h; 14 mph). The ship's complement was 784 officers and men.

The ship mounted eight 8-inch (203 mm) guns in four twin gun turrets, designated 'A', 'B', 'X', and 'Y' from front to rear. Her secondary armament consisted of four QF 4-inch (102 mm) Mk V anti-aircraft (AA) guns in single mounts. Devonshire also mounted four single 2-pounder (40 mm) light AA guns ("pom-poms"). The ship was equipped with two quadruple torpedo tube above-water mounts for 21-inch (533 mm) torpedoes.

Devonshire was only lightly protected with little more than a single inch of plating protecting vital machinery. Her magazines were the exception and were protected by 2–4.375 inches (50.8–111.1 mm) of armour. Space and weight was reserved for one aircraft catapult and its seaplane, but they were not fitted until after she was completed.

== Construction and career ==
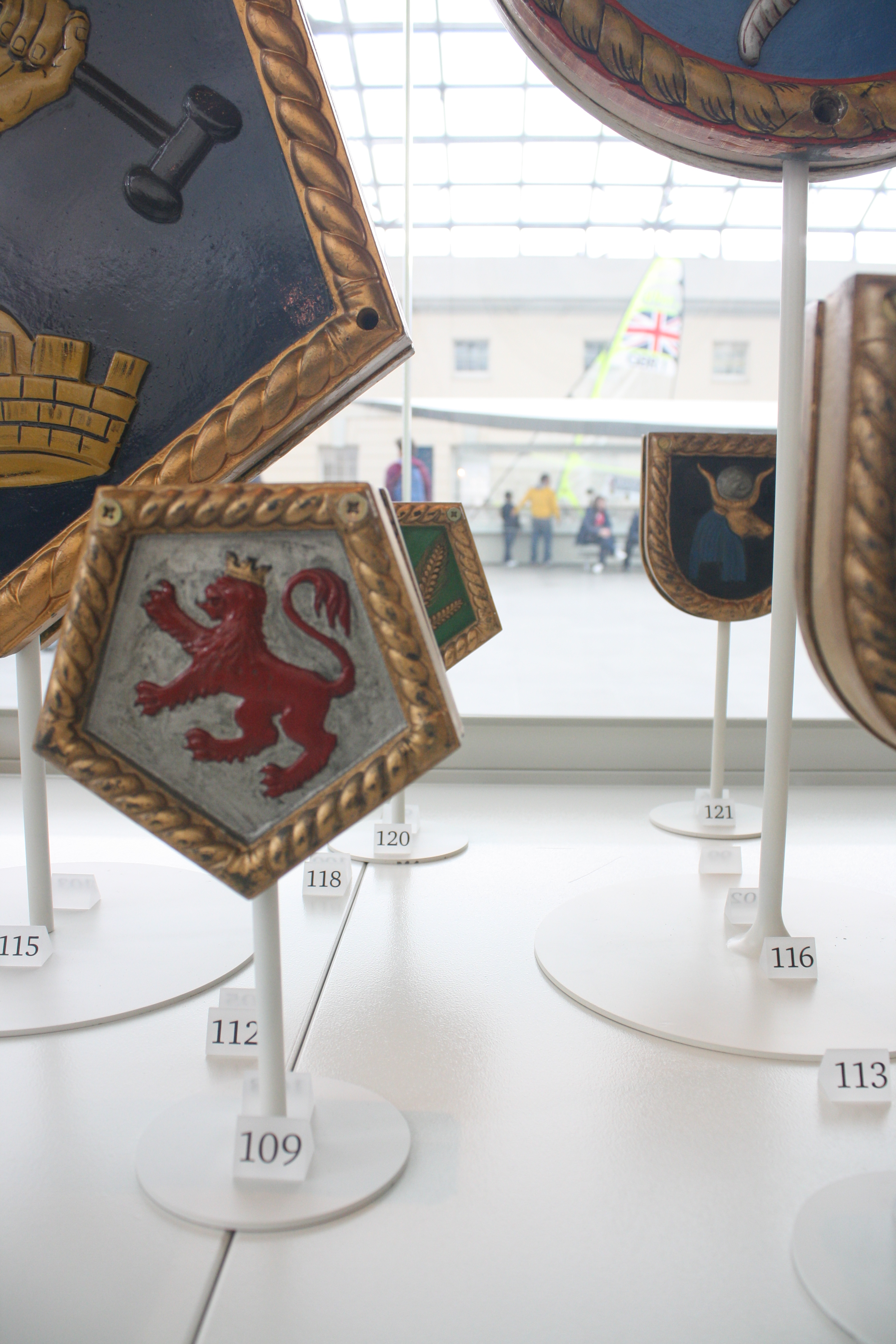
Ship's badge in the National Maritime Museum

Devonshire, the fifth ship of her name to serve in the Royal Navy, was named for the county. The ship was laid down at Devonport Dockyard on 16 March 1926 and was launched on 22 October 1927. Completed on 18 March 1929, she was assigned to the 1st Cruiser Squadron (CS) of the Mediterranean Fleet together with her three sister ships. Devonshire spent the bulk of the interbellum period there, aside from a 1932–33 tour with the China Station.

While off the island of Skiathos in the Aegean, she suffered a serious accident on 26 July 1929 during gunnery training. There was a misfire in the left gun of "X" turret; when the breech block was opened the propellant charge inside the barrel detonated, which ignited the charge for the next round. The ensuing explosion killed 18 men. Devonshire returned to England for repairs in August with "the turret swung 'round and the guns awry". In 1929–1930 she received a High-Angle Control System, used to direct her anti-aircraft guns, and a catapult was fitted in 1931–1932. Four more single four-inch AA guns in addition to a pair of quadruple Vickers .50-calibre (12.7 mm) Mark III machine guns were added in 1936–1937.

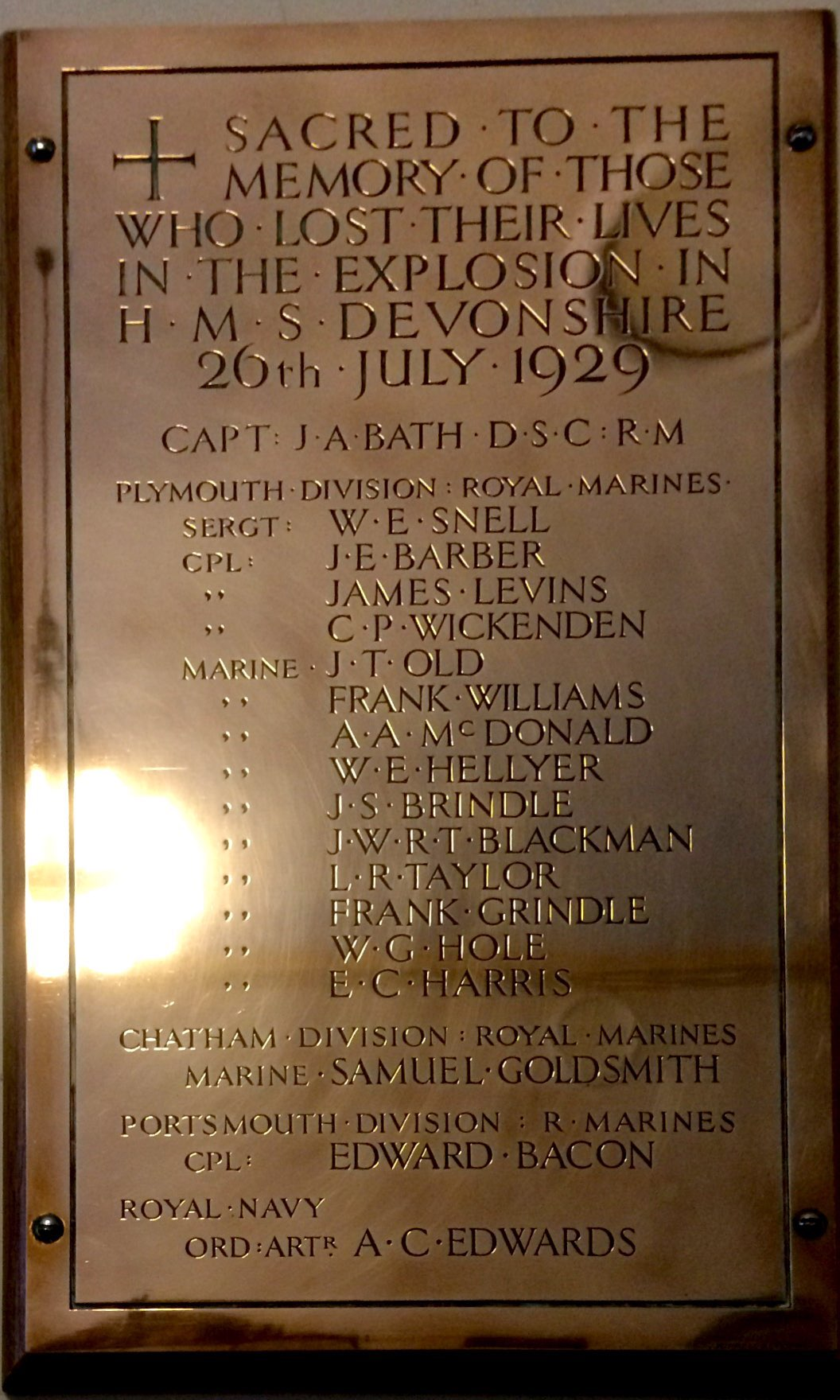
Memorial plaque located at Stonehouse Barracks in memory of those killed in an explosion aboard Devonshire, 29 July 1929

During the Spanish Civil War, Devonshire brought a Nationalist emissary to Menorca on 7 February 1939. The following day, the Republicans surrendered the island to the Nationalists aboard the cruiser and she sailed to Marseille, France, with 452 Republican refugees on board.

=== Second World War ===
Devonshire was in the Mediterranean when the war began in September 1939 until she was transferred to the Home Fleet some months later. After the armed merchant cruiser Rawalpindi was sunk by the German battleships Scharnhorst and Gneisenau on 23 November, Devonshire and the battleships Nelson and Rodney sailed from the Clyde on a fruitless attempt to find the German ships. In March 1940 she became the flagship of the 1st CS, and flew the flag of the future First Sea Lord, Vice-Admiral John H. D. Cunningham. During this time the squadron was tasked to cover Scotland, the Faeroe Islands and Iceland. As part of the Allied plans to occupy parts of Norway and interdict the iron ore traffic from Narvik to Germany (Operation Wilfred and Plan R 4), Devonshire and the rest of the squadron were assigned to ferry British troops from Rosyth to Stavanger and Bergen and to be ready to sail on the morning of 8 April, but these plans were partially preempted by the German invasion that same day.

==== Norwegian campaign ====
The Admiralty ordered that the troops, but not their equipment, be unloaded from the cruisers on the evening of the 8th, and that the cruisers were to search forthwith for the German ships known to be at sea. This was later cancelled and the squadron was ordered to rendezvous with the main body of the Home Fleet. Later that day, German bombers attacked the British ships and Devonshire suffered a near-miss. On the 11th, the squadron was detached on an unsuccessful search for German ships in the area around Trondheim and rejoined the fleet two days later. Cunningham's ships were then detached to Tromsø where he conducted negotiations with local officials to refuel there and to bring Norwegian troops west from Kirkenes. The squadron arrived there on the afternoon of the 15th and escorted Norwegian troopships back to Tromsø. Devonshire covered the evacuation of British and French troops from Namsos at the beginning of May and was nearly hit when the evacuation forces were attacked by German aircraft as they were withdrawing on 3 May.

Devonshire evacuated King Haakon VII, Crown Prince Olav, and Norwegian government officials, including the Prime Minister, Johan Nygaardsvold, from Tromsø on 7 June. On board were 461 passengers. The ship passed within 50 miles (80 km) of the action in which the aircraft carrier Glorious and two destroyers were sunk by Scharnhorst and Gneisenau. Although an enemy sighting report had been received in Devonshire, Cunningham's orders were to get Haakon VII to safety, and the cruiser sped up and continued on her course.

==== Operation Menace ====
In preparation for Operation Menace, a British naval attack on Dakar, Senegal, prior to a planned landing by the Free French, the ship was detached from the Home Fleet on 28 August and was assigned to Force M, the Royal Navy component of the operation. Still Cunningham's flagship, she departed the Clyde on the 31st, escorting the troop convoy en route to Gibraltar where they arrived on 3 September. On the 14th, Cunningham dispatched the 1st CS, augmented by the aircraft carrier Ark Royal, in an unsuccessful attempt to locate and turn back a Vichy French cruiser squadron bound for Dakar; by this time he had hoisted his flag in the battleship Barham. Devonshire and her Australian sister ship Australia engaged the French cruisers and destroyers as they manoeuvred in the harbour on the second day of the battle, with negligible effect in poor visibility. After Barham was lightly damaged during the action, Cunningham transferred back to Devonshire for the next day's battle during which the ship fired 200 shells from her main guns without scoring a single hit against French ships obscured by smoke screens.

After the attack was abandoned, she was employed to escort a British troop convoy to Douala, French Cameroons, in early October and then blockaded the coast of Gabon when Free French forces invaded in early November. On 7 November, her Supermarine Walrus seaplane helped to sink the Vichy submarine Poncelet off Gabon.

==== 1941 ====
Devonshire remained in the South Atlantic and participated in the unsuccessful hunt for the German commerce raider Kormoran in January 1941. The ship subsequently transferred to the Home Fleet and was refitted in Liverpool 19 February–22 May. During this refit her single 2-pounder guns were replaced by two octuple mounts and an early-warning Type 281 radar. She escorted British carriers when they raided Kirkenes and Petsamo in Norway and Finland in late July. The following month, Devonshire provided distant cover for the first convoy to Russia, Operation Dervish, before she was transferred to the Eastern Fleet. Before her departure, the ship received a pair of 20-millimeter (0.8 in) Oerlikon light AA guns in September. On 2 November, the ship led a force that captured a Vichy convoy bound for French Indochina off South Africa. Twenty days later, Devonshire sank a German commerce raider, the auxiliary cruiser Atlantis, north of Ascension Island.

==== 1942–1943 ====
The ship was subsequently refitted in Norfolk, Virginia from 24 January to 7 March 1942, where she received a Type 273 gunnery radar and six more Oerlikons. After the completion of her refit, Devonshire was sent to join the 4th Cruiser Squadron of the Eastern Fleet and escorted a convoy from Charleston, South Carolina, to Freetown, Sierra Leone en route. On 25 April, the ship escorted a convoy from Durban, South Africa to Madagascar as part of Operation Ironclad, which was launched to preempt a possible Japanese occupation of the island. The Vichy French had allowed Japanese forces to use air bases in French Indochina to launch the airstrikes that sank the capital ships Repulse and Prince of Wales, so it was quite possible they would permit the Japanese access to military facilities on Madagascar had they requested them. During late 1942, Devonshire's single four-inch AA guns were replaced with twin-gun mounts for Mark XVI guns of the same calibre. The ship remained in the Far East until May 1943, covering troop convoys from Suez to Australia. By this time, her quadruple .50-calibre machineguns and six single-Oerlikon mounts had been replaced by another pair of octuple two-pounder mounts and a dozen twin-Oerlikon mounts. She returned home that month and began a lengthy refit that lasted until 20 March 1944. During this refit, 'X' turret and one twin Oerlikon mount were replaced by two additional octuple two-pounder mounts and eight single-Oerlikon mounts. Her radar suite was modernized with Type 281B replacing Type 281 and the full range of anti-aircraft gunnery radars were installed. To accommodate all the new equipment, her catapult was removed.

==== 1944–1945 ====
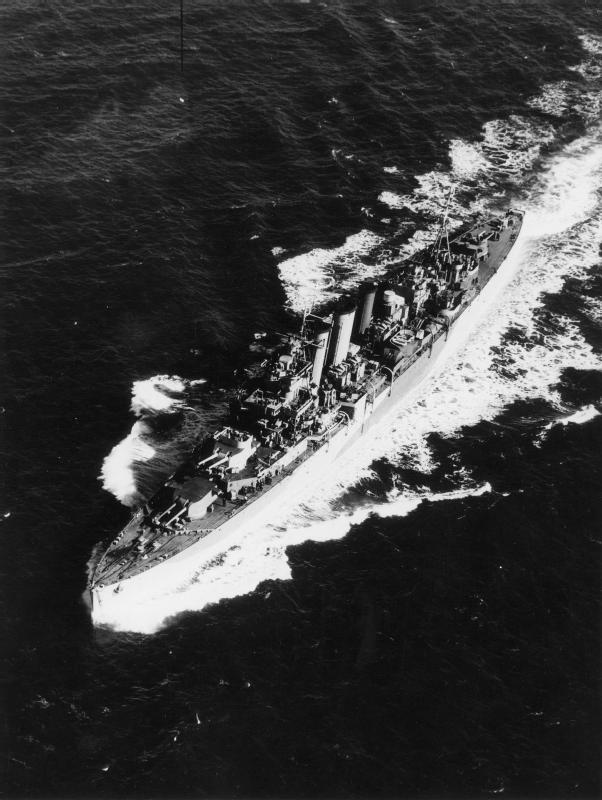
Devonshire underway following her 1944 refit

She returned to duty with the Home Fleet at Scapa Flow in April 1944. From July until the end of hostilities in May 1945, Devonshire escorted the carrier raids that were mounted on shipping and other targets in Norwegian waters (Operations Mascot, Goodwood, and Hardy).

With the end of the war in Europe, Devonshire, now the flagship of Rear-Admiral James Ritchie, the future Flag Officer Norway, sailed on 12 May to Oslo. She then went to Copenhagen the next day, and from there she escorted to the UK the German cruisers Prinz Eugen and Nürnberg to Wilhelmshaven on 24–26 May. In June, Devonshire was again the flagship of the 1st Cruiser Squadron, under the command of Vice-Admiral Rhoderick McGrigor, which returned King Haakon to Norway, arriving in Oslo on 7 June. The king himself sailed in her half-sister, Norfolk. Later that month, she was outfitted for use as a troopship, and she was used to transport personnel to and from Australia for the rest of the year. On 29 September, Devonshire helped to rescued the survivors of SS Empire Patrol, a freighter loaded with Greek refugees bound from Port Said, Egypt, to Greece, that had caught fire.

=== Post-war ===
The ship was converted into a cadet training ship in 1947 and served in this role until 1954. As part of this reconstruction most of her armament was removed; by 1949 it consisted of a single eight-inch gun turret, two four-inch gun turrets and single examples of the quadruple two-pounder, single- and twin-Oerlikon mounts, plus a single 40-millimeter (1.6 in) Bofors light AA gun. In 1953 she took part in the Fleet Review to celebrate the coronation of Elizabeth II. Devonshire was sold for scrap on 16 June 1954 and arrived at Newport, Wales, on 12 December 1954 where she was broken up by John Cashmore Ltd.
