= HMS Cornwall (56) =

County-class heavy cruiser of the Royal Navy

Coordinates: 1°54′N 77°54′E

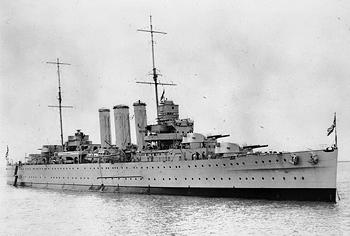
- Cornwall at anchor, 1929

History

United Kingdom
- Name: Cornwall
- Namesake: Cornwall
- Builder: Devonport Dockyard (Plymouth)
- Laid down: 9 October 1924
- Launched: 11 March 1926
- Completed: 8 May 1928
- Identification: Pennant number: 56
- Fate: Sunk by Japanese carrier aircraft, 5 April 1942

General characteristics (as built)
- Class & type: County-class heavy cruiser
- Displacement: 9,850 long tons (10,010 t) (standard); 13,520 long tons (13,740 t) (deep load)
- Length: 630 ft (192.0 m)
- Beam: 68 ft 5 in (20.9 m)
- Draught: 20 ft 6 in (6.2 m)
- Installed power: 80,000 shp (60,000 kW)
- Propulsion: 4 shafts, Parsons geared steam turbines; 8 Admiralty 3-drum water-tube boilers
- Speed: 31.5 knots (58.3 km/h; 36.2 mph)
- Range: 13,300 nmi (24,600 km; 15,300 mi) at 12 knots (22 km/h; 14 mph)
- Complement: 784
- Armament: 4 × twin 8-inch (203 mm) guns; 4 × single QF 4-inch (102 mm) Mk V anti-aircraft (AA) guns; 4 × single 2-pounder (40 mm) AA guns; 2 × quadruple 21 inch (533 mm) torpedo tubes
- Armour: Belt: 1 in (25 mm); Decks: 1.375–1.5 in (34.9–38.1 mm); Barbettes: 1 in (25 mm); Turrets: 1 in (25 mm); Bulkheads: 1 in (25 mm); Magazines: 2–4.375 in (50.8–111.1 mm)

HMS Cornwall, pennant number 56, was a County-class heavy cruiser of the Kent sub-class built for the Royal Navy in the mid-1920s. The ship spent most of her pre-World War II career assigned to the China Station. Shortly after the war began in August 1939, she was assigned to search for German commerce raiders in the Indian Ocean. Cornwall was transferred to the South Atlantic in late 1939 where she escorted convoys before returning to the Indian Ocean in 1941. She then sank the German auxiliary cruiser Pinguin in May. After the start of the Pacific War in December 1941, she began escorting convoys until she was transferred to the Eastern Fleet in March 1942. The ship was sunk on 5 April by dive bombers from three Japanese aircraft carriers during the Indian Ocean Raid.

== Description ==
Cornwall displaced 9,850 long tons (10,010 t) at standard load and 13,520 long tons (13,740 t) at deep load. The ship had an overall length of 630 feet (192.0 m), a beam of 68 feet 5 inches (20.9 m) and a draught of 20 feet 6 inches (6.2 m). She was powered by Parsons geared steam turbines, driving four shafts, which developed a total of 80,000 shaft horsepower (60,000 kW) and gave a maximum speed of 31.5 knots (58.3 km/h; 36.2 mph). Steam for the turbines was provided by eight Admiralty 3-drum boilers. Cornwall carried a maximum of 3,425 long tons (3,480 t) of fuel oil that gave her a range of 13,300 nautical miles (24,600 km; 15,300 mi) at 12 knots (22 km/h; 14 mph). The ship's complement was 784 officers and men.

The ship mounted eight 50-calibre 8-inch (203 mm) guns in four twin gun turrets. Her secondary armament consisted of four QF 4-inch (102 mm) Mk V anti-aircraft (AA) guns in single mounts. Cornwall mounted four single 2-pounder (40 mm) light AA guns ("pom-poms"). The ship carried two quadruple torpedo tube above-water mounts for 21-inch (533 mm) torpedoes.

Cornwall was only lightly protected with little more than an inch of plating protecting vital machinery. Her magazines were the exception and were protected by 2–4.375 inches (50.8–111.1 mm) of armour. Space and weight was reserved for one aircraft catapult and its seaplane, but they were not fitted until after she was completed.

== Construction and career ==
Cornwall, the fifth ship of her name to serve in the Royal Navy, was named after the eponymous county. The ship was laid down at Devonport Dockyard on 9 October 1924 and was launched on 11 March 1926. Completed on 6 December 1927, she was assigned to the 5th Cruiser Squadron (CS) on the China Station and spent the bulk of the interbellum period there. In 1929–30 she received a High-Angle Control System, used to direct her anti-aircraft guns, and a catapult was fitted the following year. Two quadruple Vickers .50-calibre (12.7 mm) Mark III machine guns were added in 1934.

In July 1936, Cornwall returned home to begin a major refit, which included a 4.5-inch (114 mm) Krupp cemented armour belt abreast the engine and boiler rooms as well as the dynamo room and the fire control transmitting station. This belt extended 6 feet (1.8 m) down from the lower deck. Four inches of armour were also added to protect the sides of the boiler room fan compartments. A hangar for her aircraft was added and a new, more powerful catapult was installed. The ship's director was moved to the roof of the hangar and a new power-operated director-control tower was installed in its original location. Her single four-inch AA guns were replaced with twin-gun mounts for Mark XVI guns of the same calibre. Two octuple-barrel 2-pounder mounts were added abreast the searchlight tower and the original 2-pounder guns were removed. The changes raised the ship's displacement by 107 long tons (109 t) and cost an estimated £215,000. After the refit was completed in December 1937, the ship was assigned to the 2nd Cruiser Squadron before rejoining the 5th CS in 1939.

On 5 October 1939, a month after the start of World War II, she was assigned to Force I to hunt for German commerce raiders in the Indian Ocean and spent most of the rest of the year there. Cornwall was then transferred to the South Atlantic for convoy escort duties. On 13 September 1940, the ship rendezvoused with a convoy that was carrying troops intended to capture Dakar from the Vichy French, but was detached to intercept the Vichy French light cruiser Primauguet that was escorting an oil tanker to Libreville, French Equatorial Africa, five days later and forced them to return to Casablanca in French Morocco. She then returned to the Indian Ocean and sank the German commerce raider Pinguin on 8 May 1941. Cornwall rescued 3 officers, 57 ratings and 22 prisoners after the battle.

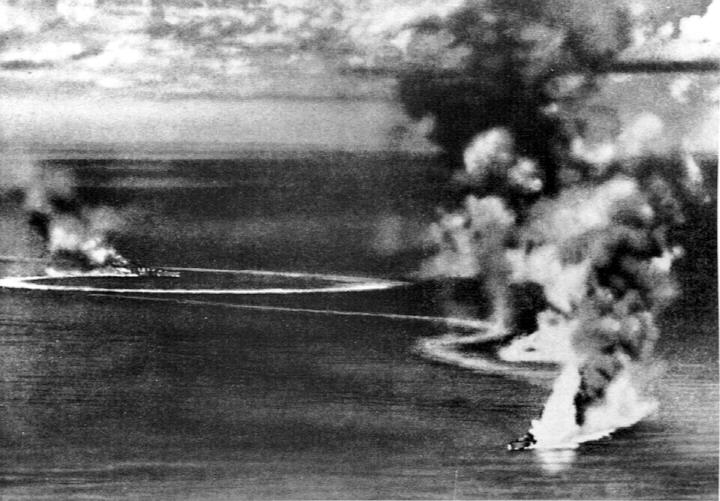
Dorsetshire (background) and Cornwall under air attack by Japanese aircraft, 5 April 1942

After the start of the Pacific War on 7 December, the ship began escorting convoys across the Indian Ocean, examples being Convoy JS.1 from Colombo, Ceylon, to the Dutch East Indies in late January–early February 1942 and the troop Convoy MS. 5 to Australia in early March. Later that month, she was assigned to the fast Force A of the Eastern Fleet. On 2 April, Cornwall and her half sister, Dorsetshire, were detached from the fleet, Dorsetshire to resume an interrupted refit and Cornwall to escort convoy SU-4 (composed of the U.S. Army transport USAT Willard A. Holbrook and Australian transport MV Duntroon) to Australia and the aircraft carrier Hermes to Trincomalee in Ceylon for repairs. On 4 April, the Japanese fleet was spotted and the two cruisers left harbour and, after a hurried refuelling at sea, set out for Addu Atoll shortly after midnight. The following day, the two cruisers were sighted by a spotter plane from the Japanese cruiser Tone about 200 miles (370 km) south-west of Ceylon.

As part of the engagement known as the Easter Sunday Raid, a wave of Aichi D3A dive bombers took off from three Japanese carriers to attack Cornwall and Dorsetshire, 320 kilometres (170 nmi; 200 mi) south-west of Ceylon, and sank the two ships. British losses were 424 men killed; 1,122 survivors spent thirty hours in the water before being rescued by the light cruiser Enterprise and two destroyers.

== Bibliography ==
- Campbell, N.J.M. (1980). "Great Britain". In Chesneau, Roger (ed.). Conway's All the World's Fighting Ships 1922–1946. New York: Mayflower Books. pp. 2–85. ISBN 0-8317-0303-2.
- Colledge, J. J.; Warlow, Ben (2006) [1969]. Ships of the Royal Navy: The Complete Record of All Fighting Ships of the Royal Navy from the 15th Century to the Present (3rd Rev ed.). London: Chatham Publishing. ISBN 978-1-86176-281-8. OCLC 67375475.
- Dimbleby, Ken (1984). Turns of Fate: The Drama of HMS Cornwall 1939–1942. London: William Kimber. ISBN 0-7183-0523-X.
- Friedman, Norman (2010). British Cruisers: Two World Wars and After. Barnsley, UK: Seaforth Publishing. ISBN 978-1-59114-078-8.
- Gill, G. Hermon (1957). "Chapter 15: ABDA and ANZAC" (PDF). Australia in the War of 1939–1945: Series Two Navy: Volume I: The Royal Australian Navy, 1939–1942. Canberra, Australia: Australian War Memorial. pp. 513–72. OCLC 848228.
- Gill, G. Hermon (1968). "Chapter 1 – Shaping Japan's Perimeter". Australia in the War of 1939–1945: Series Two Navy: Volume II: The Royal Australian Navy, 1942–1945 (PDF). Canberra, Australia: Australian War Memorial. pp. 1–24.
- Raven, Alan & Roberts, John (1980). British Cruisers of World War Two. Annapolis, Maryland: Naval Institute Press. ISBN 0-87021-922-7.
- Rohwer, Jürgen (2005). Chronology of the War at Sea 1939–1945: The Naval History of World War Two (Third Revised ed.). Annapolis, Maryland: Naval Institute Press. ISBN 1-59114-119-2.
- Whitley, M. J. (1995). Cruisers of World War Two: An International Encyclopedia. London: Cassell. ISBN 1-86019-874-0.
