= HMS Shropshire =

Heavy cruiser of the London sub-class of County-class cruisers

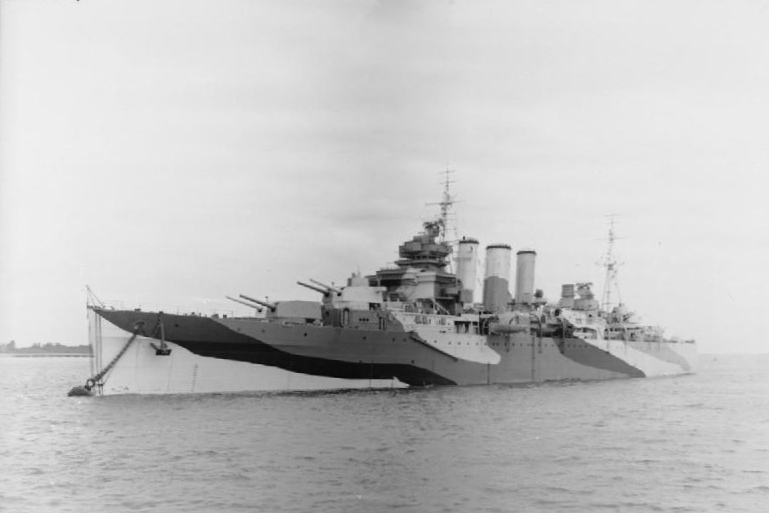
- HMS Shropshire

History

United Kingdom
- Name: HMS Shropshire
- Namesake: Shropshire, England
- Ordered: 17 March 1926
- Builder: William Beardmore and Company (Dalmuir, Scotland)
- Laid down: 24 February 1927
- Launched: 5 July 1928
- Completed: 12 September 1929
- Commissioned: 24 September 1929
- Decommissioned: 23 December 1942
- Identification: Pennant number: 73, later 83, later 96
- Honours and awards: Battle honours: Atlantic 1941; Arctic 1941
- Fate: Transferred to RAN

Australia
- Name: HMAS Shropshire
- Commissioned: 20 April 1943
- Decommissioned: 10 November 1949
- Motto: "Floreat Ambo"
- Honours and awards: Battle honours: New Guinea 1943–44; Leyte Gulf 1944; Lingayen Gulf 1945; Borneo 1945; Pacific 1945
- Fate: Sold for scrap, 16 July 1954

General characteristics
- Class & type: County-class heavy cruiser
- Displacement: 9,750 tons standard; 13,315 tons full load
- Length: 633 ft (193 m)
- Beam: 66 ft (20 m)
- Draught: 21 ft (6.4 m)
- Propulsion: 8 × Admiralty 3-drum boilers; 4-shaft Parsons geared turbines; 80,000 shaft horsepower (60,000 kW)
- Speed: 32 knots (59 km/h; 37 mph)
- Range: 4,715 km (2,546 nmi; 2,930 mi) at 31.5 knots (58.3 km/h; 36.2 mph); 20,116 kilometres (10,862 nmi; 12,500 mi) at 12 knots (22 km/h; 14 mph); 3,210 tons fuel oil
- Complement: 690 (peace), 1,000 (war)
- Armament: Original configuration: 8 × 8-in (203 mm) Mk VIII dual guns; 4 × QF 4-in (102 mm) Mk V single AA guns; 4 × 2-pdr (40 mm) single pom-poms; 2 × 2-pdr (40 mm) quad pom-poms; 2 × 0.5-in quadruple Vickers machine gun mount; 2 × quadruple 21 inch (533 mm) torpedo tubes; April 1941 – November 1942 configuration: 8 × 8-in (203 mm) Mk VIII dual guns; 4 × QF 4-inch (101.6 mm) Mk XVI dual AA guns; 2 × 2-pdr (40 mm) eight barrel pom-poms; 10 × 20 mm (0.8 in) single guns; 2 × .50 caliber quadruple Vickers machine gun mount; 2 × quadruple 21-in (533 mm) torpedo tubes; November 1942 – April 1944 configuration: 8 × 8 in (203-mm) Mk VIII dual guns; 4 × QF 4-inch (101.6 mm) Mk XVI dual AA guns; 2 × 2-pdr (40 mm) eight barrel pom-poms; 6 × 20-mm (0.8 in) single guns; 7 × 20-mm (0.8 in) dual guns; 2 × 0.5-in quadruple Vickers machine gun mount; 2 × quadruple 21-in (533 mm) torpedo tubes; January 1945 – February 1946 configuration: 8 × 8-in (203 mm) Mk VIII dual guns; 4 × QF 4-inch (101.6 mm) Mk XVI dual AA guns; 2 × 2-pdr (40 mm) eight barrel pom-poms; 2 × 20-mm (0.8 in) dual guns; 15 × 40-mm (1.5 in) Bofors Mk III single guns
- Armour: 1 to 4 inches (2.5 to 10.2 cm) magazine box protection; 1.375 inches (3.49 cm) deck; 1 inch (2.5 cm) side-plating, turrets and bulkheads; 4.5 inches (11 cm) belt; 4 inches (10 cm) internal boiler room sides (added 1936–1940)
- Aircraft carried: One aircraft, one catapult. Three planes used during service; Fairey III, Hawker Osprey, Supermarine Walrus

HMS Shropshire was a Royal Navy (RN) heavy cruiser of the London sub-class of County-class cruisers. She is the only warship to have been named after Shropshire, England. Completed in 1929, Shropshire served with the RN until 1942, when she was transferred to the Royal Australian Navy (RAN) following the loss of sister ship HMAS Canberra. Commissioned as HMAS Shropshire, the ship remained in RAN service until 1949, and was sold for scrap in 1954.

== Design ==
Shropshire was one of four heavy cruisers built to the London design of the County-class cruisers. The cruiser had a displacement of 9,830 tons at standard load, was 632.75 feet (192.86 m) long overall, 595 feet (181 m) long between perpendiculars, and had a beam of 66 feet (20 m).

The propulsion system consisted of eight Yarrow-type boilers, which fed Parsons geared turbines. These generated 80,000 shaft horsepower, which was fed to the ship's four 11-foot (3.4 m) diameter propellers. The cruiser could reach speeds of up to 32.25 knots (59.73 km/h; 37.11 mph), with 12 knots (22 km/h; 14 mph) as the designated economical speed. At economical speed, she could travel 8,700 nautical miles (16,100 km; 10,000 mi).

=== Armament ===
The cruiser's initial armament consisted of eight BL 8 inch Mk VIII naval guns in four twin turrets, four single QF 4 inch Mk V naval guns and four single QF 2 pounder naval guns (or pom-poms) for anti-aircraft defence, four 3-pounder guns, and a number of smaller calibre guns for point defence. During the 1930s, two 0.5-inch machine guns were added to the point defence armament.

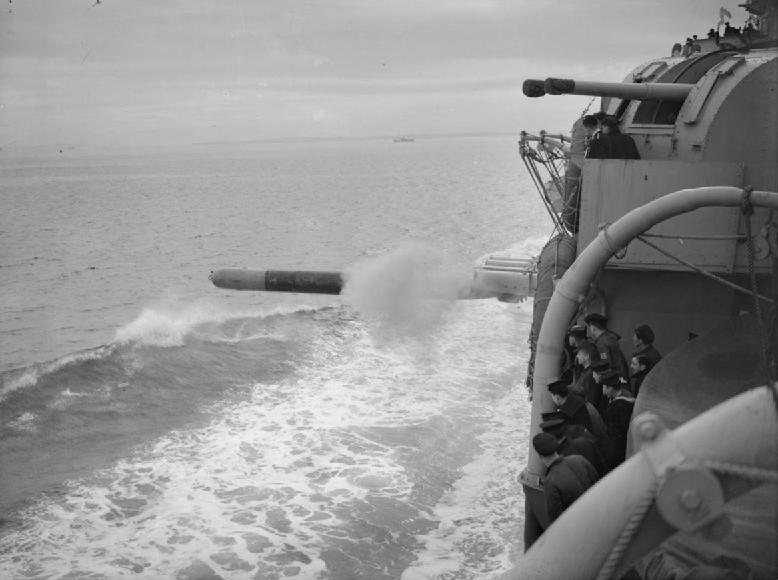
Members of the ship's company watching a torpedo leaving the torpedo tubes mounted amidships during firing trials. One of the cruiser's twin 4-inch gun turrets can be seen.

Shortly before transfer to the RAN in 1943, Shropshire underwent a refit. Although the main armament was unchanged, the 4-inch guns were upgraded to twin mountings, while the anti-aircraft armament was replaced with eighteen 20 mm Oerlikon guns (seven twin mountings and four single mountings) and two QF 2-pounder Mark VI eight-barrelled pom-poms. The 3-pounder guns were deleted, while two quadruple-tube launchers for 21-inch torpedoes and several depth charge chutes were installed. During the same refit, the cruiser ceased operating its seaplane, and the aircraft catapult was removed.

In 1945, during a refit in Sydney, Shropshire's armament changed again. The torpedo tubes and depth charge throwers were stripped from the ship, and the entire Oerlikon outfit was replaced by fifteen single 40 mm Bofors guns. By February 1946, six of the Bofors guns had been removed, with the cruiser's armament settling into its final configuration.

== Construction ==
Construction of the cruiser was ordered on 17 March 1926. Shropshire was laid down at the shipyard of William Beardmore and Company, at Dalmuir, Scotland on 24 February 1927. She was launched by Violet Herbert, Countess of Powis, on 5 July 1928. Completed on 12 September 1929, the cruiser was commissioned into the RN on 24 September 1929.

The ship's name was chosen by First Lord of the Admiralty William Bridgeman, whose constituency was located in the county of Shropshire. Shropshire is the only ship of the RN or RAN to carry the name. The ship's badge takes the leopard's face from the arms of the Shropshire County Council.

== Operational history ==
=== RN service ===
After post-commissioning workups, Shropshire was assigned to the 1st Cruiser Squadron of the British Mediterranean Fleet in November 1929. During 1935 and 1936, the cruiser was involved in the British response to the Abyssinia Crisis. Shropshire was also present for the Spanish Civil War, and between 22 August and 16 September 1936, supported the evacuation of refugees from Barcelona. She remained in the Mediterranean (apart from returning to the United Kingdom for refits) until the outbreak of World War II in September 1939, at which point the cruiser was reassigned to the South Atlantic for trade protection patrols.

On 9 December 1939, Shropshire intercepted the German merchant Adolf Leonhardt, which was scuttled by her own crew. The cruiser returned to Britain for a refit in early 1940, before proceeding to the Indian Ocean, where she was employed on convoy cover duties between Cape Town-Durban-Mombassa and Aden. She also participated in the campaign against Italian Somaliland during 1941, bombarding both Mogadishu and Kismayu during the advance of the South African Army from Kenya to Abyssinia, and sinking the Italian vessel Pensilvania off Mogadishu on 13 February. She remained in the South Atlantic, undergoing a refit at Simon's Town between March and June 1941, then came home in October 1941 for a further major refit at Chatham between October 1941 and March 1942 before returning to the South Atlantic until the end of the year, when she was recalled to Chatham prior to transfer to the RAN.

The cruiser earned the RN battle honours "Atlantic 1941" and "Arctic 1941" for her wartime service.

=== Transfer to RAN ===
Following the loss of the Australian heavy cruiser HMAS Canberra, a County-class cruiser of the Kent sub-class, at the Battle of Savo Island, it was announced that Shropshire would be transferred to the RAN as a gift. King George VI announced on 10 September 1943 that the ship would be renamed Canberra. However, around the same time, United States President Franklin Delano Roosevelt chose to commemorate the Australian warship's loss by renaming the under-construction Baltimore-class cruiser Pittsburgh as USS Canberra.

The duplication of ship names with the United States Navy was against RAN policy, and it was initially felt that Australia had a greater claim to the name. Protests in favour of retaining Shropshire's original name were received from the British elements of the ship's company, who felt that renaming a ship after one that had recently been sunk was inviting bad luck, and from citizens of the ship's namesake, which had adopted the cruiser in a Warship Week earlier that year, and thought that Shropshire's history and links to the community were being discarded without thought. One letter proposed, that the ship be named "HMAS Canberra (the gift of HMS) Shropshire" in order to retain the old name. The Australian government decided to retain Shropshire's old name after learning that the US offer had come directly from President Roosevelt.

Shropshire underwent refit at Chatham from December 1942 until 20 June 1943. Sources differ on the date of commissioning: although the commissioning ceremony was performed on 20 April, Captain John Augustine Collins successfully argued to have the ship recognised administratively as a commissioned Australian warship from 17 April, in order to keep Australian personnel (arriving that day) away from the RN rum issue. The refit was not completed until 25 June.

=== RAN service ===
Shropshire left the United Kingdom in August, as part of the escort for a convoy to Gibraltar. After this, she continued on to Australia, and arrived in Sydney on 2 October. At the end of the month, she joined Task Force 74 at Brisbane, and supported the amphibious landings at Arawe and Cape Gloucester during December. In March 1944, Shropshire was involved in the Admiralty Islands campaign. During April, the cruiser participated in the landing at Hollandia. In May, while operating in the Wakde-Sarmi-Biak area, a bomb was accidentally dropped by a United States aircraft between Shropshire and HMAS Warramunga. Although the bomb missed both ships and appeared to cause no damage, the cruiser's engines began to malfunction four days later, and Shropshire returned to Australia for repairs.

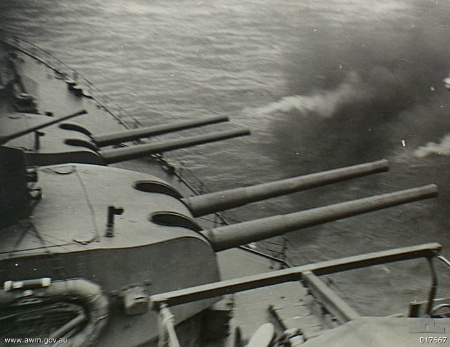
Shropshire's forward turrets firing during the Battle of Morotai

The ship returned to service on 12 July, and provided naval gunfire support for operations in Aitape and Cape Sansapore during July and August, Morotai in September, and Leyte Gulf in early October. Shropshire was reassigned to Task Force 77, and participated in the Battle of Surigao Strait on 25 October. The cruiser was involved in the Battle of Luzon during January 1945, during which she was attacked by two kamikaze aircraft: one narrowly missed, while the second was shot down by HMAS Gascoyne close enough for debris to hit Shropshire. Shropshire fired in anger for the last time during the Corregidor landings, then briefly returned to Australia.

Shropshire returned to the Philippines in time for the Japanese surrender of the islands, then proceeded to Japan, and was present at Tokyo Bay on 2 September 1945 for the signing of the Japanese Instrument of Surrender. The cruiser's wartime service with the RAN was recognised with five battle honours: "New Guinea 1943–44", "Leyte Gulf 1944", Lingayen Gulf 1945", "Borneo 1945", and "Pacific 1945". Only five personnel died during the ship's RAN service, but although all five occurred during World War II, none were the result of enemy action; one drowned, and the other four were the result of accidents.

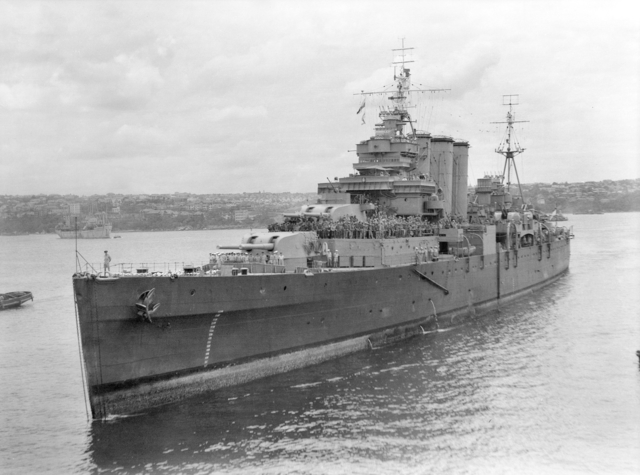
Shropshire arriving in Sydney Harbour on 30 November 1945. The cruiser has just returned from Japan, and is transporting Australian soldiers home.

The cruiser remained in Japanese waters until 17 November, when she sailed for Sydney. In May 1946, Shropshire transported the Australian contingent to England for the British Empire victory celebrations. The ship returned home in August. From January until March 1947, Shropshire was again in Japanese waters.

== Decommissioning and fate ==
After returning to Sydney in March 1947, Shropshire was prepared for decommissioning, although she was not paid off into reserve until 10 November 1949. The ship was sold to Thos. W. Ward of Sheffield, England, acting on behalf of the British Iron & Steel Corporation, on 16 July 1954, for £82,500 sterling. On 9 October 1954, the Dutch tug Oostzee began the voyage from Sydney to Dalmuir, Scotland. Breaking commenced in Dalmuir on 20 January 1955, with the ship's hull then transported to Troon, where scrapping resumed on 19 September.

A silver bugle presented to the ship by the King's Shropshire Light Infantry was kept by the RAN after Shropshire's decommissioning, and was later placed on display at the Russell Offices (which houses the Department of Defence) until at least the mid-1980s.
