= BL 8-inch Mk VIII naval gun =

1927–1954 battery gun of the Royal Navy

Ordnance BL 8 inch gun Mk VIII
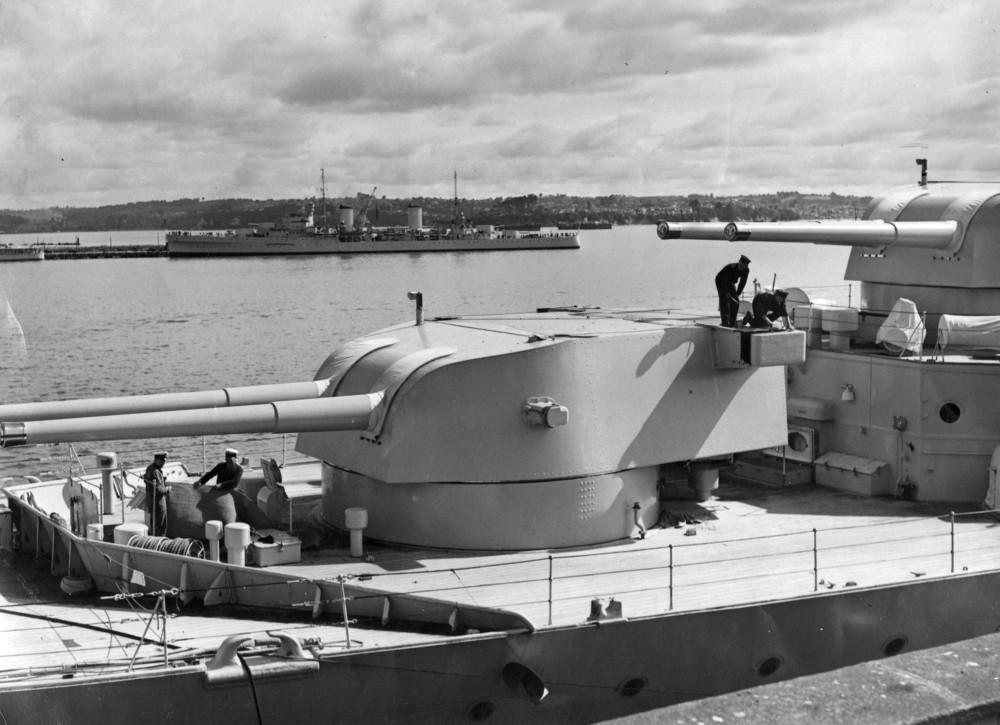
- Forward 8-inch turrets aboard HMAS Canberra
- Type: Naval gun Coast defence gun
- Place of origin: United Kingdom

Service history
- In service: 1927 – 1954
- Used by: Royal Navy; Royal Australian Navy; Spanish Navy
- Wars: Second World War; Spanish Civil War

Production history
- No. built: 168

Specifications
- Mass: 17.5 tonnes
- Barrel length: 400 inches/10 meters(50 calibres)
- Shell: 256 pounds (116 kg)
- Calibre: 8-inch (203 mm)
- Muzzle velocity: 2805 feet per second (855 m/s)
- Maximum firing range: 28 kilometres (17 mi)

The BL 8 inch gun Mark VIII (Note: Mark VIII = Mark 8. Britain used Roman numerals to denote Marks (models) of ordnance until after World War II. Hence this was the eighth model of BL 8-inch naval gun.) was the main battery gun used on the Royal Navy's County-class cruisers, (Note: A more accurate term is "Treaty Cruiser", as the term heavy cruiser was only formally defined at the time of the London Naval Treaty of 1930. However, all the 8-inch gun cruisers introduced as a result of the 1922 Washington Treaty were what became known as "heavy cruisers".) in compliance with the Washington Naval Treaty of 1922. This treaty allowed ships of not more than 10,000 tons standard displacement and with guns no larger than 8 inches (203 mm) to be excluded from total tonnage limitations on a nation's capital ships. The 10,000 ton limit was a major factor in design decisions such as turrets and gun mountings. A similar gun formed the main battery of Spanish Canarias-class cruisers. In 1930, the Royal Navy adopted the BL 6 inch Mk XXIII naval gun as the standard cruiser main battery in preference to this 8-inch gun.

== Description ==
These guns, 50 calibres long, were built-up guns which consisted of a wire-wound tube encased within a second tube and jacket with a Welin breech block and hydraulic or hand-operated Asbury mechanism. Two cloth bags each containing 15 kg (33 lb) of cordite were used to fire a 116 kg (256 lb) projectile. Mark I turrets allowed gun elevation to 70 degrees to fire high-explosive shells against aircraft. Hydraulic pumps proved incapable of providing sufficient train and elevation speed to follow contemporary aircraft; so simplified version of the Mark II turrets with a maximum elevation of 50 degrees were installed in Exeter. Each gun could fire approximately five rounds per minute. Useful life expectancy was 550 effective full charges (EFC) per barrel.

== Naval service ==
The following ships mounted Mk VIII guns in 188-tonne twin turrets. The standard main battery was four turrets, but Exeter and York carried only three to reduce weight and formed the separate York class.

- County-class heavy cruisers : 13 ships
  - Canarias-class heavy cruisers : 2 ships
- York-class heavy cruisers : 2 ships

== Coast defence guns ==
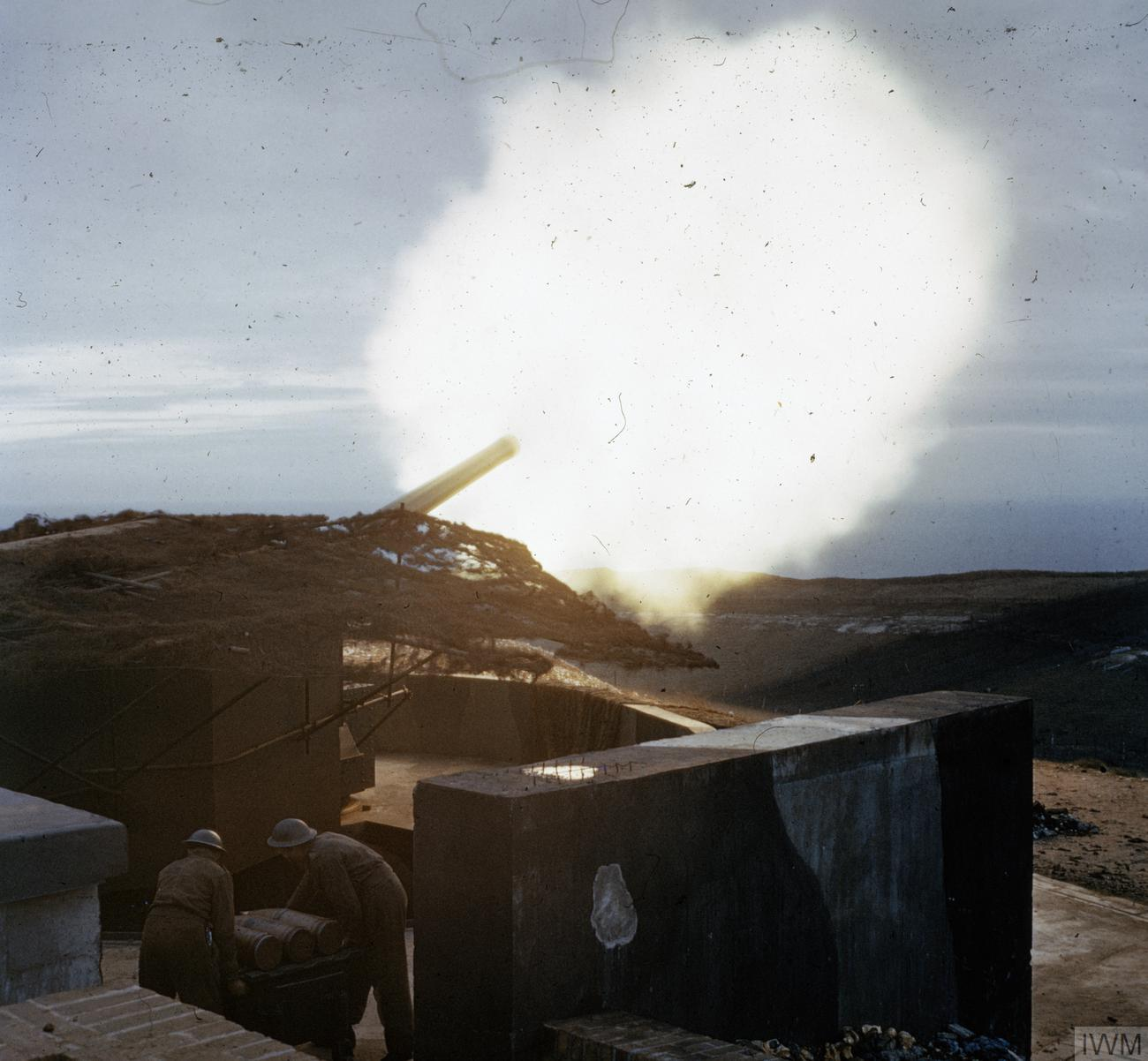
Gun of 428 Battery Coast Defence Artillery firing at dusk during World War II

Six single guns capable of elevating to 70 degrees were installed as coastal artillery in the Folkestone-Dover area during the Second World War.

== Ammunition ==
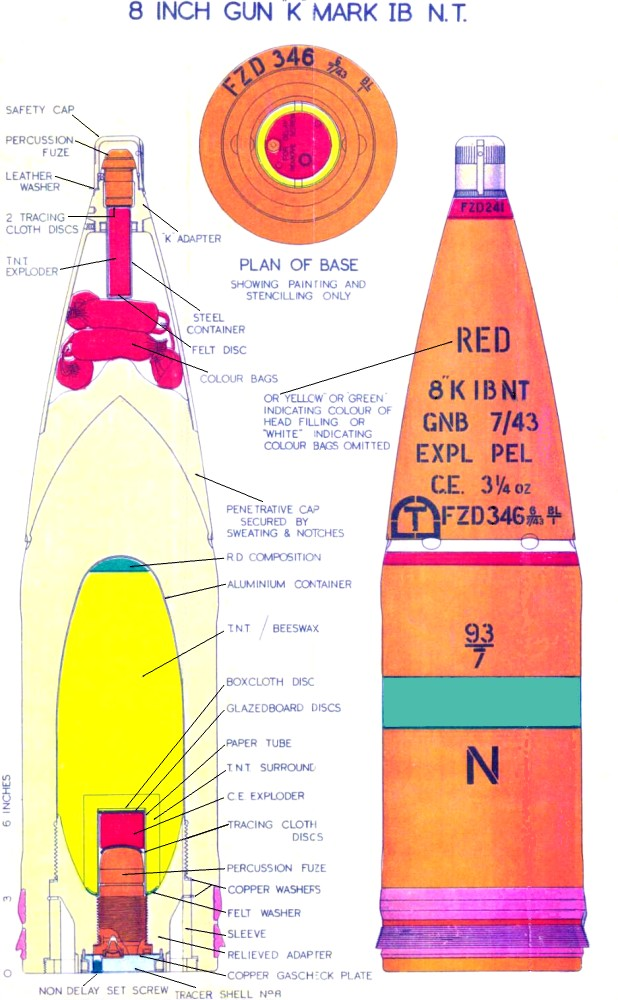
World War II semi-armour-piercing shell with marker dye to identify ship that fired it for range corrections

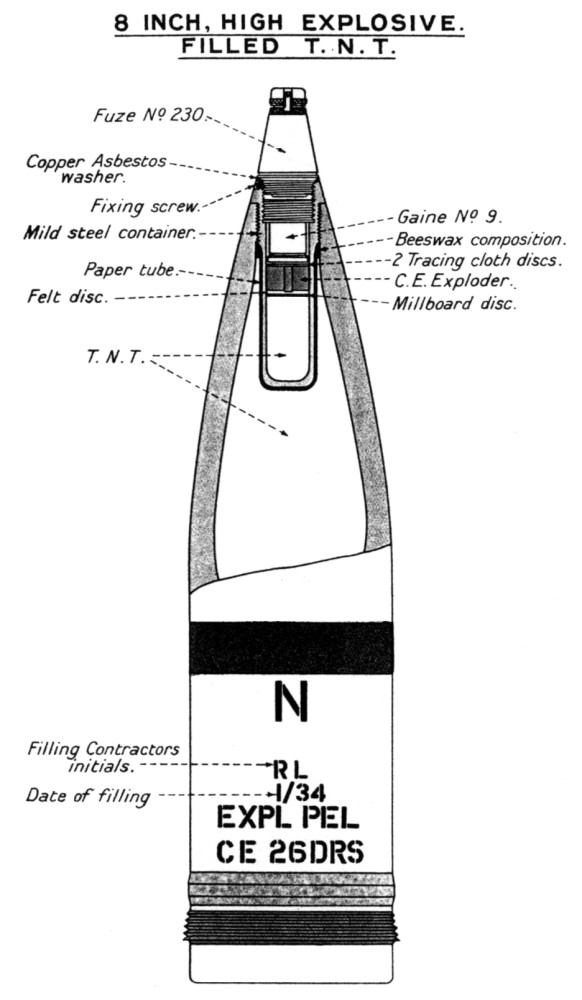
1930s high-explosive shell

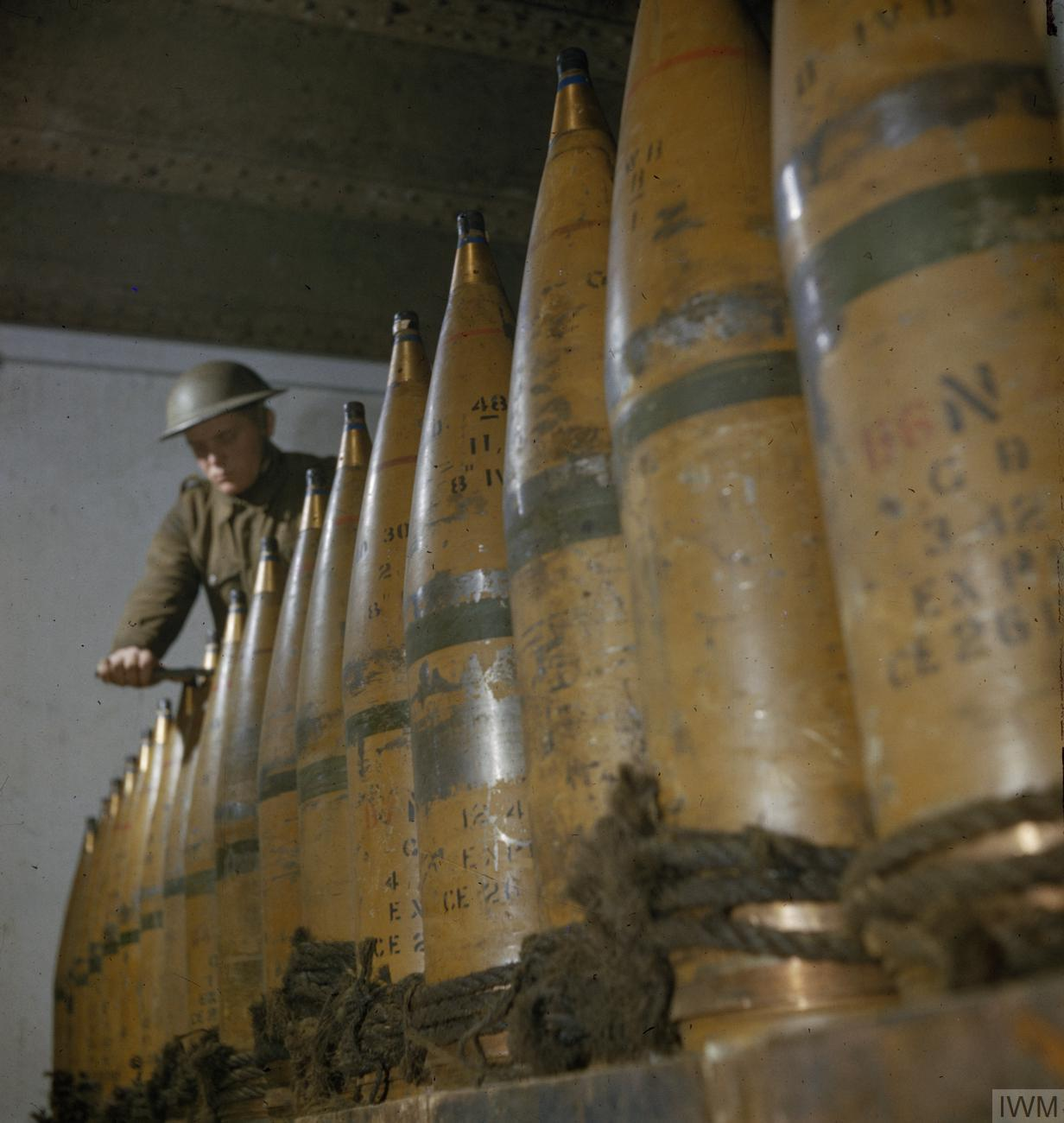
Coast-defence gun shells, World War II

== Shell trajectory ==
Range with 256 lbs. (116.1) SAPC with MV = 2,725 fps (831 mps)

Range	Elevation	Time of flight	Descent	Impact velocity
5,000 yd (4,570 m)	2° 11′	6 s	2° 31′	2154 ft/s (657 m/s)
10,000 yd (9,140 m)	5° 14′	14 s	7° 15′	1683 ft/s (513 m/s)
15,000 yd (13,720 m)	9° 47′	25 s	15° 49′	1322 ft/s (403 m/s)
20,000 yd (18,290 m)	16° 34′	38 s	28° 31′	1169 ft/s (356 m/s)
25,000 yd (22,860 m)	26° 44′	56 s	43° 7′	1164 ft/s (355 m/s)
29,000 yd (26,520 m)	41° 28′	79 s	56° 37′	1240 ft/s (378 m/s)

== See also ==
=== Weapons of comparable role, performance and era ===
- 203mm/50 Modèle 1924 gun French equivalent
- 20.3 cm SK C/34 Naval gun German equivalent
- 203 mm /53 Italian naval gun Italian equivalent
- 20 cm/50 3rd Year Type naval gun Japanese equivalent
- 8"/55 caliber gun US equivalent

== Surviving examples ==
- A gun from HMAS Australia outside the Australian War Memorial, Canberra

== Bibliography ==
- Campbell, John (1985). Naval Weapons of World War Two. Naval Institute Press. ISBN 0-87021-459-4.
- Lenton, H.T. & Colledge, J.J. (1968). British and Dominion Warships of World War Two. Doubleday and Company.
- Whitley, M.J. (1995). Cruisers of World War Two. Brockhampton Press. ISBN 1-86019-8740.
