= Galfry Gatacre =

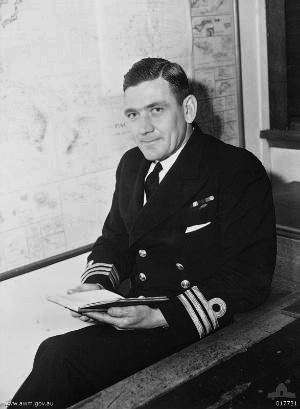
- Commander Galfry Gatacre c. early 1940s
- Born: Galfry George Ormond Gataker; 11 June 1907; Wooroolin, Queensland
- Died: 11 August 1983 (aged 76); Eastwood, New South Wales
- Military career
- Allegiance: Australia
- Branch: Royal Australian Navy
- Service years: 1921–1964
- Rank: Rear Admiral
- Nickname: "Gat"
- Commands: East Australia Area (1962–64); HM Australian Fleet (1959); HMAS Melbourne (1955–57); HMAS Anzac (1952–53); Deputy Chief of Naval Staff (1948–51, 1957–59); HMAS Arunta (1945–47)
- Conflicts: Second World War; Battle of the Atlantic; Sinking of the Bismark; Battle of Savo Island; Battle of the Eastern Solomons; Korean War
- Awards: Commander of the Order of the British Empire; Distinguished Service Order; Distinguished Service Cross & Bar; Mentioned in Despatches

Rear Admiral Galfry George Ormond Gatacre, CBE, DSO, DSC & Bar (né Gataker; 11 June 1907 – 12 August 1983) was a senior officer in the Royal Australian Navy (RAN), who also played first-class cricket. His naval career began in 1921 and lasted until his retirement in 1964, during which time he spent a number of years on secondment to the Royal Navy. He saw action in both the Second World War and the Korean War, for which he was awarded the Distinguished Service Cross and the Distinguished Service Order. He also played first-class cricket in England for the Royal Navy Cricket Club. He was made a Commander of the Order of the British Empire in 1960 and, after retirement from the navy, he became a businessman.

== Early life and naval career ==
The son of Reginald Henry Winchcombe Gataker, an English-born farmer, and his Scottish-born wife, Christian Esson (née Gordon), Galfry George Ormond Gataker was born at Wooroolin, Queensland, on 11 June 1907. He was home schooled, before attending the Church of England Grammar School in Brisbane, and subsequently the Brisbane Boys' College. He was inspired to the join the Royal Australian Navy (RAN) after completing his education by his godfather, Admiral Sir Reginald Tupper. He entered into the Royal Australian Naval College as a cadet midshipman in 1921, from which he graduated in 1924 as one of only two chief cadet captains in his final year.

Gataker was appointed as a midshipman in May 1925, before promotion to the rank of sub-lieutenant in April 1928. During this period he served on a variety of RAN and Royal Navy ships in the Far East and the Mediterranean, before undergoing further training in Britain. While in Britain he made a single appearance in first-class cricket for the Royal Navy against the Royal Air Force at The Oval in 1928. Batting twice in the match, he was dismissed by Reginald Fulljames in both innings, for scores of 12 and 7, while with the ball he took a single wicket in the Royal Air Force first-innings, when he dismissed their captain Charles Blount. A noted spin bowler, Gataker came to the attention of state cricket coaches in Australia, but never pursued the opportunity to play at a higher level.

Following his training in Britain, Gataker was posted to HMAS Canberra in November 1928 as a watch-keeping officer. He was promoted to the rank of lieutenant in January 1930, while in May 1931 he was made the flag lieutenant to Leonard Holbrook, the commodore commanding the Australian Squadron. He changed the spelling of his surname to Gatacre by deed poll in 1930.

== Royal Navy service and Second World War ==
Gatacre married Winifred May Palmer at the Presbyterian Church in Mosman in January 1933. Soon after, the couple left for Britain, where Gatacre was to undertake specialist navigational training with the Royal Navy. He completed his advanced navigational course in 1937, having undertaken his training aboard HMS Harebell and HMAS Stuart, including navigational training off the Spanish coast during the Spanish Civil War. He joined the crew of HMS Devonshire in later 1937, and was promoted to the rank of lieutenant commander in January 1938. He was serving aboard HMS Edinburgh at the start of the Second World War, and later served aboard HMS Renown, HMS Nelson and HMS Rodney. He was the navigator aboard HMS Rodney and was involved in the hunt for and sinking of the German battleship Bismarck. For his "accurate navigation and judicious selection of courses" during the hunt, he was awarded the Distinguished Service Cross in the 1941 Birthday Honours.

Gatacre was promoted to the rank of commander in December 1941, before returning to Australia in April 1942. He was appointed upon his return as a staff officer and intelligence and operations aboard HMAS Australia, seeing multiple actions in the South West Pacific theatre over the next two years, including the battles of Savo Island and the Eastern Solomons, as well as the amphibious landings along the Papua New Guinea coastline. For his actions in the Eastern Solomons, he was awarded a Bar to his Distinguished Service Cross. In August 1944, he was posted to a shore position in Melbourne, tasked with post-war planning. He held this position for a year, before being placed aboard HMAS Arunta as the ship's commanding officer in August 1945. Following the war, the ship assisted with the Commonwealth Occupation of Japan.

== Korean War and later service ==
Gatacre was promoted to the rank of captain in June 1948, at which point he was appointed Deputy Chief of Staff at the Naval Office. He attended a course at the Imperial Defence College in London in 1951, after which he was appointed the first captain of the newly commissioned HMAS Anzac and commanding officer of the 10th Destroyer Squadron in February 1952. He saw action during the Korean War, patrolling off the east and west coasts of Korea, with HMAS Anzac spending more time in the combat zone than any other Commonwealth warship. He was awarded the Distinguished Service Order in May 1953 for his service in Korean waters.

Gatacre was sent to the United States in July 1953, where he served for two years as the Australian naval attaché in Washington, before being appointed commanding officer of the newly commissioned HMAS Melbourne in October 1955. He again held the position of Deputy Chief of Naval Staff in January 1957, owing to a lack of experienced senior officers in the RAN at the time, before being promoted to the rank of rear admiral in June 1958, and being made the Flag Officer Commanding HM's Australian Fleet in January 1959, the most senior seagoing post in the RAN. He was appointed a Commander of the Order of the British Empire in the 1960 New Year Honours. In January 1960, he was sent to Washington as head of the Australian Joint Services Staff, a position he held for two years. Returning in 1962, he became the second member of the Australian Commonwealth Naval Board and was appointed Flag Officer-in-Charge, East Australia Area in July 1962. In February 1964, units under his command were involved in the rescue of survivors of the Melbourne–Voyager collision.

Gatacre retired from active service in July 1964, beginning a career in business with the RSL Permanent Building Society and Elliott-Automation. He died at Eastwood, New South Wales, on 12 August 1983 and was survived by his son.

Military offices
Preceded by Rear Admiral George Oldham	Flag Officer-in-Charge East Australia Area; 1962–1964	Succeeded by Rear Admiral Alan McNicoll
Preceded by Rear Admiral Henry Burrell	Flag Officer Commanding HM Australian Fleet; 1959	Succeeded by Rear Admiral Hastings Harrington
Preceded by Rear Admiral Jack Mesley	Deputy Chief of Naval Staff; 1957–1959	Succeeded by Rear Admiral Otto Becher
Preceded by Captain Henry Burrell	Deputy Chief of Naval Staff; 1948–1951	Succeeded by Captain Alan McNicoll
