= Dechaineux =

Dechaineux can refer to:

- Emile Dechaineux a captain in the Australian Navy.
- HMAS Dechaineux (SSG 76) a submarine named after him.
