= HMAS Australia (D84) =

County-class Royal Australian Navy cruiser

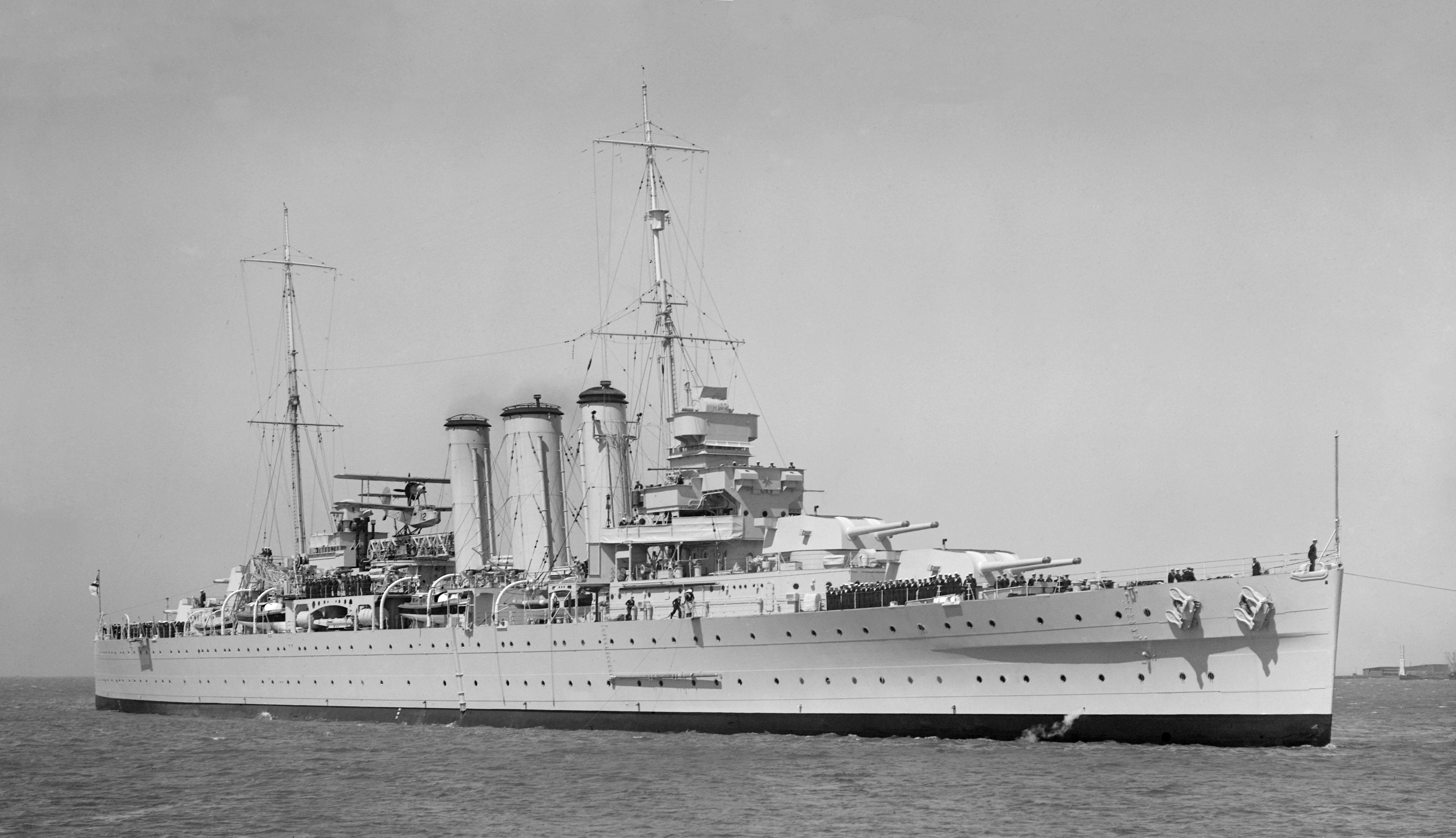
- HMAS Australia in October 1937

History

Australia
- Namesake: Commonwealth of Australia
- Ordered: 1924
- Builder: John Brown & Company, Clydebank, Scotland
- Cost: 1.9 million pounds
- Laid down: 26 August 1925
- Launched: 17 March 1927
- Commissioned: 24 April 1928
- Decommissioned: 31 August 1954
- Honours and awards: Battle honours: Atlantic 1940–1941; Pacific 1941–1943; Coral Sea 1942; Savo Island 1942; Guadalcanal 1942; New Guinea 1942–1944; Leyte Gulf 1944; Lingayen Gulf 1945; Plus two inherited honours
- Fate: Sold for scrapping, 1955
- Badge: Note: (Note: The layout of the ship's badge depicted here was designed after World War II for any future ships named HMAS Australia. The badge used by this ship consisted only of the rope circle and its contents.)

General characteristics
- Class & type: County-class heavy cruiser; Kent subclass
- Displacement: 10,000 tons standard
- Length: 590 ft (180 m) between perpendiculars; 630 ft 4 in (192.13 m) overall
- Beam: 68 ft 3 in (20.80 m)
- Draught: 21 ft 4 in (6.50 m)
- Propulsion: 8 × Yarrow superheated boilers; Curtis high-pressure and Parsons low-pressure geared turbines; 80,000 shaft horsepower; 4 × 3-bladed propellers
- Speed: 31 knots (57 km/h; 36 mph)
- Range: 2,270 nautical miles (4,200 km; 2,610 mi) at 31 knots (57 km/h; 36 mph); 10,000 nautical miles (19,000 km; 12,000 mi) at 11 knots (20 km/h; 13 mph)
- Complement: Up to 815
- Armament: At launch: 8 × 8-inch (203 mm) guns (4 twin turrets); 4 × 4-inch (102 mm) anti-aircraft guns; 4 × 2-pounder (40 mm) pom-poms; 16 × .303-inch machine guns; 2 × quadruple 21-inch (533 mm) torpedo tube sets; 4 × 3-pounder (47 mm) saluting guns; In 1945: 6 × 8-inch guns (3 twin turrets); 8 × 4-inch guns (4 twin mounts); 8 × 40 mm Bofors guns; 16 × .303-inch machine guns; 4 × 3-pounder saluting guns
- Armour: Magazines and machinery spaces: 1.5 to 3 inches (38 to 76 mm); Turrets: 2 inches (51 mm); Conning tower: 3 inches (76 mm); Anti-torpedo bulges; Belt armour: up to 4.5 inches (110 mm) (installed 1938–39)
- Aircraft carried: 1 × Supermarine Seagull III (1928–1936); 1 × Supermarine Walrus (1936–1944)
- Aviation facilities: 1 × catapult (1935–1944)

HMAS Australia (I84/D84/C01) was a County-class heavy cruiser of the Royal Australian Navy (RAN). One of two Kent-subclass ships ordered for the RAN in 1924, Australia was laid down in Scotland in 1925, and entered service in 1928. Apart from an exchange deployment to the Mediterranean from 1934 to 1936, during which she became involved in the planned British response to the Abyssinia Crisis, Australia operated in local and South-West Pacific waters until World War II began.

The cruiser remained near Australia until mid-1940, when she was deployed for duties in the eastern Atlantic, including hunts for German ships and participation in Operation Menace. During 1941, Australia operated in home and Indian Ocean waters, but was reassigned as flagship of the ANZAC Squadron in early 1942. As part of this force (which was later redesignated Task Force 44, then Task Force 74), Australia operated in support of United States naval and amphibious operations throughout South-East Asia until the start of 1945, including involvement in the battles at the Coral Sea and Savo Island, the amphibious landings at Guadalcanal and Leyte Gulf, and numerous actions during the New Guinea campaign. She was forced to withdraw following a series of kamikaze attacks during the invasion of Lingayen Gulf. The prioritisation of shipyard work in Australia for British Pacific Fleet vessels saw the Australian cruiser sail to England for repairs, where she was at the end of the war.

During the late 1940s, Australia served with the British Commonwealth Occupation Force in Japan, and participated in several port visits to other nations, before being retasked as a training ship in 1950. The cruiser was decommissioned in 1954, and sold for scrapping in 1955.

== Design ==
Australia was one of seven warships built to the Kent design of County-class heavy cruiser, which were based on design work by Eustace Tennyson-d'Eyncourt. She was designed with a standard displacement of 10,000 tons, a length between perpendiculars of 590 feet (180 m), a length overall of 630 feet 4 inches (192.13 m), a beam of 68 feet 3 inches (20.80 m), and a maximum draught of 21 feet 4 inches (6.50 m).

The propulsion machinery consisted of eight Yarrow superheated boilers feeding Curtis high-pressure and Parsons low-pressure geared turbines. This delivered up to 80,000 shaft horsepower to the cruiser's four three-bladed propellers. The cruiser's top speed was 31 knots (57 km/h; 36 mph), with a range of 2,270 nautical miles (4,200 km; 2,610 mi), while her economical range and cruising speed was 10,000 nautical miles (19,000 km; 12,000 mi) at 11 knots (20 km/h; 13 mph).

The ship's company consisted of 64 officers and 678 sailors in 1930; this dropped to 45 officers and 654 sailors from 1937 to 1941. While operating as flagship, Australia's company was 710. During wartime, the ship's company increased to 815.

=== Armament and armour ===
Australia was designed with eight 8-inch (200 mm) guns in four twin turrets ('A' and 'B' forward, 'X' and 'Y' aft) as primary armament, with 150 shells per gun. Secondary armament consisted of four 4-inch (100 mm) guns in four single mounts, with 200 shells per gun, and four 2-pounder pom-poms for anti-aircraft defence, with 1,000 rounds each. A mixture of .303-inch machine guns (7.7 mm) were carried for close defence work: initially this consisted of four Vickers machine guns and twelve Lewis machine guns, although four Lewis guns were later removed. Two sets of quadruple 21-inch (530 mm) torpedo tubes were fitted. Four 3-pounder quick-firing Hotchkiss guns were used as saluting guns. During her 1939 modernisation, the four single 4-inch (100 mm) guns were replaced by four twin Mark XVI guns. The torpedo tubes were removed in 1942, and the 'X' turret was taken off in 1945.

The close-range anti-aircraft armament of the ship fluctuated during her career. During the mid-1930s, two quadruple 0.5-inch (13 mm) machine gun mounts were installed to supplement the 0.303-inch (7.7 mm) weapons. These were replaced in late 1943 by seven single 20mm Oerlikons. By early 1944, all seven Oerlikons had been upgraded to double mountings. These were in turn replaced by eight single 40 mm Bofors guns in 1945.

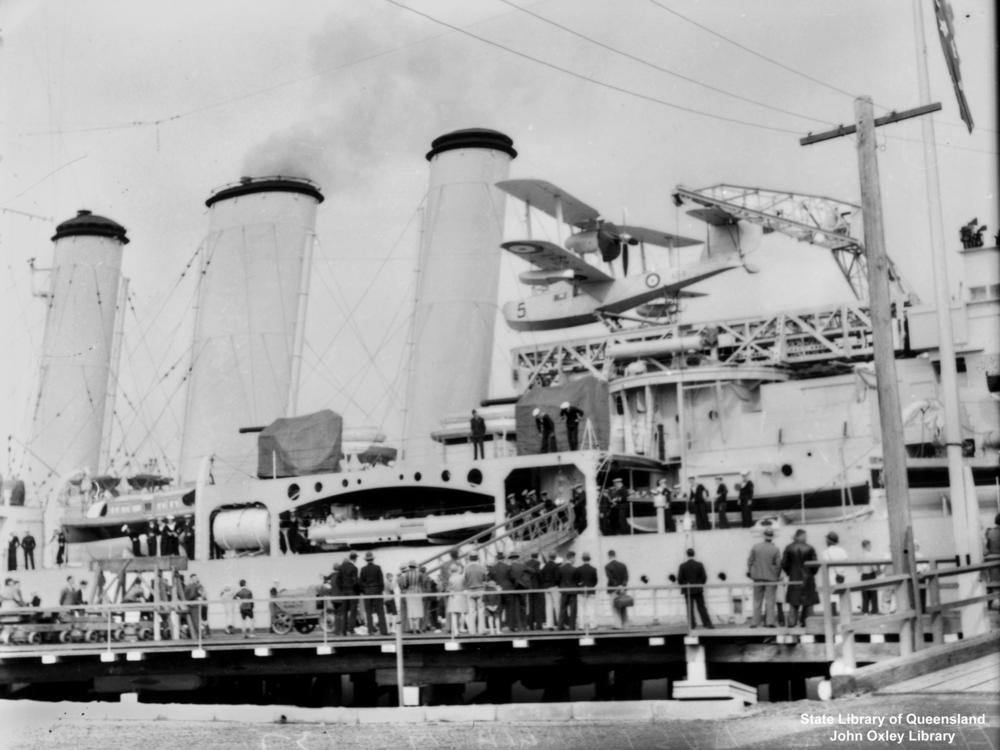
A Supermarine Walrus stowed on Australia's catapult while the ship was alongside in Brisbane during 1937

Australia was designed to carry a single amphibious aircraft: a Supermarine Seagull III aircraft, which was replaced in 1936 by a Supermarine Walrus. Both aircraft were operated by the Royal Australian Air Force's Fleet Co-operation Unit; initially by No. 101 Flight RAAF, which was expanded in 1936 to form No. 5 Squadron RAAF, then renumbered in 1939 to No. 9 Squadron RAAF. As the aircraft catapult was not installed until September 1935, the Seagull was initially lowered into the water by the ship's recovery crane to launch under its own power. The catapult and Walrus were removed in October 1944.

Armour aboard Australia was initially limited to an armour deck over the machinery spaces and magazines, ranging from 1.5 to 3 inches (38 to 76 mm) in thickness. Armour plate was also fitted to the turrets (up to 2 inches (51 mm) thick) and the conning tower (3 inches (76 mm) thick). Anti-torpedo bulges were also fitted. During 1938 and 1939, belt armour up to 4.5 inches (110 mm) thick was fitted along the waterline to provide additional protection to the propulsion machinery.

== Acquisition and construction ==
Australia was ordered in 1924 as part of a five-year plan to develop the RAN. She was laid down by John Brown & Company at its shipyard in Clydebank, Scotland, on 26 August 1925. The cruiser was launched on 17 March 1927 by Dame Mary Cook, wife of Sir Joseph Cook, the Australian High Commissioner to the United Kingdom and former Australian Prime Minister.

The cruiser was initially fitted with short exhaust funnels, but during sea trials of Australia and other Kent-class ships, it was found that smoke from the boilers was affecting the bridge and aft control position. The funnel design was subsequently lengthened by 15 feet (4.6 m); the taller funnels on the under-construction HMAS Canberra were later switched over to Australia as she neared completion.

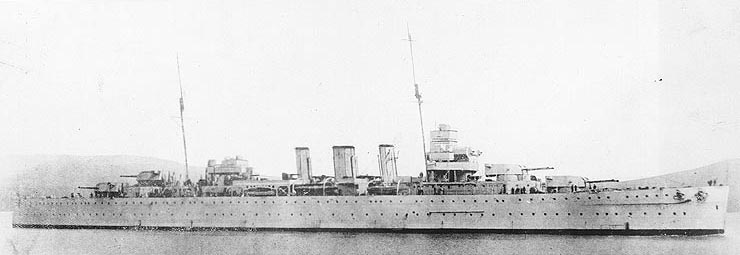
Australia under way during sea trials. The original, shorter exhaust funnels are still fitted to the cruiser.

When the ship's badge came up for consideration on 26 December 1926, both Richard Lane-Poole, commander of the Australian Squadron, and William Napier, First Naval Member of the Australian Commonwealth Naval Board disapproved of the design previously carried by the battlecruiser Australia, and requested new designs. On 26 July 1927, it was decided to use the Coat of arms of Australia as the basis for the badge, with the shield bearing the symbols of the six states and the Federation Star crest depicted in the design. No motto was given to the ship, but when the badge design was updated prior to the planned 1983 acquisition of the British aircraft carrier HMS Invincible (which was to be renamed HMAS Australia), the motto from the battlecruiser, "Endeavour", was added.

The warship was commissioned into the RAN on 24 April 1928. Construction of Australia cost 1.9 million pounds, very close to the estimated cost. Australia and sister ship HMAS Canberra (also constructed by John Brown) were the only County-class vessels built in Scotland.

== Operational history ==
=== Early career ===
Australia left Portsmouth for her namesake country on 3 August 1928 after completing sea trials. During the voyage, the cruiser visited Canada, the United States of America, several Pacific islands, and New Zealand before she reached Sydney on 23 October. Following the start of the Great Depression, the RAN fleet was downscaled in 1930 to three active ships (Australia, Canberra, and seaplane carrier Albatross) while one of the S-class destroyers would remain active at a time, with a reduced ship's company. In 1932, Australia cruised to the Pacific islands. In 1933, she visited New Zealand.

On 10 December 1934, Australia was sent to the United Kingdom on exchange duty, with the Duke of Gloucester, who had visited Victoria for the state's centenary of foundation the month previous, aboard. The cruiser reached Portsmouth on 28 March 1935, and was assigned to the Mediterranean Fleet. Australia returned to England from 21 June to 12 September to represent Australia at King George V's Silver Jubilee Naval Review at Spithead. Following the outbreak of the Abyssinian crisis, Australia began to train for a potential war. Australia's initial role in any British assault on the Italian Navy was to cover the withdrawal of the aircraft carrier HMS Glorious after an air attack on the base at Taranto. The crisis eased before the need for British involvement occurred. Australia remained in the Mediterranean until 14 July 1936, then visited Gallipoli in company with the new light cruiser HMAS Sydney, before the two ships sailed for Australia. They arrived in Sydney on 11 August. During the cruiser's time on exchange, the British cruiser HMS Sussex operated with the RAN.

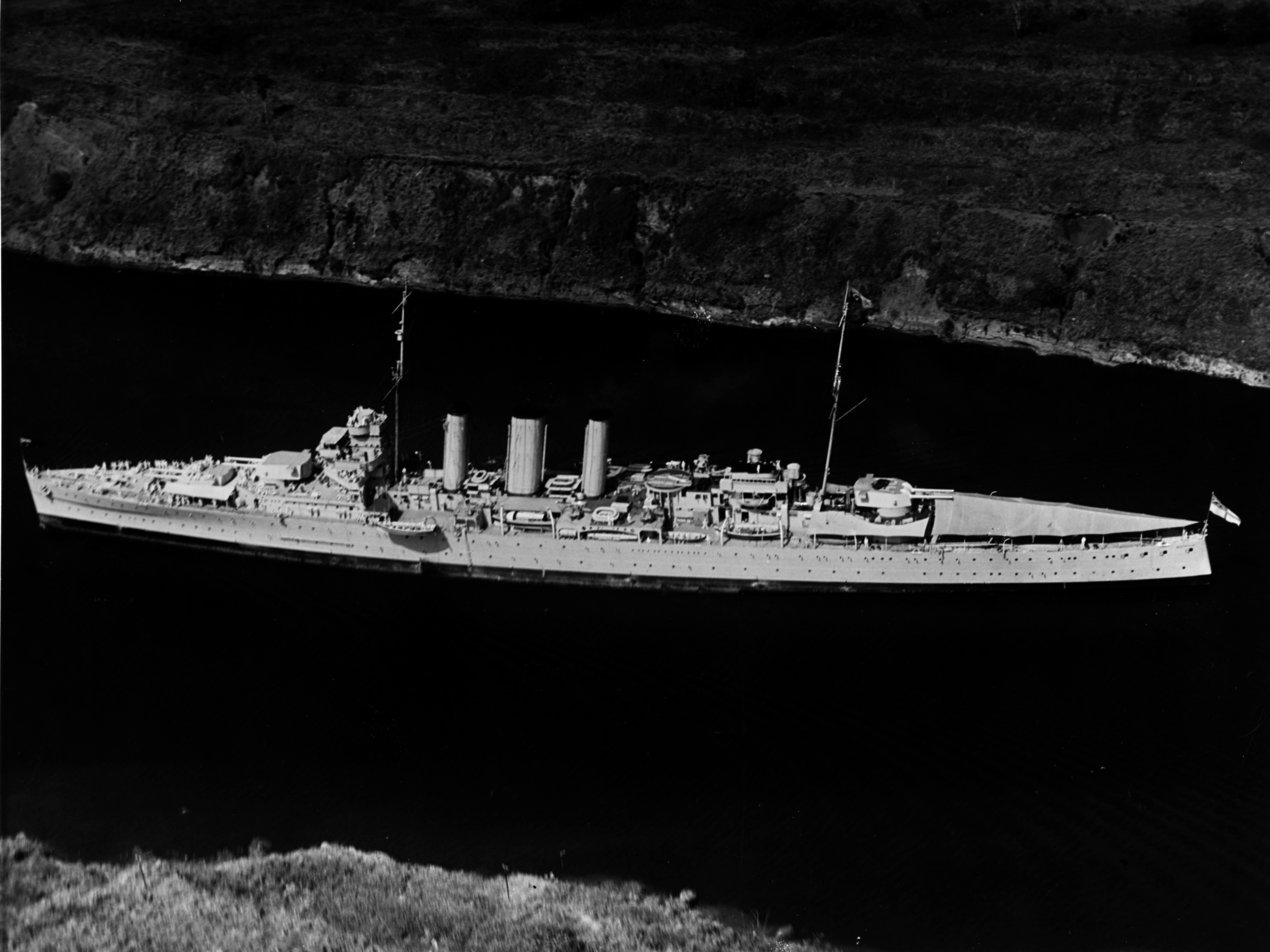
Australia transiting the Panama Canal in March 1935

After returning, Australia spent the remainder of 1936 in the vicinity of Sydney and Jervis Bay, excluding a visit to Melbourne in November. The warship sailed to New Zealand in April 1937, then in July departed on a three-month northern cruise, with visits to ports in Queensland, New Guinea, and New Britain. Australia repeated her November visit to Melbourne, and cruised to Hobart in February 1938, before being placed in reserve on 24 April 1938. She underwent a modernisation refit at Cockatoo Island Dockyard, during which her single 4-inch guns were replaced with twin mountings, belt armour measuring up to 4.5 inches (110 mm) thick was fitted over the machinery spaces, and handling arrangements for the ship's aircraft and boats were improved. Although the modernisation was scheduled for completion in March 1939, inconsistencies between Australia's construction and the supplied drawings caused delays. The cruiser was recommissioned on 28 August, but did not leave the dockyard until 28 September.

=== World War II ===
==== 1939–1941 ====
Following the outbreak of World War II, Australia was initially assigned to Australian waters. From 28 November to 1 December, Australia, Canberra, and Sydney hunted for the German pocket battleship Admiral Graf Spee in the Indian Ocean. From 10 to 20 January 1940, Australia was part of the escort for Anzac convoy US 1 as it proceeded from Sydney to Fremantle, then sailed with it to the edge of the Australia Station en route to Colombo, before returning to Fremantle. On arrival, Australia relieved HMAS Adelaide as the cruiser assigned to the western coast until 6 February, when she was in turn relieved by HMAS Sydney and returned to the east coast. On 12 May, Australia and Canberra left Fremantle to escort Anzac convoy US 3 to Cape Town. After arriving on 31 May, the two ships were offered for service under the Royal Navy; Australia was accepted for service in European waters, although she spent most of June escorting ship around southern and western Africa.

On 3 July, Australia and the carrier HMS Hermes were ordered to sail to Dakar, where the cruiser HMS Dorsetshire was shadowing the French battleship Richelieu and preparing to deny her use to the Vichy French if required. Australia and Hermes reached the rendezvous in the early morning of 5 July. Attempts to disable the battleship were made by boat and air during 7 and 8 July; on the second day, Australia fired in anger for the first time when a French aircraft flew near the Allied ships and dropped bombs with no effect. The Australian cruiser left Dakar on 9 July, and caught up to an England-bound convoy two days later. They arrived at the River Clyde on 16 July, and Australia was assigned to the Royal Navy's 1st Cruiser Squadron, based at Scapa Flow, four days later. During late July, the cruiser joined British ships off Norway in an unsuccessful search for the German battleship Gneisenau. During August, Australia and HMS Norfolk searched around the Faroe Islands and Bear Island for German trawlers.

At the start of September, Australia was assigned to Operation Menace (the Allied effort to install the Free French in Vichy-controlled Dakar) as a replacement for the torpedoed British cruiser Fiji. On the morning of 19 September, shortly after relieving HMS Cumberland on patrol off Dakar, Australia located three French cruisers, which she and Cumberland began to shadow until losing sight in the dark. One of the French ships, the cruiser Gloire suffered engine troubles and turned back to Konakri, encountering Australia shortly after. The Australian cruiser was ordered to escort Gloire to Casablanca, which the French cruiser agreed to. The two ships remained together until the morning of 21 September, when Gloire's captain promised his opposite on Australia that the French ship would complete the voyage unescorted, and the Australian cruiser sailed to intercept the main body of the Allied fleet, which was met the next day. On the morning of 23 September, the cruiser was fired on by shore batteries at Dakar while intercepting and driving back two Fantasque-class destroyers, but did not receive damage. That afternoon, Australia and the British destroyers Fury and Greyhound engaged the French destroyer L'Audacieux, setting her on fire. On 24 September, despite poor visibility, Australia joined other Allied ships in shelling Dakar and the French warships in the harbour; during the withdrawal to the rest of the fleet, the Australian cruiser was unsuccessfully attacked by high-altitude bombers. On 25 September, Australia and HMS Devonshire shelled French ships anchored at Dakar. They damaged a destroyer and several cruisers before Australia was hit by two 6-inch shells and her Walrus was shot down with all aboard killed, after which the two ships withdrew. Operation Menace was abandoned as a failure on 26 September, and Australia was ordered to return to the United Kingdom two days later.

During early October, Australia escorted a group of troop transports returning from Gibraltar to the United Kingdom. On 29 October, Australia recovered nine of the thirteen crew from a Short Sunderland flying boat which crashed off Greenock, Scotland during a gale; the other four were carried away by the heavy seas during the rescue. The cruiser underwent a refit in Liverpool during November and December. During a German air raid on the night of 20 December, a 3,500-pound (1,600 kg) torpedo was dropped on the dry-dock Australia was berthed in, but this landed alongside the ship and did not explode. The ship was damaged during an air raid the following night: the blast from a 500-pound (230 kg) bomb landing near the port side cracked several scuttles and damaged the catapult.

Australia spent the first part of January 1941 escorting Convoy WS5B from the British Isles to the Middle East via South Africa. On 22 January, after handing the convoy over to HMS Hawkins off Mombasa, the cruiser joined the unsuccessful search for the German pocket battleship Admiral Scheer. Following this and searches for the auxiliary cruisers Pinguin and Atlantis in the Indian Ocean, Australia sailed for Sydney with two troopships, arriving on 24 March. The cruiser then escorted Convoy US10 for the first leg of the Australia to Suez run, after which she sailed to Singapore at the end of the month to collect Admiral Ragnar Colvin and his staff following the Singapore Conference.

During June, Australia escorted convoys across the Tasman Sea, then delivered Convoy US11A to Trincomalee in mid-July. The ship was then assigned to the South Atlantic Station. During November, the cruiser sailed to the Kerguelen Islands during searches for German commerce raiders, and after finding evidence of enemy activity, deployed magnetic sea mines in case they returned. As of 2008, the mines were still present. Prompted by the loss of HMAS Sydney and the deteriorating situation in South-east Asia, Australia was ordered on 3 December to hand Convoy WS12X to HMS Dorsetshire, then make for home. On 29 December, the cruiser was designated Flagship of the Australian Squadron.

==== 1942 ====
On 31 January, Australia and HMNZS Leander sailed from Sydney to Wellington. In February 1942, the Australian cruiser became flagship of the newly formed ANZAC Squadron. In early March, Australia was assigned to shell Gasmata in New Britain. However, on 7 March, the ships for the operation were recalled, and were used three days later to provide long-range protection for the American aircraft carriers USS Lexington and USS Yorktown while they launched an air raid in retaliation to the Japanese capture of Lae and Salamaua. After the raid, Australia and the Anzac Squadron sailed for Nouméa.

On the evening of 12 March, while sailing near the Louisiade Islands, one of the ship's stokers was stabbed fourteen times, and died from peritonitis during the night. Before dying, the stoker informed the ship's surgeon that he had threatened to expose the homosexual relationship between two other stokers, which led to the attack. The two accused stokers were imprisoned, and a court-martial was held between 15 and 18 March, while the ship was anchored at Nouméa. The stokers were found guilty of the first ever murder aboard an Australian warship; under British naval regulations (which the RAN was operating under), the men were to be hanged from the cruiser's yardarm. However, despite Captain Harold Farncomb's aggressive prosecution of the two men, he successfully requested that the death sentences be put off at least until the ship returned home. As the men were convicted under British military law, the matter of commuting their sentences was out of Australian hands until an appeal for clemency was made to King George VI, who downgraded the sentence to life imprisonment. This situation had arisen because the Australian government had not yet adopted the Statute of Westminster 1931, a British Act which defined the Dominions as sovereign governments capable of amending or repealing previous British legislation affecting them, while preventing the British government from legislating on the Dominions' behalf unless requested. Prompted by the murder, along with issues relating to the legal control of shipping in Australian ports, and the National Security Act, a bill ratifying the Statute was passed on 9 October and backdated to the start of the war. The sentences of the two stokers were reduced several times, and they were freed in September 1950.

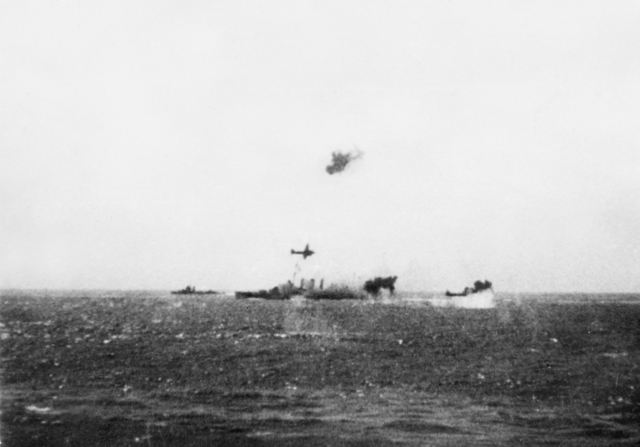
A Mitsubishi G4M bomber attacking Australia

On 22 April, the Anzac Squadron was reclassified as Task Force 44; Australia remained flagship. Australia returned to Sydney in late April for a week of repairs and maintenance, primarily to the outer port propeller shaft. Around this time, the Americans learned of an imminent Japanese invasion of Port Moresby, and on 1 May, Australia sailed with Hobart to rendezvous with American forces in the Coral Sea. At 07:00 on 7 May, Rear Admiral John Gregory Crace, who was embarked aboard Australia as commander of Task Force 44, was ordered to take his ships (Australia, the cruisers Hobart and USS Chicago, and the destroyers USS Perkins, USS Walke and USS Farragut) to the Jomard Passage, and engage any Japanese ships found en route to Port Moresby, while several US carrier groups engaged a Japanese force headed for the Solomon Islands. The ships reached their patrol area around 14:00, fired on a group of eleven unidentified aircraft at maximum range with no damage dealt at 14:27, and were attacked themselves by twelve Japanese twin-engine torpedo bombers at 15:06. Australia and Chicago were able to manoeuvre out of the torpedoes' paths, and at least five aircraft were destroyed. At 15:16, nineteen Japanese heavy bombers dropped their payload on the Allied ships. Although accurate (Australia was surrounded by the spread), none of the ships were hit directly, and the only casualties (aboard Chicago) were from shrapnel. A few minutes later, the ships were attacked by another three heavy bombers, flying at a higher altitude to the first group; the bombing was much less accurate. It was later learned that the three aircraft belonged to the United States Army Air Forces (USAAF). Although USN Vice Admiral Herbert F. Leary made plans to train aircrews in naval vessel recognition in response, USAAF General George Brett refused to implement them or acknowledge that the friendly fire incident had happened. With no new orders, Crace decided to relocate his ships during the night to a point 220 nautical miles (410 km; 250 mi) from Port Moresby, to better intercept a Japanese invasion force if it came through either the Jomard Passage or the China Strait. Instructions from the American commander of the operation were still not forthcoming, and Crace was forced to rely on intercepted radio messages to track the progress of the main battle. Australia and the rest of the task force remained in their assigned area until 01:00 on 10 May, when Crace ordered them to withdraw south to Cid Harbour on Whitsunday Island; the lack of reports and intelligence concerning either the Americans or Japanese led him to conclude that both forces had withdrawn, and there was no immediate threat to Port Moresby.

On 13 June, Crace was replaced by Rear Admiral Victor Crutchley as commander of Task Force 44 and the flag officer embarked aboard Australia. A month later, on 14 July, Australia led Task Force 44 from Brisbane to rendezvous in Wellington with the amphibious assault force for the landings at Guadalcanal and the surrounding islands. The force left New Zealand for Fiji on 22 July, and conducted rehearsal landings at Koro Island from 28 to 31 July. They met the rest of the attack force (three carrier groups and more transports) south of Fiji on the evening of 1 August, then headed for the Solomon Islands. The various elements began to head for their positions on 6 August, with Australia leading Squadron X (with four other cruisers, nine destroyers, nine transports, and six store ships) towards the main landing site, on the north side of Guadalcanal. During the early morning of 7 August, Squadron X transited the channel between Guadalcanal and Savo Island, and reached the assault point off Lunga Point at 06:47. While moving into position, Australia and the other warships fired on shore targets sporadically, then commenced a coordinated bombardment before the first wave of landing craft hit the beach unopposed just after 08:00. Despite the efforts of the carrier air groups and interdiction attacks on Japanese air bases, the first of several retaliatory air attacks against Squadron X occurred at 13:23; each was driven off by the squadron's massed anti-aircraft fire, with no damage to Australia. Anticipating a naval attack to occur during the night, Crutchley split his forces around Savo Island, with Australia leading Canberra, USS Chicago, and two destroyers on patrol of the southern waters, a second group of three heavy cruisers and two destroyers to patrol the northern passage, while the rest of the ships protected the transports or served as picket ships. Nothing occurred during the night of 7–8 August, and the same arrangement was assumed at 18:30 for the night of 8–9 August. At 20:45, Crutchley was recalled to meet urgently with US Admiral Richmond K. Turner, overall commander of the amphibious landings, aboard the transport USS McCawley to discuss the proposed withdrawal of the carrier groups, and Australia left the patrol group. The meeting concluded at 01:15 on 9 August, and instead of returning to the southern patrol, Crutchley ordered Australia to patrol around the transports. Just before 02:00, the southern patrol force was attacked by a six-ship Japanese task force, and Canberra was irreparably damaged. Three US cruisers were lost in the subsequent attack on the northern patrol force.

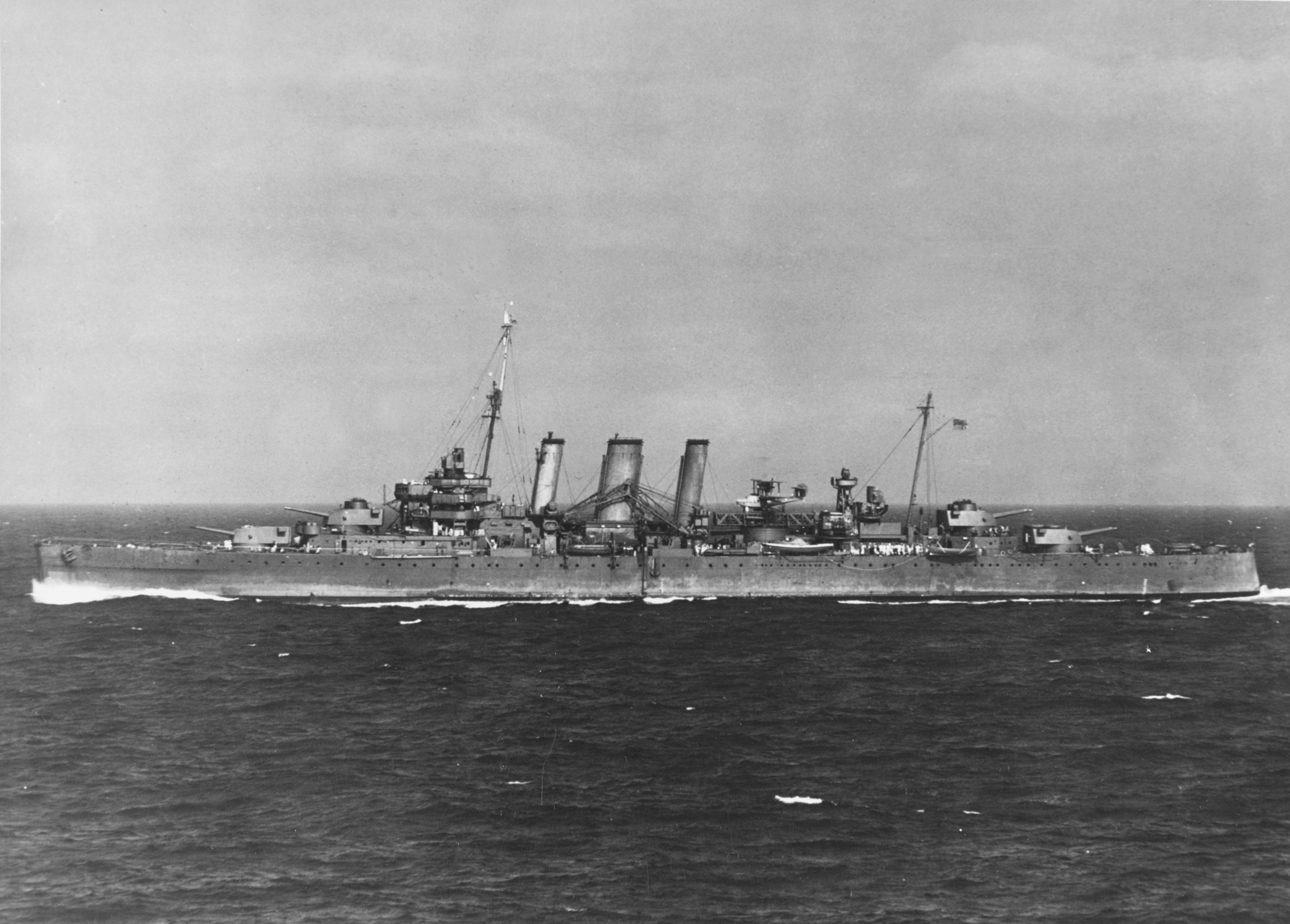
Australia under way off the Solomon Islands in late August 1942

Once the transports completed unloading, the naval force withdrew over the course of 9 August; Australia reached Nouméa on 13 August. The ships of Task Force 44 were replenished at Nouméa, then sailed to rejoin the three carrier groups on 19 August, in response to intelligence that a large Japanese fleet was sailing to the Solomon Islands. After arrival on 21 August, Crutchley and Australia were placed in command of the carriers' combined surface defence group, including several cruisers and the battleship USS North Carolina. Air attacks between the Allied and Japanese forces occurred during 24–25 August; the Japanese fleet was driven off without Australia or the other warships having to engage directly. On 31 August, Task Force 44 was detached from the carrier groups and sailed for Brisbane, arriving on 3 September. Four days later, Australia sailed with the task force for Milne Bay, where Allied ships and shore positions had been attacked several times by Japanese warships. Task Force 44 did not make contact with any enemy vessels. After this, the ships were assigned to patrol the Coral Sea.

==== 1943 ====
Australia and the rest of Task Force 44 were removed from patrol duties on 10 January 1943; no Japanese aircraft or ships were sighted during the three months on station. Task Force 44 was pulled back and split into smaller groups: two rapid response forces, and a third (made up of Australia and three American destroyers) sent to Moreton Bay for exercises. In early February, Australia's group sailed to Sydney, where the cruiser was fitted with a new radar, then proceeded on 17 February to meet the convoy returning the 9th Division from the Middle East. The convoy arrived in Fremantle on 18 February, then sailed for the Great Australian Bight, where Australia and her escorts met them. The ships reached Sydney on 27 February without incident, and Australia and her destroyers returned to northern waters.

On 15 March 1943, a new numbering system for USN fleets saw Task Force 44 become Task Force 74 of the United States Seventh Fleet. On 11 April, Australia was sent to investigate rumours of Japanese landings along the south-eastern shore of the Gulf of Carpentaria, but found no evidence of Japanese activity. The ships of the task force continued on with convoy escorting, refits, and patrols until 29 June, when Australia and five other ships were deployed to keep the sea lines of communication through the Coral and Arafura seas, and to assist any transports in these areas. After encountering no Japanese forces and receiving no calls for assistance, the ships withdrew to the Flinders Group on 4 July. Six days later, Task Force 74 was sent to Espiritu Santo to reinforce the United States Third Fleet, which had lost four cruisers to torpedoes (one sunk, three withdrawn for major repairs) while supporting the New Georgia Campaign. Arriving on 16 July, Australia and the other ships were assigned to Espiritu Santo's western waters. At sunset on 20 July, Task Force 74 was returning to Espiritu Santo when HMAS Hobart was torpedoed by a Japanese submarine: Crutchley believed that the submarine had fired at Australia at long range, but the speed of the task force may have been underestimated, causing the torpedoes to miss the heavy cruiser, while one hit the following Hobart.

By October, Australia was back in Australian waters. At the start of the month, the cruiser was the only ship assigned to Task Force 74, but she was joined by the destroyer USS Bagley on 13 October, and the two ships arrived at Milne Bay two days later, in case of retaliatory sea attacks on the recently captured town of Finschhafen. The counterattack did not come, and the two ships sailed for Brisbane on 21 October, where the task force was built up to two cruisers and four destroyers. The ships then sailed for Milne Bay, where they remained until they were ordered to Port Purvis on Florida Island, in the Solomons, on 11 November to serve as support for the Third Fleet following the start of the Bougainville invasion. Although Australia and the task force arrived on 13 November, they were ordered to return to Milne Bay two days later, as a USN cruiser division had arrived. On 15 December 1943, Australia and Task Force 74 participated in the landings at Arawe, through escorting the landing force, then performing pre-landing bombardment. Australia also led the landing and escort force for the landing at Cape Gloucester, departing from Milne Bay on the evening of 25 December. At 06:00 on 26 December, Australia commenced a two-and-a-half-hour shelling of targets near the Gloucester airstrip prior to the landing, after which she sailed to Buna, where she remained for the rest of the year.

==== 1944 ====
In early January 1944, Australia returned to Milne Bay, before sailing to Sydney on 12 January for an eight-week refit. During the refit, Captain Farncomb was replaced by Captain Emile Dechaineux. On the morning of 7 February, Crutchley transferred his flag to HMAS Shropshire; the role of Flagship was returned to Australia on 21 March, three days after she rejoined Task Force 74 at Milne Bay. On the morning of 20 April, Australia and Task Force 74 rendezvoused with three other task forces of the Seventh Fleet off Manus Island: the combined force was to support the amphibious landings at Aitape, Humboldt Bay, and Tanahmerah Bay. The next evening, Australia split off with her task force and the attack force for Tanahmerah Bay. The flotilla arrived off the bay at 03:00 on 22 April, and at 06:00, Australia led a half-hour shore bombardment to cover the first wave of the amphibious landing. After the bombardment, which allowed the 24th Infantry Division to land with minimal opposition, the warships withdrew to protect the transports. Later in the day, Australia led two destroyers along the coastline, destroying any Japanese barges or supply dumps they encountered. Task Force 74 remained in the Hollandia area for the rest of the month to provide support to the landed forces, and arrived in Seeadler Harbour on 4 May.

Australia and Task Force 74 returned to Tanahmerah Bay on 16 May, to escort troopships to Wakde Island. The task force left the troopships (which were also being escorted by Task Force 75) at 04:30 on 17 May, and commenced an hour-long shore bombardment of the area around Sawar and Sarmi just after 06:00. The task forces provided fire support during the Battle of Wakde, then sailed to Humboldt Bay for replenishment. On 25 May, the task force was temporarily redesignated Task Group 77.2, and sailed at 22:00 to provide escort, then fire support, for the amphibious landing at Biak. At 06:30 on 27 May, Australia bombarded Biak Island. Over the next few days, Australia and the ships under her command provided cover patrols and fire support for Allied forces ashore. Predicting a heavy naval response from the Japanese, Crutchley was ordered on 1 June to return to Humboldt Bay with Australia and Task Force 74, then form a combined fleet with Task Force 75, which was to take up station northeast of Biak nightly from 4 June and intercept any Japanese forces encountered. On the evening of 4 June, while en route, the fleet was attacked by Japanese dive-bombers; Australia was not damaged in the attack. Crutchley's force was withdrawn on 6 June to replenish at Humboldt Bay, then returned the next day. Aerial sightings of a Japanese force (three destroyers towing landing barges and three destroyers escorting, one of which was sunk by air attack) had been made during the day, and the Allied ships made radar contact at 23:19. At 23:31, just after the Japanese ships fired torpedoes, Crutchley ordered the destroyers under his command to close and attack, while he brought Australia and the other cruisers into range. The Japanese ships cast off their barges, turned, and fled, and Crutchley ordered the Allied destroyers to chase until 02:30 on 8 June, then retire; the cruisers broke off almost immediately as could not match the Japanese destroyers' speed. The Japanese escaped with minimal damage.

On 12 June, the combined task force returned to Seeadler Harbour, and Crutchley left Australia, having completed his two-year assignment as Rear Admiral Commanding Australian Squadron. A day later, Commodore John Augustine Collins raised his flag on Australia as commander of both the Australian Squadron and Task Force 74; the first graduate of the Royal Australian Naval College placed in overall command of the RAN's ships. Australia spent most of June in harbour, and sailed on 24 June with Task Forces 74 and 75 to perform a pre-landing shore bombardment for the attack on Noemfoor Island. On the morning of 2 July, Australia bombarded Noemfoor Island, then was released before midday to sail for Hollandia, then on to Seeadler Harbour. on 12 July, Australia led Task Force 74 to Aitape, where the warships were to provide naval gunfire support for Allied forces ashore, help in the interdiction of Japanese troop movements by barge along the coast, and destroy gun emplacements covering the surrounding waterways. On 14 July, Australia bombarded the Yakamal area of Aitape, then shelled the Marubian area on 17 July, before attacking Yakamal again on 20 July. On 22 July, Collins transferred his flag to Shropshire, and Australia departed with HMAS Warramunga for maintenance dockings in Sydney.

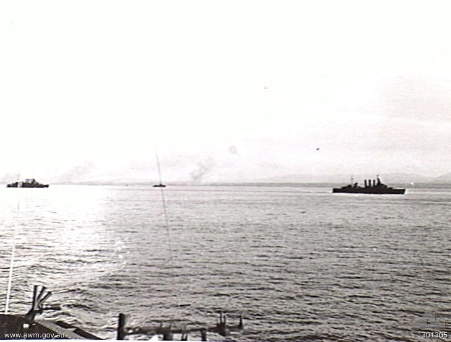
Australia (right) and Shropshire (left) shelling Morotai Island

The cruiser departed Sydney on 26 August in the company of twelve other ships from Task Forces 74 and 75; the combined force reached Seeadler Harbour on 1 September. Collins reembarked on 3 September, and Australia was assigned to the Morotai landings as lead ship of Task Group 75.2, part of the escort and bombardment force. The cruiser shelled the area around the landing site on Cape Gila from 06:50 to 07:40 on 15 September; this was cut short by ten minutes, as shell fragments from Australia were reported as falling close to the destroyer USS Fletcher, which was positioned to cover the landings from the other side of the cape. The cruiser remained on station to provide fire support until the evening of 16 September, when Australia and the other ships normally assigned to Task Force 74 were permitted to withdraw to Mios Woendi. Australia remained there until 27 September, when Task Forces 74 and 75 sailed for Manus Island, where they were involved in exercising. During this time, the cruiser was visited by British Admiral of the Fleet Lord Roger Keyes.

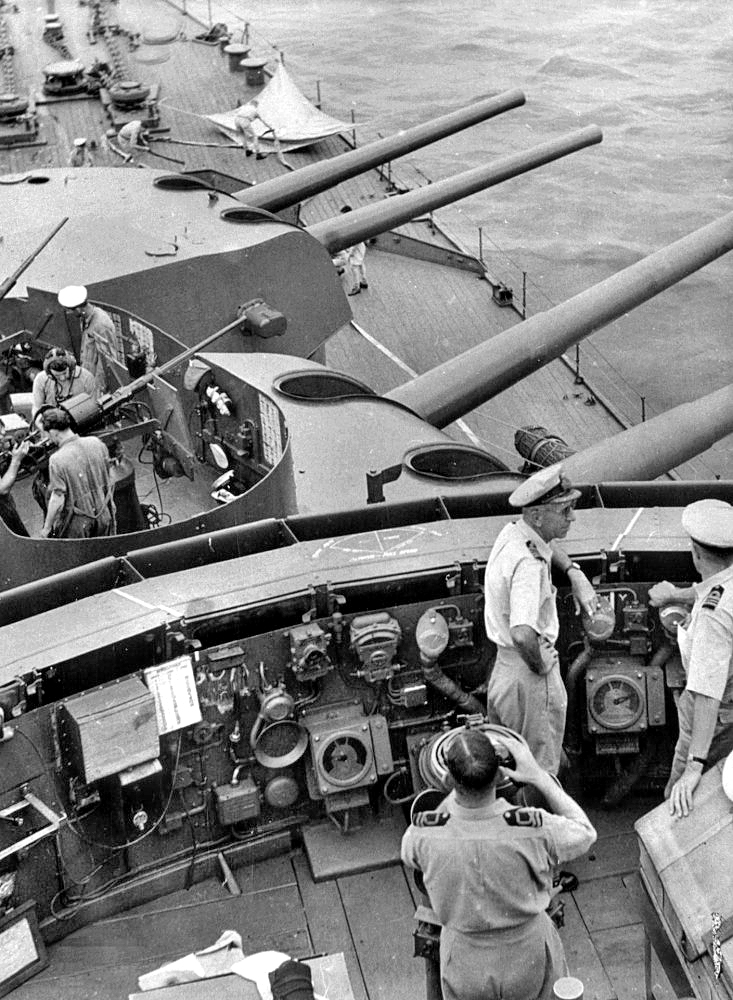
The bridge and forward superstructure of Australia in September 1944. This area was damaged when a Japanese bomber collided with the ship on 21 October 1944. Captain Emile Dechaineux (white uniform, facing right), was among those killed

Task Force 74 was absorbed on 11 October into Task Unit 77.3.2, assigned to provide close cover for the landing force in the operation to recapture Leyte, and departed that day for Hollandia. At 15:30 on 13 October, Task Group 77.3 (including Australia and her companions) began the seven-day voyage to Leyte. At 09:00 on 20 October, Australia commenced shelling targets prior to the amphibious landings, then was positioned to provide gunfire support and attack targets of opportunity throughout the day. At around 06:00 on 21 October, Japanese aircraft attacked attempted to bomb the Allied ships in Leyte Bay. An Aichi D3A dive-bomber dove for Shropshire, but broke away after heavy anti-aircraft fire was directed at it. The Aichi, damaged by Bofors fire, turned and flew at low level up the port side of the nearby Australia, before striking the cruiser's foremast with its wingroot. Although the bulk of the aircraft fell overboard, the bridge and forward superstructure were showered with debris and burning fuel. Seven officers (including Captain Dechaineux) and twenty-three sailors were killed by the collision, while another nine officers (including Commodore Collins), fifty-two sailors, and an AIF gunner were wounded. Observers aboard Australia and nearby Allied ships differed in their opinions of the collision; some thought that it was an accident, while the majority considered it to be a deliberate ramming aimed at the bridge. Following the attack, commander Harley C. Wright assumed temporary control of the ship. Although historian George Hermon Gill claims in the official war history of the RAN that Australia was the first Allied ship hit by a kamikaze attack, other sources, such as Samuel Eliot Morison in History of United States Naval Operations in World War II disagree as it was not a preplanned suicide attack (the first attack where the pilots were ordered to ram their targets occurred four days later), but was most likely performed on the pilot's own initiative, and similar attacks by damaged aircraft had occurred as early as 1942.

Australia sailed for Kossol Passage on the afternoon of the attack, in company with HMAS Warramunga and the US Ships Honolulu (also damaged during the Leyte invasion) and Richard P. Leary. On 24 October, the Australian ships proceeded to Manus, then sailed to Espiritu Santo for repairs. Work on Australia was completed by 28 November, and she rejoined the joint Australian-American task force (at that point operating under the designation 74.1) on 4 December. Five days later, Farncomb, now a commodore, rejoined Australia to replace Collins.

==== 1945 ====
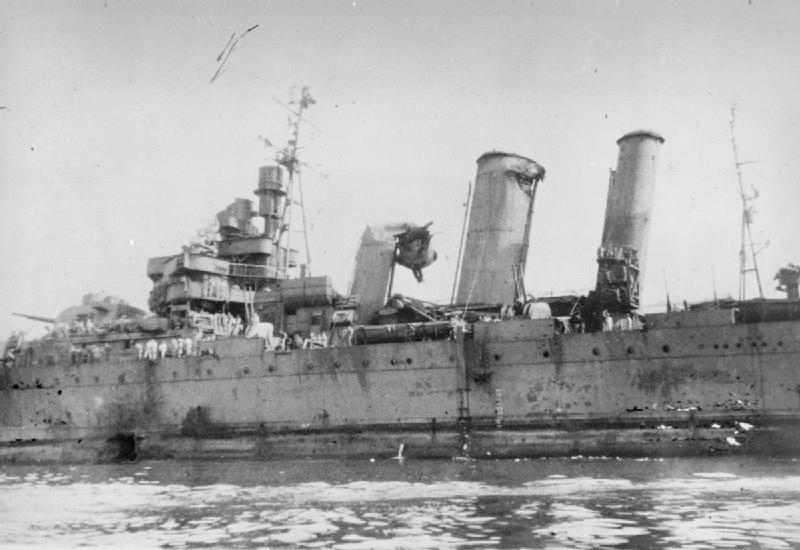
Australia in January 1945 showing accumulated damage from kamikaze attacks

At the start of 1945, Australia and the ships under her command were absorbed into Task Group 77.2, the escort and fire support force for the invasion of Lingayen Gulf. Australia brought up the rear of the Task Group when it sailed from Leyte on the morning of 3 January, and was to be tasked with providing fire support for the landings at San Fabian. Numerous kamikaze attacks were attempted on the invasion force as it sailed to Lingayen Gulf; Australia was struck portside amidships at 17:35 on 5 January. 25 were killed and 30 were wounded (officer casualties numbered 3 and 1 respectively), mostly from the gun crews of the port-side secondary and anti-aircraft guns, but the physical damage was not considered severe enough to withdraw her from the operation. The ships reached the gulf early on 6 January, and by 11:00, Australia had commenced pre-landing bombardment. A second kamikaze rammed the cruiser at 17:34 between the starboard 4-inch guns, killing 14 and wounding 26. The casualties again consisted primarily of gun crews, and after this point, there were only enough trained personnel to man one 4-inch gun on each side of the cruiser. Another aircraft attempted to ram Australia at 18:28, but this was shot down by USS Columbia, itself damaged by kamikaze strikes during the day, before it could strike. Australia, assigned to a counter-battery role, saw little activity during 7 January. The next day, she was attacked twice by kamikazes in quick succession: at 07:20, a twin-engine bomber hit the water 20 yards (18 m) from the cruiser and skidded to connect with the ship's port flank, then a second aircraft attacked at 07:39, again shot down just before it hit the port side at the waterline. A bomb carried by the second attacker opened a 14-by-8-foot (4.3 by 2.4 m) hole in the hull, causing a 5-degree list, but despite the explosion and a large quantity of debris and shrapnel, casualties were limited to a few cases of shock, and Australia was able to carry out the day's assigned bombardments. The landing force arrived on 9 January, and at 08:30, the cruiser began shelling targets in preparation for the amphibious assault. At 13:11, the fifth suicide aircraft to hit Australia during the operation struck; although it intended to take out the cruiser's bridge, the aircraft hit a mast strut and the forward exhaust funnel, and fell overboard. Although there were no casualties, the crash damaged the funnel, radar, and wireless systems, and the decision was made to withdraw the cruiser for repairs.

Australia joined several Allied ships damaged by kamikaze strikes in escorting the transport ships back to Leyte on the evening of 9 January. Temporary repairs were made to the cruiser, and after Farncomb transferred his flag to HMAS Arunta so he could return to the main force, Australia sailed to Sydney via Manus for permanent repairs and a refit, arriving home on 28 January. Two days later, she docked at Cockatoo Island for repair and the preliminary stages of the refit, including the removal of 'X' turret and the aircraft catapult, and the shortening of the funnels by 5 feet (1.5 m) each. However, Australian shipyards had been instructed to prioritise repairs to British Pacific Fleet vessels, so Australia left the dock on 17 May and sailed on 24 May for England via the Panama Canal. The cruiser arrived at Plymouth on 2 July, and was docked for a major refit which ran from August to December.

The ship received eight battle honours for her wartime service: "Atlantic 1940–41", "Pacific 1941–43", "Coral Sea 1942", "Savo Island 1942", "Guadalcanal 1942", "New Guinea 1942–44", "Leyte Gulf 1944", and "Lingayen Gulf 1945". According to naval historian John Bastock, Australia "probably fought more actions and steamed more miles than any other ship of the RAN" during the war.

=== Post-war ===
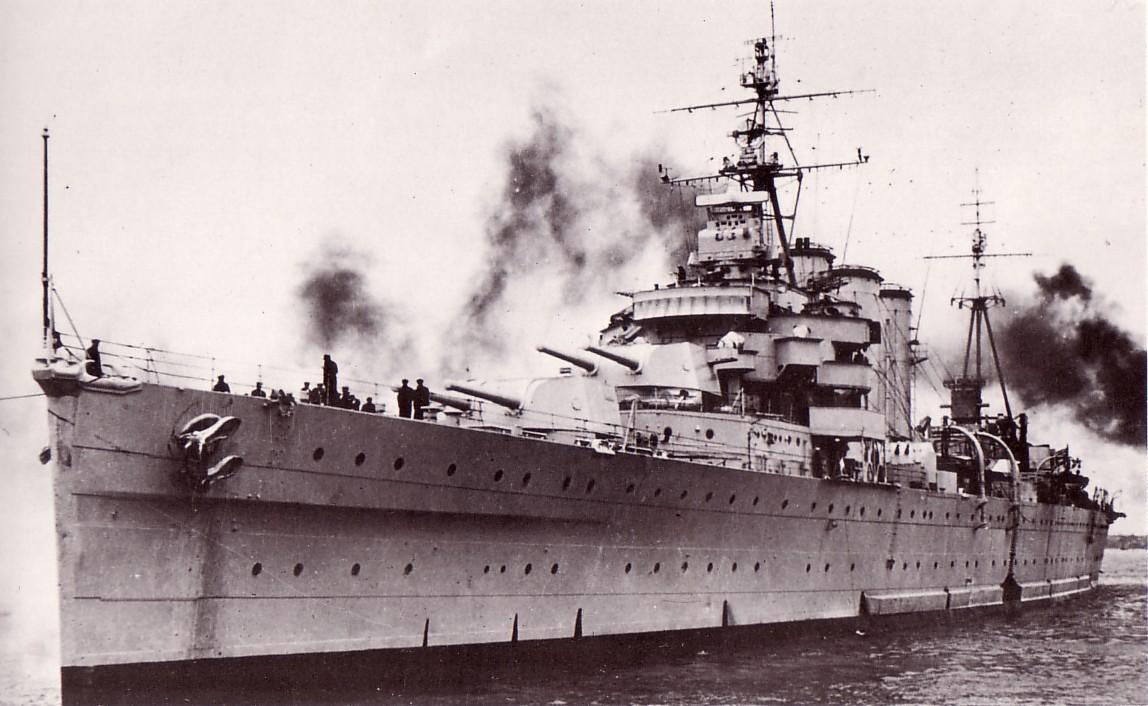
Australia in 1946 after post-war repairs

The cruiser returned to Sydney on 16 February 1946, and she was placed into reserve for the rest of the year, during which the final components of the refit were completed. On 16 June 1947, Australia was recommissioned and designated flagship of the Australia Squadron. On 18 August, the cruiser sailed to Tokyo to serve with the British Commonwealth Occupation Force. She remained in the region until the end of the year, and returned to Australia on 10 December. With the exceptions of visits to New Zealand in 1948 and New Guinea in 1949, Australia remained in home waters for the next three-and-a-half years. During 1949, the designation of Flagship was transferred to the light aircraft carrier HMAS Sydney. By the start of 1950, Australia had been reassigned to training duties.

Australia visited New Zealand from 24 February to 31 March 1950. The cruiser was deployed on a 'mercy mission' to Heard Island in late July, to collect the island's doctor, who had developed appendicitis, and transport him to the mainland for treatment. Given only 24 hours notice, the ship's company loaded provisions and cold-weather gear, while removing all unnecessary equipment to improve fuel consumption, before sailing on 27 July. Better-than-expected weather on the outbound voyage was countered by poor conditions at Heard Island, with Australia forced to loiter for a day before a boat could be safely launched to collect the doctor. The cruiser reached Fremantle on 14 August. Because of structural damage to Australia caused by Southern Ocean conditions, the Australian government announced that RAN vessels would not be deployed for similar incidents in the future, although the RAN performed three medical evacuations at the nearby Macquarie Islands in later years.

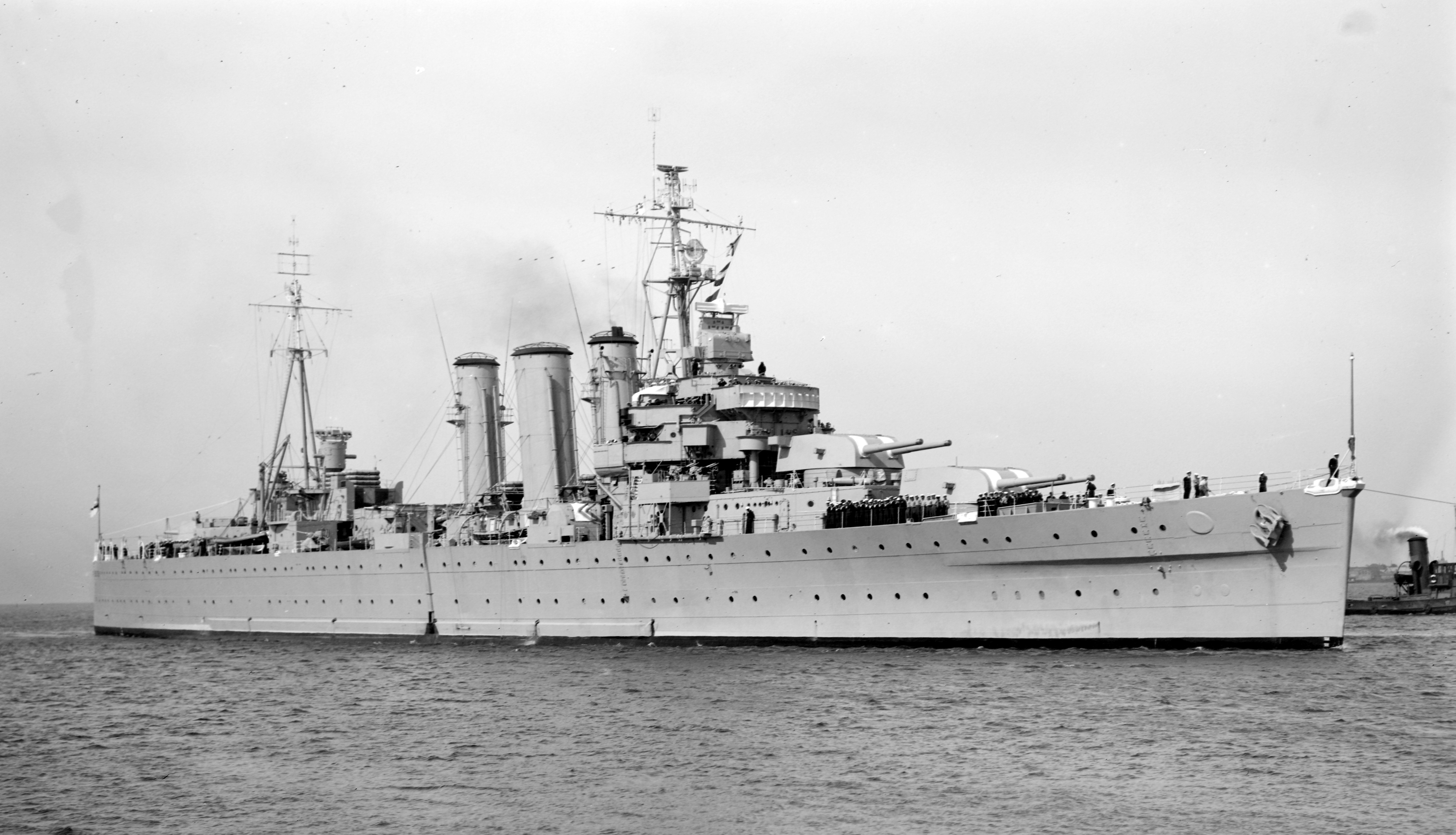
Australia in October 1953

During May 1951, Australia transported John Northcott, the Governor of New South Wales, to Lord Howe Island for jubilee celebrations. In July, the cruiser visited New Caledonia. During 1952, the cruiser visited New Guinea, New Britain, and the Solomon Islands, and undertook a training cruise to New Zealand from mid September to 6 October. Australia made a port visit to New Zealand in October 1953. During February and March 1954, the cruiser served as part of the escort for the Royal Yacht Gothic, during the Australian leg of Queen Elizabeth II's coronation world tour. Later, in May, Australia transported Governor-General Sir William Slim, along with his wife and staff, on a cruise of the Coral Sea, Great Barrier Reef, and Whitsunday Passage. During this voyage, a disabled Dutch landing ship was located and towed to Cairns.

== Decommissioning and fate ==
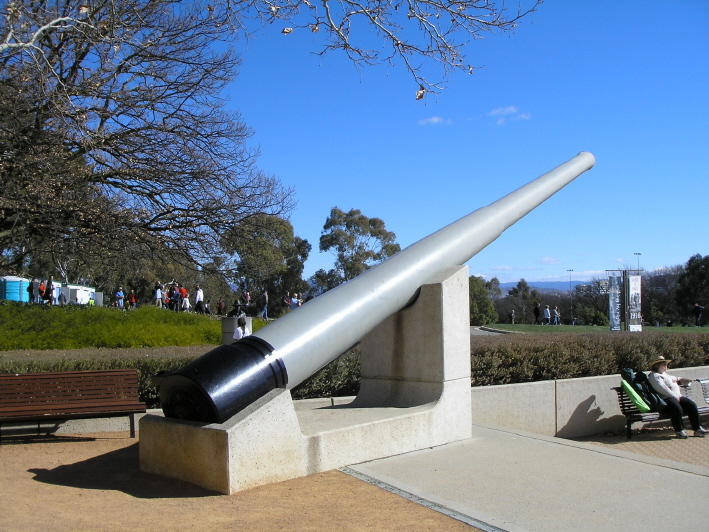
One of Australia's 8-inch gun barrels on display outside the Australian War Memorial

On 31 August 1954, Australia was paid off and marked for disposal. She had been in service for 26 years, the longest career of a RAN warship to that date. The ship was sold on 25 January 1955 to the British Iron & Steel Corporation for scrapping. On 26 March, the cruiser was towed from Sydney Harbour by the Dutch-flagged tugboat Rode Zee. The ships were later joined by two other tugs for the voyage to Barrow-in-Furness via the Suez Canal, where they arrived on 5 July. Australia was broken up at Thos W Ward's yard over the course of 1956.

One of the cruiser's 8-inch gun barrels is on display outside the Australian War Memorial. A memorial to the ship's company, particularly those killed during World War II, was unveiled at Henley Beach on 1 May 2011.
