= Harold Farncomb =

Royal Australian Navy officer

Rear-Admiral Harold Farncomb CB DSO MVO
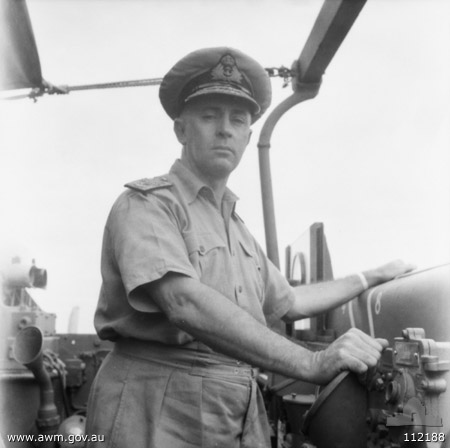
- Commodore Harold Farncomb on the bridge of HMAS Shropshire, July 1945
- Born: 28 February 1899; North Sydney, New South Wales
- Died: 12 February 1971 (aged 71); Darlinghurst, New South Wales
- Military career
- Allegiance: Australia
- Branch: Royal Australian Navy
- Service years: 1912–1951
- Rank: Rear-Admiral
- Nicknames: Uncle Hal, Fearless Frank
- Commands: HM Australian Squadron (1944–45, 1946–49); HMS Attacker (1944); HMAS Australia (1941–44); HMAS Canberra (1940–41); HMAS Perth (1939–40); HMAS Yarra (1937–38)
- Conflicts: First World War; Second World War; Battle of the Atlantic; Battle of the Mediterranean; Battle of the Coral Sea; Guadalcanal Campaign; Battle of the Eastern Solomons; Battle of Cape Gloucester; Battle of Luzon; Invasion of Lingayen Gulf
- Awards: Companion of the Order of the Bath; Distinguished Service Order; Member of the Royal Victorian Order; Mentioned in Despatches (3); Navy Cross (United States); Commander of the Legion of Merit (United States)
- Other work: Barrister and solicitor

Rear-Admiral Harold Bruce Farncomb, CB, DSO, MVO (28 February 1899 – 12 February 1971) was a senior officer in the Royal Australian Navy (RAN) who served in the First and Second World Wars, and as a lawyer. He was the first Australian-born RAN officer to reach a flag rank in the RAN. The Collins class submarine HMAS Farncomb is named in his honour.

== Early life ==
Harold Farncomb was born in North Sydney, New South Wales on 28 February 1899, the second child of Frank Farncomb and Helen Louisa Farncomb, née Sampson. The family lived in Gordon on the north shore of Sydney. He attended Gordon Public School and Sydney Boys' High School before entering the Royal Australian Naval College (RANC) at age 13 in the RANC's first intake. Farncomb excelled academically at the RANC, graduating with very impressive scores and topped his final year (1916). On completing his studies at the RANC he was promoted to midshipman on 1 January 1917 and left immediately on the steamer Naldera for training with the Royal Navy. Farncomb was stationed on board the battleship HMS Royal Sovereign in April 1917.

== Naval career ==
Farncomb served on Royal Sovereign until shortly after the end of World War I. On leaving Royal Sovereign Farncomb was promoted to sub-lieutenant and sent to HMS Excellent on Whale Island for course training. After completing training at Whale Island Farncomb was transferred to Woolsher, a small craft attached to the destroyer force at the Firth of Forth. He then received his first posting in Australia; stationed on board HMAS Stalwart for a year as a gunnery officer, this posting was followed by a year on the staff of Commodore Percy Addison, Commodore Commanding the Australia Squadron (CCAS). In May 1925, after a 10-month war staff course in the United Kingdom, he took a posting as a staff officer (operations) with the CCAS.

=== Naval career summary ===
1913	Royal Australian Naval College, Osborne House, Geelong, Victoria
1917	promoted midshipman
	HMS Royal Sovereign (in UK)
1918	promoted sub-lieutenant
	HMS Excellent (Whale Island, Hampshire)
1920	promoted lieutenant – awarded the maximum of five first-class certificates for his lieutenant's courses
1921	gunnery officer, HMAS Stalwart (in Australia)
1922	intelligence officer, Commodore (Sir) Percy Addison's staff on the flagship, HMAS Melbourne
1923	Royal Naval College, Greenwich
1925	staff officer (operations) to CCAS (Commodore Commanding the Australia Squadron)
1927	promoted lieutenant commander
1932	promoted commander
1933	executive officer, HMAS Australia
1934	made a Member of the Royal Victorian Order (MVO)
1935	Naval Intelligence Division at the Admiralty
1937	first RANC graduate to be promoted captain
	commander HMAS Yarra
1939	as commander, commissioned HMAS Perth
1940	commander HMAS Canberra
1941	commander of the flagship HMAS Australia, chief staff officer to Rear Admiral (Sir) John Crace
1942	Rear Admiral (Sir) Victor Crutchley replaced Crace
1943	made a Companion of the Distinguished Service Order (DSO). Citation: "For skill, resolution and coolness during operations in the Solomon Islands whilst commanding HMAS Australia"
1944	commander HMS Attacker (in the Mediterranean)
	assumed command of the Australian Squadron as commodore first class commodore commanding H.M.A. Squadron (Fleet)
1945	flag officer-in-charge, New South Wales
	commodore superintendent of training at Flinders Naval Depot, Westernport, Victoria
	made a Companion of the Order of the Bath (CB) and awarded the Navy Cross and made a Commander of the Legion of Merit by the United States
1946	commodore commanding H.M.A. Squadron (Fleet)
1947	promoted rear admiral
	flag officer commanding H.M.A. Squadron (Fleet)
1950	head of the Australian Joint Services Staff in Washington
1951	retired from Navy

== Post-military life ==
Farncomb left the service in 1951 and learned Latin to enable him to study for the Barristers' Admission Board examinations. Admitted to the Bar on 6 June 1958, he developed a reasonably busy practice in Sydney and subsequently joined the solicitors, Alfred Rofe & Sons. A street in the town of Narooma is named in Farncomb's honour.

Heart disease eventually led to his retirement.

== Personal life ==
On 31 March 1927 at Trinity Congregational Church, Strathfield, Sydney, he married Jean Ross Nott; they were to remain childless. "Jean provided staunch support throughout the vicissitudes of her husband's career".

== Retirement and death ==
Survived by his wife, Farncomb died of heart failure on 12 February 1971 in St Vincent's Hospital, Darlinghurst, and was cremated with Anglican rites. His ashes were scattered at sea on 2 March from the flight deck of his last flagship, HMAS Sydney, off the coast of Western Australia.

Military offices
Preceded by Commodore John Collins	Rear Admiral Commanding HM Australian Squadron; 1946–1949	Succeeded by Rear Admiral John Eccles as Flag Officer Commanding HM Australian Fleet
Preceded by Captain Charles Nichols	Rear Admiral Commanding HM Australian Squadron; 1944–1945	Succeeded by Commodore John Collins
