= Robin Dalglish =

Royal Navy admiral

Rear-Admiral Robin Dalglish CB
- Born: 3 December 1880; Dubbo, New South Wales, Australia
- Died: 17 December 1934 (aged 54)
- Military career
- Allegiance: United Kingdom
- Branch: Royal Navy
- Service years: 1885–1934
- Rank: Rear-Admiral
- Commands: HM Australian Squadron (1932–34); HMS Centaur (1928–30); HMS Barham (1920–22); HMS Ganges (1923); Harwich Docks (1923)
- Conflicts: First World War
- Awards: Companion of the Order of the Bath

Rear-Admiral Robin Campsie Dalglish, CB (3 December 1880 – 17 December 1934) was a senior officer in the Royal Navy. He represented Great Britain in Fencing at the 1920 and 1924 Summer Olympics. He was the first Australian-born admiral in the Royal Navy.

== Naval career ==
Born on 3 December 1880 in Dubbo, New South Wales, Australia, Dalglish's family returned to England in 1888. He joined the Royal Navy in 1895 as a cadet, was confirmed as sub-lieutenant on 15 July 1900, and in 1901 was at the Royal Naval College, Greenwich. On 5 August 1902 he was appointed to the torpedo boat destroyer HMS Success, serving in the Portsmouth instructional flotilla, and on 1 October 1902 he was promoted to lieutenant. He was appointed to HMS Bacchante in November 1902, as she commissioned to serve in the 3rd Cruiser Squadron, as part of the Mediterranean Squadron until 1904. In 1905, he served in HMS Leviathan, also of the 3rd Cruiser Squadron. Promoted to lieutenant commander, he served in HMS King George V in 1913 and at the outbreak of the First World War. He served in HMS Canada from 1915 to 1918 and participated in the Battle of Jutland. He was the Captain in charge of Harwich Docks and commanded Shotley Training Establishment in 1923. He was promoted to rear admiral on 4 April 1931 and appointed Rear Admiral Commanding HM Australian Squadron from 7 April 1932 until 19 April 1934. On 2 January 1933, he was appointed a Companion of the Order of the Bath.

Dalglish died of illness on 17 December 1934.

== Notes ==
Military offices
Preceded by Commodore Leonard Holbrook	Rear Admiral Commanding HM Australian Squadron; 1932–1934	Succeeded by Rear Admiral Wilbraham Ford
