= Wilfrid Patterson =

Royal Navy Admiral (1893–1954)

Admiral Sir Wilfrid Patterson KCB CVO CBE
- Portrait by Walter Stoneman, 1943
- Born: Wilfrid Rupert Patterson; 20 November 1893; Belfast, United Kingdom
- Died: 12 December 1954 (aged 61); Charing Cross, London, United Kingdom
- Military career
- Allegiance: United Kingdom
- Branch: Royal Navy
- Service years: 1906–1950
- Rank: Admiral
- Commands: 5th Cruiser Squadron (1945–1946); 2nd Cruiser Squadron (1944); HMS King George V (1940–1942); HMAS Canberra (1938–1940); HM Australian Squadron (1939); HMS Hawkins (1936–1938); HMS Folkestone (1935)
- Conflicts: First World War; Second World War
- Awards: Knight Commander of the Order of the Bath; Commander of the Order of the British Empire; Commander of the Royal Victorian Order; Mentioned in Despatches; Legion of Merit (United States)

Admiral Sir Wilfrid Rupert Patterson KCB CVO CBE (20 November 1893 – 15 December 1954) was a senior officer in the Royal Navy. He was the Commodore Commanding His Majesty's Australian Squadron from September to November 1939. He participated in the naval battle that sunk the German battleship Bismarck.

== Naval career ==
Born on 20 November 1893 in Belfast, Northern Ireland, the son of William Robert Patterson and Elizabeth Fleming. He joined the Royal Navy as a cadet on 15 September 1906 and specialised in gunnery. He was appointed the Commodore Commanding His Majesty's Australian Squadron between 2 September 1939 and 1 November 1939.

In recognition of the role played while commanding HMS King George V in the destruction of the Bismarck, he was made a Companion of the Order of the Bath on 14 October 1941. He was made a Commander of the Order of the British Empire on 11 June 1946.

He was present at the surrender of the Japanese army in Singapore 12 September 1945.

== Notes ==
Military offices
Preceded by Rear Admiral Wilfred Custance	Rear Admiral Commanding HM Australian Squadron; September – November 1939	Succeeded by Rear Admiral John Gregory Crace
