= John Eccles (Royal Navy officer) =

Royal Navy Admiral (1898-1966)

Admiral Sir John Eccles GCB KCVO CBE
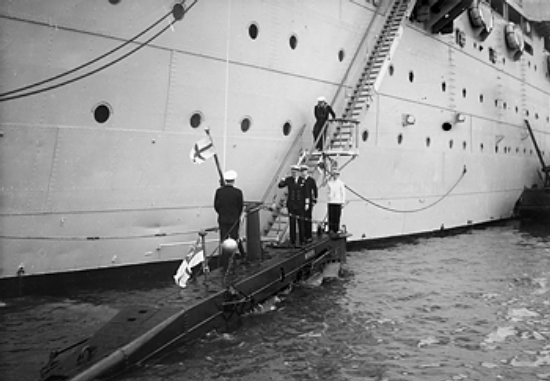
- Admiral Sir John Eccles, Commander in Chief Home Fleet, boarding X craft MINNOW at Portland
- Born: 20 June 1898; Marylebone, London
- Died: 1 March 1966 (aged 67); Winchester, Hampshire
- Military career
- Allegiance: United Kingdom
- Branch: Royal Navy
- Service years: 1916–1958
- Rank: Admiral
- Commands: Home Fleet (1955–58); HM Australian Fleet (1951–53); HMS Indomitable (1943–45); HMS Durban (1940–41)
- Conflicts: First World War; Second World War
- Awards: Knight Grand Cross of the Order of the Bath; Knight Commander of the Royal Victorian Order; Commander of the Order of the British Empire; Mentioned in dispatches

Admiral Sir John Arthur Symons Eccles, GCB, KCVO, CBE (20 June 1898 – 1 March 1966) was a Royal Navy officer who served as Commander-in-Chief, Home Fleet from 1955 until his retirement in 1958.

== Naval career ==
Eccles joined the Royal Navy in 1916 during the First World War. He also served in the Second World War as Captain of HMS Durban on the China Station.

Eccles then became Commander of the Royal Navy Barracks at Chatham in 1948. He was appointed Flag Officer commanding the Australian Fleet in 1949 and Admiral commanding the Reserves in 1952. He went on to be Flag Officer Air (Home) in 1953 and Commander-in-Chief, Home Fleet and NATO Allied Commander-in-Chief Eastern Fleet in 1955 before retiring in 1958.

Military offices
| Preceded by Sir Michael Denny | Commander in Chief, Home Fleet; 1955–1958 | Succeeded by Sir William Davis |
| Preceded by Harold Farncomb as Rear Admiral Commanding HM Australian Squadron | Flag Officer Commanding HM Australian Fleet; 1951–1953 | Succeeded by John Eaton |
