= Richard Lane-Poole =

Vice-Admiral Sir Richard Lane-Poole KBE CB
- Born: Richard Hayden Owen Lane-Poole; 1 April 1883
- Died: 25 March 1971 (aged 87)
- Military career
- Allegiance: United Kingdom
- Branch: Royal Navy
- Service years: 1898–1939; 1939–1944
- Rank: Vice-Admiral
- Commands: HM Australian Squadron (1936–38); Royal Naval College, Greenwich (1929–31); Royal Australian Naval College (1924–27)
- Conflicts: First World War; Second World War
- Awards: Knight Commander of the Order of the British Empire; Companion of the Order of the Bath

Vice-Admiral Sir Richard Hayden Owen Lane-Poole, KBE, CB (1 April 1883 – 25 March 1971) was a senior officer in the Royal Navy. He was the Rear Admiral Commanding His Majesty's Australian Squadron from 1936 to 1938.

== Naval career ==
Lane-Poole was born to Stanley Lane-Poole, an Egyptologist, and his wife Charlotte. His brother Charles was a forester who did much work in Australia. Educated at Bedford School, Lane-Poole joined the Royal Navy on 15 January 1898 as a Cadet. He was promoted to midshipman on 15 May 1899, sub-lieutenant on 15 June 1902, lieutenant on 15 September 1904, lieutenant commander on 15 September 1912 and commander on 30 June 1916. Between 1919 and 1920 he was stationed at the Mining School at Portsmouth. He was appointed Officer of the Order of the British Empire for valuable services to mine laying operations during the First World War.

He served aboard HMS Hood in 1922 and was promoted to captain on 30 June 1923. He served as the Captain of the Royal Australian Naval College at Jervis Bay, from April 1924 to April 1927. In 1929–31 he was captain of the Royal Navy College at Greenwich and later commanded the Royal Navy Barracks at Devonport. He was promoted to rear admiral on 8 May 1935 and was appointed to command His Majesty's Australian Squadron from 20 April 1936 to 21 April 1938. On 26 June 1936, he was appointed a Companion of the Order of the Bath. He was later promoted to vice admiral on 11 January 1939 and placed on the retired list.

During the Second World War he came out of retirement and served as commodore of convoys and director of demagnetization. On 1 January 1944, he was advanced to Knight Commander of the Order of the British Empire.

== Notes ==
Military offices
| Preceded by Rear Admiral Wilbraham Ford | Rear Admiral Commanding HM Australian Squadron; 1936–1938 | Succeeded by Rear Admiral Wilfred Custance |
