= HMAS Dechaineux =

1998 Collins-class submarine

- HMAS Dechaineux in Auckland Harbour, New Zealand. 3 November 2016

History

Australia
- Name: Dechaineux
- Namesake: Captain Emile Dechaineux
- Builder: Australian Submarine Corporation, Osborne
- Laid down: 4 March 1993
- Launched: 12 March 1998
- Commissioned: 23 February 2001
- Home port: Fleet Base West, Perth
- Motto: "Fearless and Ferocious"
- Status: Active as of 2016
- Badge

General characteristics
- Class & type: Collins-class submarine
- Displacement: 3,051 tonnes (surfaced); 3,353 tonnes (submerged)
- Length: 77.42 m (254.0 ft)
- Beam: 7.8 m (26 ft)
- Draught: 7 m (23 ft) at waterline
- Installed power: 3 × Garden Island-Hedemora HV V18b/15Ub (VB210) 18-cylinder diesel motors, 3 × Jeumont-Schneider generators (1,400 kW, 440-volt DC)
- Propulsion: Main: 1 × Jeumont-Schneider DC motor (7,200 shp), driving 1 × seven-bladed, 4.22 m (13.8 ft) diameter skewback propeller; Emergency: 1 × MacTaggart Scott DM 43006 retractable hydraulic motor
- Speed: 10.5 knots (19.4 km/h; 12.1 mph) (surfaced and snorkel depth); 21 knots (39 km/h; 24 mph) (submerged)
- Range: 11,000 nautical miles (20,000 km; 13,000 mi) at 10 knots (19 km/h; 12 mph) (surfaced); 9,000 nautical miles (17,000 km; 10,000 mi) at 10 knots (19 km/h; 12 mph) (snorkel); 32.6 nautical miles (60.4 km; 37.5 mi) at 21 knots (39 km/h; 24 mph) (submerged); 480 nautical miles (890 km; 550 mi) at 4 knots (7.4 km/h; 4.6 mph) (submerged)
- Endurance: 70 days
- Test depth: Over 180 m (590 ft) (actual depth classified)
- Complement: Originally 42 (plus up to 12 trainees); Increased to 58 in 2009
- Sensors & processing systems: Radar: GEC-Marconi Type 1007 surface search radar; Sonar: Thales Scylla bow and distributed sonar arrays; Thales Karriwarra or Namara towed sonar array; ArgoPhoenix AR-740-US intercept array; Combat system: Modified Raytheon CCS Mk2
- Armament: 6 × 21-inch (530 mm) bow torpedo tubes; Payload: 22 torpedoes, mix of: Mark 48 Mod 7 CBASS torpedoes; UGM-84C Sub-Harpoon anti-ship missiles; Or: 44 Stonefish Mark III mines
- Notes: The sonars and combat system are in the process of being updated across the class, to be completed by 2010. These characteristics represent the updated equipment.

HMAS Dechaineux (SSG 76) is the fourth of six Collins class submarines operated by the Royal Australian Navy (RAN).

Named for Captain Emile Dechaineux, the boat was laid down in 1993 and launched in 1998. Dechaineux and sister boat Sheean were modified during construction as part of the "fast track" program—an attempt to fix the problems affecting the Collins class, and put at least two fully operational submarines in service before the last Oberon-class submarine was decommissioned.

In 2003, a seawater pipe burst while Dechaineux was submerged deep, nearly resulting in the loss of the submarine.

== Design and construction ==
The Collins class is an enlarged version of the Västergötland-class submarine designed by Kockums. At 77.42 metres (254.0 ft) in length, with a beam of 7.8 metres (26 ft) and a waterline depth of 7 metres (23 ft), displacing 3,051 tonnes when surfaced, and 3,353 tonnes when submerged, they are the largest conventionally powered submarines in the world. The hull is constructed from high-tensile micro-alloy steel, and are covered in a skin of anechoic tiles to minimise detection by sonar. The depth that they can dive to is classified: most sources claim that it is over 180 metres (590 ft),

The submarine is armed with six 21-inch (530 mm) torpedo tubes, and carry a standard payload of 22 torpedoes: originally a mix of Gould Mark 48 Mod 4 torpedoes and UGM-84C Sub-Harpoon, with the Mark 48s later upgraded to the Mod 7 Common Broadband Advanced Sonar System (CBASS) version.

Each submarine is equipped with three Garden Island-Hedemora HV V18b/15Ub (VB210) 18-cylinder diesel engines, which are each connected to a 1,400 kW, 440-volt DC Jeumont-Schneider generator. The electricity generated is stored in batteries, then supplied to a single Jeumont-Schneider DC motor, which provides 5,400 kW (7,200 shaft horsepower) to a single, seven-bladed, 4.22-metre (13.8 ft) diameter skewback propeller. The Collins class has a speed of 10.5 knots (19.4 km/h; 12.1 mph) when surfaced or at snorkel depth, and can reach 21 knots (39 km/h; 24 mph) underwater. The submarines have a range of 11,000 nautical miles (20,000 km; 13,000 mi) at 10 knots (19 km/h; 12 mph) when surfaced, 9,000 nautical miles (17,000 km; 10,000 mi) at 10 knots (19 km/h; 12 mph) at snorkel depth. When submerged completely, a Collins-class submarine can travel 32.6 nautical miles (60.4 km; 37.5 mi) at maximum speed, or 480 nautical miles (890 km; 550 mi) at 4 knots (7.4 km/h; 4.6 mph). Each boat has an endurance of 70 days.

The issues with the Collins class highlighted in the McIntosh-Prescott Report and the pressing need to have combat-ready submarines in the RAN fleet with the pending decommissioning of Otama, the final Oberon-class submarine in Australian service, prompted the establishment of an A$1 billion program to bring Dechaineux and sister boat Sheean up to an operational standard as quickly as possible, referred to as the "fast track" or "get well" program. The fast track program required the installation of reliable diesel engines, fixing hydrodynamic noise issues by modifying the hull design and propeller, and providing a functional combat system. The original Rockwell International-designed combat system had been cancelled, but because there wasn't enough time to evaluate the replacement system to include it in the "fast track" program, the two submarines were fitted with components from the old Rockwell system, which were augmented by commercial off-the-shelf hardware and software. Even with the enhanced Rockwell system, it was believed that the capabilities of the fast track Collins boats was only equivalent to the Oberons.

Dechaineux was laid down by the Australian Submarine Corporation on 4 March 1993, launched on 12 March 1998, and commissioned into the RAN on 23 February 2001. Dechaineux was named for Captain Emile Dechaineux, who was killed by a kamikaze attack on 21 October 1944 while commanding HMAS Australia.

== Operational history ==
On 14 December 2000, Dechaineux and Sheean arrived at HMAS Stirling, following the completion of sea trials.

On 12 February 2003, Dechaineux was operating near her maximum safe diving depth off the coast of Western Australia when a seawater hose burst. The high-pressure seawater flooded the lower engine room before the hose was sealed off: it was estimated that if the inflow had continued for another twenty seconds, the weight of the water would have prevented Dechaineux from returning to the surface. The RAN recalled the Collins-class submarines to base after the incident, and after engineers were unable to determine the flaw in the pipes that caused the incident, instructed that the maximum safe depth of the class be reduced.

Dechaineux underwent a maintenance period during 2009 and early 2010; the submarine was returned to service in late May 2010.

On 9 November 2010, Dechaineux was damaged after a tugboat helping the submarine to manoeuvre from her berth at HMAS Stirling crossed over the submarine's stern. The submarine was sent to the Australian Marine Complex at Henderson, Western Australia for repairs: these were completed within a week, and Dechaineux was operational by late November.

During 2012, Dechaineux underwent an intermediate maintenance docking, assisted HMAS Warramunga during trials of the MU90 Impact torpedo, and participated in several training exercises.

== See also ==
- Major submarine incidents since 2000
