= Wilfred Custance =

Royal Navy admiral

Rear Admiral Wilfred Custance CB
- Born: 25 June 1884; South Kensington, England
- Died: 13 December 1939 (aged 55); At sea
- Military career
- Allegiance: United Kingdom
- Branch: Royal Navy
- Service years: 1899–1939
- Rank: Rear admiral
- Commands: HM Australian Squadron (1938–39); HMS Rodney (1934–35); Devonport Gunnery School (1932–34); HMS York (1929–31); HMS Castor (1928); HMS Yarmouth (1926–27)
- Conflicts: First World War; Second World War
- Awards: Companion of the Order of the Bath

Rear Admiral Wilfred Neville Custance CB (25 June 1884 – 13 December 1939) was a senior officer in the Royal Navy. He was the Rear Admiral Commanding HM Australian Squadron from April 1938 to September 1939.

== Naval career ==
Custance was born on 25 June 1884 in South Kensington, England, the eldest child of Henry Neville Custance and Alice Georgina, née Custance. His grandfather was Admiral Sir Reginald Custance.

He joined the Royal Navy on 15 January 1899 as a cadet. He was rated midshipman on 15 May 1900 and served aboard HMS Ocean. He was promoted to sub-lieutenant on 15 July 1903, and served aboard HMS Foam in the Mediterranean Station between 1904 and 1905. He served on HMS Venerable in 1905 and was promoted to lieutenant on 15 January 1905. He was the gunnery officer aboard HMS Vanguard between 1913 and 1917, and was having dinner aboard another ship at Scapa Flow in 1917 when HMS Vanguard suffered an internal explosion and sank with the loss of lives of 843 men. He served aboard HMS Vanguard during World War I and was present during the battle of Jutland in 1916.

Custance was promoted to captain in 1925 and went on to command HMS Yarmouth in 1926, HMS Castor in 1928 and HMS York in 1930. He commanded the Devonport Gunnery School between 1932 and 1934, and HMS Rodney of the 2nd Battle Squadron of Home Fleet between 1934 and 1936. He was appointed aide-de-camp to King George V in 1935. He was promoted to rear admiral in 1936, and commanded the Naval Brigade formed for ceremonial duties during the coronation of King George VI on 12 May 1937. He was appointed rear admiral commanding HM Australian Squadron on 22 April 1938. However, due to ill health, he was forced to relinquish the command on 2 September 1939.

While returning to England he died aboard ship and was buried at sea off Aden. He was survived by his wife, Winifred Olive Cave—whom he married on 18 February 1911—and their three children, Hambleton, Rosemary and Peter. He is commemorated on the Commonwealth War Graves Commission's Portsmouth Naval Memorial.

== Citations ==
Military offices
Preceded by Rear Admiral Richard Lane-Poole	Rear Admiral Commanding HM Australian Squadron; 1937–1939	Succeeded by Rear Admiral Wilfrid Patterson
