= HMAS Stalwart (H14) =

1918 S-class destroyer

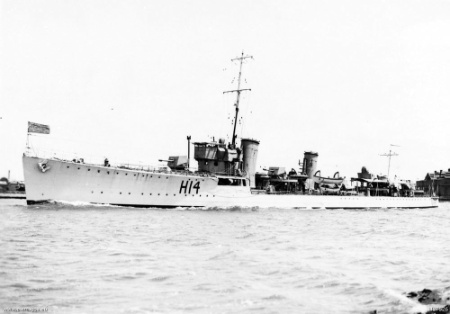
- HMAS Stalwart (H14)

History

Australia
- Builder: Swan Hunter & Wigham Richardson Limited
- Laid down: April 1918
- Launched: 23 October 1918
- Completed: 5 April 1919
- Commissioned: Royal Navy: April 1919; RAN: 27 January 1920
- Decommissioned: 1 December 1925
- Motto: Cor Roboris Cona Fors; "The Heart of Strength is Good Fortune"
- Fate: Sold for scrap, 1937

General characteristics
- Class & type: Admiralty S-class destroyer
- Displacement: 1,075 tons
- Length: 276 ft 1.75 in (84.1693 m) length overall; 265 ft (81 m) between perpendiculars
- Beam: 26 ft 8.25 in (8.1344 m)
- Propulsion: 3 × Yarrow boilers, Brown-Curtis turbines, 27,000 shp (20,000 kW), 2 shafts
- Speed: 36 knots (67 km/h; 41 mph) as designed; 32.7 knots (60.6 km/h; 37.6 mph) on power trails; 13 knots (24 km/h; 15 mph) economical
- Range: 2,608 nautical miles (4,830 km; 3,001 mi) at 13 knots (24 km/h; 15 mph)
- Complement: 6 officers, 93 sailors
- Armament: 3 × QF 4-inch Mk IV guns; 1 × 2-pounder pom-pom; 5 × .303-inch machine guns; 2 × twin 21-inch torpedo tube sets; 2 depth charge throwers; 2 depth charge chutes

HMAS Stalwart (H14) was an Admiralty S-class destroyer of the Royal Australian Navy (RAN). Built for the Royal Navy during World War I, the ship was not completed until 1919 and spent less than eight months in British service before being transferred to the RAN at the start of 1920. The destroyer's career was uneventful, with almost all of it spent operating along the east coast of Australia. Stalwart was decommissioned at the end of 1925, sold for ship breaking in 1937, and scuttled in 1939.

== Design and construction ==
Stalwart was built to the Admiralty design of the S-class destroyer, which was designed and built as part of the British emergency war programme. The destroyer had a displacement of 1,075 tons, a length of 276 feet 1.75 inches (84.1693 m) overall and 265 feet (81 m) between perpendiculars, and a beam of 26 feet 8.25 inches (8.1344 m). The propulsion machinery consisted of three Yarrow boilers feeding Brown-Curtis turbines, which supplied 27,000 shaft horsepower (20,000 kW) to the ship's two propeller shafts. Although designed with a maximum speed of 36 knots (67 km/h; 41 mph), Stalwart was only able to achieve 32.7 knots (60.6 km/h; 37.6 mph) on power trials. The destroyer's economical speed of 13 knots (24 km/h; 15 mph) gave her a range of 2,608 nautical miles (4,830 km; 3,001 mi). The ship's company was made up of 6 officers and 93 sailors.

The destroyer's primary armament consisted of three QF 4-inch Mark IV guns. These were supplemented by a 2-pounder pom-pom, five .303 inch machine guns (a mix of Lewis and Maxim guns), two twin 21-inch torpedo tube sets, two depth charge throwers, and two depth charge chutes.

Stalwart was laid down by Swan Hunter & Wigham Richardson Limited at their Wallsend-on-Tyne shipyard in April 1918. The destroyer was launched on 23 October 1918, and completed on 5 April 1919. The ship was briefly commissioned into the Royal Navy in April 1919, but was quickly marked for transfer to the RAN, along with four sister ships. Stalwart was commissioned into the RAN on 27 January 1920. There were plans to rename the destroyer HMAS Darwin, but these were cancelled in mid 1920. The ship's badge depicted an acorn, and Stalwart carried the motto "Cor Roboris Bona Fors"; Latin for "The Heart of Strength is Good Fortune".

== Operational history ==
Although the other four S class ships sailed on 20 February, Stuart remained in England for another six days, and sailed with the destroyer leader HMAS Anzac. Stalwart spent most of her career operating within the Australia Station, primarily along the east coast of the continent.

== Decommissioning and fate ==
Stalwart was paid off to reserve on 1 December 1925. The ship was sold to Penguins Limited for ship breaking on 4 June 1937. The ship was stripped of useful materials, and the remaining hulk was sunk at 33°59.906′S 151°36.067′E on 22 July 1939. The ship had been loaded with a cargo of condemned onions before sinking: currents removed many onions from the wreck and caused them to wash up on beaches around Bondi. The ship's mast was removed before the ship's sinking, and is preserved inside the Royal Australian Navy Heritage Centre.
