= Emile Dechaineux =

Royal Australian Navy officer (1902–1944)

Emile Frank Verlaine Dechaineux
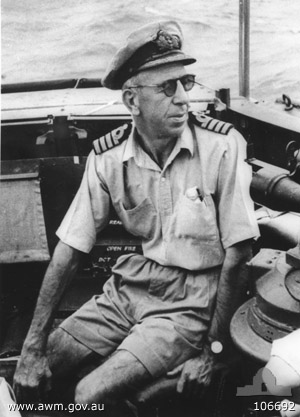
- Dechaineux c. 1943
- Born: 3 October 1902; Launceston, Tasmania, Australia
- Died: 21 October 1944 (aged 42); HMAS Australia, Leyte Gulf
- Burial place: Leyte Gulf
- Military career
- Allegiance: Australia
- Branch: Royal Australian Navy
- Service years: 1919–1944
- Rank: Captain
- Commands: HMAS Warramunga; HMAS Australia
- Awards: Distinguished Service Cross; Officer of the Legion of Merit (U.S.)

Emile Frank Verlaine Dechaineux, DSC (3 October 1902 – 21 October 1944) was an Australian mariner who reached the rank of captain in the Royal Australian Navy during World War II. He was killed by a Japanese aircraft in what is believed to have been the first ever kamikaze attack, in the lead-up to the Battle of Leyte Gulf.

== Biography ==
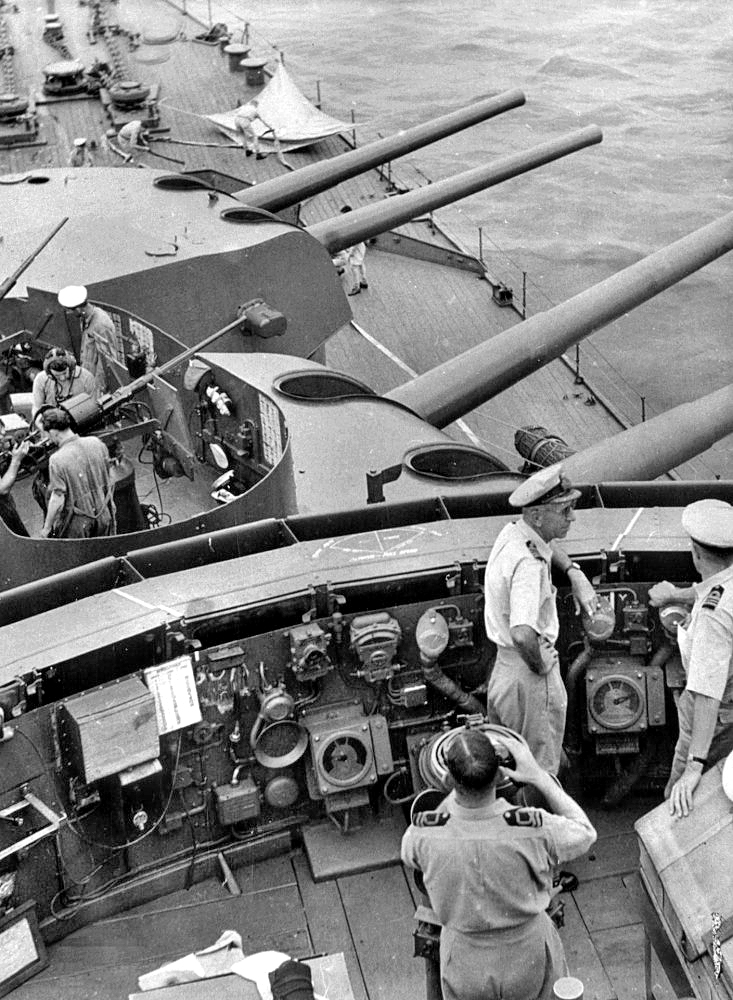
Dechaineux (second right) on the bridge of HMAS Australia in September 1944.

Dechaineux was born in Launceston, Tasmania, to a Belgian-born father, Florent Dechaineux, and an Australian mother. He entered the Royal Australian Naval College, Jervis Bay at the age of 14, graduated three years later, and was promoted to midshipman in 1920. In the first half of the 20th century, the RAN worked very closely with the British Royal Navy (RN), frequently exchanging personnel. Dechaineux spent much of the 1920s training with the RN as a torpedo officer and naval air observer.

In September 1932 Dechaineux achieved the rank of Lieutenant Commander. In 1935 he was appointed Squadron Torpedo Officer, on board HMAS Canberra. The following year he married Mary Harbottle. In 1937, Dechaineux returned to the UK to attend the Royal Naval College and on 30 June he was promoted to commander.

At the outbreak of World War II, Dechaineux was attached to the RN Tactical and Minesweeping divisions until April 1940. Then, as the commander of the destroyer HMS Vivacious, he made five trips to assist Operation Dynamo, the evacuation of Dunkirk.

On 26 May the ship was allocated to Dynamo. Deployed from Dover on 27 May, she initially patrolled the beaches off Dunkirk, providing general anti-aircraft cover and protecting against E-boat attacks while vessels evacuated across the Channel. However, the Vivacious could not match the attacking enemy aircraft and ship with her machine guns; she was bombed as she reached the open sea, and 40 on board were killed.

The next day the destroyer made two trips from Dunkirk to Dover, bringing out 326 men in the first trip and 359 in the second; one can only imagine the crowding of every interior space and her weather deck by so many men. Two days later another 537 men were safely landed in the British port. On 31 May the vessel came under fire from shore batteries off Bray and sustained 15 casualties. Dechaineux received a minor wound to his forehead and a piece of shrapnel tore the back of his trousers In a letter to his wife he remarked "I am very grateful that the ship was heading away from the gunfire, rather than towards it!” On 1 June another 427 men were brought back to Dover.

On 3 June the destroyer was directed to take part in Operation OK, which sank blockships, to provide a temporary wharfage point, in Dunkirk Harbour. Vivacious safely brought the crews of these ships back across the Channel. Altogether the destroyer brought out a total of 1,649 passengers from Dunkirk during five voyages. The evacuation lasted nine days, and safely brought hundreds of thousands of men back to Britain. Four years later, many would return for the D-Day landings. Dechaineux had proved his worth during his baptism of fire, not only by commanding the ship through battle, but also through the effective leadership of his men. He was destined for greater things.

On 25 September 1940 he was given command of the brand new Hunt-class escort destroyer, HMS Eglington. After working up to satisfactory operational capability in Scapa Flow — where the ship and her captain were assessed by RN experts — the last months of the year were spent on North Sea convoy escort duties, as was 1941, although on 4 October the ship carried out a brief search for a German destroyer reported minelaying off South Foreland.

In 1941, he was awarded the Distinguished Service Cross.

Dechaineux returned to Australia later in 1941, as director of operations at the Navy Office in Melbourne. In June 1943, following the outbreak of war with Japan, he was given command of the tactical (destroyer) component of RAN-US Navy Task Force 74. From his immediate command, HMAS Warramunga, Dechaineux commanded operations in waters around Australia and New Guinea, including support for amphibious landings, such as those in the Admiralty Islands. He was promoted to captain on 31 December 1943.

On 9 March 1944, Dechaineux was given command of the heavy cruiser HMAS Australia, the flagship of both the RAN and Task Force 74, under the overall force commander Commodore John Collins. The Australia supported Allied landings at Hollandia in Dutch New Guinea and on the islands of Biak, Noemfoor and Morotai.

On 21 October 1944, HMAS Australia was supporting the landings in Leyte Gulf. Off Leyte Island, gunners from HMAS Australia and HMAS Shropshire fired at and hit a Japanese aircraft. Initially, the plane flew away from the ships, but it subsequently turned and dived into Australia. The plane struck the superstructure of the Australia above the bridge. Although the 200 kg (440 pound) bomb carried by the plane failed to explode, burning fuel and debris were spewed over a large area. Dechaineux was disembowelled by shrapnel and died a few hours later. He was buried at sea that night. Another 30 crew members died as a result of the attack; among the wounded was Commodore Collins.

The US government posthumously appointed Dechaineux an Officer of the Legion of Merit.

In 1990 the Australian government announced that a new Collins-class submarine would be named HMAS Dechaineux in his memory. It was launched in 1998 in the presence of Dechaineux's widow, Mary Purbrick, and his son, former RAN Commodore Peter Dechaineux.

== Honours and awards ==
Captain Emile Dechaineux was decorated with the following honours:

Distinguished Service Cross (DSC)	(1941)
1939-1945 Star	
Atlantic Star	
Pacific Star	
War Medal 1939–1945 with Bronze Oakleaf for Mentioned in Dispatches	
Australia Service Medal 1939-45	
Officer of the US Legion of Merit	(1944)
