= Leonard Holbrook =

Rear-Admiral Leonard Holbrook MVO
- Born: 1 January 1882
- Died: 29 August 1974 (aged 92)
- Relatives: Norman Douglas Holbrook (brother)
- Military career
- Allegiance: United Kingdom
- Branch: Royal Navy
- Service years: 1896–1932; 1942–1945
- Rank: Rear-Admiral
- Commands: HMS St Vincent (1942–45); HM Australian Squadron (1931–32); HMAS Canberra (1929–31); HMS Birmingham (1928–29); HMS Cleopatra (1928–29); HMS Calliope (1927–28); HMS Curlew (1922–24)
- Conflicts: First World War
- Awards: Member of the Royal Victorian Order

Rear-Admiral Leonard Stanley Holbrook MVO (1 January 1882 – 29 August 1974) was a senior officer in the Royal Navy. He was the Commodore Commanding His Majesty's Australian Squadron from 29 May 1931 to 7 April 1932.

== Early life and family ==
Holbrook was born at Portsmouth on 1 January 1882, the second son of Arthur Holbrook and his wife Amelia Mary (née Parks). Arthur Holbrook was the owner of the Portsmouth Times, and also a keen member of the Volunteer Force, forerunner of the later Territorial Army. Arthur was later knighted for his service as a colonel in the Army Service Corps, during the First World War, and became Member of Parliament for Basingstoke in 1920. He and his wife had six sons and four daughters, and of these Leonard's brother Norman achieved fame as the first Royal Navy recipient of the Victoria Cross during the First World War.

== Naval career ==
Holbrook joined the Royal Navy in 1896. He was rated midshipman on 15 January 1898. While serving on HMS Majestic he formed part of the honour guard for the state funeral of Queen Victoria, and was appointed a Member of the Royal Victorian Order on 19 March 1901. He was promoted to acting sub-lieutenant on 15 July 1901 and subsequently confirmed in that rank from the same date, then to lieutenant on 15 January 1902. In November 1902 he was posted to the armoured cruiser HMS Sutlej, serving in the Channel Squadron. He served aboard HMS Exmouth as part of the Atlantic Fleet in 1908 and was promoted to lieutenant commander in 1910.

At the start of the First World War, Holbrook was serving as a gunnery officer aboard HMS Devonshire. He was promoted commander on 31 December 1914, and then served successively as Flag Commander to Vice Admirals Sir Martyn Jerram, Sir Herbert Heath and Sir Dudley de Chair in the Grand Fleet.

He was promoted captain on 30 June 1920. He married a widow, Gladys Nina Grove, on 1 January 1920, she had a son called Richard by her earlier marriage. He commanded HMS Curlew from 1922 to 1924. He was seconded to the Royal Australian Navy in 1929, initially commanding HMAS Canberra, then he was appointed Commodore First Class to command His Majesty's Australian Squadron between 29 May 1931 and 7 April 1932. He was appointed an Aide de Camp to King George V until 5 July 1932 and appointed again on 15 October 1932. He was promoted to rear admiral on 15 October 1932 and placed upon the retired list on 16 October 1932.

He died at home on 29 August 1974, and his funeral was at Bury, West Sussex on 6 September, followed by a cremation. His wife had predeceased him, he was survived by their son Robert, and her son Richard.

== Notes ==
Military offices
| Preceded by Rear Admiral Edward Evans | Rear Admiral Commanding HM Australian Squadron; 1931–1932 | Succeeded by Rear Admiral Wilbraham Ford |
