= Wilbraham Ford =

Royal Navy Admiral (1880–1964)

Admiral Sir Wilbraham Ford KCB KBE OStJ
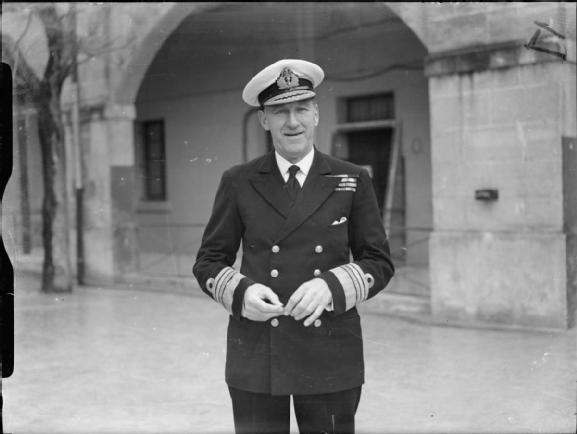
- Admiral Sir Wilbraham Ford in 1943
- Born: Wilbraham Tennyson Randle Ford; 19 January 1880; Saint Helier, Jersey, Channel Islands
- Died: 16 January 1964 (aged 83)
- Military career
- Allegiance: United Kingdom
- Branch: Royal Navy
- Service years: 1894–1946
- Rank: Admiral
- Commands: Commander-in-Chief, Rosyth (1942–1944); Flag Officer, Malta (1937–1941); HM Australian Squadron (1934–1936); HMS Dryad (1930–1932); HMS Royal Oak (1929–1930); HMS Ganges (1927–1928); HMS Calliope (1924–1925); HMS Diligence (1922–1923)
- Conflicts: First World War; Second World War
- Awards: Knight Commander of the Order of the Bath; Knight Commander of the Order of the British Empire; Officer of the Venerable Order of Saint John

Admiral Sir Wilbraham Tennyson Randle Ford, KCB, KBE, OStJ (19 January 1880 – 16 January 1964), was a senior officer in the Royal Navy. He was the Rear Admiral Commanding His Majesty's Australian Squadron from April 1934 to April 1936.

== Naval career ==
Ford was born on 1 January 1880 in Saint Helier, Jersey, Channel Islands, the son of Major C. W. Randle Ford. He joined the Royal Navy as a cadet on 15 January 1894, was promoted to sub-lieutenant a couple of years later, and to lieutenant on 26 June 1902. Promoted to captain he commanded HMS Diligence between 1 September 1922 and August 1923 then HMS Calliope as part of the Atlantic Fleet between 23 October 1924 and January 1925. Assigned to the shore establishment HMS President on 29 March 1926 and became the Director of Physical Training and Sports between 5 April 1926 and May 1926. Later transferred as the commanding officer to the training establishment HMS Ganges, Shotley and the Captain-in-Charge of Harwich Docks between 2 May 1927 and June 1928.

He commanded HMS Royal Oak as part of the Mediterranean Squadron between 8 May 1929 and April 1930. He was promoted to commanding officer of HMS Dryad (Navigation School) between 20 June 1930 and January 1932. He was the Rear Admiral Commanding His Majesty's Australian Squadron between 19 April 1934 and 20 April 1936. He was awarded the Companion of the Order of the Bath on 4 June 1934. Between 26 January 1937 and December 1941 he was the Vice-Admiral-in-Charge, Malta and Admiral Superintendent Malta Dockyard with his flag in HMS St Angelo. He was awarded the Officer of the Venerable Order of Saint John on 21 June 1938, the Knight Commander of the Order of the British Empire on 11 July 1940 and the Knight Commander of the Order of the Bath on 1 January 1942. He was transferred as Commander-in-Chief, Rosyth with his flag in HMS Cochrane between 1 June 1942 and 1944. He retired from the Royal Navy in 1946.

Ġużè Ellul Mercer, in his war diary Mercer, Ġużé Ellul (1949). Taht in-Nar: Djarju ta' l-Ewwel Sena tal-Gwerra [Beneath the Flames: A diary of the first year of the war] (in Maltese). Klabb Kotba Maltin. ISBN 9789993274049. describes Wilbraham Ford as follows in the entry for 27 October 1940:

Sir Wilbraham T. Ford, who at the beginning of the war was Admiral Superintendent at the Dockyard, has now moved, together with many of his naval offices, to Lascaris. He is a big man, built like a bastion, always tirelessly on the go. And what's more, he is never grumpy or moody like most of the top brass around here. He wears khaki trousers and shirt, without ribbons, medals or epaulettes, and black shoes. To see him go by reminds one of an old-time constable on holiday. It's hard to believe he is one of the top three who will decide the fate of Malta and its people. From time to time he comes out of his office, which is close to where I work, lights up a cigarette, draws a hearty draft, and sets about teasing the janitors sweeping or otherwise working in the courtyard. I have seen him hide a broom or a bucket behind a door, and then act as if he has no idea where they went when a janitor comes looking for them. And after every prank, he bursts out laughing like a boy without a care in the world. Wherever one meets him, he is taking the mickey out of someone, repeating some silly phrase in Maltese, or teasing the menial workmen. He keeps his shirtsleeves rolled up, revealing a pair of heavily tattooed arms. He is as tough and strict with the English officers working under him as he is kind and gentle with the subordinates. It was terrifying once hearing him berate a Commander for some minor infringement – the poor officer could have died for shame. As long as England has people like Sir Wilbraham Ford in command, she may yet win a war which today, to me, appears lost.

He died on 16 January 1964.

== Notes ==
Military offices
Preceded by Robin Dalglish	Rear Admiral Commanding HM Australian Squadron; 1934–1936	Succeeded by Richard Lane-Poole
Preceded by Sir Wilfred French	Flag Officer, Malta; 1937–1941	Succeeded by Sir Ralph Leatham
Preceded by Sir Charles Ramsey	Commander-in-Chief, Rosyth; 1942–1944	Succeeded by Sir William Whitworth
