= Fleet Command (Australia) =

Single command for all naval functions within the Australian Defence Force

- Active: 1913–present
- Country: Australia
- Allegiance: Australian Defence Force
- Branch: Royal Australian Navy
- Garrison/HQ: HMAS Kuttabul, Sydney

Commanders
- Current commander: Rear Admiral Anita Williams

The Fleet Command is responsible for the command, operations, readiness, training and force generation of all ships, submarines, aircraft squadrons, diving teams, and shore establishments of the Royal Australian Navy. Fleet Command is headquartered at HMAS Kuttabul in Sydney, and is led by the Commander Australian Fleet (COMAUSFLT), also referred to as Fleet Commander Australia (FCAUST), which is a rear admiral (two-star) appointment.

The position of Commander Australian Fleet was established in 2007. The previous positions since 1913 were:

- Rear Admiral Commanding HM Australian Fleet (1913–1926),
- Rear Admiral Commanding HM Australian Squadron (1926–1949),
- Flag Officer Commanding HM Australian Fleet (1949–1988, regularly abbreviated as FOCAF), and
- Maritime Commander Australia (1988–2007 – MCAUST).^{(I)}

== History ==
Prior to 1913, all naval activities and forces in Australian waters were controlled by the British Royal Navy. In 1859, Australia Station was established as a separate command of the Royal Navy, responsible for all the waters around the Australian continent, in addition to the British and Australian colonial possessions in the South Pacific. It was at this stage that the forerunner of Commander Australian Fleet, Officer Commanding Imperial Squadron Australian Station, was created. Between the Federation of Australia and formation of the Commonwealth Naval Forces in 1901 to the year of 1913, the Royal Navy began a process of transferring all command responsibility in Australian waters over to the Australian Government, as well as replacing equipment and personnel with Australian variants. The Commonwealth Naval Forces were renamed to Royal Australian Navy in 1911. With the transfer complete in 1913, the position of Rear Admiral Commanding HM Australian Fleet was formed, with control over all naval combat operations and forces; the post was renamed Rear Admiral Commanding HM Australian Squadron in 1926. Despite this position being a command of the RAN, the majority of occupants were Royal Navy officers attached to, or on loan to, the RAN.

In 1949, Rear Admiral Commanding HM Australian Squadron was redesignated Flag Officer Commanding HM Australian Fleet. This was followed by a renaming to Maritime Commander Australia in 1988, and more recently to Commander Australian Fleet in 2007. Throughout its existence, the command has administered Australian naval forces as they have been deployed for duty in the First World War, Second World War, Malayan Emergency, Korean War, Indonesian Confrontation, Vietnam War, Operation Navy Help Darwin (1974–75), the Gulf War, War in Afghanistan and Iraq War, in addition to peacekeeping operations. The rank associated with this position today is rear admiral, however some of the earlier appointees held a different rank.

During the East Timor operations of 1999–2000, the then Maritime Commander Australia held the Task force designator Commander Task Force 627.

== Command and staff ==
The Fleet Command is led by the Commander Australian Fleet who has overall command of the Fleet and supported by the Director-General Maritime Operations and the Commodore Warfare who have delegated responsibilities for operational command and maritime warfare alongside the Chief of Joint Operations. The principal role of the Fleet Command is to "plan, prepare for, and conduct maritime operations for the protection and promotion of Australia's security and interests". With this directive, the operations carried out or planned by the Commander Australian Fleet or the delegated command staff fall into three distinct categories: defence of sovereign territory, protection of overseas trade and offshore resources, and contingencies.

=== Commander Australian Fleet ===
The Fleet Commander is the chief maritime and amphibious operations advisor to the Chief of Navy. The Chief of Navy delegates full command of ships, submarines, aircraft squadrons, diving teams and shore establishments of the Royal Australian Navy to the Fleet Commander. The Fleet Commander is also responsible for overseeing the training, readiness, maintenance, capabilities management and force generation of the Fleet.

The Fleet Commander delegates the management of naval bases and operational command of Fleet units to force commanders. The Fleet Commander delegates operational control of fleet units to the Director General Maritime Operations and tactical command to the Director General Maritime Operations, the Commodore Warfare, tactical warfare commander, or a task group commander. Unless the Chief of the Defence Force directs the Chief of Navy to assign specific forces to the Joint Operations Command for joint or multinational operations, the Fleet Commander retains control of fleet forces.

=== Director-General Maritime Operations ===
The Director-General Maritime Operations (DGMAROPS) is the deputy to the Fleet Commander located within the Headquarters Joint Operations Command. The Director-General Maritime Operations is responsible for providing advice on the preparedness and readiness of the Fleet Command and for the operational control and tactical command of delegated fleet force elements and all Royal Australian Navy units at sea and on "routine activities". The Director-General Maritime Operations is also the Navy Submarine Operating Authority and in charge of the Navy Activity Schedule.

The Director-General Maritime Operations also oversees the Maritime Operations Centre within the Headquarters Joint Operations Command. The Maritime Operations Centre is responsible for the coordination of all maritime operations of units of the Fleet Command outside of Joint Task Forces.

=== Commodore Flotillas ===
The Fleet Commander's seagoing subordinate is Commodore Flotillas (COMFLOT), a position established by that name, and previously known as Commodore Warfare (between 2011 and 2018). In 2018, the name was reverted to COMFLOT under the direction of Commander Australian Fleet. The Commodore Flotillas oversees the Australian Fleet Battle Staff and the Australian Maritime Warfare Centre and is responsible for maritime warfare capability management and force generation.

==== Australian Fleet Battle Staff ====
The Australian Fleet Battle Staff is the naval staff of the Royal Australian Navy responsible for the command of multinational maritime warfare task groups and the tactical maritime expertise advice to the Australian Defence Force. The Staff also provides sea control operational planning with input from Fleet Forces. Members of the Australian Fleet Battle Staff serve afloat or ashore during maritime operations.

==== Australian Maritime Warfare Centre ====
The Australian Maritime Warfare Centre develops maritime warfare policy and formulates joint doctrine and tactics for the Royal Australian Navy. The centre also provides operational analysis to the Defence Science and Technology Group and other analytical capabilities for the Commodore Warfare.

== Fleet Forces ==
The operational command of the Force Element Groups of the Fleet Command are delegated from the Fleet Commander to the respective force commanders. The force commanders are responsible for the policy development, administrative management, operational capability, and force generation of all units and personnel of their respective fleet force. The Director-General Maritime Operations will have operational control of the fleet forces when required for deployed operations.

=== Surface Force ===
The Commander Surface Force oversees the capability management of the destroyers, frigates, and support vessels of the Royal Australian Navy.

=== Submarine Force ===
The Commander Submarine Force is charged with the responsibility of the operations of the Royal Australian Navy Submarine Service alongside the Navy Strategic Command's Director-General Submarine Capability.

=== Fleet Air Arm ===
The Commander Fleet Air Arm is in charge of the operational management and airworthiness capabilities of Royal Australian Navy aviation.

=== Mine Warfare, Hydrographic and Patrol Forces ===
The Commander Mine Warfare, Clearance Diving, Hydrographic, Meteorological and Patrol Forces is responsible for the operational capability and logistical management of the mine warfare forces, patrol forces, Clearance Diving Branch, the Australian Hydrographic Service of the Royal Australian Navy.

=== Shore Force ===
The Commander Shore Force is responsible for the shore capabilities and naval facilities including the maintenance and upkeep of the infrastructure, properties and ports of the Royal Australian Navy in accordance with seaworthiness requirements. The Shore Force also provides naval policy input to the Defence Estate and Infrastructure Group on matters of preparedness and garrison support.

=== Information Warfare Force ===
The Commander Information Warfare Force is in charge of the information warfare, signals intelligence and imagery intelligence capabilities of the Royal Australian Navy. The Information Warfare Force was established in 2015 through the amalgamation of five Navy Imagery Units, the Navy Tactical Data Link Organisation, the Maritime Data Correlation Centre, the Maritime Intelligence Support Centre, the Directorate of Maritime Command, Control, Communications and Computers and Electronic Warfare, and the Fleet Information and Communications Technology Support Teams.

== List of Commanders Australian Fleet ==
The following list chronologically records those who have held the post of Commander Australian Fleet or its preceding positions. However, the position of Officers Commanding Imperial Squadron Australian Station (1859–1913) is not included in this list as it was administered as a command of the Royal Navy, and existed before the formation of the Royal Australian Navy. The official title of the commander at that period of time is listed immediately before the officers who held that role. The rank and honours are as at the completion of the commander's term.

Rank	Name	Postnominals	Service	Term began	Term ended
Rear Admiral Commanding HM Australian Fleet
Vice Admiral	Sir George Patey	KCMG, KCVO	RN	23 June 1913	22 September 1916
Rear Admiral	Sir William Pakenham	KCB, MVO	RN	23 September 1916	9 January 1917
Rear Admiral	Arthur Leveson	CB	RN	9 January 1917	3 September 1918
Rear Admiral	Sir Lionel Halsey	KCMG, CB	RN	4 September 1918	21 March 1919
Rear Admiral	John Dumaresq	CB, CVO	RN	22 March 1919	29 April 1922
Rear Admiral	Albert Addison	CMG	RN	30 April 1922	30 April 1924
Commodore	Thomas Wardle	DSO	RN	30 April 1924	30 April 1926
Rear Admiral Commanding HM Australian Squadron
Rear Admiral	George Hyde	CVO, CBE	RAN	30 April 1926	17 May 1929
Rear Admiral	Edward Evans	CB, DSO	RN	17 May 1929	29 May 1931
Commodore	Leonard Holbrook	MVO	RN	29 May 1931	7 April 1932
Rear Admiral	Robin Dalglish	CB	RN	7 April 1932	19 April 1934
Rear Admiral	Wilbraham Ford	CB	RN	19 April 1934	20 April 1936
Rear Admiral	Richard Lane-Poole	CB, OBE	RN	20 April 1936	21 April 1938
Rear Admiral	Wilfred Custance	CB	RN	22 April 1938	2 September 1939
Commodore	Wilfrid Patterson	CVO	RN	2 September 1939	1 November 1939
Rear Admiral	John Crace	CB	RN	1 November 1939	13 June 1942
Rear Admiral	Victor Crutchley	VC, DSC	RN	13 June 1942	13 June 1944
Commodore	John Collins	CB	RAN	13 June 1944	27 October 1944
Captain	Charles Nichols	MVO	RN	27 October 1944	9 December 1944
Commodore	Harold Farncomb	CB, DSO, MVO	RAN	9 December 1944	22 July 1945
Commodore	John Collins	CB	RAN	22 July 1945	9 November 1946
Rear Admiral	Harold Farncomb	CB, DSO, MVO	RAN	9 November 1946	5 October 1949
Flag Officer Commanding HM Australian Fleet (FOCAF)
Rear Admiral	John Eccles	CB, CBE	RN	5 October 1949	10 October 1951
Rear Admiral	John Eaton	CB, DSO, DSC	RN	10 October 1951	17 December 1953
Rear Admiral	Roy Dowling	CBE, DSO	RAN	17 December 1953	23 February 1955
Rear Admiral	Henry Burrell	CBE	RAN	28 February 1955	7 June 1956
Rear Admiral	David Harries	CBE	RAN	7 June 1956	7 January 1958
Rear Admiral	Henry Burrell	CB, CBE	RAN	7 January 1958	20 January 1959
Rear Admiral	Galfry Gatacre	DSO, DSC & Bar	RAN	20 January 1959	22 December 1959
Rear Admiral	Hastings Harrington	CB, CBE, DSO	RAN	22 December 1959	8 January 1962
Rear Admiral	Alan McNicoll	CBE, GM	RAN	8 January 1962	6 January 1964
Rear Admiral	Otto Becher	CBE, DSO, DSC & Bar	RAN	6 January 1964	10 January 1965
Rear Admiral	Thomas Morrison	CBE, DSC	RAN	10 January 1965	29 January 1966
Rear Admiral	Victor Smith	CBE, DSC	RAN	29 January 1966	20 January 1967
Rear Admiral	Richard Peek	OBE, DSC	RAN	20 January 1967	18 March 1968
Rear Admiral	Gordon Crabb	CBE, DSC	RAN	18 March 1968	6 January 1970
Rear Admiral	David Stevenson	CBE	RAN	6 January 1970	14 April 1971
Rear Admiral	William Dovers	CBE, DSC	RAN	14 April 1971	24 January 1972
Rear Admiral	David Stevenson	CBE	RAN	24 January 1972	1 April 1972
Rear Admiral	William Dovers	CBE, DSC	RAN	1 April 1972	23 January 1973
Rear Admiral	Anthony Synnot	CBE	RAN	23 January 1973	4 February 1974
Rear Admiral	David Wells	CBE	RAN	4 February 1974	17 November 1975
Rear Admiral	Geoffrey Gladstone	AO, DSC & Bar	RAN	17 November 1975	16 April 1977
Rear Admiral	Neil McDonald	AO	RAN	16 April 1977	8 May 1978
Rear Admiral	James Willis	AO	RAN	8 May 1978	12 April 1979
Rear Admiral	David Leach	CBE, LVO	RAN	12 April 1979	16 May 1980
Rear Admiral	Peter Doyle	AO, OBE	RAN	16 May 1980	1 June 1981
Rear Admiral	John Stevens		RAN	1 June 1981	16 March 1982
Rear Admiral	Michael Hudson		RAN	15 March 1982	21 October 1983
Rear Admiral	Geoffrey Woolrych	AO	RAN	21 October 1983	3 May 1985
Rear Admiral	Ian Knox	AO	RAN	3 May 1985	6 January 1987
Rear Admiral	Peter Sinclair	AO	RAN	6 January 1987	2 September 1988
Maritime Commander Australia (MCAUST)
Rear Admiral	Peter Sinclair	AO	RAN	2 September 1988	6 January 1989
Rear Admiral	Ian MacDougall		RAN	6 January 1989	9 July 1990
Rear Admiral	Ken Doolan	AO	RAN	9 July 1990	7 November 1991
Rear Admiral	Robert Walls	AO	RAN	7 November 1991	9 December 1993
Rear Admiral	Donald Chalmers	AO	RAN	7 December 1993	13 April 1995
Rear Admiral	Chris Oxenbould	AO	RAN	14 April 1995	11 February 1997
Rear Admiral	Chris Ritchie	AM	RAN	11 February 1997	17 May 1999
Rear Admiral	John Lord	AM	RAN	18 May 1999	12 July 2000
Rear Admiral	Geoffrey Smith	AM	RAN	12 July 2000	20 July 2002
Rear Admiral	Raydon Gates	CSM	RAN	20 July 2002	28 June 2004
Rear Admiral	Rowan Moffitt	AM	RAN	28 June 2004	4 July 2005
Rear Admiral	Davyd Thomas	AM, CSC	RAN	4 July 2005	1 February 2007
Commander Australian Fleet (COMAUSFLT)
Rear Admiral	Davyd Thomas	AM, CSC	RAN	1 February 2007	July 2007
Rear Admiral	Nigel Coates	AM	RAN	July 2007	8 October 2009
Rear Admiral	Steve Gilmore	AM, CSC	RAN	8 October 2009	21 December 2011
Rear Admiral	Tim Barrett	AO, CSC	RAN	22 December 2011	12 June 2014
Rear Admiral	Stuart Mayer	AO, CSC & Bar	RAN	12 June 2014	19 January 2018
Rear Admiral	Jonathan Mead	AO	RAN	19 January 2018	17 November 2020
Rear Admiral	Mark Hammond	AM	RAN	17 November 2020	28 June 2022
Rear Admiral	Jonathan Earley	CSC	RAN	28 June 2022	16 December 2022
Rear Admiral	Christopher Smith	AM, CSM	RAN	16 December 2022	28 August 2026
Rear Admiral	Anita Williams	CSC, CSM	RAN	28 August 2026	Incumbent

== Footnotes ==
^(I) "HM" (His/Her Majesty's) is not always included when referring to these titles.
