= HMAS Creswell =

Royal Australian Navy shore establishment

- Jervis Bay, Jervis Bay Territory in Australia
- Ship's badge of HMAS Creswell

Site information
- Owner: Department of Defence
- Operator: Royal Australian Navy (1914 – 1931); Royal Australian Navy (1967 – present)
- Open to the public: No
- Website: www.navy.gov.au/establishments/hmas-creswell

Location
- Coordinates: 35°07′32″S 150°42′28″E

Site history
- Built: 1915

Garrison information
- Current commander: Captain Joanne Haynes, RAN
- Occupants: Royal Australian Naval College; RAN School of Ship Survivability and Safety; Beecroft Weapons Range; Administrative support unit; Training Ship Jervis Bay

HMAS Creswell is a training facility of the Royal Australian Navy (RAN) that includes the Royal Australian Naval College (RANC) as well as the School of Survivability and Ship's Safety, Beecroft Weapons Range, and an administrative support department. The facility is located between Jervis Bay Village and Greenpatch, on the shores of Jervis Bay in the Jervis Bay Territory. The RANC has been the initial officer training establishment of the Royal Australian Navy since 1915.

As of January 2025, the Commanding Officer is Captain Joanne Haynes.

== History ==
While the college at Captain's Point in the Jervis Bay was built, the RANC was temporarily located at Osborne House, Geelong, which had been considered as a permanent location for the College.

Construction of the main college buildings was completed in 1915. The senior staff bungalows were designed by John Smith Murdoch, later the Chief Architect of the Commonwealth of Australia and designer of the Provisional Parliament House in Canberra.

The first intake consisted of 13-year old boys, who stayed at the college for four years. The first graduation parade took place on 12 December 1916, before the Governor-General, Sir Ronald Munro-Ferguson. The graduates were 23 members of the 1913 Entry, known as the Pioneer class. On graduation they were promoted to Midshipmen and joined the Grand Fleet, where they saw war service.

The RANC, then consisting of the first two entries of cadet midshipmen, moved to Jervis Bay on 10 February 1915. To reduce costs during the Great Depression, the RANC was moved to Flinders Naval Depot in 1930. To lessen overcrowding at the depot, the college moved back to Captain's Point in 1958. The establishment at Captain's Point was renamed HMAS Creswell in honour of Sir William Rooke Creswell, a former Lieutenant in the Royal Navy, who was an important colonial naval officer, was instrumental to the formation of an independent Australian navy, and served as the First Naval Member of the Naval Board from 1911 to 1919.

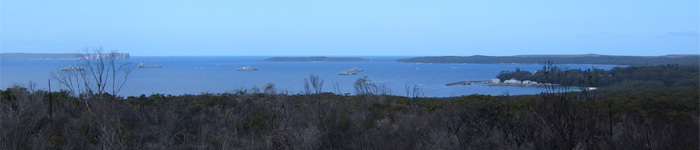
Royal Australian Navy vessels and HMAS Creswell.

== Royal Australian Naval College ==
The Royal Australian Naval College (RANC) at Creswell is the Australian authority for the basic and leadership training of officers for service in the Royal Australian Navy. The main course run by the College is the 15-week New Entry Officers' Course, which provides initial entry training for most of the RAN's officers. The RANC also conducts the residential component of the Reserve Entry Officers' Course. Further training for officers such as the Junior Officers' Leadership Course and the Junior Officers' Management and Staff Course also take place at the RANC; and there is the one-week residential Undergraduate Entry Officers' Course that provides junior officers who are undertaking university studies, to have a fundamental understanding of the Navy.

=== New Entry Officers' Course ===
The New Entry Officers' Course (NEOC) is undertaken by direct entry officers, graduate entry officers, and candidates who intend to proceed to the Australian Defence Force Academy (ADFA) to gain their degree. Generally, trainees who have no university education or a three-year degree enter the college as Midshipmen, whilst trainees with significant experience or more university education enter as Sub-Lieutenants, Lieutenants and Chaplains. Under the Naval Officer Year One (NOYO) scheme introduced in 2000, Midshipmen attending ADFA spend their first year on NEOC and, for Junior Warfare and Supply Officers, on initial phases of their respective application courses before progressing to the Academy.

After completing training at the College, officers proceed to other establishments for primary qualification training. Locations include HMAS Watson, for Junior Warfare Officers (formerly known as Seamen Officers), and Cerberus, for Electronics Engineer, Marine Engineer and Supply officers.

Subjects studied at NEOC include:

- Military training, including drill, discipline, command, wearing of the uniform, parade and ceremony
- Proficiency on the ADF's service firearm, the F88 Austeyr
- Physical training and fitness
- RAN History
- Survival at sea
- Sea combat survivability
- Naval weapons and technology
- Maritime studies including boatwork and basic seamanship
- Leadership and command studies
- RAN rank, organisational and operational structure

The course includes two periods of sea training:

- One week sea familiarisation course, where the basics of seamanship taught in the classroom are applied in practice
- Four week Sea Training Deployment, where the trainees become crew members of a Major Fleet Unit, and accompany the ship for whatever activities it is undertaking at the time

== Notable RANC graduates ==
- Rear Admiral Otto Becher CBE, DSO, DSC & Bar, RAN
- Captain Joseph Burnett RAN
- Vice Admiral Sir John Augustine Collins KBE, CB, RAN
- Captain Emile Frank Verlaine Dechaineux DSC, RAN
- Rear Admiral Harold B. Farncomb CB, DSO, MVO, RAN
- Rear Admiral Galfry Gatacre CBE, DSC, DSO & Bar, RAN
- Read Admiral Guy Griffiths AO, DSO, DSC, RAN
- Commodore Sir James Maxwell Ramsay KCMG, KCVO, CBE, DSC, RAN
- Lieutenant Commander Robert William "Oscar" Rankin RAN
- Captain Hector Waller DSO & Bar, RAN

== Other facilities ==
=== RAN School of Ship Survivability and Safety ===
The RAN School of Ship Survivability and Safety, colloquially known as the "school of many S's", is the primary CBRN and damage control training facility for the RAN in eastern Australia and is located about 3 km (1.9 mi) south of Creswell. Its facilities include two firefighting training units and a floodable mock-up of ships compartments, known as "Counter-Sink".

=== Beecroft Weapons Range ===
Beecroft Weapons Range, located on Beecroft Head, is a live fire range for conducting Naval Gunfire Support (NGS) exercises.

=== Training Ship Jervis Bay ===
The Australian Navy Cadet unit TS Jervis Bay operates from the western end of HMAS Creswell.

== See also ==
- List of Royal Australian Navy bases
