= Far East Fleet =

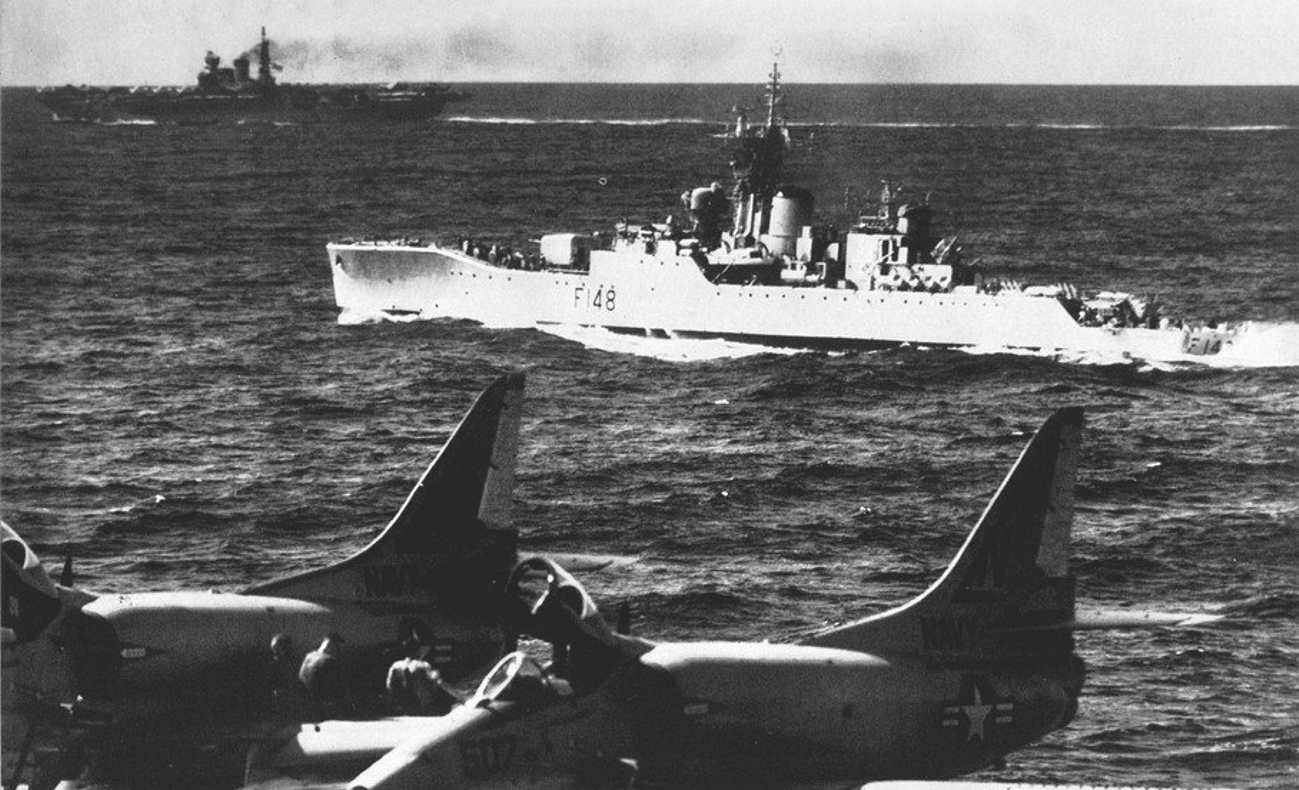
- Taranaki and Victorious underway during exercises in May 1964
- Active: 1952–1971
- Country: UK
- Branch: Royal Navy
- Type: Fleet
- Garrison/HQ: Singapore Naval Base
- Engagements: Malayan Emergency; Indonesia–Malaysia confrontation

The Far East Fleet (also called the Far East Station) was a fleet of the Royal Navy from 1952 to 1971.

During the Second World War, the Eastern Fleet included many ships and personnel from other navies, including the navies of the Netherlands, Australia, New Zealand, France and the United States. On 22 November 1944 the Eastern Fleet was re-designated East Indies fleet and continued to be based in Trincomalee. Following its re-designation its remaining ships formed the British Pacific Fleet. In December 1945 the British Pacific Fleet was disbanded and its forces were absorbed into the East Indies Fleet. In 1952 The East Indies Fleet was renamed the Far East Fleet. After the Second World War the East Indies Station continued as a separate command to the Far East until 1958. In 1971 the Far East Fleet was abolished and its remaining forces returned home, coming under the command of the new, unified, Commander-in-Chief Fleet.

== Post-war ==
After the war, the East Indies Fleet was once again based at the Singapore Naval Base. The 1st Aircraft Carrier Squadron (HMS Glory and HMS Theseus) arrived from the British Pacific Fleet in October 1945, and operated from Trincomalee, then Singapore, from October 1945 to October 1947. In 1952, the East Indies Fleet was redesignated the Far East Fleet. The Fleet then took part in the Malayan Emergency and the confrontation with Indonesia in the 1960s. By 1964, the fleet on station included Victorious, Centaur, Bulwark, Kent, Hampshire, 17 destroyers and frigates, about ten minesweepers and five submarines.

The Flag Officer Second-in-Command Far East Fleet, for most of the postwar period a rear admiral, was based afloat, and tasked with keeping the fleet "up to the mark operationally". Some also held the appointment of Flag Officer Commanding 5th Cruiser Squadron, probably including Rear Admiral E.G.A. Clifford CB, who was flying his flag in HMS Newcastle on 12 November 1953. Meanwhile, the fleet commander, a vice admiral, ran the fleet programme and major items of administration 'including all provision for docking and maintenance' from his base in Singapore.

In the last days of the East Indies Fleet North Korea invaded South Korea in June 1950, beginning the Korean War. William Andrewes was promoted to vice admiral on 1 December 1950, and on the 17th was made commander of the 5th Cruiser Squadron and Flag Officer Second in Command Far East Fleet, flying his flag in the light cruiser Belfast. After the outbreak of the Korean War he commanded British and Commonwealth Naval Forces, with the carrier Theseus as his flagship. He had two aircraft carriers available at any one time, which he worked in eighteen-day cycles. At times he also led Task Force 91 (comprising all Blockade, Covering Force and Escort ships in Korean waters, affiliated with the United Nations Command) in 1951.

From February 1963 the remaining destroyer and frigate squadrons in the Far East Fleet were gradually amalgamated into Escort Squadrons. All had been disbanded by the end of December 1966. Those in the Far East Fleet became the 1st, 2nd, and 3rd Far East Destroyer Squadrons. HMS Loch Fada (K390) returned to service in June 1962 assigned to the 3rd Frigate Squadron of the Far East Fleet. She arrived at Colombo in October and was deployed in the Indian Ocean, calling at Diego Garcia and Malé, Maldives. She served with the Far East Fleet until mid-1967 before returning home to be paid off.

In November 1967 fleet senior officers supervised the final departure from Britain's beleaguered State of Aden. Rear Admiral Edward Ashmore, Flag Officer, Second-in-Command, Far East Fleet, serving as Commander Task Force 318, commanded the British warships assembled to cover the withdrawal from Aden and receive the final Royal Marine Commandos heli-evacuated from the RAF Khormaksar airfield.

The fleet was disbanded in 1971, and on 31 October 1971, the last day of the validity of the Anglo-Malayan Defence Agreement, the last Commander, Far East Fleet, Rear Admiral Anthony Troup, hauled down his flag.

== Commander-in-Chief, Far East Fleet ==
Post holders included:

	Rank	Name	Term	Notes
Commander-in-Chief, Far East Fleet
1	Vice-Admiral	Sir Guy Russell	January 1952 – March 1953	
2	Vice-Admiral	Sir Charles Lambe	March 1953 – April 1955	
3	Vice-Admiral	Sir Alan Scott-Moncrieff	April 1955 – October 1957	
4	Vice-Admiral	Sir Gerald Gladstone	October 1957 – April 1960	
5	Vice-Admiral	Sir David Luce	April 1960 – November 1962	
6	Vice-Admiral	Sir Desmond Dreyer	November 1962 – January 1965	
7	Vice-Admiral	Sir Frank Twiss	January 1965 – June 1967	
8	Vice-Admiral	Sir William O'Brien	June 1967 -September 1969	
9	Vice-Admiral	Sir Derek Empson	September 1969 – April 1971	
10	Rear-Admiral	Sir Anthony Troup	April – November 1971	Rear-admiral as last commander.

== Flag Officer Second-in-Command Far East Fleet ==
Included:

	Rank	Name	Term	Notes
Flag Officer Second-in-Command Far East Fleet
1	Rear-Admiral	Laurence Durlacher	Appointed 1957.	Also Flag Officer Commanding Fifth Cruiser Squadron
2	Rear-Admiral	Varyl Begg	1958–1960	
3	Rear-Admiral	Michael Le Fanu	1960–1961	
4	Rear-Admiral	John Frewen	1961–1962	
5	Rear-Admiral	Jack Scatchard	1962–1964	
6	Rear-Admiral	Peter Hill-Norton	1964–1966	
7	Rear-Admiral	Charles Mills	1966–1967	
8	Rear-Admiral	Edward Ashmore	1967–1968	
9	Rear-Admiral	Anthony Griffin	1968–1969	
10	Rear-Admiral	Terence Lewin	1969–1970	
11	Rear-Admiral	David Williams	1970–1971	

== Chief of Staff, Far East Fleet ==
Included:

	Rank	Flag	Name	Term
Chief of Staff, Far East Fleet
1	Captain		Ralph L. Fisher	January – October 1952
2	Commodore		Laurence G. Durlacher	October 1952 – September 1954
3	Commodore		George A. F. Norfolk	September 1954 – October 1956
5	Commodore		Christopher H. Hutchinson	October 1956 – March 1959
6	Rear-Admiral	Rear-Admiral - Royal Navy	Ronald E. Portlock	March 1959 – April 1961
7	Rear-Admiral	Rear-Admiral - Royal Navy	Bryan C. Durant	April 1961 – July 1963
8	Rear-Admiral	Rear-Admiral - Royal Navy	Francis B. P. Brayne-Nicholls	July 1963 – July 1965
9	Rear-Admiral	Rear-Admiral - Royal Navy	Dennis H. Mason	July 1965 – December 1967
10	Rear-Admiral	Rear-Admiral - Royal Navy	Ian D. McLaughlan	December 1967 – February 1970
9	Rear-Admiral	Rear-Admiral - Royal Navy	John A. Templeton-Cotill	February 1970 – March 1971

== Flag Officer, Malayan Area ==
As the Malayan Emergency developed, the Flag Officer, Malayan Area's title changed as his areas of responsibility increased.

== Commodore, Amphibious Forces, Far East Fleet ==
Commodore, Amphibious Forces, Far East (COMAFFEF) was based at HMNB Singapore from May 1965 to March 1971.

The Amphibious Warfare Squadron was established in March 1961, which was responsible to the Senior Naval Officer, Persian Gulf until August 1962. It then was reassigned to Flag Officer, Middle East, until April 1965. The squadron was then transferred to the Far East where it was renamed Amphibious Forces under the new Commodore, Amphibious Forces, Far East Fleet in May 1965. The post was discontinued in March 1971.

Incumbents included:

	Rank	Flag	Name	Term
Commodore, Amphibious Forces, Far East Fleet
1	Commodore		Hardress L. Lloyd	May 1965 - May 1966
2	Commodore		David A. Dunbar-Nasmith	May 1966 - July 1967
3	Commodore		E. Gerard N. Mansfield	July 1967 - November 1968
4	Commodore		Thomas W. Stocker	November 1968 - September 1970
5	Commodore		Derek W. Napper	September 1970 - March 1971

== Commodore-in-Charge, Hong Kong ==
This officer was based at shore station HMS Tamar. He was responsible for administrating all naval establishments in Hong Kong including HMNB Hong Kong and, at times, exercised operational control over Royal Navy ships in that area.

== Subordinate naval formations ==
Units that served in the fleet included:

Naval Units	Based at	Date	Notes
5th Cruiser Squadron	Trincomalee then Singapore Naval Base	January 1942 – May 1960	
8th Destroyer Flotilla	Singapore	1947 to July 1951	re-designated 8th DSQ
1st Destroyer Squadron	Singapore	1950 to April 1960	
8th Destroyer Squadron	Singapore	July 1951 – May 1963	renamed 24th ESQ
1st Far East Destroyer Squadron	Singapore	December 1966 to 1 November 1971	
2nd Far East Destroyer Squadron	Singapore	December 1966 to 1 November 1971	
3rd Far East Destroyer Squadron	Singapore	December 1966 to December 1970	
1st Escort Flotilla	Singapore	1946 to 1954	
21st Escort Squadron	Singapore	May 1964 to December 1966	
22nd Escort Squadron	Singapore	May 1963 to June 1964	became 29th Escort Squadron
24th Escort Squadron	Singapore	May 1963 to December 1966	renamed from 8th DSQ
25th Escort Squadron	Singapore	January 1963 to May 1964	renamed from 6th FSQ
26th Escort Squadron	Singapore	May 1963 to December 1966	renamed from 3FSQ
29th Escort Squadron	Singapore	June 1964 to December 1966	
30th Escort Squadron	Singapore	September 1964 to December 1965	
3rd Frigate Squadron	Singapore	May 1949– 1954, January 1958 to May 1963	renamed 26th ESQ
4th Frigate Squadron	Singapore	January 1949 to August 1954	
4th Frigate Squadron	Singapore	January 1956 – December 1960	
4th Frigate Squadron	Singapore	September 1961 to September 1962	
5th Frigate Squadron	Singapore	December 1959 to December 1962	
6th Frigate Squadron	Singapore	December 1960 to September 1961; September 1962 to January 1963	Renamed 25th Escort Squadron
6th Mine Counter-Measures Squadron	Singapore	1962 to 1971	
8th Mine Counter-Measures Squadron	Hong Kong	1962 to 1967	
6th Minesweeper Flotilla	Singapore	August 1947 to 1951	placed in reserve
6th Minesweeper Squadron	Singapore	1951 to June 1954	new formation
104th Minesweeper Squadron	Singapore	1960 to 1962	
120th Minesweeper Squadron	Hong Kong Naval Base	1952 to 1962	
7th Submarine Division	Singapore	1959	
7th Submarine Squadron	Singapore	1966 to 1971	
Persian Gulf Division	Juffair Naval Base	January 1942 to January 1954	
Red Sea Division	Aden Naval Base	February 1942 to January 1954	

== See also ==
- South-East Asian Theatre of World War II
- Indian Ocean naval campaigns 1942–45
- List of Eastern Fleet ships
