= Medway School of Pharmacy =

Medway School of Pharmacy, Universities of Kent and Greenwich
- Type: Collaborated university centre
- Established: 2004
- Location: Medway, Kent, United Kingdom; 51.3973°N 0.5394°E
- Campus: Semi-rural
- Website: www.msp.ac.uk

The Medway School of Pharmacy is a school of pharmacy in South East England. Established in 2004, the school is the result of a collaboration between the University of Greenwich and the University of Kent. Its campus is part of a shared facility on Chatham Dockyard in Medway, Kent.

== History ==
Medway School of Pharmacy was established as a collaboration between the British universities of Kent and Greenwich, in response to a "shortage of qualified pharmacists" in the south east of England. The School admitted its first students after it received approval from the RPSGB. In September 2004: its first graduates completed Foundation degrees in June 2007 and in July 2008, the first cohort of MPharm students graduated from the school.

The campus was originally the home of the former Royal Naval Barracks, Chatham (also known as HMS Pembroke). In 1994, the University of Greenwich established a campus on the upper level, investing heavily over the next decade to improve and expand its facilities. In 2003, architects RMJM started work to create a shared campus which combines the historic nature of the site with contemporary architecture. In particular, the Grade II listed Drill Hall is now a learning resource center, incorporating a library with teaching space and ICT facilities.

Medway may be a location name, but it is actually an administrative area comprising the various towns as they are known locally, namely Chatham, Rochester, Gillingham and Strood and takes its name from the strategically placed river set halfway between London and the Channel ports.

== Organisation ==
The School's academic staff are grouped by subject, covering:

- Clinical and Professional Practice
- Chemistry and Drug Delivery
- Biological Sciences

The school offers the Master of Pharmacy (MPharm) undergraduate master's degree, a four-year programme which enables application for entry into pre-registration training leading to registration as a pharmacist. The school also runs short courses, undergraduate foundation and BSc degrees and postgraduate degrees. The school is offering a new BSc (Hons) Pharmacology and Physiology Programme, including integrated foundation year to launch in September 2015.

Appointed in August 2007, the Head of School is Professor Iain Cumming.

RESEARCH

Medway School of Pharmacy has over twenty academic research staff arranged in the three primary research groups that are listed above^.

Research Excellence Framework (REF) The school has over twenty academic research staff and a large number of research students.

"According to Times Higher Education (January 2015), this school's Research Intensity ranking was in the top 10% of submissions to Unit of Assessment 3, Allied health professions, Dentistry, Nursing and Pharmacy".

== Medway Pharmacy Students' Association ==
Established in January 2008, Medway Pharmacy Students' Association represents pharmacy students at Medway School of Pharmacy.

GK UNIONS

GK Unions stands for the Greenwich & Kent Students' Unions Together (previously Universities at Medway Students Association, UMSA). It is the representative body and service provider for all students studying at the Chatham Maritime campus. Students are automatically a member of the association if they are a registered student of the University of Greenwich or University of Kent.

== Campus ==
The School is based on the Universities at Medway campus, on the site of the former HMS Pembroke naval barracks at Chatham Dockyard. It benefits from the shared facilities at the campus. It is currently the biggest higher education initiative in the UK.

== Accommodation ==
Prior to Fall 2013, there was 6 student housing blocks which offered single en-suite or studio flats.

Starting in the 2014–2015 academic session, students pursuing a degree at the Medway School of Pharmacy have the choice of living either in halls of residence provided by the University of Greenwich or those provided by the University of Kent.

University of Greenwich at Medway Halls of Residence

Located on the Medway Campus itself, the accommodation consists of flats with shared kitchen/dining facilities for 4-6 students.

University of Kent at Medway Halls of Residence

This accommodation, which is owned and managed by Liberty Living, is arranged in clusters of flats for 5-8 students.
