= Gerald Gladstone (Royal Navy officer) =

Royal Navy Admiral (1901-1978)

Admiral Sir Gerald Gladstone
- Portrait by Walter Stoneman, 1957
- Born: 3 October 1901; Llandaff, Wales
- Died: 11 July 1978 (aged 76); Bridport, Dorset, England
- Military career
- Allegiance: United Kingdom
- Branch: Royal Navy
- Service years: 1915–1960
- Rank: Admiral
- Commands: Far East Fleet; 5th Cruiser Squadron; Royal Naval Barracks, Chatham; HMS Vanguard; HMS Black Prince; HMS Pelican
- Conflicts: First World War; Second World War
- Awards: Knight Grand Cross of the Order of the British Empire; Knight Commander of the Order of the Bath; Mentioned in Despatches

Admiral Sir Gerald Vaughan Gladstone GBE KCB (3 October 1901 – 11 July 1978) was a Royal Navy officer who served as Commander-in-Chief, Far East Fleet, from 1957 to 1960.

== Early years ==
Gladstone was educated at the Cathedral School, Llandaff, before joining the Royal Naval College, Osborne, on the Isle of Wight in May 1915.

== Naval career ==
Gladstone joined the Royal Navy in 1915. He served in the First World War aboard HMS Tiger.

Gladstone also served in the Second World War as executive officer on HMS Fiji and then, from 1941, as Commanding Officer of HMS Pelican on Atlantic convoy duties. He was made Assistant Director for Torpedoes and Mining Deputy at the Admiralty in 1942.

After the war, Gladstone was captain of HMS Black Prince and then Captain of the Fleet in the Mediterranean Fleet from 1947. He was given command of HMS Vanguard in 1949 and appointed Commander of the Royal Navy Barracks at Chatham in 1950. He became Vice Controller of the Royal Navy and Director of Naval Equipment in 1952 and second-in-command of the Far East Fleet and Flag Officer Commanding 5th Cruiser Squadron in 1953. He was appointed North Atlantic Treaty Organization Commander, Allied Naval Forces, Northern Europe in 1955 and Commander-in-Chief, Far East Fleet in 1957; he took part in Queensland's Centenary Celebrations in 1959.

Gladstone retired in 1960.

== Family ==
On 16 December 1925 at Brompton Oratory, London, Gladstone married Marjorie Cecilia Mary (Justine) Johnston, daughter of John Goring Johnston of New Zealand. They had two sons, John Nigel, William David and a daughter Mary Justine. Marjorie died in 1964.

In 1966, Gladstone married Dora Brown, née Stewart, his second wife. He predeceased his second wife, who died in December 2006.

Military offices
Preceded by Sir Alan Scott-Moncrieff	Commander-in-Chief, Far East Fleet; 1957–1960	Succeeded by Sir David Luce
