= Rama Thirunamachandran =

British university administrator (born 1966)

Rama Thirunamachandran OBE DL FRGS
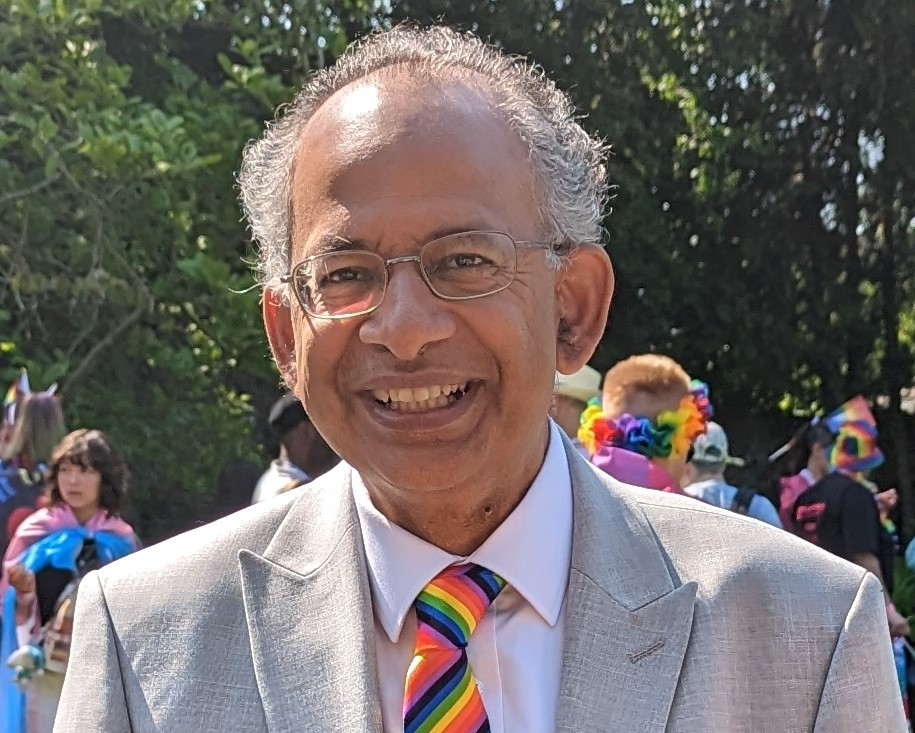
- Thirunamachandran in June 2023
- Born: September 1966 (age 59–60)
- Citizenship: British
- Education: Downing College, Cambridge
- Occupation: University administrator

Rama Shankaran Thirunamachandran (born September 1966) is a British university administrator and the former vice-chancellor of Canterbury Christ Church University. He was previously deputy vice-chancellor of Keele University and director for research, innovation and skills at the Higher Education Funding Council for England.

== Early life ==
Thirunamachandran was born in September 1966 in Britain. He is the son of theoretical chemist Thuraiappah Thirunamachandran, a Tamil from northern Ceylon. He studied at geography and natural sciences at Downing College, Cambridge, graduating in 1986.

== Career ==
Thirunamachandran worked on flood prevention projects in Bangladesh for the United Nations Development Programme. He held various posts at the University of Bristol and King's College London. He was head of research and enterprise at Royal Holloway, University of London and director of Royal Holloway Enterprise Limited. He was director for research, innovation and skills at the Higher Education Funding Council for England from 2002 to 2008.

Thirunamachandran was deputy vice-chancellor and provost of Keele University from 2008 to 2013. He became vice-chancellor and principal of Canterbury Christ Church University (CCCU) in October 2013, becoming the first British born Black, Asian and Minority Ethnic vice-chancellor of a mainstream UK university. In February 2025 it was announced that Thirunamachandran would retire from CCCU, and in April 2026 was succeeded by Claire Ozanne as vice-chancellor.

Thirunamachandran was chair of the Higher Education Academy (2015–2018) and a member of the board of UCAS (2010–2013). He has been on the board of Universities UK since 2017 and chair of MillionPlus (2020–2022) and he has been a non-executive director of Medway NHS Foundation Trust (2020-2024).

Thirunamachandran is a Fellow of the Royal Geographical Society. He was appointed a deputy lieutenant of Kent in November 2020. He was made an Officer of the Order of the British Empire for services to higher education in the 2023 Birthday Honours.
