= Bexley Tigers =

Basketball club in Bexley, London

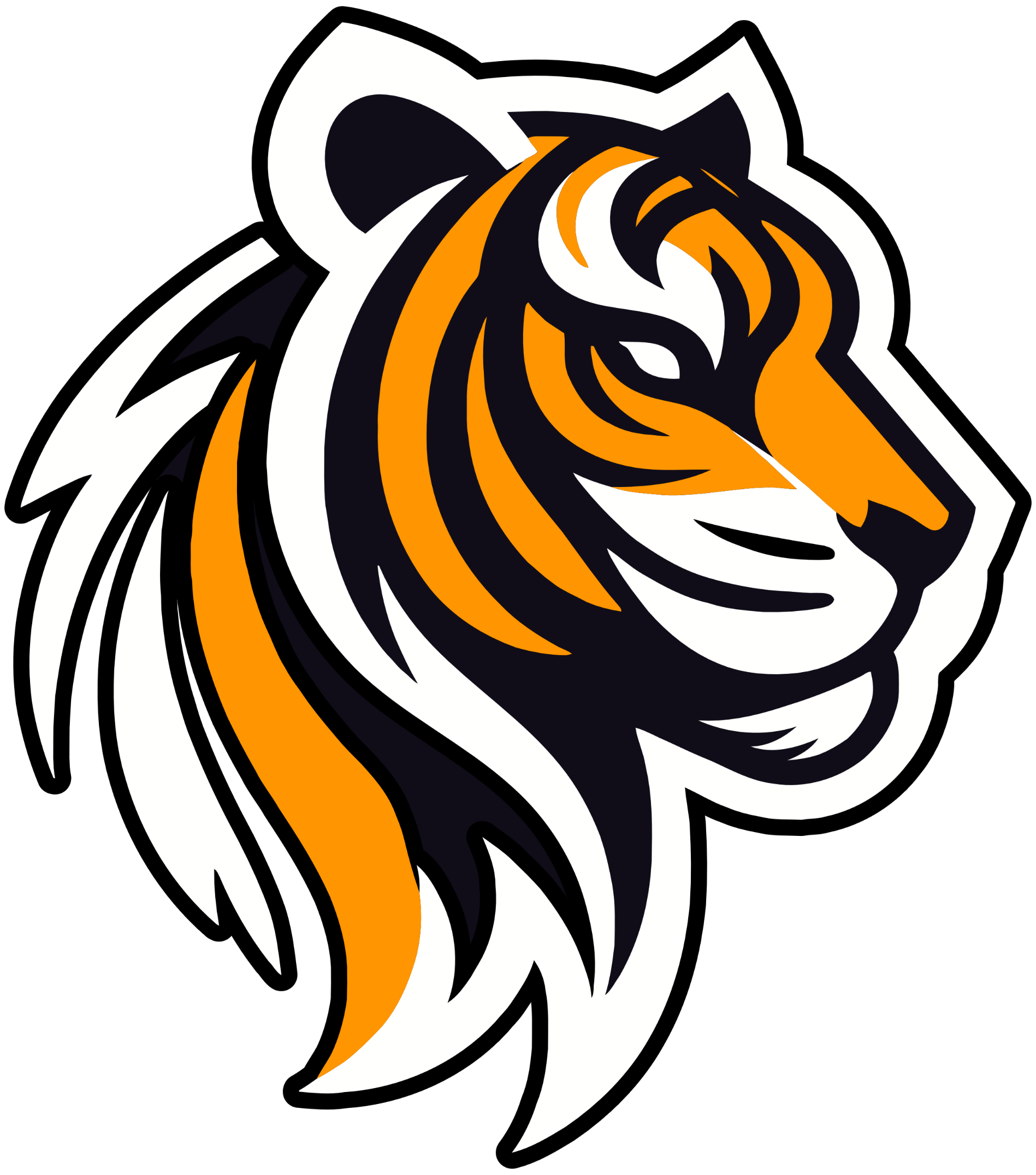
- Founded: 2021; 5 years ago
- History: 2021 – present
- Arena: Trinity CofE Belvedere
- Location: London Borough of Bexley
- Team colors: Orange, black, white
- Main sponsor: Timeline Athlete
- General manager: Sten Mayunga
- Ownership: Mayunga Enterprises
- Championships: 1 MBA 1st Division; 1 MBA 2nd Division; 1 MBA 3rd Division; 1 Nobby Crouch Plate
- Website: bexleytigers.co.uk
Home	Away	Third

Bexley Tigers is a British basketball club based in London Borough of Bexley. The club was originally founded in 2021 as the Kent Tigers, and changed its name in 2024 following a relaunch after stopping operations for 10 months. The club won back-to-back championships in the Medway Basketball Association.

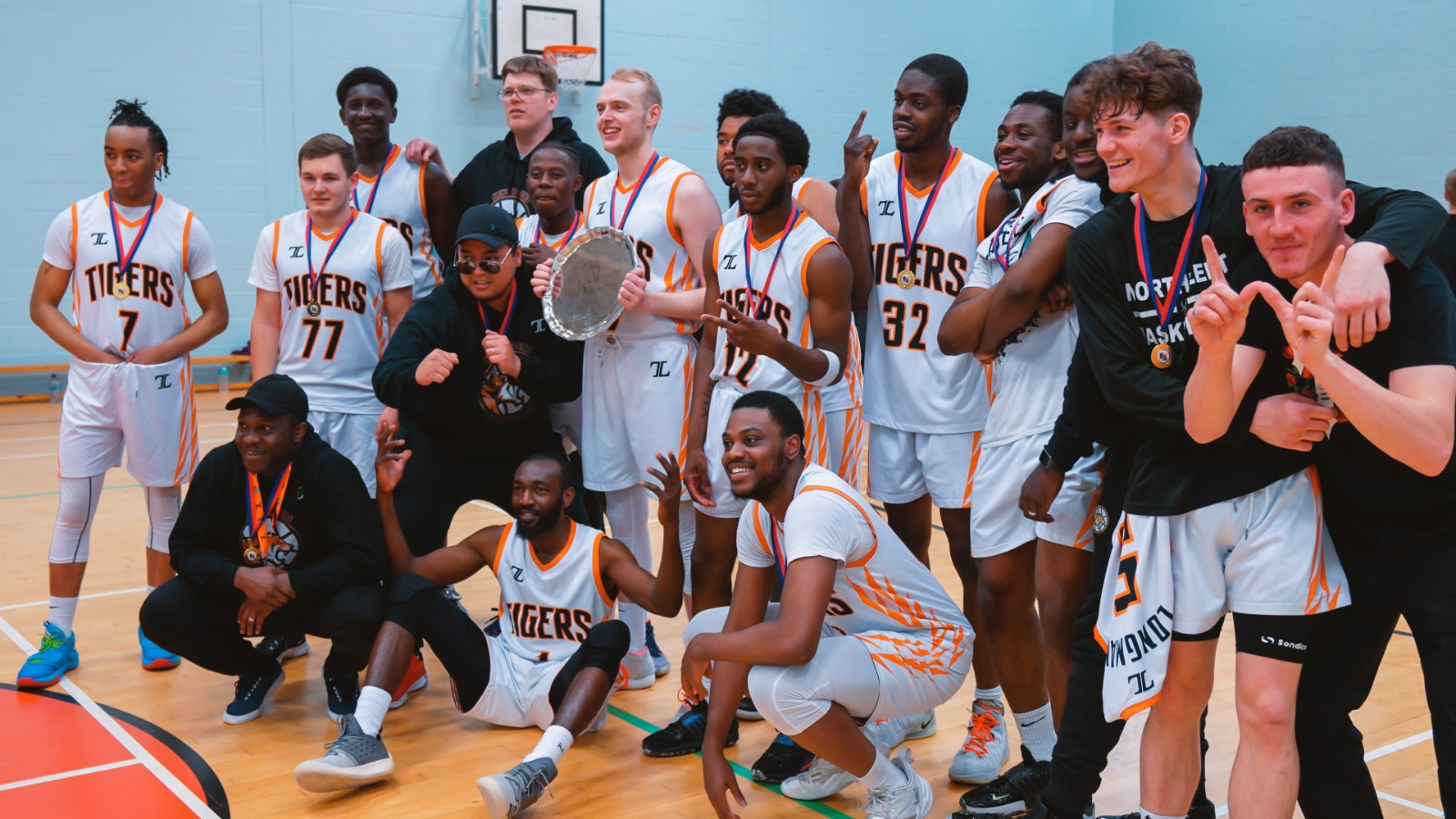
Kent Tigers winning the MBA Nobby Crouch Plate in 2022

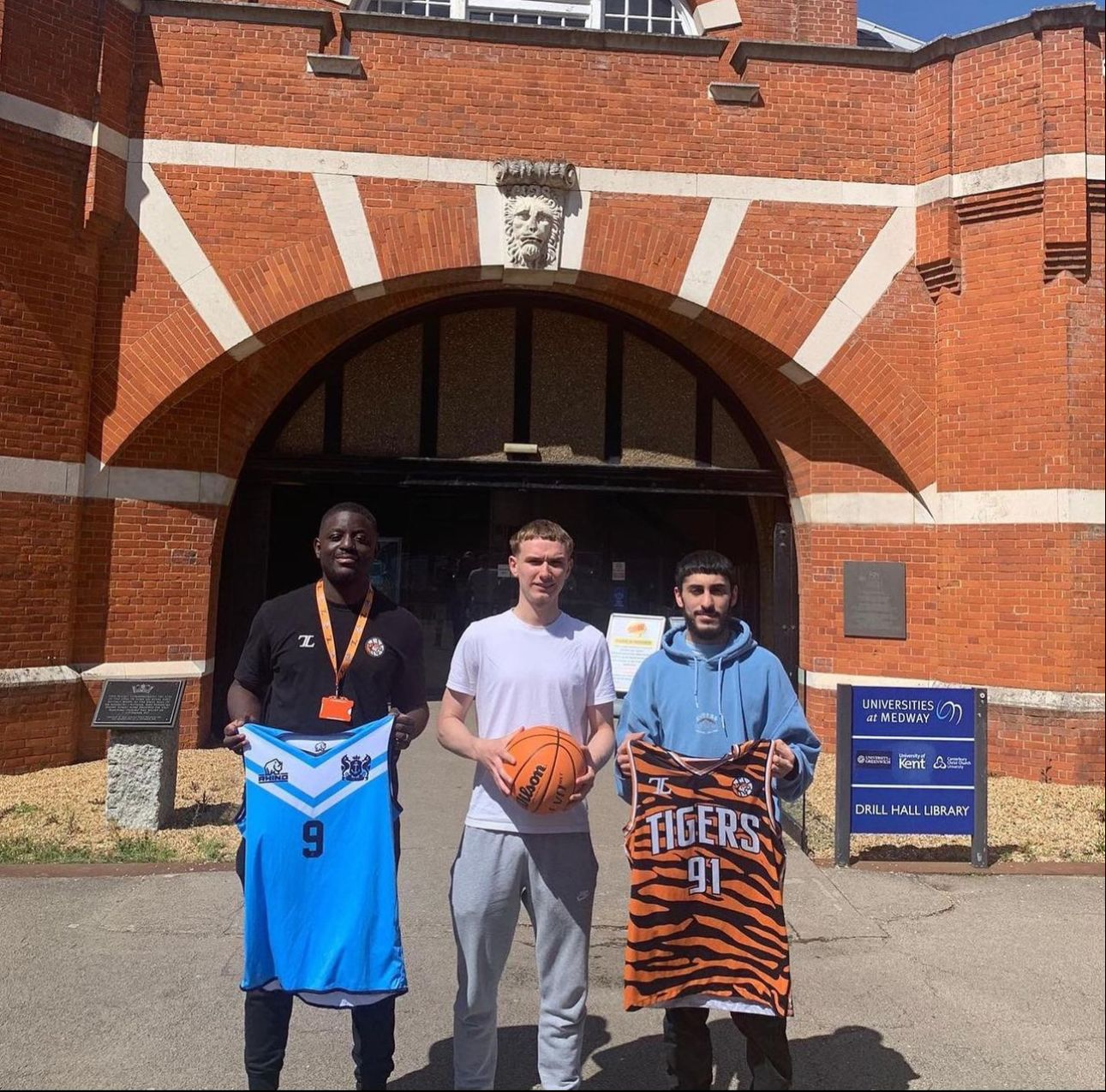
Team Medway basketball enter into partnership with Kent Tigers basketball club

== History ==
Bexley Tigers started in Division 3 of the local league.

In 2022, the club launched its juniors program. This program offers basketball training for boys and girls from under-12 to under-18 levels. The same year, Bexley Tigers entered into a partnership with the Universities at Medway. This collaboration aimed at taking control over the basketball program at the Medway University campus.

In its inaugural season, the Men's senior team went unbeaten in the League and won both the Medway Basketball Association D3 title and the Nobby Crouch Plate with a 93–41 win over Iroquois.

Bexley Tigers is led by General Manager Sten Mayunga. The club operates in Bexley and other areas within North West Kent. In addition, Bexley Tigers has formed a partnership with Little Hoopers, a basketball program designed for children as young as three years old.

=== Relaunching club operations ===
In early 2023, the Bexley Tigers Basketball Club temporarily suspended operations. This hiatus led to a significant development in the club's trajectory, culminating in the announcement of a relaunch scheduled for January, 2024.The club focuses particularly on youth development and community engagement.

Following the successful relaunch and in alignment with its renewed focus and expansion, the club underwent a significant rebranding. This rebranding reflects not only the club's geographical identity but also its commitment to serving and representing the Bexley community more explicitly.

Furthermore, the relaunch addressed the needs of older youth and adults. It included training and competitive opportunities for senior men's and women's teams, reflecting the club's aim to provide basketball development opportunities across all age groups and skill levels.

The club's initiatives were geared towards promoting values such as teamwork, discipline, and resilience among young players. Additionally, the relaunch included plans to enhance engagement with local schools and universities. This involved coaching, mentorship, and community events.

== Honours ==
MBA D1

- Winners (1): 2022–23

MBA D2

- Winners (1): 2022–23

Joe Jagger Cup

- Runners Up (1): 2022–23

MBA D3

- Winners (1): 2021–22

Nobby Crouch Plate

- Winners (1): 2021–22

== Season by season ==
Champions	Runners-up	Playoff berth
DNQ	Did not qualify	

Bexley Tigers
Season	Tier	League	Finish	Pld	W	L	Win%	Playoffs	Cup	Trophy	Head coach
2021–22	7	MBA 3	1st ▲	10	10	0	1.000	1st Round	DNQ	Winners	Jerry Jaranilla
2022–23	6	MBA 2	1st ▲	16	14	2	.875	DNC	1st Round	Quarter-final	Akin Lisk-Carew
2022–23	5	MBA 1	1st ▲	14	13	1	.929	DNC	Runners Up	DNC	Jerry Jaranilla
2023–24	No team entered in the League										

=== Head coaches ===
2021–2023	(Philippines) Jerry Jaranilla
