= Canterbury Christ Church University =

University in Kent, England

- Coat of arms
- Motto: Latin: Veritas liberabit vos
- Motto in English: The truth shall set you free
- Type: Public
- Established: 2005 – gained University status 1962 – teacher training college
- Religious affiliation: Church of England
- Academic affiliations: Universities at Medway; Cathedrals Group; Million+
- Chancellor: Archbishop of Canterbury, ex officio
- Vice-Chancellor: Claire Ozanne
- Students: 38,385 (2024/25)
- Undergraduates: 35,395 (2024/25)
- Postgraduates: 2,990 (2024/25)
- Other students: 65 FE
- Location: Canterbury, Kent, England, UK; 51°16′47″N 1°5′21″E
- Campus: Urban
Colours
Cardinal red and purple
- Website: canterbury.ac.uk

Canterbury Christ Church University (CCCU) is a public research university located in Canterbury, Kent, England. Founded as a Church of England college for teacher training in 1962, it was granted university status in 2005.

Canterbury Christ Church University is a member of the Cathedrals Group (officially the Council of Church Universities and Colleges or CCUC), and of MillionPlus, the Association for Modern Universities in the UK.

== History ==
=== Establishment ===
Canterbury Christ Church College (CCCC) was established in 1962 by the Church of England to address the growing need for teachers in church schools during a period of national shortage. Initially, classes were held in the priory adjacent to St Martin's Church in Canterbury. The founding principal was Frederic Mason.

In 1968, the college introduced its first degree programme—the Bachelor of Education as a one-year extension to the existing Certificate in Education. In 1976, it launched its first non-teaching degree, a Bachelor of Arts in Religious Studies. During the late 1980s, the college expanded significantly with the addition of health studies, and by 1988, student enrollment had reached approximately 1,500.

=== University college status ===
In 1995, the college was awarded the authority by the Privy Council to grant its own degrees for taught courses, upon which the college's name was changed to Canterbury Christ Church University College. This form of the name was adopted to avoid confusion with Christ Church, Oxford (one of the Oxford University colleges) and University of Canterbury, in Christchurch, New Zealand.

=== University status ===
The college was granted the university status in 2005, which recognised the delivery of degree programmes and adopted a new name, Canterbury Christ Church University (CCCU).

The Archbishop of Canterbury was later appointed, by virtue of office, as chancellor. The inauguration of the university and the installation of Rowan Williams as chancellor took place in a ceremony at Canterbury Cathedral in December 2005.

In 2007, the university attracted publicity due to its controversial policy forbidding civil partnership ceremonies to take place at its properties. This decision by the university's governing body has since been reversed and in 2018, the university sponsored Pride Canterbury.

In 2009, the university was granted power to award research degrees by the Privy Council.

The 50th anniversary of the foundation was celebrated in September 2012, with a ceremony in Canterbury Cathedral at which more than 60 surviving members of the first intake were awarded honorary Bachelor of Education degrees and the chancellor, Rowan Williams, was awarded an honorary doctorate.

In February 2013, Justin Welby became the 105th Archbishop of Canterbury and became chancellor of the university. In October 2013, Rama Thirunamachandran joined the university and in March of the following year was officially installed as vice-chancellor and principal in a ceremony held at Canterbury Cathedral. In February 2025, he announced he would be retiring in January 2026, shortly after announcing that hundreds of university jobs would be at risk despite a reported budget surplus in the 2023/24 academic year. Despite a subsequent 96% percent vote of no confidence from UCU in mid 2025, Rama and the senior management team remained in post.

As of April 2026, Professor Claire Ozanne took over the post of Vice-Chancellor and Principal.

== Campuses ==
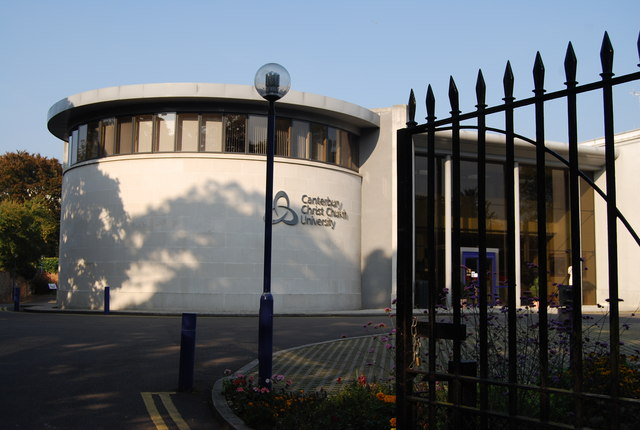
The Old Sessions House – North Holmes Road Campus

=== North Holmes ===
The university's Canterbury Campus, at North Holmes Road overseen for many years by Bursar James (Jim) Blanthorn, is built on land which was once used for orchards and domestic buildings of the adjacent St Augustine's Abbey, part of Canterbury's World Heritage Site. The campus is a low-rise development centred on a courtyard adjacent to the chapel of Christ in Majesty. The chapel roof, formed of four isosceles triangles in glass, is a distinctive local landmark. The campus buildings are largely named after former Archbishops of Canterbury.

The North Holmes site falls within the St Augustine Abbey element of the Canterbury UNESCO World Heritage Site (WHS) (the WHS also includes Canterbury Cathedral and St Martin's Church). The university includes an orchard containing local varieties of apple, a physic garden, and the growing of hops that are used to produce an annual brew of green hop beer.

The nearby Grade II listed former church of St Gregory, has been developed as a performance space for the university's choirs and musical ensembles. Most of these performances are open to the public.

In addition to its main Canterbury Campus, the university occupies other sites around the city including Christ Church Sports Centre, Augustine House and the St George's Centre.

=== Christ Church Sports Centre ===
In 2009, the university built Christ Church Sports Centre which houses health and fitness facilities for students and staff. The centre includes facilities for a variety of sports including cricket, volleyball, badminton, football and netball, an exercise studio, a climbing wall and a gym. The university was used as preparation grounds by the national team of Puerto Rico at the 2012 Summer Olympics.

=== St George's Centre ===
The St George's Centre opened at the beginning of the 2012 academic year. This incorporated the students' union facilities (until 2022), A bar and accommodation for 200 students.

=== Recent developments at the Canterbury campus ===
Following the university's purchase of the former Canterbury Prison site in April 2014, the university undertook a review of its entire estate to ensure that it was able to meet the university's strategic and academic vision.

In April 2017, Canterbury City Council approved the university's plans for a new arts building on the North Holmes Campus. Named Daphne Oram, the building officially opened in 2019, and provides a creative arts facilities and exhibition space.

Plans for a new building for science, engineering, technology and health were approved in December 2017. The building project was awarded over £6m of government funding along with £7m of funding from the Higher Education Funding Council for England. The new building, named the Verena Holmes Building, opened in January 2021 and is home to the university's Kent and Medway Engineering, Design, Growth and Enterprise (EDGE) Hub and new courses in Biomedical Engineering, Chemical Engineering, Mechanical Engineering, Product Design and Software Engineering. It also provides teaching space for the Kent and Medway Medical School – a joint initiative with the University of Kent, which opened in 2020.

=== Medway ===
The Medway campus opened in October 2004 as part of the Universities at Medway partnership, which includes the three universities; Canterbury Christ Church University, the University of Kent and the University of Greenwich.

Programmes in health, social care and early years are provided here. The campus is home to the university's Centre for Health and Social Care and has been equipped with a mixture of teaching space, specialist facilities and staff offices. The two buildings on this campus are Rowan Williams Court (RWC), and Cathedral Court.

Students and staff also have access to the re-furbished Drill Hall Library, which has been created in the former Royal Engineers Drill Hall, and is used by all students from the Universities at Medway partnership.

=== Tunbridge Wells ===
The university's Salomons Institute for Applied Psychology is based at Meadow Road, in the centre of Tunbridge Wells. This offers postgraduate clinical psychology programmes including a doctorate in clinical psychology and a PhD in professional practice. It also provides training for local NHS Trusts.

It was formerly based at the Salomons Estate and moved to its present location in October 2017; comedian, and former psychiatric nurse, Jo Brand officially opened the building.

== Academic profile ==
=== Partnerships ===
The university has a range of partnerships in five categories:

- Academic partners with whom the university develops its course to ensure they meet the needs of future employers and graduates, including Global Banking School and London School of Commerce.
- Research partners with whom the university works on research and knowledge exchange.
- Education partners – as Kent's largest centre for teacher training, the university works with schools, colleges and education providers to promote access to learning.
- Culture – the university is a supporter and provider of arts and culture, and is principal partner and sponsor of the Canterbury Festival.
- Faith – the university is part of the global partnership of Anglican higher education institutions.

=== Research ===
The university's research was recognised in the 2021 Research Excellence Framework, which found that Canterbury Christ Church University had more than doubled its proportion of world-leading (4*) research and quadrupled its proportion of world-leading (4*) impact since 2014.

=== Teaching ===
In June 2017, the university was awarded a silver rating in the Teaching Excellence Framework (TEF). In its citation, the assessment panel said that the university ‘consistently exceeds rigorous national quality requirements for UK higher education’ and delivers ‘high-quality teaching, learning and outcomes for its students’. In the 2023 TEF assessment, the university maintained its overall silver rating. A report published by the Higher Education Funding Council for England in 2016 stated that the university was in the top 20 for the percentage of teaching staff holding a teaching qualification.

=== Sustainability ===
Sustainability is a priority for the university and is one of the cross-cutting themes of the university's strategic framework (2015 to 2020). In May 2018, the university won an International Green Gown Award for "Continuous Improvement: Institutional Change" in recognition of its commitment to sustainability and its progress in this area. In 2019, this was followed by the university's Zulfi Ali winning the Green Gown award for individual Sustainability Champion.

Between 2010 and 2016, the university reduced its gas and electricity consumption by almost 25%. In 2013, it became one of the first universities to commit to and achieve ‘zero waste to landfill’ and it also achieved ISO14001 certification for its Environmental Management System. It became one of the first universities to achieve the new standard in 2017.

In 2022, the university opened the Academy for Sustainable Futures, a collective entity to drive forward the university’s commitments to sustainability.

=== Governance and structure ===
The university is governed by its Governing Body comprising 18 elected, appointed and co-opted members. The Governing Body meets four times per year. The day-to-day management of the university is the responsibility of the Vice-Chancellor and his senior management team.

Canterbury Christ Church is organised into academic faculties that contain schools and centres for teaching and research as well as professional service departments that provide central services

The four academic schools are:

- School of Business, Law and Policing
- School of Nursing, Midwifery, Public and Allied Health
- School of Sciences, Psychology, Arts and Humanities, Computing and Engineering
- School of Social Work, Education and Teacher Education

=== Rankings and reputation ===
Rankings
National rankings
- Complete (2027): 92=
- Guardian (2026): 107
- Times / Sunday Times (2026): 81

Global rankings
- QS (2027): 1400+
- THE (2026): 1201–1500

In the 2023 Guardian rating of UK universities, Canterbury Christ Church University was ranked the 108th university. It ranked 3rd in the UK for graduate employment in the 2022 Graduate Outcomes survey.

== Student life ==
=== Students' Union ===
Canterbury Christ Church Students’ Union is based at the North Holmes Road campus. It is a registered charity whose role is to support and represent students studying at Christ Church. It offers support and advice services and runs campaigns to promote student health and wellbeing, sustainability and equality and diversity.

Christ Church Students' Union also supports over 80 student-led clubs and societies including societies related to courses offered at the university along with cultural, political, recreational and sports societies.

=== Canterbury Varsity ===
Each year, for over 20 years, the sports clubs at Canterbury Christ Church University and the University of Kent compete in Canterbury Varsity. Varsity sports include football, rugby, lacrosse, netball, volleyball, swimming, dance, basketball, hockey and tennis.

=== Student media ===
CSR, the Community and Student Radio Station, starting broadcasting in 2007. The station holds a Community FM licence and it was the first student-led community radio station to be award this licence. The station broadcasts shows 24 hours a day, 365 days a year, from two studios, one based at the university’s Canterbury Campus and another at the University of Kent. CSR won Best Station Sound at the 2021 Student Radio Awards.

Unified is the university's student news outlet. In 2017 it won the Best Development in the South of England Award from the Student Publication Association.

== Notable alumni ==
- Steve Backshall – naturalist, explorer, presenter and writer
- Rob Beckett – Comedian studied Tourism Management between 2004 and 2007
- Kate Blewett – producer and director with the BBC
- Phil Gallagher – children's TV presenter
- Abdulrazak Gurnah - winner of the Nobel Prize in Literature
- Jon Holmes – writer, script editor and presenter
- Joel Hopkins – BAFTA award-winning film writer–director
- Geraldine McCaughrean – children's author
- Dorothée Munyaneza – actor, singer, dancer and choreographer
- Noel Paine - artist
- Alessia Russo - footballer

== See also ==
- Armorial of UK universities
- College of Education
- Dover Christ Church Academy - school in Dover sponsored by the university
- John Wallis Academy – school in Ashford sponsored by the university
- List of universities in the UK
