= Richard Symonds-Tayler =

Royal Navy Admiral (1897–1971)

Admiral Sir Richard Symonds-Tayler KBE CB DSC
- Born: 1897
- Died: 1971 (aged 73–74)
- Military career
- Allegiance: United Kingdom
- Branch: Royal Navy
- Service years: 1910–1952
- Rank: Admiral
- Commands: HMS Centurion; HMS Sussex; HMS London; 1st Cruiser Squadron; Senior British Naval Officer, Western Atlantic
- Conflicts: World War I World War II
- Awards: Knight Commander of the Order of the British Empire; Companion of the Order of the Bath; Distinguished Service Cross

Admiral Sir Richard Victor Symonds-Tayler KBE CB DSC (1897–1971) was a Royal Navy officer who went on to be Commander-in-Chief, America and West Indies Station.

== Naval career ==
Symonds-Tayler joined the Royal Navy in 1910 and served in World War I. He was seconded to the British Naval Mission to Greece in 1929 and was given command of HMS Centurion in 1938.

He served in World War II as Commanding Officer of HMS Sussex and then as Director Training and Staff Duties at the Admiralty until December 1942 when he was given command of HMS London.

After the War he was made Chief of Staff to the Commander-in-Chief, Portsmouth, and then Chief of Staff to the British Naval Representative on the United Nations Military Staff Committee in 1946. He was appointed Flag Officer commanding 1st Cruiser Squadron in 1947 and Commander-in-Chief, America and West Indies Station, in 1949; he made an official visit to Buenos Aires in 1951 and retired in 1952.

Military offices
| Preceded by Sir William Tennant | Commander-in-Chief, America and West Indies Station; 1949–1951 | Succeeded by Sir William Andrewes |
