= Medway School of Science =

University of Greenwich
- Motto: "To learn, to do, to achieve."
- Established: 1992
- Affiliations: University of Greenwich
- Location: Chatham Maritime, Kent, United Kingdom; 51°23′51″N 0°32′24″E
- Campus: Medway
- Website: http://www.gre.ac.uk/science

The Medway School of Science is one of the schools of the University of Greenwich in South East England. The School of Science is based on the university's Medway campus in Chatham Maritime in the county of Kent. The School of Science has activity in both research and teaching and covers topics such as chemistry, pharmaceutical sciences, earth and environmental sciences, biosciences and sports science.

== History ==
The School of Science has inherited the history of the University of Greenwich, which has been involved in the teaching of science for over 100 years and dates back to 1890 when Woolwich Polytechnic was founded. Indeed, prior to moving to the Medway campus in 2002, the School of Science occupied the old Thames Polytechnic buildings in Woolwich.

== Organisation ==
The School of Science consists of two academic departments and a consultancy department:

- Pharmaceutical, Chemical and Environmental Sciences
- Life and Sports Sciences
- Medway Sciences

== Teaching ==
The School of Science teaches a wide range of subjects at both undergraduate and postgraduate level. Subjects include:

- Biomedical Science
- Biosciences
- Biotechnology
- Chemistry
- Environmental Conservation
- Environmental Science and Geography
- Forensic Science
- Formulation science
- Geographical Information Systems
- Human Nutrition
- Industrial Pharmaceutical Studies
- Pharmaceutical Science
- Remote Sensing
- Sports Science
- Sustainability

The School of Science is one of the Higher Education institutions in the South East of the UK that still runs a BSc in Chemistry while its BSc Biomedical Science degree is one of the few degrees in the South East of the UK to be accredited by the Institute of Biomedical Science. Its BSc Bioscience degree has recently been the first degree of its kind to receive special recognition from the Institute of Biology. The School is currently pioneering a popular, innovative on-line Biomedical Science master's degree.

The School has a number of text books written by its academic staff, both past and present. These include Molecular Biology of Cancer by Lauren Pecorino, Ultraviolet and Visible Spectroscopy: Analytical Chemistry by Open Learning by Michael J. K. Thomas and David J. Ando, and the seminal works Vogel's Textbook of Practical Organic Chemistry and Vogel's Quantitative Chemical Analysis by Arthur Vogel, John Mendham, R.C. Denney, J. D. Barnes, and Michael J. K. Thomas.

== Research ==
The School of Science is active over a wide range of disciplines and a number of its researchers have roles within the Engineering and Physical Sciences Research Council (EPSRC). Collaborations in pharmaceutical and formulation sciences have led to links with Pfizer, GlaxoSmithKline and BP. Research in remediation technologies, sustainability and alternative energy sources (such as solar energy and biofuels) are led by the environmental science research at the School while sports, exercise and physiology research, biomarkers and nutrition research is underway in the Department of Life and Sports Sciences.

== Campus ==
The School of Science is based in Chatham Maritime on the site of the former HMS Pembroke naval barracks at the historic Chatham Dockyard. In 2007 it re-opened its teaching laboratory after a £1.5million investment.
