= Kent Design Awards =

Awards in design excellence

- Awarded for: To celebrate the high quality development delivered throughout Kent
- Country: UK
- Presented by: Kent Design Initiative (part of Kent County Council)
- First award: 2003
- Website: Kent Design Initiative

These awards were created to celebrate design excellence in Kent and were first staged in 2003 and are usually held every two years. They were then renamed 'Kent Design and Development Awards' in 2012. Then have stayed as the 'Kent Design and Development Awards' in 2014.

== 2003 ==
- Commercial and Industrial Building winner - Holiday Extras HQ Building, Newingreen, Hythe
- Public Building winner - Riverhead Infant School, Sevenoaks
- Urban Design and Town Centre Renewal winner - St. Mildreds Lavender Mews, Canterbury
- Best Individual House - Lynwood, Tunbridge Wells (private residence)
- Housebuilding for Quality winner - Ingress Park, Greenhithe
- Overall winner - Lynwood, Tunbridge Wells (private residence)

Highly Commended was Romney Warren Visitor Centre

== 2004 ==
- Housebuilding for Quality winner - Vista (private residence), Dungeness
- Public Building/Education winner - St Augustine's RC School, Hythe
- Town and Village Renaissance - Horsebridge and Brownings Yard, Whitstable
- Overall Winner - St Augustine's RC School, Hythe

== 2005/2006 ==
- Public Building winner - Trosley Country Park amenity block
- Commercial, Industrial and retail winner - Kings Hill Village Centre
- Housebuilding winner - Iden Farm Cottage, Boughton Monchelsea, near Maidstone
- Building Renovation winner - The Old Gymnasium, Deal Cavalry Barracks, Deal
- Best New Neighbourhood winner - Affordable village housing in Ash Grove, St Margaret's at Cliffe, near Dover.
- Overall Winner - The Goods Shed, Canterbury

== 2007/2008 ==
Also nominated was Sevenoaks Kaleidoscope museum, library and gallery, although misleadingly named as a winner on an architects brochure.

- Commercial, Industrial and retail winner - Broadside (HQ of MHS Homes), Chatham
- Housebuilding winner - Sandling Park (a residential scheme), Maidstone
- Building Renovation (joint winners) - Pilkington Building and Drill Hall Library, within the Universities at Medway
- Public Building winner - Parrock Street public toilets, Gravesend (Gravesham Community Project PFI)
- Landscape category winner - Lower Leas Coastal Park, Folkestone
- Overall Winner - The Pines Calyx, St Margaret's at Cliffe

== 2010 ==
30 projects were shortlisted in seven categories from more than 60 entries. The Medway Building at the University of Kent as part of the Universities at Medway, was nominated for Best Public Building. Also nominated was Crossway Low Energy House, near Maidstone.

- Conservation & Craftsmanship Category winner - The Darnley Mausoleum, Cobham
- Town & Village Renaissance winner - Ashford Shared Space
- Residential overall winner - The Quays (towers with the former Chatham Dockyard), Chatham Maritime
- Residential (major development) winner - The Quays, Chatham Maritime
- Residential (minor development) winner - El Ray, Dungeness
- Commercial, Industrial & Retail winner - Deal Pier
- Public Buildings (general) winner - Quarterhouse, Folkestone
- Public Buildings (schools) winner - St. James the Great Primary & Nursery School, East Malling
- Project of the Year - the Lord Sandy Bruce-Lockhart Award - The Darnley Mausoleum, Cobham

== 2012 (Renamed as 'Kent Design and Development Awards') ==
Jointly organised and sponsored by 'DHA Planning' (town planning and transport consultancy), Kent County Council and Ward Homes (public housing management).

94 nominees including Sevenoaks School Performing Arts Centre and Cornwallis Academy.

- Commercial, Industrial and Retail winner - Rocksalt Restaurant, Folkestone
- Public Buildings Education winner - Marlowe Theatre, Canterbury
- Civils and Infrastructure winner - Dover Esplande, sea frontage
- Environmental Performance winner - Hadlow College
- Minor Residential winner - Hill House, Ulcombe
- Major Residential winner - Rosemary Gardens, Park Wood
- Public Buildings, Community winner - Turner Contemporary
- Public Buildings, Education winner - Walderslade Primary School
- Project of the Year (Sponsored by DHA Planning) - Rocksalt Restaurant, Folkestone

== 2014 Kent Design and Development Awards ==
The shortlist was announced in September 2014; Categories Include:

- Major Residential category - Horsted Park, Chatham
- Minor Residential category - Pobble House, Romney Marsh
- Commercial, Industrial and Retail category - Medway Crematorium
- Civils and Infrastructure category - Sandwich Town Tidal Defences
- Education Public Buildings category - Goat Lees Primary School, Ashford
- Community Public Buildings category - Cyclopark, Gravesend
- Environmental Performance category - Goat Lees Primary School, Ashford

Overall winner ‘Project of the year’ - Goat Lees Primary School, Ashford,

== 2016 Awards ==
Twenty-three developments were shortlisted for the eight categories; Winners:

- Commercial, Industrial and Retail category - The Wing, Capel-le-Ferne
- Conservation category - Command of the Oceans at Chatham Historic Dockyard,
- Environmental Performance category - North Vat, a house near Dungeness,
- Infrastructure and Renewables category - the cut and cover tunnel at Hermitage Quarry, Barming, by Gallagher Ltd,
- Education Public Buildings category - The Yarrow in Broadstairs,
- Community Public Buildings category - Fairfield (part of East Kent College) in Dartford
- Minor Residential category - Nautical Mews in Margate,
- Major Residential category - Farrow Court in Ashford and Wallis Fields in Maidstone,

The Wing for the Battle of Britain Memorial Trust at Capel-le-Ferne was named Project of the Year.
