= MillionPlus =

Association of modern universities in the UK

- Formation: 1997; 29 years ago
- Type: Association of UK universities
- Location: United Kingdom
- Members: 23
- Chair: Graham Baldwin
- Chief Executive: Rachel Hewitt
- Website: www.millionplus.ac.uk

MillionPlus, formerly known as million+, the Campaign for Mainstream Universities, and the Coalition of Modern Universities (CMU), is a membership organisation, which aims to promote the role of "modern universities" in the UK higher education system; it describes itself as "The Association for Modern Universities in the UK". MillionPlus is not for profit and funded by subscriptions from its members, currently 23 UK universities. While all of the member institutions are "new" universities, many have long histories as colleges and polytechnics.

== Overview ==
Formed in 1997 as the Coalition of Modern Universities, the name was changed in 2004 to the Campaign for Mainstream Universities. In November 2007, the organisation was rebranded to million+. This name was chosen to reflect the fact that the member institutions educate over a million students. In April 2016, the organisation rebranded again to MillionPlus.

MillionPlus is involved in the political debate about the role and contribution of universities to the economy and society, where it is seen as representing the post-1992 universities, known as 'new' or 'modern'. As such, it is frequently quoted in the media on higher education topics, such as the Government's green paper on higher education reform, reform of the external examination system, and the economic diversity of the student population.

The group is chaired by Professor Rama Thirunamachandran, former Vice-Chancellor of Canterbury Christ Church University. The Chief Executive is Rachel Hewitt.

== Member institutions ==
Locations of MillionPlus universities.
- Abertay University
- Anglia Ruskin University
- Bath Spa University
- University of Bedfordshire
- University of Greater Manchester
- University of Lancashire
- Canterbury Christ Church University
- University of Cumbria
- University of East London
- Edinburgh Napier University
- Glasgow Caledonian University
- University of the Highlands and Islands
- Leeds Trinity University
- Liverpool John Moores University
- London Metropolitan University
- London South Bank University
- Queen Margaret University
- Solent University
- Staffordshire University
- University of Sunderland
- University of West London
- University of the West of Scotland
- The University of Wolverhampton

== See also ==
- 1994 Group
- GuildHE
- Russell Group
- University Alliance
- Universities UK
- Armorial of UK universities
