= William Andrewes =

Royal Navy Admiral (1899–1974)

Admiral Sir William Andrewes KBE CB DSO
- Rear Admiral Andrewes in February 1948.
- Born: 3 November 1899; St Giles Hill, Winchester, Hampshire
- Died: 21 November 1974 (aged 75); St Cross, Winchester, Hampshire
- Burial place: St Andrew's Church, Chilcomb, Hampshire
- Military career
- Allegiance: United Kingdom
- Branch: Royal Navy
- Service years: 1912–1957
- Rank: Admiral
- Commands: HMS Albatross; HMS Uganda; HMS Indomitable; 5th Cruiser Squadron; British and Commonwealth Naval Forces, Korea; United Nations Task Force 91; America and West Indies Squadron; Royal Naval College, Greenwich
- Conflicts: World War I World War II; Korean War
- Awards: Knight Commander of the Order of the British Empire; Companion of the Order of the Bath; Companion of the Distinguished Service Order
- Other work: Company director

Admiral Sir William Gerrard Andrewes KBE CB DSO (3 November 1899 – 21 November 1974) was a Royal Navy officer who served in World War I and World War II, commanded the British and Commonwealth Naval Forces and Task Force 91 (part of the Joint Task Force 7, UN Combined Fleet) for the Inchon Landing during the Korean War, and went on to command of the America and West Indies Squadron and served as Deputy Supreme Allied Commander, Atlantic.

== Biography ==
=== Education and early career ===
William Andrewes was the second son of the Rev. Canon Gerrard Thomas Andrewes, rector of the village of Chilcomb near Winchester and honorary Canon of Winchester Cathedral, and Helena Louisa Kirby. He was educated at Twyford School, Winchester, before entering the Royal Naval College at Osborne in September 1912, moving to Dartmouth in 1914.

Andrewes was assigned to the battleship Canada in August 1915, seeing action at the Battle of Jutland in May 1916. From February 1917 he attended the torpedo control officer's course, and was assigned to the destroyer Walrus for service in the Baltic Sea in February 1918. He received his commission as a sub-lieutenant on 15 May 1918, and promotion to lieutenant on 15 October 1919. Andrewes attended various short training courses in 1920 before serving aboard the destroyer Versatile into 1921.

Between September 1921 and June 1923 he attended the torpedo officer's "long course" in torpedoes, mines, and electrical engineering at the Royal Naval College at Greenwich and at the torpedo school at HMS Vernon at Portsmouth. He was then an instructor at HMS Vernon until December 1924.

Andrewes served as Torpedo Officer aboard the submarine depot ship Ambrose of the 4th Submarine Flotilla on the China Station until February 1927. He returned to Vernon as an instructor until August 1929, receiving promotion to lieutenant-commander on 15 October 1927.

From 6 January 1930 Andrewes served as Torpedo Officer on the battleship Warspite in the Mediterranean and Atlantic Fleets, then from 30 April 1931 aboard the heavy cruiser Kent as Torpedo Officer, as well as Fleet Torpedo Officer for the 5th Cruiser Squadron, on the China Station. On 31 December 1932 he was promoted to commander.

Andrewes spent almost all of the year 1934 attending a course at the Royal Navy Staff College at Greenwich, before serving as the Fleet Torpedo Officer in the 2nd Battle Squadron, Home Fleet, aboard the battleship Nelson from January 1935 to January 1937. He then spent six weeks in charge, as Executive Officer, of Warspite as that battleship was being extensively refitted at Portsmouth. After a tactical course at Portsmouth, he served as Executive Officer of the battleship Rodney in the Home Fleet from 26 July 1937 until receiving promotion to the rank of captain on 30 June 1938.

=== World War II ===
In 1939 he served on the Joint Planning Staff of the Committee of Imperial Defence, then as Commanding Officer of the seaplane carrier Albatross into 1940, before a short period as Chief Staff Officer at Dover. On 8 April 1940 he was appointed assistant director of the Plans Division at the Admiralty, not returning to sea duty until 19 September 1942 when he took command of the cruiser Uganda for service in the Atlantic and Mediterranean, taking part in "Operation Husky", the Allied invasion of Sicily, in July–August 1943, (for which he received a Mention in Despatches) and in "Operation Avalanche", the landings at Salerno, in September 1943 (for which he was appointed a Companion of the Distinguished Service Order).

On 28 February 1944 he was appointed Deputy Chief of Staff to the Commander-in-Chief, Portsmouth, for administration and duties in preparation for the Normandy landings, with the rank of commodore, 2nd class. From November 1944 until July 1945 he served as Chief Staff Officer to Vice-Admiral James William Rivett-Carnac, who as Vice-Admiral (Q) was responsible for the entire logistical operation to support the British Pacific Fleet.

=== Post-war and Korean War ===
Andrewes was appointed Commanding Officer of the aircraft carrier Formidable in August 1945, but a knee injury prevented him from assuming the post, and instead he commanded the carrier Indomitable from December 1945 into 1947. He then served as Chief of Staff to Commander-in-Chief Portsmouth, and was appointed Naval Aide-de-camp to the King in July. In December 1947 he was appointed Senior Naval Member of the Directing Staff of the Imperial Defence College, and was promoted to rear admiral on 8 January 1948.

He was promoted to vice admiral on 1 December 1950, and on the 17th was made commander of the 5th Cruiser Squadron and Flag Officer Second in Command Far East Fleet, flying his flag in the light cruiser Belfast. After the outbreak of the Korean War in June 1950 he commanded British and Commonwealth Naval Forces, with the carrier Theseus as his flagship. He had two aircraft carriers available at any one time which he worked in eighteen-day cycles. and then Task Force 91 (comprising all Blockade, Covering Force and Escort ships in Korean waters, affiliated with the United Nations Command) in 1951.

From 15 October 1951 he served as Commander-in-Chief of the America and West Indies Station, and also as Deputy Supreme Allied Commander, Atlantic (DSACLANT), from 1952 to 1953. Promoted to admiral on 24 November 1954 he served as President of the Royal Naval College, Greenwich, until 1956.

Admiral Andrewes retired on 10 January 1957, and became a director of the shipbuilders John I. Thornycroft & Company having become a member of the Institution of Electrical Engineers in May 1956.

He died on 21 November 1974.

== Personal life ==
He married Frances Audrey Welchman (1902–2006) in 1927. They had one son and one daughter. Sir William and Lady Andrewes are buried in the churchyard of St Andrew's, Chilcomb.

== Awards ==
Admiral Andrewes was the recipient of numerous awards and distinctions, as well as campaign medals for World War I, World War II, and the Korean War.

Commander of the Venerable Order of Saint John, 1964
Officer of the Venerable Order of Saint John, 1960
Knight of the Kungliga Svärdsorden (Swedish Royal Order of the Sword), 1954
Commander of the Legion of Merit (United States), 1953
The Silver Star (United States), 1951
Knight Commander of the Order of the British Empire (KBE), 1951
Companion of the Order of the Bath (CB), 1949 Birthday Honours
Officer of the Legion of Merit (United States), 1946
War Cross 3rd class (Greece), 1946
Commander of the Order of the British Empire (CBE), 1945 New Year Honours
Cpmpanion of the Distinguished Service Order (DSO), 1944
Mention in Despatches, 1943

Military offices
Preceded by Sir Richard Symonds-Tayler	Commander-in-Chief, America and West Indies Station; 1951–1953	Succeeded by Sir John Stevens
Preceded by Sir Aubrey Mansergh	President, Royal Naval College, Greenwich; 1954–1956	Succeeded by Sir Geoffrey Barnard
