= Alan Scott-Moncrieff =

Royal Navy Admiral (1900-1980)

Admiral Sir Alan Scott-Moncrieff KCB CBE DSO*
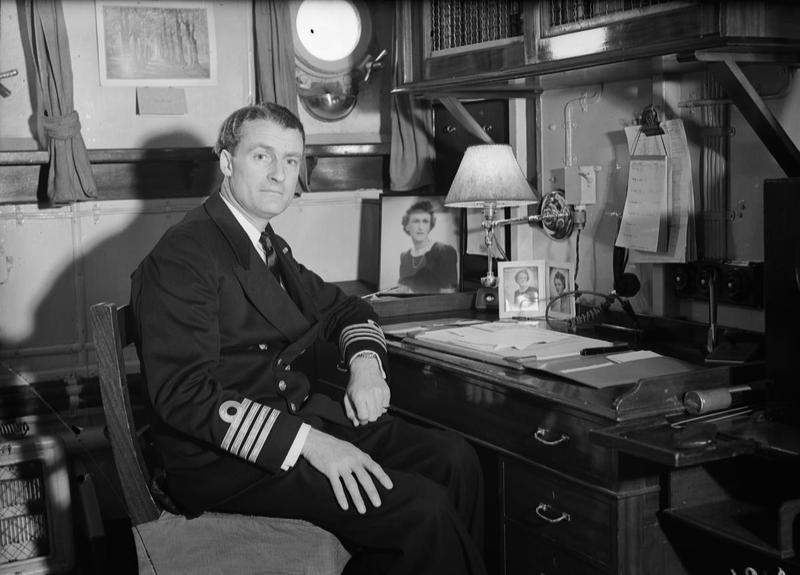
- Scott-Moncrieff onboard HMS Faulknor in 1943
- Born: Alan Kenneth Scott-Moncrieff; 3 September 1900; Belgrano, Buenos Aires, Argentina
- Died: 25 November 1980 (aged 80); Henley-on-Thames, Oxfordshire
- Military career
- Allegiance: United Kingdom
- Branch: Royal Navy
- Service years: 1917–1958
- Rank: Admiral
- Commands: Far East Fleet (1955–57); 5th Cruiser Squadron (1951–52); HMS Superb (1948–49); HMS Mercury (1943–45); 8th Destroyer Flotilla (1942–43); HMS Faulknor (1942–43); HMS Enchantress (1939–40)
- Conflicts: First World War; Second World War; Korean War
- Awards: Knight Commander of the Order of the Bath; Commander of the Order of the British Empire; Distinguished Service Order & Bar; Mentioned in Despatches (3); Commander of the Legion of Merit (United States); King Haakon VII Freedom Cross (Norway)

Admiral Sir Alan Kenneth Scott-Moncrieff, KCB, CBE, DSO & Bar (3 September 1900 – 25 November 1980) was a Royal Navy officer who served as Commander-in-Chief, Far East Fleet from 1955 to 1957.

== Early life and education ==
Scott-Moncrieff was born in Buenos Aires, Argentina, the eldest son of Robert Lawrence Scott-Moncrieff and Victorine Troutbeck, whose father, John Brown Troutbeck, had settled in Buenos Aires. He was a cousin of Sir George Kenneth Scott-Moncrieff.

He was educated at the Royal Naval College at Osborne and Dartmouth.

== Naval career ==
When still a teenager, Scott-Moncrieff joined the Royal Navy in 1917, in the last year of the First World War, serving as a midshipman in HMS Orion.

Scott-Moncrieff also served in the Second World War as captain of HMS Enchantress and then as Chief Signals Officer to Admiral Lord Louis Mountbatten at Combined Operations Headquarters in 1941 before becoming captain of HMS Faulknor in 1942.

After the war, Scott-Moncrieff was made Chief of Staff to Admiral Sir Arthur Palliser, Commander-in-Chief in the East Indies and then commanded HMS Superb from 1949. He was made Chairman of the Naval Advisory Committee at the North Atlantic Treaty Organization in 1950 and second-in-command Far East Fleet and commander of 5th Cruiser Squadron in 1951. He was appointed Commander of the Commonwealth Naval Forces serving in the Korean War in 1952 and Admiral commanding the Reserves in 1953. His last appointment was as Commander-in-Chief, Far East Fleet in 1955; in September 1955 he paid an official visit to Australia. He retired in 1958.

== Honours ==
Scott-Moncrieff was appointed a Companion of the Distinguished Service Order (DSO) in 1942, and mentioned in despatches in the 1944 New Year Honours. He was awarded a Bar to the DSO in 1944. and again mentioned in despatches later that year. He was appointed a Companion of the military division of the Order of the Bath in the 1952 New Year Honours. He was mentioned in despatches, appointed a Commander of the Order of the British Empire (CBE) and appointed a Commander of the United States Legion of Merit for his service in Korean waters in 1952. He was promoted to Knight Commander of the Order of the Bath (KCB) in the 1955 Birthday Honours.

He was appointed a Deputy Lieutenant of the County of London in 1962, resigning in 1976.

Military offices
Preceded by Sir Charles Lambe	Commander-in-Chief, Far East Fleet; 1955–1957	Succeeded by Sir Gerald Gladstone
