= Drill Hall Library =

Library in Kent, England

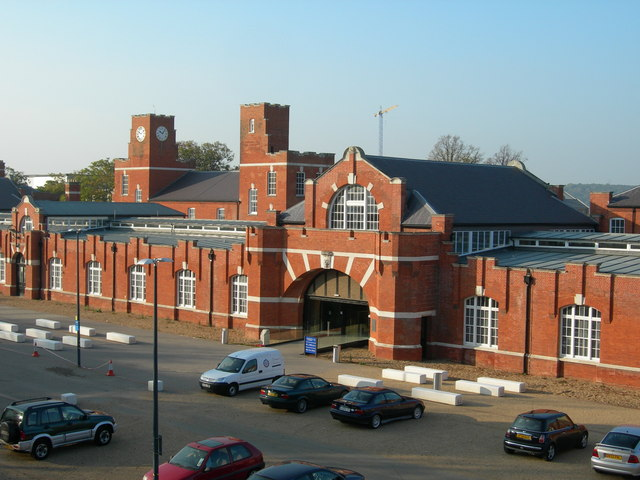
- Drill Hall and Parade Ground, Chatham

- Location within Kent

General information
- Type: Drill hall
- Location: Chatham, Kent
- Coordinates: 51°23′54″N 0°32′23″E
- Construction started: 1897
- Opened: 1902
- Client: War Office

Design and construction
- Architect: Sir Henry Pilkington

Listed Building – Grade II
- Official name: The Drill Hall
- Designated: 06 June 1984
- Reference no.: 1259644

The Drill Hall Library in North Road, Chatham in Kent, England, was built as a military drill hall in 1902, for the Royal Navy as part of HMS Pembroke shore establishment and barracks. The barracks closed in 1984. The Grade II listed buildings of the barracks, which include the Captain's House (now a Solicitor's Offices), a Mess block (now University Offices and Restaurant), the Pilkington Building (now a cafe, student services and a lecture theatre), the four barrack blocks (now various lecture rooms), the Gymnasium, and the surrounding walls of barracks were then redeveloped as part of the Universities at Medway, a tri-partite collaboration of the University of Greenwich, the University of Kent and Canterbury Christ Church University on a single campus. The three universities share use of the Drill Hall Library.

== Features ==
The drill shed is about 250 yards (228.6 metres) long and 25 yards (22.86 metres) wide, with solid brick walls, with offices along one side. It has a glass roof, quarter of an inch thick. Built with brick and Portland stone dressings and arch-panelled ridge and gable stacks and slate cross-gabled roofs. It is near symmetrical, rectangular in plan with a central range with towers, flanking cross range drill halls with porches and side ranges and end cross ranges, with 3 single-storey ranges along the front.

== History of HMS Pembroke and the Drill Shed ==
In 1801 Fort Amherst and the Great Lines (fortifications between Gillingham and Chatham) were manned by the Chatham Barracks. Which had room for two Infantry battalions, two companies of Foot Artillery and two Infirmary (medical corps) blocks. In 1890, the Royal Navy Depot in Chatham was founded in 1890, aboard three hulks alongside the South Wall of No.2 Basin in the Dockyards. These were called Pembroke (built in 1812), Royal Adelaide and Forte. A new permanent shore base was constructed between May 1897 and 1902. This occupied the site that was used by the old Chatham Convict Prison (the convicts were used to build the Victorian extension to the Chatham Dockyard on St Mary's Island). Designed by Colonel Henry Pilkington, construction of the barracks was begun in 1897 by Holloway Brothers (London) and the first phase of development (which included the Drill Hall as it was often called) was completed on 26 March 1902. The second phase of building included the development of barrack facilities such as swimming baths and a bowling alley and was completed by December 1902, six years later. At the cost of £425,000 and it could now accommodate up to 4,742 officers and men. It was given the title of HMS Pembroke. Due to its position near the dockyards 'Pembroke Gate' and in reference to one of the former hulk ships. The Drill Hall or 'Drill Shed' and Parade Ground was completed by 26 March 1902 as part of the first phase of developing the Royal Naval Barracks in Chatham. It was constructed to provide an indoor space for Navy personnel to exercise and train during inclement weather. The swimming baths, bowling alley and other facilities being completed by December the same year, with the barrack blocks of; 'Anson', 'Blake', 'Drake', 'Grenville', 'Hawke' and 'Nelson' being completed soon after.

The barracks were officially opened on 30 April 1903. 5000 men were marched from the old hulks to the new barracks.

Later, a large house was constructed for the commodore and St Georges Church (see St. George's Chapel, Chatham) was dedicated by the Lord Bishop of Rochester John Harmer, as St George's Church on 19 December 1906.

On 2 November 1905, the local Boys' Brigade was formed at the barracks for the sons of Royal Navy and Royal Marines personnel, except commissioned officers. On 18 September 1912, Chatham sailors opened 'Pembroke House Girls Orphanage' on Oxford Road, Gillingham the orphanage was financed and managed by the Chatham Sailors. It was converted into a residential home in 1952 for The Royal Naval Benevolent Trust. The years leading up to the First World War, saw the drill hall used as an Exhibition centre, Naval store (of rum, clothes and general supplies), a building materials warehouse and as an overflow barracks with the court martial room situated on an upper floor near the rear of the building. Also during this time Chatham had become one of three Royal Navy's manning ports with the area holding over a third of the Navy and 205 ships manned by Chatham.

In 1942, King George VI made a visit to Medway and HMS Pembroke, the Royal Naval Barracks at Chatham. Due to wartime security restrictions, the King's visit was only publicised in the national press after it had occurred. This event annoyed the local press, who were not informed of his visit, until half an hour before it happened.

In 1957, the barracks and gunnery school were closed due to the local port divisions being replaced. When the Nore Command (operational commander of the Royal Navy) ended in March 1961, the barracks were being used as an accommodation centre for the re-fitting crews of the dockyard. The Drill Shed and Canteen were being used by the Dockyard.

In 1959, the barracks re-opened as the Royal Naval Supply School, who trained staff in supply and secretarial work.

In June 1981, Sir John Nott's Defence Review was published. Both the barracks and dockyard were to be closed thus severing the centuries-old link with Chatham and the Medway and it was all to happen by the end of March 1984.

In 1981, One of the 25 wedding cakes of Charles, Prince of Wales and Diana, Princess of Wales was made at Chatham Barracks.

The White Ensign (flag) was lowered in the barracks on 17 February 1984. The gates to the Naval Barracks were finally closed on 31 March 1984.

== Bombing of 3 September 1917 ==
Throughout its life, the Drill Hall has been used as a temporary overflow dormitory when the barrack accommodation blocks were full. In September 1917 the problem of housing the men had been further exacerbated by two unanticipated events: firstly, the men who had been earmarked to join the battleship HMS Vanguard had been forced to remain at the barracks, after she had been sunk at Scapa Flow in July 1917. Secondly, an outbreak of 'spotted fever' (epidemic cerebro-spinal meningitis) in the barracks meant that the sleeping accommodation had to be increased in an effort to avoid further infection. It was the necessity of using the Drill Hall, at this time that precipitated the saddest episode in the history of this building. On Monday 3 September 1917, the Drill Hall was being used as an overflow dormitory for around 900 naval ratings (either sleeping or resting upon their hammocks) when, at about 11.00 p.m., it suffered two hits from bombs dropped by German Gotha aeroplanes. One of the first of the First World War 'moonlight raids', it resulted in the loss of some 130 lives.

At 9.30 p.m., five Gotha G.V Bombers left Gontrode in Belgium. Since the greatest loss of the bombers was during the daylight raids, a decision made to carry out a night-time attack. One of the bombers encountered engine problems and had to return to their air-base but the remaining four carried on and passed over Eastchurch (on the Isle of Sheppey) at around 11.00 p.m. where they followed the River Medway towards Chatham. As this was the first night-time raid, the Medway Towns were unprepared and the whole of Chatham was illuminated with none of the anti-aircraft guns prepared for attacks. A practice alert had been carried out earlier in the day within the town, and when the aircraft were finally spotted and an alert sounded, many people ignored the warning believing it to be another practice drill. 46 bombs were dropped over Gillingham and Chatham causing much damage. The Drill Hall suffered a direct hit. The bomb shattered the glass roof, sending dangerous shards of glass flying through the drill hall before exploding when they hit the floor. The clock upon the drill hall tower stopped at 11.12, giving the exact time the bomb exploded. The men asleep or resting inside had little chance of survival, those that were not injured from the explosion were cut to pieces by the falling pieces of glass from the roof.

Ordinary Seaman Frederick W. Turpin arrived at the drill hall to offer assistance, he later recorded the scene in his notebook: "It was a gruesome task. Everywhere we found bodies in a terribly mutilated condition. Some with arms and legs missing and some headless. The gathering up of dismembered limbs turned one sick. It was a terrible affair and the old sailors, who had been in several battles, said they would rather be in ten Jutlands or Heliogolands than go through another raid such as this."

The rescuers spent 17 hours searching through the rubble for their fellow seamen, many using their bare hands to dig through the rubble. Officers and men carried the dead bodies of comrades into buildings which had been transformed into a mortuary and the seriously wounded cases into motor ambulances which sped to the local hospital.

Mr E. Cronk, who also attended to offer assistance, stated later: "The raider dropped two bombs; one in the middle of the drill shed and one near the wall of the parade round just where the sailors were sleeping. I shall never forget that night – the lights fading and the clock stopping – we of the rescue party picking out bodies, and parts of bodies, from among glass and debris and placing them in bags, fetching out bodies in hammocks and laying them on a tarpaulin on the parade ground (you could not identify them). I carried one sailor to the sick bay who was riddled with shrapnel and had no clothes left on him. In the morning, to show that the officials could tell who was who, they had a general Pipe asking all the sailors of different messes if they could identify any of the lost; it was impossible in most cases. It was one of the most terrible nights I have ever known, the crying and the moaning of dying men who had ten minutes before been fast asleep".

Mr Gideon Gardiner described the scene of the temporary morgue within the gymnasium: "Some had never woken up; apparently the shock appeared to have stopped their hearts. They were stretched out, white, gaunt, drawn faces, with eyes nearly bolting out of their heads. Others were greatly cut up, mangled, bleeding and some were blown limb from limb".

The sailors who survived with injuries were treated on site by medics and the sick bay staff, however many of the injuries were too serious and later died at the hospital. It is estimated 90 men died whilst in their hammocks and another 40 or so seriously injured, they were not expected to live. The official total of dead after the raid was 98 however with the seriously ill in hospital, the total number rose to around 136 dead.

The funeral took place on Thursday, 6 September, with the procession consisting of 18 lorries draped with the Union Jack and each carrying six coffins. These 98 men were buried at Woodlands Cemetery in Gillingham with another 25 men being interred elsewhere and later burials taking place once the ratings had been identified. All the men were buried with full military honours and were followed by a procession of marching soldiers and sailors with thousands of people lining the streets.

== Current use ==
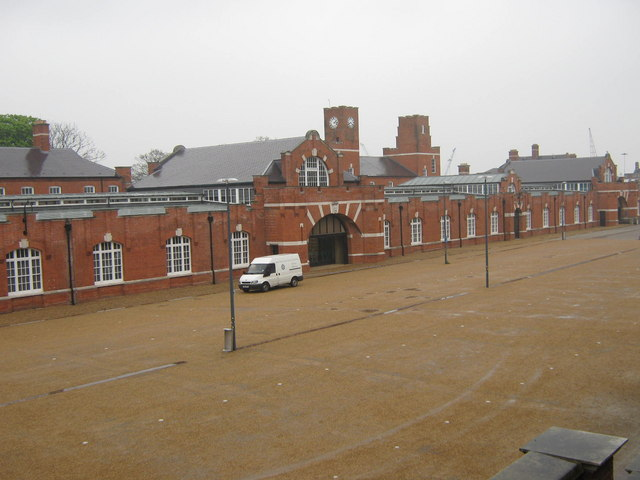
The Drill Hall Library

The renovation of the Drill Hall as a library cost £3.3 million, and was funded by the South East England Development Agency (SEEDA).

The Drill Hall Library was opened by David Miliband MP on 13 February 2006. The refurbished Drill Hall now holds the Universities at Medway library and houses 370 PC study spaces, 400 open study spaces and more than 100,000 volumes, in what is widely regarded as the longest library in Europe.

The Drill Hall Library at Medway was short listed for a prestigious Royal Institute of British Architects (RIBA) award.

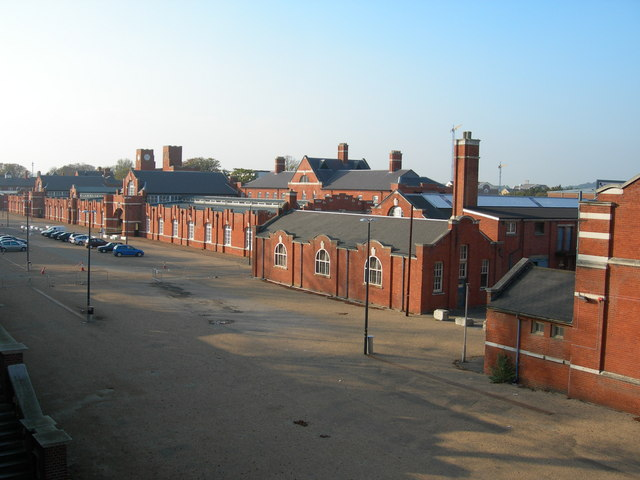
The Parade Ground, University of Greenwich

The Library, was also voted a winner by judges at the Medway Design Awards. These inaugural awards, run by the Medway Renaissance Partnership, celebrated outstanding buildings and public spaces in the region.

In 2007, the Pilkington Building (former Canteen Building, now Refectory, lecture theatre and other offices) and the Drill Hall Library were both joint winners of the Building Renovation category of the Kent Design Awards.

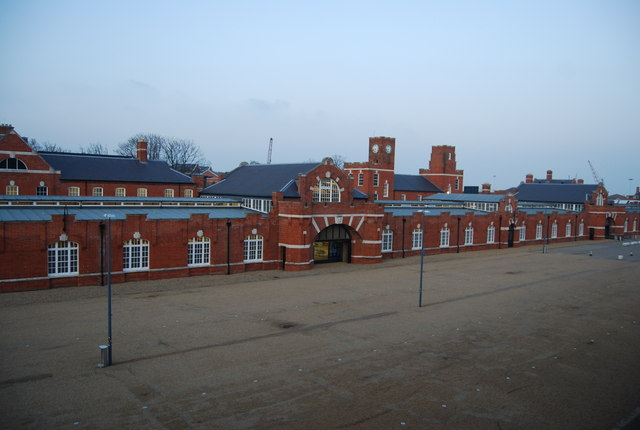
Another view of the Drill Hall.

In 2012, the library opened the Archibald Hay Mess (named after the youngest naval rating killed in the bombing in 1917 – see above), a cafe and place for students to eat within the library.
