= Lower Leas Coastal Park =

Park in Folkestone, Kent, England

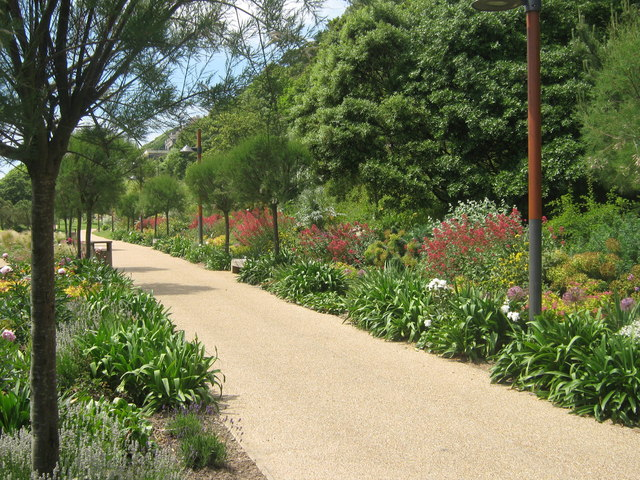
- Flower borders in the formal zone of the park
- Interactive map of Lower Leas Coastal Park
- Coordinates: 51°04′32″N 1°10′30″E
- Area: 11 hectares (27 acres)
- Created: 1840s
- Operator: Shepway District Council,
- Status: Open 7 days a week, dawn until dusk
- Website: www.kent.gov.uk/leisure_and_culture/countryside_and_coast/parks_and_open_spaces/country_parks/lower_leas_coastal_park.aspx

Lower Leas Coastal Park Kent (grid reference TR22513550)

Lower Leas Coastal Park is a park located in Folkestone, Kent, England. The park is split into three broad recreational zones, starting at The Leas Lift (on Lower Sandgate Road) and heading west. The formal zone comprises pine avenues and flower gardens, planted for all-year-round interest. The fun zone comprises the large free adventure play area and the amphitheatre. The last area, the wild zone, has been created for a diverse wildlife habitat, with careful management.

== History ==
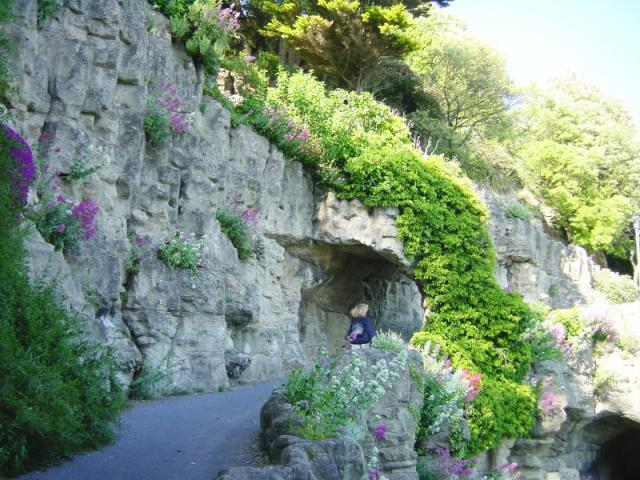
Leas Cliff, Folkestone. Largely artificial cliff-side gardens laid out in Victorian times along the winding path down the cliff from the bandstand on the Leas to the amphitheatre

In 1784, a landslip created a new strip of land between the beach and the cliffside, the length of the coast from Folkestone Harbour to Sandgate. A ribbon of land a few meters wide. In 1828, the Earl of Radnor built a toll road providing an easy route between Folkestone harbour and Sandgate. The original toll road costs were - motor car 10p, motorcycle with sidecar 2 and 1/2 p, motorcycle 2p, bicycle, horse and handcart 1/2 p. The original toll house, built in 1847 (designed by the architect Sydney Smirke) remains within the park. On either side of the toll road, land was cultivated and grazed. Old field boundaries are still used within the park, and the 'Cow Path' is the old drove route from The Leas.

In 1877, a series of paths was constructed. The Ordnance Survey map of 1898 (of the area) shows some of these paths, Including a path from the Leas Shelter on the Upper Leas leading down to the road.

The Leas Lift opened in 1885, to improve access between the seafront and the Upper Leas (of Folkestone). The park and seafront with their new pier, switchback ride (an early form of roller coaster - railway along the promenade), and beach amusements proved to be so popular, that a second lift was added in 1890. The remains of a further lift serving the 'Metropole Hotel' (now a block of apartments) can still be seen (on the Upper Leas), and yet another lift connected the western end of the Leas with Sandgate.

In 1913, the area then known as Leas Cliff was leased by the Radnor Estate to the local corporation, to be used mainly for a park, but the estate still kept the tolls from the toll road. In the park, tea rooms, shelters and woodland walks were provided among the newly planted holm oaks (Quercus ilex) and pine trees so that people could “take the air”.

The 'Zig Zag Path' was built in 1921 as a new attraction and to provide work for the unemployed. This also leads down from the Upper Leas to the park and seafront. The cliff-face and grottoes along the path, are entirely artificial, as they are built from waste material and coated in special cement called Pulhamite after its creator James Pulham. The path is now a listed structure.

The Leas Cliff Hall was opened in 1927 as a replacement for a much smaller concert room called the 'Leas Shelter'. The opening by Prince Henry was broadcast live to the nation by the BBC.

In 1973, due to a lack of traffic on the toll road, the Radnor Estate closed the route to traffic and sold the land to the council. In 1980, the empty toll house was sold to private ownership.

== Coastal Park ==
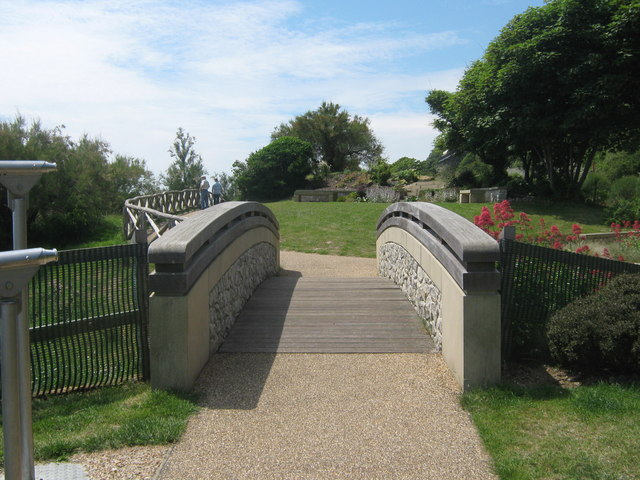
Footbridge in the Formal Zone of the Park

In May 2000, the first phase of the £1.2 million 11-hectare Coastal Park was opened by celebrity weatherman Ian McCaskill. The park regeneration was funded by SEEDA, Shepway District Council and the European Union.

In 2003, Phase II was funded by a £1.4 million grant by the Heritage Lottery Fund of the National Lottery. This provided funding for ground works to be carried out in February 2005. Then planting of the pine avenues, flower gardens and picnic sites could take place. Then park furniture and information signs were erected. In May 2006, this phase of the park was officially opened.

This also included a stone labyrinth designed by Clare Danstead for Shepway District Council for the park in May 2008. 'As a contribution to peace and harmony within the ever-changing environment and community of Folkestone. The labyrinth is a uni-cursal pathway leading to a centre and back out again. This is used as a form of walking meditation or prayer.

During 2007, the Coastal Park received four awards, including the Green Flag, best regional and best overall Regeneration Project from the Royal Town Planning Institute 2007 and winner in the Landscape category of the 2007 Kent Design Awards.

In 2008, an International Sculpture Triennial took place in Folkestone, with some works being displayed in the park. This art initiative was promoted by a board of trustees including Roger De Haan, Dr Stephen Deuchar (Former Director of Tate Britain), Timothy Llewellyn (Director of the Henry Moore Foundation and the Viscount of Folkestone).

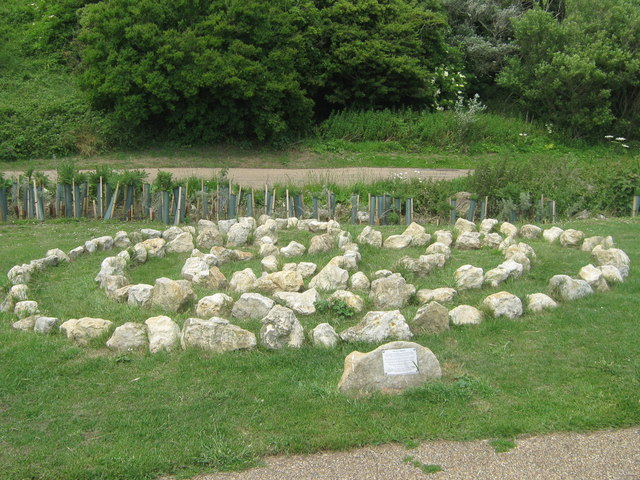
Stone Labyrinth

== Other park notes ==
National Cycle Route 2 runs along the Lower Sandgate Road (through the park) and cyclists are asked to dismount through the play area during busy periods.

On the promenade beside the seafront is a small seasonal-opening cafe (the Mermaid Cafe).
