= Universities at Medway =

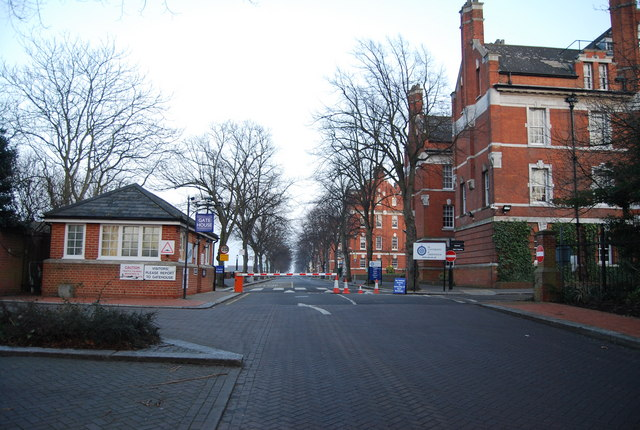
- Gate House, Greenwich University
- Type: Tri-partite collaboration
- Established: 2004
- Students: c. 10,000
- Location: Chatham, Medway, England
- Campus: Urban
- Website: medway.ac.uk

The Universities at Medway is a tri-partite collaboration between the University of Greenwich, the University of Kent and Canterbury Christ Church University, based at a shared campus in Chatham Maritime, South East England. Established in 2004, the campus occupies the former HMS Pembroke naval barracks, built between 1897 and 1902 on the cleared site of Chatham Convict Prison, within the wider 340-acre Chatham Maritime development, a former Royal Navy site redeveloped from 1999.

== Site ==
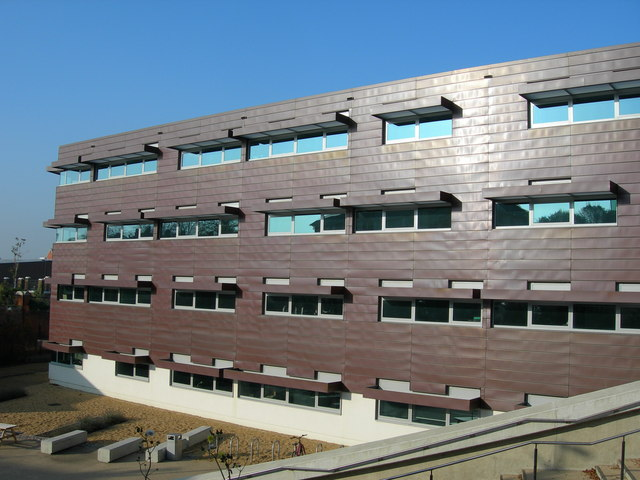
Medway Building

The historic HMS Pembroke barracks buildings, which form a part of the World Heritage Site application for Chatham Dockyard and its Defences, are the heart of the campus.

In 2007, the Pilkington Building (former Canteen Building, now Refectory, lecture theatre and other offices) and the Drill Hall Library were both joint winners of the Building Renovation category of the Kent Design Awards.

The Medway Building at the University of Kent as part of the Universities at Medway campus, was nominated for Best Public Building at the 2010 Kent Design Awards.

== Departments ==
The following subjects are taught on campus:

- University of Greenwich School of Science;
- University of Greenwich School of Engineering;
- University of Greenwich School of Health and Social Care;
- University of Greenwich School of Business and Computing
- Natural Resources Institute;
- Medway School of Pharmacy;
- University of Kent School of Sport and Exercise Sciences;
- Kent Business School (Historic Dockyard site)
- Kent School of Computing
- University of Kent School of Social Policy, Sociology and Social Research (SSPSSR);
- University of Kent Centre for Journalism;
- University of Kent Centre of Music and Audio Technology (Historic Dockyard site)

== Library ==
The universities share use of the Grade II listed Drill Hall Library.
