= HM Prison Canterbury =

Former prison in Canterbury, England

Coordinates: 51.2781°N 1.0918°E

HMP Canterbury
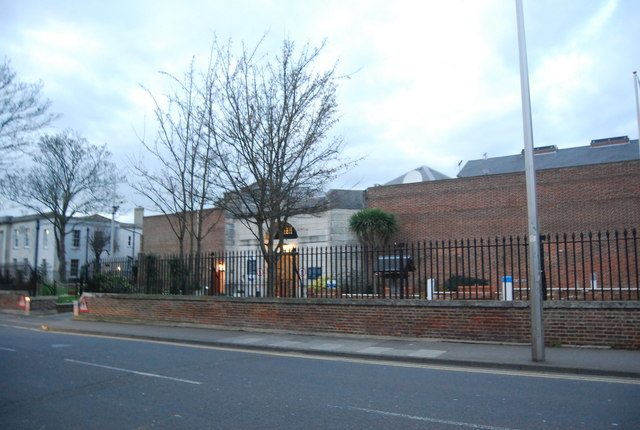
- Entrance to HM Prison Canterbury
- Interactive map of HMP Canterbury
- Location: Canterbury, Kent
- Status: Closed
- Security class: Foreign Nationals
- Population: 314 (August 2008)
- Opened: 1808
- Closed: 2013
- Managed by: HM Prison Services

HMP Canterbury is a former prison in Canterbury, Kent, England. The prison was operated by Her Majesty's Prison Service. The former prison site was bought by Canterbury Christ Church University in April 2014.

== History ==
The prison originated as a county gaol in 1808 and served as a Home Office archive during the First World War. After a time as a Naval Detention Centre during the Second World War, the prison reopened in 1946 as a local prison to serve the courts of Kent. In 2002 it became a category C training prison and in 2006 a foreign nationals prison.

In 2003 Canterbury Prison was highlighted by the Prison Reform Trust as being one of the most overcrowded prisons in the country, claiming that Canterbury was overpopulated 57%. Two years later the Howard League for Penal Reform criticised the prison for its high rates of suicides amongst inmates.

In 2007 Canterbury Prison was converted to hold only foreign national prisoners in the UK. This was to allow a centralisation of specialised immigration and language services for foreign prisoners, as well as to allow dedicated immigration officials to work on the deportation of as many inmates as possible (on completion of their sentence).

In 2008 the Princess Royal visited Canterbury as part of celebrations marking the 200th anniversary of the prison.

On 10 January 2013, the Ministry of Justice announced that Canterbury was one of six prisons that would close. The prison formally closed on 31 March 2013 and was put up for sale in March 2014. In April it was announced that Canterbury Christ Church University had bought the former prison site, and is consulting on using the site for student accommodation for its North Holmes Campus.

== Notable former inmates ==
- Michael Stone
- Silvino Francisco
- Ronnie and Reggie Kray
- Salman Butt
- Mohammad Asif
