= Park Wood, Maidstone =

Suburb of Maidstone, Kent, England

Coordinates: 51°14′27″N 0°33′13″E

Park Wood is a suburb of Maidstone, Kent.

== History ==
Before the Second World War most of the area around the village of Park Wood was mainly woodland and fields which made up Park Wood farm and nearby Brishing Court Farm among others, on the south east extremity of Maidstone in Kent, England. Park Wood village was redeveloped originally around a large playing field where Heather House now stands.

In 2006, part of the area was redeveloped into Wallis Fields, and new housing and shops have been built in the area since then following the demolition of the old Park Wood Parade.

The population of the ward of Park Wood in Maidstone is rapidly growing, and now includes two new housing developments. One is known as Langley Park off the A274 Sutton Road at Park Wood's eastern border. The other is the Redrow Homes development also along this road. The ward of Park Wood extends from Langley Park along the A274 westward towards Maidstone town centre as far as the Kent Police Headquarters.

According to some local residents, Parkwood is also referred to as "West Leeds" to increase property values.

In 2012, Rosemary Gardens won a Kent Design Award in the Major Residential category.

== Amenities ==
There is also a large industrial estate off and along Bircholt Road with a varied selection of businesses. The Parkwood Trading Estate was established about mid 1950s and is still growing. It contains a variety of both large and small businesses.

There is also a much smaller industrial estate known as Haslemere Industrial Estate, also off the A274 Sutton Road.

The population of the Park Wood Ward of Maidstone Borough Council in 2016 is 6,603.
