= Task Force 91 =

Task Force 91 was a United States Navy task force.

On 1 May 1945, it consisted of Alaskan Sea Frontier Forces (established on 15 April 1944) under Rear Admiral R. F. Wood USA, part of North Pacific Force under Vice Admiral Frank Fletcher.

== Korean War ==
Royal Navy Admiral William Andrewes commanded blockade and covering force - Task Force 91 - for the Inchon Landing during the Korean War.
