= HMS Pembroke =

Nine ships and a number of shore establishments of the Royal Navy have been named HMS Pembroke.

== Ships ==
- English ship Pembroke (1655) was a 28-gun fifth rate launched in 1655 and lost in a collision off Portland in 1667.
- HMS Pembroke (1690) was a 32-gun fifth rate launched in 1690, captured by the French in 1694 and subsequently wrecked.
- HMS Pembroke (1694) was a 60-gun fourth rate launched in 1694 and captured by the French in 1709. She was recaptured in 1711. In 1713 was purchased in Genoa by Spain.
- HMS Pembroke (1710) was a 54-gun fourth rate launched in 1710 and broken up in 1726.
- HMS Pembroke (1733) was a 60-gun fourth rate launched in 1733. She foundered in 1745, but was raised and wrecked off the East Indies in 1749.
- HMS Pembroke (1757) was a 60-gun fourth rate launched in 1757, hulked in 1776 before being broken-up in 1793.
- HMS Pembroke (1812) was a 74-gun third rate launched in 1812. She was converted to a screw ship in 1855, transferred to the Coastguard in 1858, and used as a base ship from 1887. She was renamed HMS Forte as a receiving hulk in 1890, and was sold in 1905.
- HMS Pembroke was a 101-gun screw propelled first rate launched in 1859 as HMS Duncan. She was renamed HMS Pembroke on her transferral to harbour service in 1890, renamed HMS Tenedos II in 1905 and was sold in 1910.
- HMS Pembroke (M107) is a Sandown-class minehunter launched in 1997; as of 2023 planned for decommissioning and transfer to Romania

== Shore establishments ==
- HMS Pembroke was the name given to a shore barracks at Chatham. It was commissioned in 1878, moved ashore in 1903 and was paid off in 1983. The buildings, designed by Sir Henry Pilkington, now house the Universities at Medway.
- A number of ships were renamed Pembroke while serving as base and depot ships for the establishment:
  - HMS Pembroke (1812) was the original base ship between 1873 and 1890 (which gave the shore base its name)
  - HMS Duncan was HMS Pembroke from 1890 until 1905.
  - HMS Trent was HMS Pembroke from 1905 until 1917.
  - HMS Nymphe was HMS Pembroke from 1917 until 1920.
  - HMS Achilles was HMS Pembroke from 1919 until 1923.
  - HMS Prince Rupert was HMS Pembroke for several months in 1922.
  - Daniel Fearall was HMS Pembroke between 1922 until 1939.
- There were a number of other Pembrokes established across the country during the twentieth century.
  - HMS Pembroke I - accounting base at Chatham between 1940 and 1960.
  - HMS Pembroke II - Royal Naval Air Station at Eastchurch between 1913 and 1918.
  - HMS Pembroke II - accounting base at Chatham between 1940 and 1957.
  - HMS Pembroke III - accounting base at London and outstations between 1942 and 1952.
  - HMS Pembroke IV - accounting base at Chatham between 1919 and 1920, and the Nore between 1939 and 1961.
  - HMS Pembroke V - naval base at Dover between 1919 and 1923, secret base at Bletchley Park between 1941 and 1945, and the name for WRNS personnel in London between 1945 and 1946.
  - HMS Pembroke VI - accounting section at Chatham in 1919.
  - HMS Pembroke VII - depot ship for auxiliary patrols at Grimsby between 1919 and 1921.
  - HMS Pembroke VIII - HM Naval Base, Immingham and as the flag ship of the Commanding Officer, Humber Area on the Humber between 1920 and 1921.
  - HMS Pembroke X - headquarters of the Royal Navy Patrol Service at Lowestoft between 1939 and 1940.

== See also ==
- HMS Pembroke Prize
- HMS Pembroke Castle
