= Claire Ozanne =

British insect ecologist

- Born: August 1963 (age 63)
- Education: University of Oxford (BA, DPhil)
- Known for: Vice-Chancellor and Principal of Canterbury Christ Church University
- Scientific career
- Workplaces: University of Roehampton, Heythrop College, University of London, SOAS University of London Liverpool Hope University

Claire Margaret Philippa Ozanne (born August 1963) is a British insect ecologist, who serves as the Vice-Chancellor and Principal of Canterbury Christ Church University.

== Education and career ==
Ozanne was educated at the University of Oxford where she gained a B.A. and then a D.Phil. in Agriculture and Forest Sciences, graduating in 1991.

She was Head of Biological & Health Sciences and also Assistant Dean (Learning & Teaching) and from 2010 to 2020 was Vice Provost (Academic Partnerships and International) at the University of Roehampton.

Between 2017 and 2019 Ozanne was Principal of Heythrop College, University of London, she was appointed to oversee the college's 'orderly' closure.

In September 2020 she moved to SOAS as Deputy Director and Provost.

In 2023 Ozanne became Professor of Ecology and Vice-Chancellor & Rector of Liverpool Hope University.

In April 2026 Ozanne became the Vice-Chancellor and Principal of Canterbury Christ Church University.

== Research ==
Ozanne's research looks at insects in habitats affected by human activities, in particular in temperate and tropical forests. She has surveyed insects all around the world, including in Ethiopia which she talked about to Brett Westwood on the BBC Radio 4's Saving Species programme.

She helped found the Global Canopy Programme and has written several book chapters on insects on forests:

- Chapter 4 Sampling methods for forest understory vegetation, & Chapter 7 Techniques and methods for sampling canopy vegetation, in Insect sampling in forest ecosystems, edited by Simon R Leather, published by Blackwell in 2005.
- Chapter 14 Collecting arthropods and arthropod remains for primate studies, in Field and Laboratory Methods in Primatology: A Practical Guide, edited by Joanna M. Setchell & Deborah J. Curtis, published by Cambridge University Press in 2012.
- Chapter 10 Canopies and climate change, in Treetops at Risk: Challenges of Global Canopy Ecology and Conservation, edited by Margaret Lowman, Soubadra Devy & T. Ganesh, published by Springer in 2013.

== Awards and honours ==
Ozanne is a principal fellow of the Higher Education Academy.
