= Royal Naval Barracks, Chatham =

Coordinates: 51°23′54″N 0°32′23″E

Royal Naval Barracks, Chatham (HMS Pembroke)
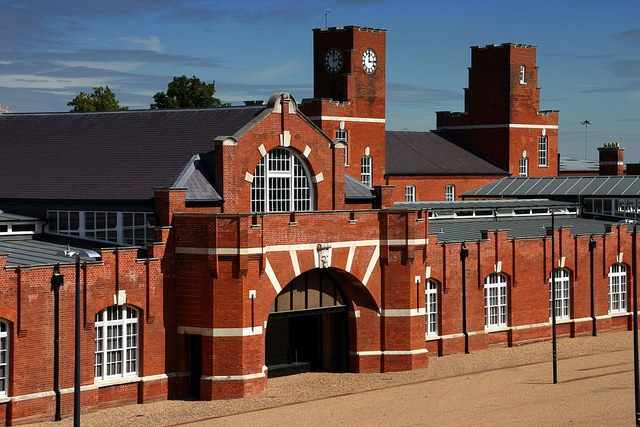
- Former drill hall with offices behind
- Active: 1891. formal 1902–1961
- Country: United Kingdom
- Branch: Royal Navy
- Type: Reserve Fleet
- Role: manning and training facility
- Part of: Royal Navy
- Garrison/HQ: Chatham, Kent, UK

The Royal Naval Barracks, Chatham, also known as HMS Pembroke, was a UK naval barracks that was built between the Victorian Steam Yard and Brompton Barracks from 1897 to 1902. It was built on the site of a prison built in 1853 to house over 1,000 convicts, with the intention that they would be used to build the Dockyard extension.

== Background ==
During the Age of Sail, the Royal Navy manned its ships either by recruitment or impressment; crew were retained for as long as they were needed and then usually dismissed when their ship was paid off at the end of a voyage or campaign. The introduction of Long Term Service in 1853, however, prompted the Navy to look at providing more permanent quarters for seamen in home waters. At first, they were almost invariably housed in hulks; it was only towards the end of the century that purpose-built barracks began to be constructed at each of the three principal Royal Navy Dockyards: Chatham, Devonport and Portsmouth. These barracks were designed to provide not just accommodation but also recreation and training facilities for men who were waiting to be appointed to ships.

== History ==
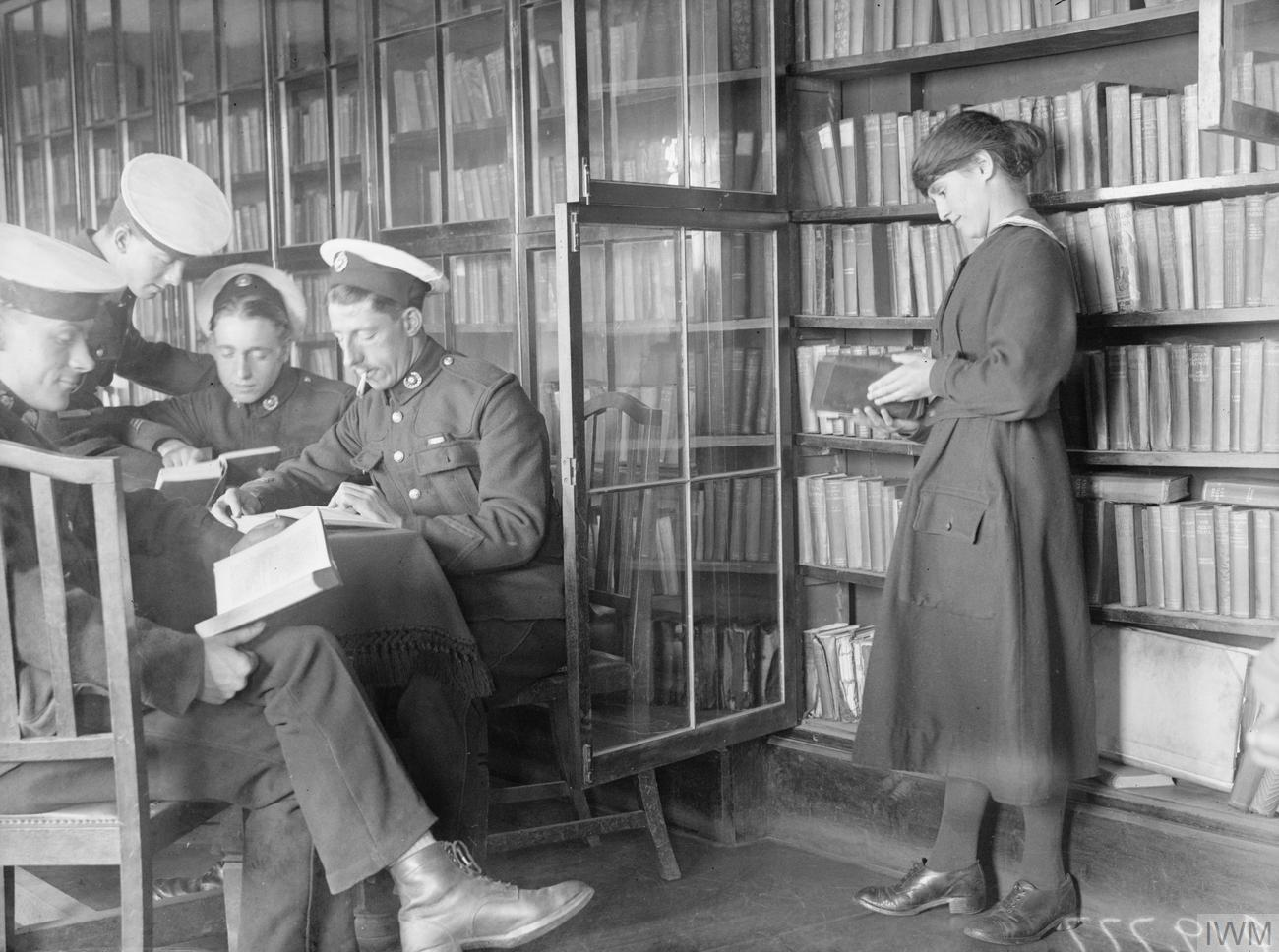
The library at the barracks during World War I

Designed by Henry Pilkington, construction of the Royal Naval Barracks began in 1897 and was completed by December 1902. By the beginning of the First World War, Chatham was one of the Royal Navy's three ‘manning ports’ – together with Plymouth and Portsmouth—manned by men allocated to the Chatham Division. This role continued until the advent of central manning in 1956.

In September 1917, the barracks Drill Hall (which was being used as overflow accommodation) suffered a direct hit from two bombs, which killed over 130 men. In 1942, King George VI made a visit to Medway and HMS Pembroke, the Royal Naval Barracks. After the war Chatham became home to the reserve, or standby fleet.

In 1957, the barracks and gunnery school were closed due to the local port divisions being replaced; however in 1959 the barracks re-opened as the Royal Naval Supply School, who trained staff in supply and secretarial work. When the Commander-in-Chief, The Nore, the regional operational commander appointment, was discontinued in March 1961, the barracks were being used as an accommodation centre for the re-fitting crews of the dockyard. The Drill Shed and Canteen were being used by the Dockyard. In 1970, all Naval establishments in Chatham were to be combined and known as HM Navy Base, under one officer 'Flag Officer, Medway and Port Admiral'. With the closure of the Dockyard and Naval Base in 1984, HMS Pembroke was also decommissioned; the barracks gates were finally closed on 31 March 1984.

== List of Commodores-in-Command ==
Post holders included:

- Captain Ernest Rice: July 1891 – July 1893
- Captain Swinton C. Holland: July 1893 – July 1896
- Captain Robert F. Hammick: July 1896 – October 1898
- Captain Angus Macleod: October 1898 – May 1901
- Captain Reginald C. Prothero: May 1901 – October 1902
- Captain Lewis E. Wintz: October 1902 – July 1904
- Commodore Frederick G.Stopford: July 1904 – May 1907
- Commodore Edward E. Bradford: May 1907 – December 1908
- Commodore Ernest C.T. Troubridge: December 1908 – February 1910
- Commodore Cecil F. Thursby: February 1910 – August 1911
- Commodore Seymour E. Erskine: August 1911 – April 1913
- Commodore Ernest F. A. Gaunt: April 1913 – August 1915
- Rear-Admiral Seymour E.Erskine: August 1915 – July 1918
- Commodore Harry L. de E. Skipwith: July 1918 – August 1920
- Commodore Gerald W.Vivian: August 1920 – June 1921
- Commodore Louis C.S.Woollcombe: June 1921 – May 1922
- Commodore Alexander V.Campbell: May 1922 – November 1923
- Commodore Eric J.A.Fullerton: November 1923 – December 1925
- Commodore Geoffrey Hopwood: December 1925 – December 1927
- Commodore Hugh S. Shipway: December 1927 – November 1929
- Commodore Arthur L. Snagge: November 1929 – July 1931
- Commodore Andrew B. Cunningham: July 1931 – December 1932
- Commodore Robert C. Davenport: January 1933 – July 1935
- Commodore John C. Tovey: January 1935 – July 1937
- Commodore Stuart S. Bonham-Carter: July 1937 – March 1939
- Commodore Robert L. Burnett: March 1939 – November 1940
- Commodore R. S. Gresham Nicholson: November 1940 – August 1943
- Commodore Angus M. B. Cunninghame Graham: August 1943 – January 1945
- Commodore Marcel H.A. Kelsey: January 1945 – February 1946
- Rear-Admiral Basil C. B. Brooke: February 1946 – February 1948
- Commodore John A.S. Eccles: February 1948 – October 1949
- Commodore Peter G.L. Cazalet: October 1949 – October 1950
- Commodore Gerald V. Gladstone: October 1950 – May 1952
- Commdore Geoffrey Thistleton-Smith: May 1952 – November 1953 (later V.Adm.)
- Commodore Peter L. Collard: November 1953 – November 1955
- Commodore Hugh C.B. Coleridge: November 1955 – May 1957
- Commodore John F.D. Bush: May 1957 – March 1959
- Commodore Lionel W.L. Argles: March 1959 – March 1961

== Sources ==
- Coad, Jonathan (2013). Support for the Fleet: Architecture and Engineering of the Royal Navy's Bases 1700–1914. Swindon, UK: English Heritage. ISBN 978-18480-2-055-9.
