= HMS Theseus =

There have been a number of warships in the Royal Navy that have borne the name HMS Theseus, from a wooden frigate to a light fleet carrier. The name comes from Theseus, a king of ancient Athens.

- HMS Theseus (1786) was a 74-gun third-rate ship-of-the-line, launched in 1786. She took part in the Battle of the Nile and the Battle of the Basque Roads in 1809. She was broken up at Chatham in 1814.
- HMS Theseus (1892) was a protected cruiser of the Edgar class and was launched in 1892. She was involved in World War I and scrapped in 1921.
- HMS Theseus (R64) was a Colossus-class light fleet carrier that was built in 1944 and was involved in the Korean War and the Suez Crisis. She was scrapped in 1962.
