= HMS Pembroke (1710) =

Ship of the line of the Royal Navy

History

Great Britain
- Name: HMS Pembroke
- Builder: Lock, Plymouth Dockyard
- Launched: 18 May 1710
- Fate: Broken up, 1726

General characteristics
- Class & type: 1706 Establishment 50-gun fourth rate ship of the line
- Tons burthen: 703 bm
- Length: 130 ft (39.6 m) (gundeck)
- Beam: 35 ft (10.7 m)
- Depth of hold: 14 ft (4.3 m)
- Propulsion: Sails
- Sail plan: Full-rigged ship
- Armament: 50 guns: Gundeck: 22 × 18-pdrs; Upper gundeck: 22 × 9-pdrs; Quarterdeck: 4 × 6-pdrs; Forecastle: 2 × 6-pdrs

HMS Pembroke was a 50-gun fourth rate ship of the line of the Royal Navy, built at Plymouth Dockyard to the 1706 Establishment, and launched on 18 May 1710.

Pembroke served until 1726, when she was broken up.
