= 5th Cruiser Squadron =

- Active: 1907–1914, 1939-1946
- Country: United Kingdom
- Allegiance: British Empire
- Branch: Royal Navy

Commanders
- Notable commanders: Rear-Admiral Cecil Burney

The 5th Cruiser Squadron and also known as Cruiser Force D was a formation of cruisers of the British Royal Navy from 1907 to 1915 and then again from 1939 to 1946.

== History ==
=== First formation ===
The squadron was first established in 1907, it was attached to the Nore Division in home waters between March 1908 and February 1909 the squadron was assigned to the Home Fleet. It was then allocated to the Atlantic Fleet in April 1909 until April 1912. From May 1912 to July 1914 it was seconded to the Second Fleet. It was disbanded just before the start of World War I.

=== Second formation ===
The squadron reformed in April 1939, and then it came under the Commander-in-Chief, China until 1942. The squadron was then reassigned to the Eastern Fleet until October 1944. It was then attached to the East Indies Fleet. It continued to serve in the Far East Fleet, with its admiral also wearing the flag of Second-in-Command of the Fleet, until the late 1950s-early 1960s.

After the outbreak of the Korean War in June 1950, William Andrewes was promoted to vice admiral on 1 December 1950. On 17 December 1950 Andrewes was appointed commander of the 5th Cruiser Squadron and Flag Officer Second in Command Far East Fleet, flying his flag in the light cruiser Belfast. he commanded British and Commonwealth Naval Forces, with the carrier Theseus as his flagship. He had two aircraft carriers available at any one time which he worked in eighteen-day cycles. and then Task Force 95 (comprising all Blockade and Escort ships in Korean waters, affiliated with the United Nations Command) in 1951.
