= Siddell =

Siddell is a surname of Northern English origin, a variant of Siddall. Notable people with the surname include:

- Emily Siddell (born 1971), New Zealand artist
- Kevin Siddell (1924–2004), New Zealand-born Australian pianist, composer, and public service official
- Peter Siddell (1935–2011), New Zealand artist
- Sylvia Siddell (1941–2011), New Zealand painter, etcher, and screen-printer, based in Auckland

== See also ==
- Siddle, another surname
- Siddells, another surname
