= Alan McNicoll =

Senior Royal Australian Navy officer and diplomat

Sir Alan McNicoll
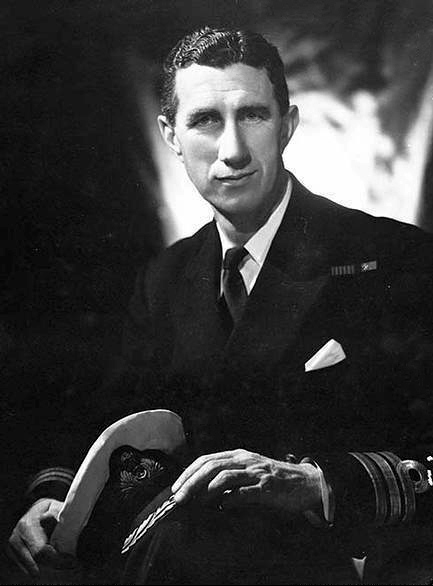
- Commander Alan McNicoll c. mid-1940s
- Born: Alan Wedel Ramsay McNicoll; 3 April 1908; Hawthorn, Victoria
- Died: 11 October 1987 (aged 79); Canberra, Australian Capital Territory
- Spouse(s): Ruth Timmins (m. 1937; div. 1956) Frances Chadwick (m. 1957)
- Relatives: Brigadier General Sir Walter McNicoll (father); Major General Ronald McNicoll (brother)
- Military career
- Allegiance: Australia
- Branch: Royal Australian Navy
- Service years: 1922–1968
- Rank: Vice Admiral
- Commands: Chief of Naval Staff (1965–1968); HM Australian Fleet (1962–1964); HMAS Australia (1952–1954); Deputy Chief of Naval Staff (1951–1952); HMAS Warramunga (1950); HMAS Shoalhaven (1949–1950)
- Conflicts: Second World War; Battle of the Mediterranean; Arctic convoys; Italian Campaign; Operation Husky; Indonesia–Malaysia confrontation; Vietnam War
- Awards: Knight Commander of the Order of the British Empire; Companion of the Order of the Bath; George Medal; Commander of the Order of Orange-Nassau (Netherlands)
- Other work: Australian Ambassador to Turkey (1968–1973)

Vice Admiral Sir Alan Wedel Ramsay McNicoll, KBE, CB, GM (3 April 1908 – 11 October 1987) was a senior officer in the Royal Australian Navy (RAN) and a diplomat. Born in Melbourne, he entered the Royal Australian Naval College at the age of thirteen and graduated in 1926. Following training and staff appointments in Australia and the United Kingdom, he was attached to the Royal Navy at the outbreak of the Second World War. As torpedo officer of the 1st Submarine Flotilla in the Mediterranean theatre, McNicoll was decorated with the George Medal in 1941 for disarming enemy ordnance. He served aboard HMS King George V from 1942, sailing in support of several Arctic convoys and taking part in the Allied invasion of Sicily. McNicoll was posted for staff duties with the Admiralty from September 1943 and was involved in the planning of the Normandy landings. He returned to Australia in October 1944.

McNicoll was made executive officer of HMAS Hobart in September 1945. Advanced to captain in 1949, he successively commanded HMAS Shoalhaven and HMAS Warramunga before being transferred to the Navy Office in July 1950. In 1952, McNicoll chaired the planning committee for the British nuclear tests on the Montebello Islands, and was appointed commanding officer of HMAS Australia. He commanded the ship for two years before it was sold off for scrap, at which point he returned to London to attend the Imperial Defence College in 1955. He occupied staff positions in London and Canberra before being posted to the Naval Board as Chief of Personnel in 1960. This was followed by a term as Flag Officer Commanding HM Australian Fleet.

McNicoll's career culminated with his promotion to vice admiral and appointment as First Naval Member and Chief of Naval Staff (CNS) in February 1965. As CNS, McNicoll had to cope with significant morale and recruitment issues occasioned by the February 1964 collision between HMAS Melbourne and Voyager and, furthermore, oversaw an extensive modernisation of the Australian fleet. In 1966, he presided over the RAN contribution to the Vietnam War, and it was during his tenure that the Australian White Ensign was created. McNicoll retired from the RAN in 1968 and was appointed as the inaugural Australian Ambassador to Turkey. He served in the diplomatic post for five years, then retired to Canberra. McNicoll died in 1987 at the age of 79.

== Early life and career ==
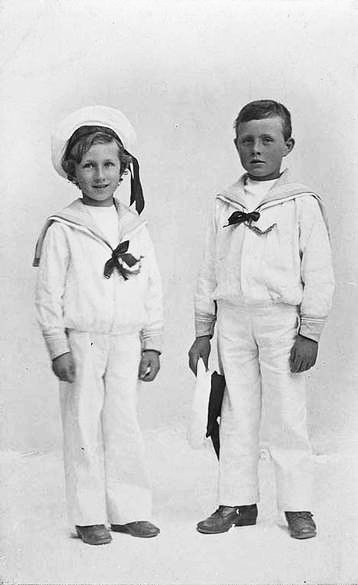
Brothers Alan and Ronald McNicoll in 1914 or 1915

Alan McNicoll was born in the Melbourne suburb of Hawthorn, Victoria, on 3 April 1908. He was the second of five sons of Walter McNicoll, a school teacher and Militia officer, and Hildur (née Wedel Jarlsberg). The young McNicoll was of noble Norwegian descent through his mother. He was initially educated at Scotch College, Melbourne, before the family moved to Goulburn, from where he was sent to attend The Scots College in Sydney. On 1 January 1922, at the age of thirteen, McNicoll entered the Royal Australian Naval College at Jervis Bay. Described as "urbane and studious", he performed well both academically and in sport, ultimately placing first in seamanship, history and English. On graduation in 1926, McNicoll was posted to Britain for service and further training with the Royal Navy.

Advanced to acting sub-lieutenant in September 1928, McNicoll's appointment to the United Kingdom concluded the following year, at which point he returned to Australia and was initially posted to the land base HMAS Cerberus. He was attached to HMAS Penguin soon after, before being assigned for duties with HMAS Australia. In his Lieutenants' Examinations in 1929, McNicoll achieved 1st Class Certificates in all of his subjects and was awarded a prize of £10 as a result. He was promoted to lieutenant in July 1930, with seniority from 1 April that year. Completing a twelve-month posting aboard HMAS Canberra between 1932 and 1933, McNicoll decided to specialise as a torpedo officer and returned to the United Kingdom in order to undertake the long course at the Royal Naval College in Dartmouth. While in the UK, McNicoll wrote and published Sea Voices, a book of poems centred on naval life.

McNicoll's detachment to the Royal Navy was terminated in 1935 on his graduation from Dartmouth, and he returned to Australia. Over the next three years, he saw service in HMAS Canberra, HMAS Sydney and Cerberus, advancing to lieutenant commander on 1 April 1938. On 18 May 1937, McNicoll wed Ruth Timmins at St Stephen's Church of England at Brighton. From March 1939, McNicoll was once again seconded to the Royal Navy, receiving a posting to the torpedo school HMS Vernon; he was serving in Vernon on the outbreak of the Second World War. While residing at Portsmouth, McNicoll and his wife had their first child, a son named Ian, in June that year. Ian died when one week old. The couple later had two more sons, Guy and Anthony, and a daughter, Deborah.

== Second World War ==
On 14 September 1939, eleven days after the outbreak of the Second World War, McNicoll was posted to HMS Victory, the flagship of Admiral Sir William James, the Commander-in-Chief, Portsmouth. In April 1940, McNicoll was transferred to the light cruiser HMS Fiji as a member of the ship's commissioning crew. During McNicoll's time aboard the ship, it was severely damaged by a torpedo in operations on 1 September and barely made it back to harbour. McNicoll ultimately served on Fiji for six months before being attached to HMS Medway, a submarine depot ship stationed at Alexandria, Egypt, in October 1940. In this post he was made torpedo officer of the 1st Submarine Flotilla operating in the Mediterranean theatre. In addition to his standard duties, McNicoll was regularly involved in rendering safe captured enemy ordnance. On one such occasion, he was tasked with disarming the captured Italian submarine Galileo Galilei, which entailed removing the inertia pistols from eight torpedoes that had badly corroded. As a consequence of his "gallant and undaunted devotion to duty" in this action, McNicoll was awarded the George Medal and presented a Commander-in-Chief's Commendation. His decoration was promulgated in a supplement to the London Gazette on 8 July 1941.

In April 1942, McNicoll transferred to the battleship HMS King George V and served as Squadron Torpedo Officer. As part of the Home Fleet, King George V provided support to several Arctic convoys throughout the conflict. From April to May 1942, King George V formed up as a support component to Convoy PQ 15, the first for McNicoll. While sailing in thick fog on 1 May, King George V collided with the destroyer HMS Punjabi after the latter crossed under the bow of the battleship. Punjabi was sliced in two during the collision, and sank with heavy loss of life. Several depth charges were also ignited on the damaged stern of King George V during the accident. King George V was patched up at Seidisfjord, before sailing to Gladstone Dock, Liverpool, to receive repairs.

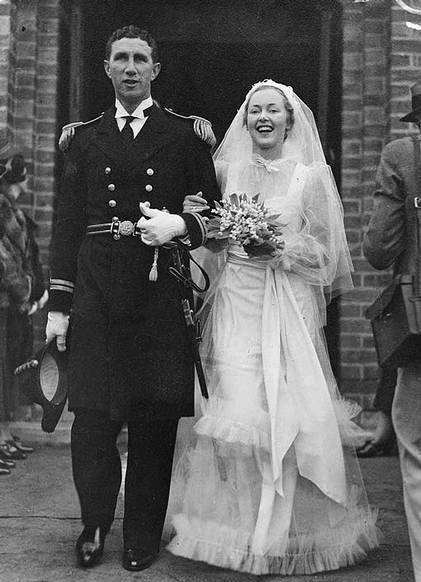
McNicoll and Ruth Timmins on their wedding day, 18 May 1937

In December 1942, HMS King George V deployed in support of Convoy JW 51A, the first Russian convoy to sail direct from the United Kingdom without stopping at Iceland. The journey was completed without incident. On receiving word of the German naval attack on Convoy JW 51B in what became known as the Battle of the Barents Sea, King George V was dispatched along with nine other ships from Scapa Flow on 31 December to provide cover for the returning Convoy RA 51 and to attempt to catch the German ships engaged in the previous assault. The German ships were ultimately not encountered, and RA 51 was returned safely. King George V later provided a covering force for two further convoys during early 1943, before being transferred to the Mediterranean during May in preparation for Operation Husky, the Allied invasion of Sicily. Promoted to commander on 30 June 1943, McNicoll took part in the Sicilian invasion the following month, with King George V serving as part of the covering force. Prior to the invasion, King George V, along with HMS Howe, had executed a bombardment of Trapani and the islands of Favignana and Levanzo on the night of 11–12 July, as part of a deception suggesting landings on the west coast of Sicily.

McNicoll was briefly reposted to HMS Victory on 1 September 1943, before being transferred for staff duties with the Admiralty in London the following month. He completed a year-long attachment with the Admiralty, and was involved in the planning for the Normandy landings. On 15 February 1944, he attended an investiture ceremony at Buckingham Palace, where he was formally presented his George Medal by King George VI. McNicoll returned to Australia and was attached to the staff of HMAS Cerberus in October 1944; he spent the remainder of the war in this post. Up to this period, McNicoll had completed all but five of his years of military service attached to the Royal Navy. McNicoll's three brothers also served in the Second World War: Ronald Ramsay, who ultimately retired with the rank of major general and served in the Korean War, as a colonel with the Royal Australian Engineers; Frederick Oscar Ramsay as a lieutenant in the Royal Australian Navy (RAN); and David Ramsay—who would become an accomplished journalist—as a lieutenant in the 7th Division up to 1944, before spending the remainder of the conflict as a war correspondent for Consolidated Press, in which capacity he covered the Normandy landings.

== Senior command ==
=== Ships' captain ===
McNicoll was appointed executive officer of the light cruiser HMAS Hobart on 16 September 1945, a fortnight after the cessation of hostilities in the Pacific theatre. From November 1945 until July 1947, Hobart spent nine months operating in Japanese waters over three distinct periods as part of the British Commonwealth Occupation Force. The ship was placed in reserve from December 1947, and McNicoll briefly transferred to HMAS Penguin before assuming the post of Director of Plans and Operations at the Navy Office in Melbourne on 6 January 1948. Advanced to captain in June 1949, he was posted two months later to HMAS Shoalhaven, a River-class frigate, as the ship's commanding officer, and was simultaneously placed in charge of the 1st Frigate Squadron. He was appointed an honorary aide-de-camp to the Governor-General of Australia in December for a period of three years. In January 1950, McNicoll transferred to command the destroyer HMAS Warramunga and was subsequently made Captain (D) in control of the 10th Destroyer Squadron.

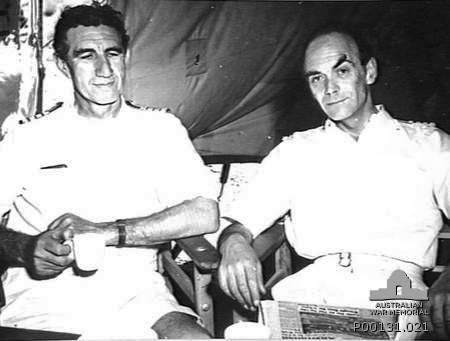
McNicoll with Captain Hutchison of the Royal Navy in October 1952. Both men were liaison officers to the British atomic tests on the Monte Bello Islands.

During McNicoll's tenure as commanding officer of Warramunga, the ship operated in Australian waters as part of the Australia Station, sailing to New Zealand for a visit during March 1950. On the outbreak of the Korean War in June that year, Warramunga was selected as part of the Australian contribution to the conflict. Moreover, the ship was to be attached to a force of five Royal Navy destroyers led by a captain, making it expedient to have the Australian ship commanded by an officer of lower rank; McNicoll was consequently replaced by Commander Otto Becher on 28 July. McNicoll was then posted to the Navy Office to assist in the introduction and co-ordination of National Service in the Australian military in response to the National Service Act 1951. He moved to the land base HMAS Lonsdale in October 1951, on being made Deputy Chief of Naval Staff.

In 1952, McNicoll was appointed chairman of the planning committee for the British nuclear tests on the Montebello Islands, off the coast of Western Australia. Later that year, he was made commanding officer of the heavy cruiser HMAS Australia, a post he held for the next two years. As commander of Australia, McNicoll also served as Chief Staff Officer to the Flag Officer Commanding HM Australian Fleet. HMAS Australia was near the end of its naval service and had been relegated to training duties from 1950. As such, the cruiser was primarily consigned to Australian waters, though a brief trip to New Zealand did occur in October 1953. McNicoll was appointed a Commander of the Order of the British Empire in the 1954 New Year Honours List for his involvement in the British atomic program; he was presented with the decoration three months later by Queen Elizabeth II in a ceremony at Government House, Melbourne.

The year of 1954 was to be HMAS Australia's last in service, with the ship conducting Royal and Vice Regal tasks as some of its final duties. In February and March, HMAS Australia served as part of the escort for the Royal Yacht Gothic during the Australian leg of Queen Elizabeth II's coronation tour. The cruiser was presented with the Gloucester Cup on 25 March as the ship "considered to be foremost in general efficiency, cleanliness, seamanship and technical training" during the year of 1953. As one of the ship's final duties with the Navy, Australia was tasked with transporting Field Marshal Sir William Slim, the Governor-General of Australia, along with his wife and their staff on a cruise around the Coral Sea, the Great Barrier Reef and the Whitsunday Passage. The voyage embarked on 4 May, and two days later Australia fired its 8-inch guns for the final time. While in the Coral Sea, a Dutch naval ship was discovered to be incapacitated off the coast of Hollandia, Netherlands New Guinea, and was consequently towed by Australia to Cairns. McNicoll was appointed a Commander of the Order of Orange-Nassau by Dutch Royal Decree no. 23 of 26 July 1955 for his rescue of the ship.

=== Rise to Chief of Naval Staff ===
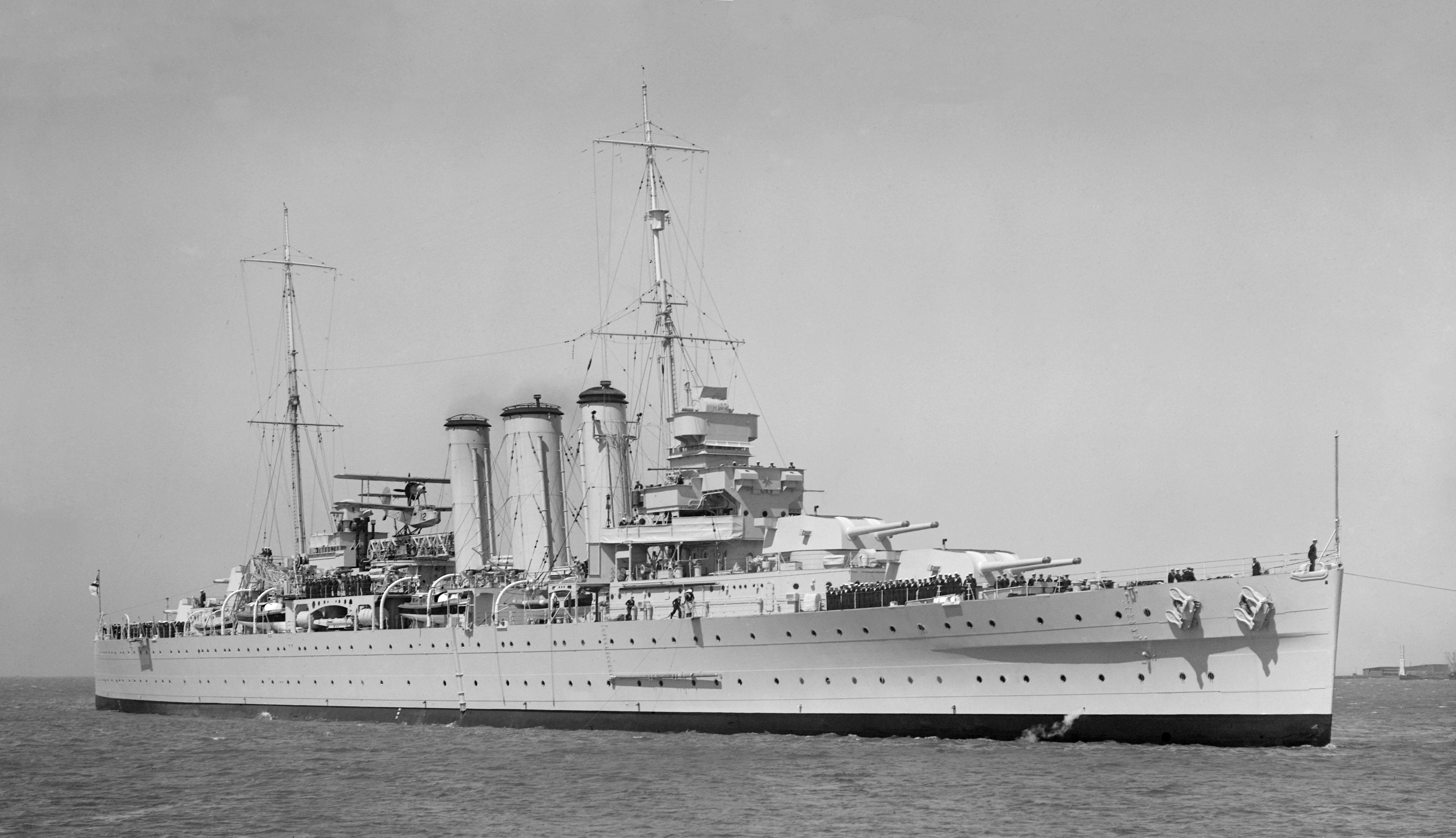
The County-class cruiser, HMAS Australia. Captain Alan McNicoll served as Commanding Officer of Australia from 1952 to 1954.

McNicoll relinquished command of HMAS Australia in July 1954 before the cruiser was paid off and marked for disposal the following month, and he briefly returned to duties at the Navy Office. In November, he embarked for London to attend the Imperial Defence College as part of the 1955 course intake, which signified that he had been marked for senior command. McNicoll and his wife, Ruth, had separated in 1950 and their divorce, which cited adultery as the cause, was finalised in October 1956, while the former was still in London. On 17 May the following year, McNicoll wed Frances Mary Chadwick, a journalist, in the Hampstead register office. Made acting rear admiral in January 1957, McNicoll was appointed as Head of the Australian Joint Service Staff in London. He returned to Australia in February 1958 and was selected to serve as Deputy Secretary (Military) at the Department of Defence; McNicoll's rank was made substantive in July that year.

On 8 January 1960, McNicoll was posted to the Naval Board in Canberra as Second Naval Member and Chief of Personnel. As noted by historian Ian Pfennigwerth, McNicoll held this position at a time in which recruitment and retention in the Navy particularly lagged behind targets. McNicoll was additionally appointed as a trustee of the RAN Relief Trust Fund during this period. Completing his term on the Naval Board, McNicoll was posted as Flag Officer Commanding HM Australian Fleet on 8 January 1962 and hoisted his standard aboard HMAS Melbourne, the flagship of the RAN. The Australian government had designated the role of the RAN to be primarily one of anti-submarine warfare, a posture which McNicoll thought unwise. McNicoll argued that surface and air weapons posed a threat equal to that of submarines toward vessels in modern naval warfare. As such, he campaigned for a contemporary aircraft carrier to replace that of HMAS Melbourne. The Army and Air Force opposed McNicoll's stance, and the government ultimately concluded that there was no strategic requirement for a new carrier in light of agreements contained in the Southeast Asia Treaty Organization. In any event, McNicoll experienced a particularly demanding tenure as Fleet Commander since the RAN was in the process of a complete overhaul of its order of battle and, as a consequence, he had to manage the introduction and deployment into service of six Ton-class minesweepers acquired from the Royal Navy, along with the first batch of Westland Wessex helicopters and modernised afloat support capabilities. Furthermore, McNicoll was charged with the responsibility of ensuring Australian naval commitments to the Far East Strategic Reserve were met.

Rear Admiral Alan McNicoll c.1963

McNicoll's two-year term as Fleet Commander concluded on 6 January 1964, at which point he returned to the Naval Board as Fourth Naval Member and Chief of Supply. However, this post proved short-lived with his appointment as Flag Officer-in-Charge East Australia Area, headquartered at the land base HMAS Kuttabul in Sydney, from June that year. In the 1965 New Year Honours, McNicoll was appointed a Companion of the Order of the Bath.

=== Chief of Naval Staff ===
On 24 February 1965, McNicoll was promoted vice admiral and made Chief of Naval Staff (CNS) in succession to Vice Admiral Sir Hastings Harrington. By virtue of this position, McNicoll was head of the Naval Board and the functional commander of the RAN. McNicoll's term as CNS was characterised by a period of heightened activity for the RAN in light of the Australian commitments to the Indonesia–Malaysia Konfrontasi and the Vietnam War. He furthermore had to oversee an extensive modernisation of the fleet, with the introduction into service of the Perth-class destroyers, Attack-class patrol boats, and the initial batch of Oberon-class submarines. The Fleet Air Arm was also re-equipped with American fixed wing aircraft. Despite these acquisitions, the RAN possessed a rather thin and limited fleet during this period, which McNicoll blamed on past naval planning. He criticised the lack of foresight in earlier decisions that had led to "inconsistencies and inadequate estimating" in the future needs of the RAN, which had consequently left the fleet outdated and minimal. In addition to the RAN's materiel issues, McNicoll faced significant problems with morale and recruitment. A series of mishaps and accidents over the previous decade led to what naval historian Tom Frame termed as "an appreciable erosion of public confidence in the navy's professional standards". The situation intensified following the February 1964 collision between HMAS Melbourne and Voyager. The two subsequent Royal Commissions into the incident subjected the RAN to unprecedented scrutiny and damaged the public perception of its senior leadership. McNicoll had to cope with the turmoil occasioned by these events and concerned himself with the restoration of morale in the Navy.

The tenure of Air Chief Marshal Sir Frederick Scherger as Chairman, Chiefs of Staff Committee was set to expire in May 1966, and a replacement had to be selected from the service chiefs. The Chief of the General Staff, Lieutenant General Sir John Wilton, had among defence and military circles been assumed to be the natural successor. However, mounting speculation arose from late 1965 over who was to be selected for the position as it became known Prime Minister Sir Robert Menzies preferred McNicoll for the post, as did Secretary of the Department of Defence Sir Ted Hicks, who thought McNicoll more intelligent and objective than his army counterpart. McNicoll lobbied ardently for the position, and was supported by his wife, Frances, who actively campaigned on her husband's behalf. By December 1965, Scherger's replacement had still not been decided upon and Menzies chose to delay the decision until the new year. However, Menzies retired in January 1966 and was succeeded by his deputy, Harold Holt. Holt and the newly appointed Minister for Defence, Allen Fairhall, preferred Wilton and ultimately selected him to succeed Scherger. In any event, McNicoll was created a Knight Commander of the Order of the British Empire in the 1966 New Year Honours for his service as CNS.

The White Ensign of the Royal Australian Navy, created in 1966 by the Naval Board under McNicoll

McNicoll was eager for a RAN contribution to the Vietnam War and, in July 1966, proposed that the four Australian minesweepers operating out of Singapore be deployed to Vietnamese waters since Konfrontasi was at an end and the vessels were no longer necessary in that area. The notion was rejected by Fairhall, however, who was conscious of an upcoming election and was adamant that nothing be decided until afterward. The possibility of a naval contribution to Vietnam was raised again in December, and it was decided that the guided missile destroyer HMAS Hobart and a clearance diving team of six personnel be deployed as the Royal Australian Navy Force Vietnam. Per an agreement between McNicoll and Admiral Roy L. Johnson, Commander of the United States Pacific Fleet, HMAS Hobart was to be attached to the United States Seventh Fleet and conduct shore bombardment operations. The deployment of an Australian destroyer to Vietnam became permanent, with the ships operating on a six-month rotation. To McNicoll's satisfaction, the RAN contribution to the theatre was further bolstered in 1967 with the formation of the RAN Helicopter Flight Vietnam and the dispatch of naval aviators to serve in an Army support role with No. 9 Squadron RAAF.

The visible legacy of McNicoll's service as CNS is the Australian White Ensign. The British White Ensign had been flown by Australian vessels since the formation of the RAN in 1911, but the Australian contribution to Vietnam—a conflict in which the United Kingdom was not involved—served to complicate the situation. Federal politician Sam Benson questioned the Australian use of the British ensign before parliament in October 1965, and McNicoll later raised the issue with the Naval Board. The Naval Board ultimately decided to recommend to the government that the RAN create its own unique white ensign. A design accompanied the recommendation, which described the ensign as a "white flag with the Union Flag in the upper canton at the hoist with six blue stars positioned as in the Australian flag". The government approved the proposal, and the Australian White Ensign was formally introduced throughout the RAN on 1 March 1967.

After 46 years of service, McNicoll retired from the RAN on 2 April 1968 and was succeeded as CNS by Vice Admiral Victor Smith. In the lead-up to his retirement, McNicoll completed a farewell tour by visiting several ships and naval establishments throughout Australia. The trip culminated with a two-week visit to Vietnam, and McNicoll was present in Saigon when the city was attacked by Viet Cong forces as part of the Tet Offensive. As a man who "liked action", McNicoll later stated that he received a "great thrill" during the assault as he awaited transportation back to Australia.

== Ambassador and later life ==
On his retirement from the Navy, McNicoll was appointed by the Australian government as its inaugural ambassador to Turkey. He was able to form amiable relations between the governments of Australia and Turkey, despite the physical and logistic issues associated with the establishment of a new embassy and the lack of knowledge both nations had of one another. McNicoll held his diplomatic post in Ankara for five years, before he returned to Australia in 1973 and retired to Canberra. A man of "culture and refined literary tastes", McNicoll engaged his passion for the arts during retirement and in 1979 published his translation of The Odes of Horace. He was also a music lover and a keen fly fisherman.

McNicoll died on 11 October 1987 at the age of 79. Remembered as a "well-informed, hard working and skilled administrator", he was cremated with full naval honours.

Frances, Lady McNicoll was an accomplished journalist and the sister of the diplomat Sir John Chadwick, the historian Owen Chadwick and the theologian Henry Chadwick. She was on the staff of The Economist, both in London and Australia, over a period of 20 years. She later became a contributing editor of Vogue Australia. She met Prime Minister Robert Menzies in 1959 and thereafter corresponded with him intermittently, agreeing in 1969 that she should write his biography. Menzies gave her exclusive access to his personal papers during his lifetime, and for three years after his death. She worked on the biography for several years, but it did not progress beyond first draft stage. She died in 1993.

== Notes ==
Military offices
| Preceded by Vice Admiral Sir Hastings Harrington | Chief of Naval Staff; 1965–1968 | Succeeded by Vice Admiral Sir Victor Smith |
| Preceded by Rear Admiral Galfry Gatacre | Flag Officer-in-Charge East Australia Area; 1964–1965 | Succeeded by Rear Admiral Otto Becher |
| Preceded by Rear Admiral Hastings Harrington | Flag Officer Commanding HM Australian Fleet; 1962–1964 | Succeeded by Rear Admiral Otto Becher |
| Preceded by Captain Galfry Gatacre | Deputy Chief of Naval Staff; 1951–1952 | Succeeded by Captain Otto Becher |
Diplomatic posts
| New title New position | Australian Ambassador to Turkey; 1968–1973 | Succeeded by John McMillan |
