= Siddells =

Siddells is a surname. Notable people with the surname include:

- Keith Siddells (1897–1979), New Zealand rugby union footballer
- Roy Siddells (1891–1947), New Zealand rugby league footballer

== See also ==
- Siddell, surname
- Siddle, surname
