= Siddall =

Siddall is a surname of Northern English origin. Notable people with the surname include:

- Adam Siddall (born 1988), New Zealand-born American rugby union international
- Arthur Siddall (born 1943), Anglican priest
- Barry Siddall (born 1954), English football player
- Brian Siddall (1930–2007), English football player
- Brianne Siddall (born 1963), American voice actress
- Christopher Siddall (born 1979), English cricketer
- Evan Siddall (born 1965), Canadian businessman
- Elizabeth Siddall (1829–1862), English model, poet, and artist
- Gary Siddall (born 1957), English rugby player
- Joe Siddall (born 1967), Canadian baseball player
- Joseph Bower Siddall (1840–1904), British doctor, foreign advisor in Japan
- Lauren Siddall (born 1984), English squash player
- Louise Siddall (1879–1935), American composer
- Mark Siddall, Canadian biologist
- Medley G. Siddall (1875–1964), Canadian politician
- Samantha Siddall (born 1982), English actress
- Shirli-Ann Siddall (born 1974), British professional tennis player
- Teddi Siddall (1953–2018), American actress
- Victoria Siddall (born 1977), British gallerist

== See also ==
- Siddal
- Siddell, another surname
