= 1982 Australia Day Honours =

The 1982 Australia Day Honours were announced on 26 January 1982 by the Governor General of Australia, Sir Zelman Cowen.

The Australia Day Honours are the first of the two major annual honours lists, announced on Australia Day (26 January), with the other being the Queen's Birthday Honours which are announced on the second Monday in June.

== Order of Australia ==
Order of Australia (Civil) ribbon

Order of Australia (Military) ribbon

=== Companion of the Order of Australia (AC) ===
==== General Division ====
Recipient	Citation	Notes
Sir Edward John Bunting KBE	For public and community service.	
Ethel Marian Summer, Baroness Casey CStJ	For service to literature, to art and to the community.	
The Honourable Charles Balfour Marcus Fenton	For service to the Parliament of the State of Tasmania and to the community.	
His Excellency, the Honourable Sir Henry Arthur Winneke KCMG, KCVO, OBE, KStJ, QC	For public service and for service to the Crown.	

==== General Division (Honorary) ====
Recipient	Citation	Notes
Mother Teresa (Bojaxhiu)	For service to the community of Australia and humanity at large.	
Shridath Surendranath Ramphal	For service to Australia and the Commonwealth community.	
Brian Edward Talboys	For service to Australia–New Zealand relations.	

=== Officer of the Order of Australia (AO) ===
==== General Division ====
Recipient	Citation	Notes
Emeritus Professor James Albert Allen	For service to education.	
The Honourable Clyde Robert Cameron	For service to politics and to government.	
Gordon Thomas Colebatch OBE	For service engineering.	
The Honourable James Desmond Corcoran	For service to politics and to government.	
The Honourable Sydney David Einfeld	For service to politics, to government and to the community.	
Warwick Joseph Holcroft	For service to industry.	
Dr Lawson James Holman	For service to medicine.	
Steven Kenneth Langley	For service to engineering.	
Robert Peter McIntyre	For service to architecture and to urban planning.	
Dr Walter Douglas Neal	For service to education.	
John Davey Norgard	For public service.	
Dr Henry Ian Alexander Nowik OBE	For service to industry and to the community.	
Neal Francis Stevens OBE	For public service.	
His Excellency Gordon Noel Upton	For public service as a diplomatic representative.	
Robert James White	For service to banking, to commerce and to the community.	
Dr John Douglas Yeo	For service to medicine.	

==== Military Division ====
Branch	Recipient	Citation	Notes
Army	Major General James Curnow Hughes DSO, MC	For service to the Australian Army	
Army	Major General Kevin Ross Melham OBE, ED, QC	For service to the Army Reserve.	
Air Force	Air Vice-Marshal Raymond Edward Trebilco DFC	For service to the Royal Australian Air Force.	

=== Member of the Order of Australia (AM) ===
==== General Division ====
Recipient	Citation	Notes
Jack Lewis Allen	For public service.	
Kathleen Harris Anderson	For service to politics, to government and to the community.	
Jeffrey Charles Bergmann	For service to local government and to the community.	
Harry Bluck	For service to music.	
Dietrich Hans Borchardt	For service to librarianship, particularly in the field of bibliography.	
Victor George Borg	For service to migrant welfare.	
Patricia Christine Braithwaite	For service to the media, particularly in the field of film and television.	
Detective Chief Inspector Barrie John Brown	For public service as a member of the Australian Federal Police.	
William Piper Brown	For service to engineering.	
Reginald Clement Buckett	For service to industry and to the community.	
Noel Wilfred Buckley	For service to the community.	
Associate Professor Kenneth John Cable	For service to education.	
Sergeant Frank Barry Cocks	For public service as a member of the South Australian Police.	
Brian Frederick Cooper	For public service as a radio scientist.	
Gregory Francis Coote	For service to the film industry and to the community	
John Edward Daley OBE	For service to the community.	
Lauris Margaret Elms OBE	For service to music.	
John Murray Evans	For public service.	
Robert Davis Fitzgerald	For service to literature.	
William Mervyn Flassman	For service as a hospital administrator.	
John Roslyn Garnet	For service to conservation.	
Rear Admiral Frank Leveson George CBE, RAN (Retired)	For service to the community.	
Father Anthony Joachim Glynn MBE	For service in the field of international relations.	
Arthur Herbert Hams	For service to the coal mining industry.	
Mervyn Emrys Rosser Horton	For service to the visual arts.	
Christopher Edward Howe	For service to the sport of trotting.	
The Reverend John Hughes ED	For service to religion and to the community.	
Geoffrey Brian Hunt	For service to the sport of squash.	
Professor Mark Jolly	For service to dentistry.	
John Harold Kaye MBE	For service to scouting and to the community.	
Dr Leslie Charles Dunstan Kemp	For service to education.	
Donald James Laverick	For service to the shipbuilding industry.	
Barry John McDonald	For service to the legal profession.	
Major General Ronald Ramsay McNicoll CBE (Retired)	For service to literature, particularly as an historian of military engineering.	
Kenneth Mallabone	For service to local government and to the community.	
Ronald Nevill Damian Miller DFC	For service to the community.	
Harold Bryce Mortlock	For service to architecture.	
Graeme Lloyd Murphy	For service to ballet.	
Raymond Jeffrey Myers	For service to the performing arts as an operatic singer.	
Raymond Lindsay O'Neill	For service to local government and to the community.	
Dr Dudley Joseph O'Sullivan	For service to the disabled.	
Merle Elecia Parkes	For service to nursing.	
Francis Albert Pascoe	For service to industry.	
Lindsay John Phillips	For service to primary industry and to the community.	
Henry Fox Powell	For service to the deaf.	
David Maxwell Purnell MBE	For service to the community.	
The Reverend Thomas Rees-Thomas MBE	For service to the community and to education.	
June Marie Salter	For service to the performing arts.	
Dr Leonard Ernest Samuels	For public service.	
William Leonard Sidwell	For service to industry and to the community.	
Edward Richard Taylor	For service to engineering.	
Brian Henry Tregillis	For public service.	
Ian Austin Abbot Vassie	For service to accountancy, to education and to the community.	
Edgar Morris Weatherstone	For service to international commerce.	
Clement Herman Alfred	For service to the community.	
Alan Brian Whelpton	For service to surf life saving.	
Raymond Gordon Williams	For public service.	
Dr George Charles Wilson	For service to medicine.	
Arthur Joseph Winter	For public service.	
Samuel William Woods	For service to education and to the community.	
Robert William Ernest Wrightson	For service to ballroom dancing.	

==== Military Division ====
Branch	Recipient	Citation	Notes
Navy	Captain Alan Lee Beaumont	For service to the Royal Australian Navy, particularly as Director of Naval Plans.	
Navy	Captain Anthony Rockley Horton	For service to the Royal Australian Navy, particularly as Commanding Officer of HMAS Hobart.	
Navy	Commander Peter James Bobroff	For service to the Royal Australian Navy particularly in the area of research into Naval Combat Data Systems.	
Navy	Commander David Whiston Nicol	For service to the Royal Australian Navy Fleet Air Arm in the field of training and technical support.	
Army	Lieutenant Colonel Reuben Ernest Bowd	For service to the Royal Australian Armoured Corps.	
Army	Colonel Robert Edmund Hagerty	For service to the Australian Army in the field of equipment management and procurement.	
Army	Colonel Peter Thomas Johnson	For service to the Australian Army in the field of Joint Service Planning.	
Army	Lieutenant Colonel Bruce Michael Kemp	For service to the Australian Army in the field of capability development.	
Army	Colonel Donald Lundie ED	For service to the army reserve.	
Air Force	Wing Commander Peter Massey Grindon-Ekins	For service to the Royal Australian Air Force, particularly as a staff officer in the Directorate of Operational Requirements.	
Air Force	Wing Commander Geoffrey Ivan Lumsden	For service to the Royal Australian Air Force, particularly as Commanding Officer of Number 37 Squadron.	
Air Force	Group Captain John Irvine Thomson	For service to the Royal Australian Air Force, particularly as Director Material Definition.	
Air Force	Group Captain Frederick James Winter	For service to the Royal Australian Air Force, particularly as the Senior Administrative Staff Officer at Headquarters Support Command.	

=== Medal of the Order of Australia (OAM) ===
==== General Division ====
Recipient	Citation	Notes
Dudley John George Allen	For public service.	
Margaret Edith Atkins	For service to education of the handicapped	
Harold Arthur Ayers	For service to the community and to sport.	
William Harold Barnes	For service to the community.	
David Alan Beavis	For service to the community.	
Michael Henry Geoffrey Becher ED	For service to surf life saving.	
Edwin Charles Bone	For public service and for service to trade unionism.	
James Alan Boultube	For service to the community.	
Raymond Arthur Bradfield RSD	For service to the community.	
George Swinton Bray	For service to local government.	
William Edward Sparke Brennan	For service to the welfare of members of the defence force	
Leonard James Bridge	For service to the community.	
Alderman Raymond Edward Buchanan	For service to local government and to the community.	
Zdzislaw Marian Burcon	For service to migrant welfare.	
Alice Maud Campbell	For service to the community.	
Percival Neil Carter	For service to the community.	
Arthur James Chalmers	For service to the community.	
Boyd Chandler	For service to the disabled.	
Joyce Charger	For service to the community.	
Elsie May Clarke	For service to the disabled.	
Edward George Coomber	For service to local government and to the community.	
Reginald William Correll	For service to the pig industry and to the community.	
Cedric Francis Culbert	For service to journalism.	
Sister Joan Davis	For service to nursing and to the community.	
John Dieters	For service to dentistry, particularly in the field of dental prosthetics.	
Max Frederick Dippert	For service to the toolmaking industry and to the community.	
James Albert Dix	For service to the community.	
Alan Towers Duncan	For service to adult education and to the community.	
Thomas James Edmonds	For service to the performing arts as an operatic singer.	
Raymond Thomas Edwards	For service to the community.	
Cyril Rodney Fechner	For service to accounting.	
Bernard Vincent Fennessy	For public service.	
Ronald Charles Field	For service to surf life saving.	
Francis George Ford	For service to local government and to the community.	
Joseph Henry Ford	For service to the community.	
Annetine Forell	For service to disabled children.	
Raymond Craig Frith	For service to athletics.	
Councillor James Murray Gavin	For service to local government.	
Donald William Geddes	For service to local government.	
Kathleen Goddard	For service to the community.	
Alan Murray Grant-Taylor	For service to the community.	
Marjorie Alma Green	For service in the field of child care and local government.	
Irene Joan Haesler	For service to ballet.	
Douglas Brooke Hall	For service to primary industry, particularly in the field of irrigation.	
Mavis Catherine Hamer	For service to the community.	
Miriam Doris Hampson	For service to the New Theatre.	
Edna May Harper	For service to nursing.	
Mervyn Harris	For service to the sport of basketball.	
Norwood Hartley	For service to the welfare of ex-service personnel and to the community.	
Dr Frederick French Heddle OStJ	For service in the field of community medical welfare.	
Leslie William Hellyer	For service to the welfare of ex-service personnel and to the community.	
Alderman Lewis Herman	For service to migrant welfare and to local government.	
Clarice Mary Maud Hering	For service to the community.	
Joan Syrelle Higgins	For service to the community.	
Howard Laurie Hill	For service to the disabled.	
John Noel Brian Hipwell	For service to the sport of rugby football.	
Lindsay Robert Hodge	For service to the community.	
Irene Isadora Hook	For service to the community.	
Brother Joseph Andrew Howley	For service in the field of Aboriginal welfare,	
Joan Catherine Hume	For service to the disabled.	
Beatrice Margaret Hunt	For service to disabled children.	
Thomas Patrick Hurley	For service to the disabled, through the invention and design of special equipment.	
Councillor Martin James Hynes	For service to local government and to the community.	
Florence Jane Jackson	For service to the community.	
Edward Fitzroy Kent Jaggard	For service to surf life saving.	
Harold Vincent Jenner	For service to youth welfare.	
Betty Margaret Jordon	For service to the community.	
Norman James Jordon	For service to the community.	
The Reverend Leo Walker Kalleske	For service to the community.	
Thomas Edward Kewley	For service in the field of social welfare education.	
Donald William Kidd	For service to the fruit and vegetable industry.	
Ion Will King	For service to the community.	
Ronald Herbert Kirkley	For service to disabled children.	
Albert Thomas Raymond Lloyd	For service to the sport of judo.	
Councillor Colin James Logan	For service to local government and to the community.	
James Jackson McCaulay	For service to the community.	
Myrtle Fidelis Iris Macrae	For service to the community.	
Sister Eleanor Macris	For service to the community.	
Amy Isobel Maslin	For service to the community.	
Doris Mary Matthews	For service to the community.	
Neil Francis McCrystal	For public service.	
Margaret Mary McKay	For service to the community.	
Colleen Joyce McLean	For service to migrant welfare and adult education.	
David McLeish	For service to trade unionism.	
Kathleen Elizabeth McManus	For service to the community.	
Ivan McMeekin	For service to the craft of pottery	
Michael Agapilos Michael	For service to local government and to the community.	
Margaret McVickar Crawford Mills	For public service.	
Sister Cecilia Morgan	For service to music.	
Sergeant Walter Desmond Morgan	For service to youth welfare.	
Mavis Waugh Morgan	For service to the community.	
Carlyle Herbert Mutton	For service to the sport of rifle shooting.	
Alice Eleanor Myers	For service to disabled children, particularly in the field of education.	
George Ivan Neville	For public service.	
Eileen Newton	For service to the community.	
Patrick Joseph Nilan	For service to the sport of hockey.	
Patrick Joseph O'Neil	For service to the blind	
Regina Loretto O'Neil	For public service.	
George Frederick James Parry	For service to the aged.	
Rupert Rowe Peft	For service to the sport of bowls.	
Peter Donald Penna	For service to local government and to the community.	
Cecil Clifford Phillips	For service to the community.	
Dr Frederick Roy Phillips SBStJ	For service in the field of community medical welfare.	
David William Pickering	For service to the community.	
Barbara Edith Pimlott	For service to the accountancy profession.	
George Bewick Podger BEM	For service to the disabled.	
Charles Raymond Porter	For service to youth welfare.	
Alexander Power	For public service.	
Doughlas Raymond Purser	For service to the welfare of ex-service personnel and to the community.	
Frances Ingram Purser	For service to the welfare of ex-service personnel.	
Tom Raudonikis	For service to the sport of rugby league football.	
Katherine Jane Rigby	For service to the disabled.	
Austin Patrick Robertson	For service to the sport of Australian football and in training of athletes.	
Margaret Winifred Ross	For service to the disabled, particularly in the field of sport.	
Hugh Clifton Rudderham	For service to the community.	
Charles Peter Schwerdt	For service to industry.	
Kevin Raymond Siddell	For service to music.	
Thomas Henry Sides	For service to youth welfare and to the community.	
William Burnett Smyth	For service to local government and to the community.	
Lionel Mervyn Stewart	For service to the community.	
Samuel Angus Stewart	For service to the blind.	
William Ernest Stone	For service to trade unionism.	
Dorothy Esther Strangward	For service to the aged.	
Myrtle Grace Swanson	For service to the community.	
Amy Katherine Taylor	For service to the welfare of ex-service personnel.	
Gladys Clair Taylor	For service to the aged.	
Councillor Hebert Raymond Thomas	For service to the community.	
John Eliot Tonkin MC	For service in the field of aboriginal welfare.	
Anthony Michael Vella	For service to trade unionism and to migrant welfare.	
Francis Edward Henry Verinder	For public service.	
Mabel Constance Wadsworth	For service to the community.	
Archdeacon Emeritus Professor Arthur Edward Warr	For service to religion.	
John Francis Watson	For service to trade unionism and to the community.	
Detective Senior Sergeant Paul Denison Westwood	For service as a member of the Australian Federal Police.	
Nancy Lockhard Whitelaw	For community service with the Australian War Memorial.	
Pamela June Willmette	For service to the sport of basketball.	
Malbel Isabel Watson	For community service.	
William John Youll	For public service and for service to the community.	
David Pelham Young	For service to the community.	

==== Military Division ====
Branch	Recipient	Citation	Notes
Navy	Warrant Officer Ronald Edward Ashmore	For service to the Royal Australian Navy, particularly as Establishment Maintenance Officer, HMAS Leeuwin.	
Navy	Warrant Officer Fred Robert Butcher	For service to the Royal Australian Navy Submarine Arm.	
Navy	Chief Petty Officer Richard Nicholas Curtis	For service to the Royal Australian Navy, particularly as the Marine Engineering Department Officer of HMAS Brisbane.	
Navy	Warrant Officer Robert Laurence Goodall	For service to the Royal Australian Navy in the field of Clearance Diving.	
Army	Warrant Officer Class Two John George Barnws	For service to the Royal Australian Army Ordnance Corps Centre.	
Army	Warrant Officer Class One John Leslie Brady	For service to the Army Reserve.	
Army	Warrant Officer Class One Robert William Foster	For service to the Royal Australian Electrical and Mechanical Engineers.	
Army	Captain Stanislaw Perejmibida	For service to the Australian Army in the field of personnel management.	
Army	Warrant Officer Class Two Donald Harry Quick	For service to the Royal Australian Army Medical Corps.	
Army	Warrant Officer Class Two Robert Douglas Wicks	For service to the Royal Australian Corps of Signals.	
Air Force	Flying Officer Edward Henry Lee	For service to the Royal Australian Air Force, particularly as a warrant officer disciplinary.	
