= Walter McNicoll =

Australian politician (1877–1947)

Brigadier General Sir Walter McNicoll KBE, CB, CMG, DSO, VD
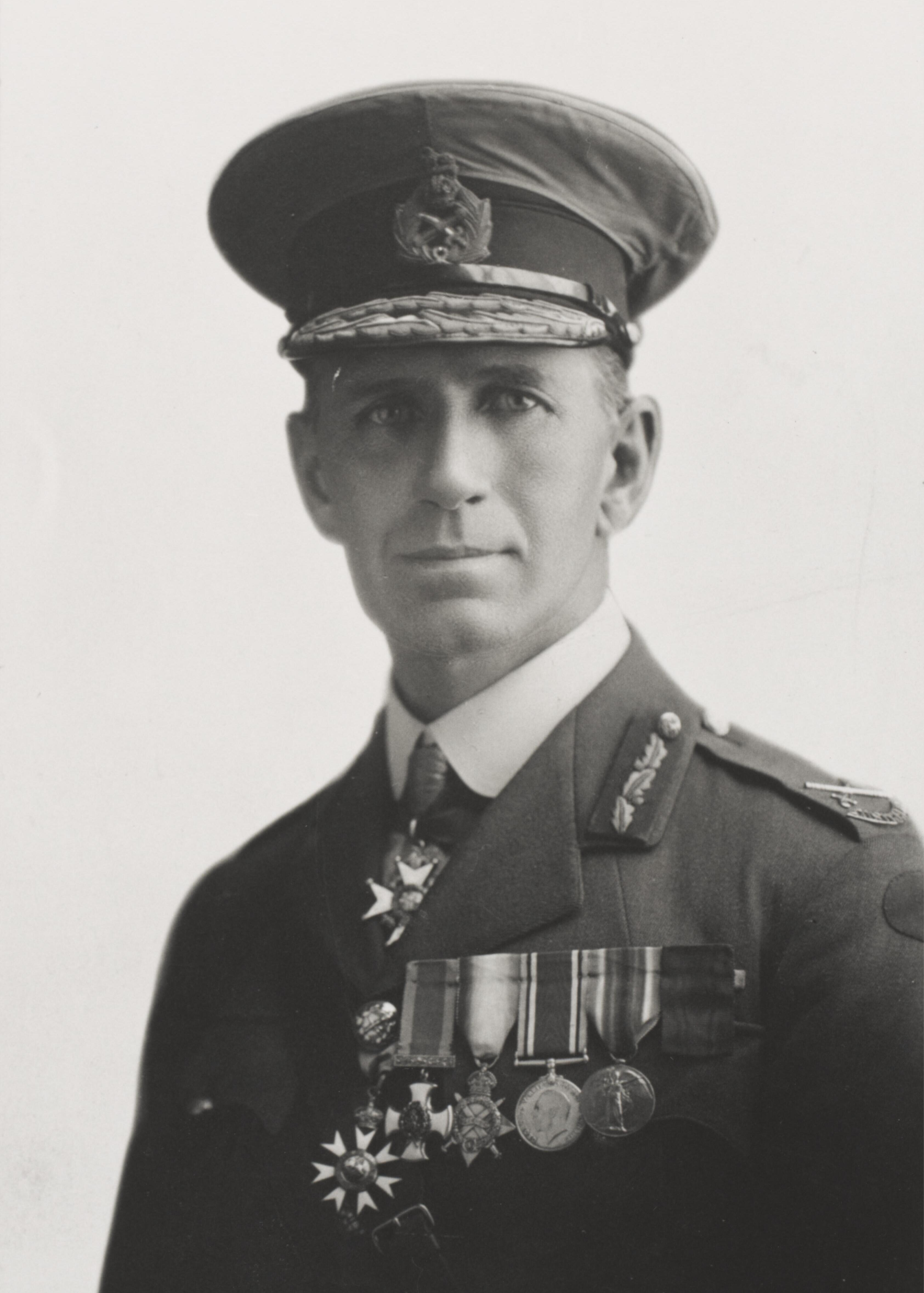

Administrator of the Territory of New Guinea
- In office 12 September 1934 – December 1942
- Monarchs: George V (1934–36); Edward VIII (1936); George VI (1936–42)
- Prime Minister: Joseph Lyons (1934–39); Sir Earle Page (1939); Robert Menzies (1939–41); Arthur Fadden (1941); John Curtin (1941–42)
- Preceded by: Thomas Griffiths
- Succeeded by: Japanese occupation

Member of the Australian Parliament for Werriwa
- In office 19 December 1931 – 14 September 1934
- Preceded by: Bert Lazzarini
- Succeeded by: Bert Lazzarini

Personal details
- Born: 27 May 1877 Emerald Hill, Victoria
- Died: 24 December 1947 (aged 70) Sydney, New South Wales
- Party: Country Party
- Spouse: Hildur Wedel Jarlsberg (m. 1905)
- Children: Ronald McNicoll; Sir Alan McNicoll
- Occupation: Teacher, soldier, politician and administrator
- Civilian awards: Knight Commander of the Order of the British Empire

Military service
- Allegiance: Australia
- Rank: Brigadier General
- Commands: 10th Brigade (1916–18); 6th Battalion (1915)
- Battles/wars: First World War; Gallipoli Campaign; Landing at Anzac Cove; Second Battle of Krithia; Western Front; Battle of Messines; Battle of Passchendaele; Battle of Amiens
- Military awards: Companion of the Order of the Bath; Companion of the Order of St Michael and St George; Distinguished Service Order; Colonial Auxiliary Forces Officers' Decoration; Mentioned in Despatches (5); Croix de guerre (Belgium)

Brigadier General Sir Walter Ramsay McNicoll, KBE, CB, CMG, DSO, VD (27 May 1877 – 24 December 1947) was an Australian soldier, politician and public servant. He was administrator of the Territory of New Guinea from 1934 to 1942.

== Early life ==
McNicoll was born in the Melbourne suburb of Emerald Hill, on 27 May 1877. He was the only son and eldest of three children to William Walter Alexander McNicoll (1852–1937) and Ellen McNicoll (née Ramsay, 1852–1900). He trained as a teacher in the Victorian Education Department and at Melbourne University. He held posts in various country schools in Victoria, then as a senior master at Melbourne High School and, from 1911 to 1914, founding principal of Geelong High School. At the same time, he had been active in the Victorian militia, which at the outbreak of the First World War became part of the Australian Imperial Force (AIF).

== First World War ==
As a lieutenant colonel, McNicoll commanded the 6th Battalion, 2nd Australian Brigade, at Gallipoli and was seriously wounded during an infantry charge in the Second Battle of Krithia on 8 May 1915. The brigade suffered 36 percent casualties in the course of two hours of action. He was found on the battlefield that evening by Charles Bean, then a war correspondent—later, Australia's official war historian. Bean piled discarded packs around McNicoll as protection against the still-continuing small arms fire and returned in the night with a stretcher party. McNicoll was invalided to Alexandria and then to London, where a second operation finally located and removed the bullet from his abdomen. Earlier at Gallipoli, McNicoll had played an unwitting role in the tragic accidental death of British Army Lieutenant Colonel Richard Nelson Bendyshe on 29 April; the two men were going through the trenches making an inspection, the sunburned, unshaven McNicoll in his tattered uniform a strong contrast to the English officer, when a Royal Marine stopped them, suspecting McNicoll of being "a disguised Turk" spy; firing at McNicoll, he instead hit Bendyshe in the stomach, killing him. This caused "pandemonium", with men charging to the scene and "firing wildly", three other men being shot; McNicoll was attacked with bayonets ("suffering only mild wounds") and taken down, his documents searched, before he was blindfolded and marched under armed escort down a communication trench. The first person the party encountered was the 6/AIF adjutant, "whose language on recognising his commanding officer was reported to be 'in the finest tradition of the AIF'". McNicoll returned to duty two days later after medical treatment.

Following a year's recuperation in Melbourne, McNicoll was promoted to brigadier general and given command of the 10th Infantry Brigade of the 3rd Division—under the command of Major General John Monash and, later, John Gellibrand. From December 1916 to the armistice nearly two years later, the brigade was part of numerous actions on the Western Front, including Messines, Ypres, the Somme, and Amiens.

== Politics ==
After the war McNicoll returned to teaching as founding principal of what is now the Argyle School in Goulburn, in southern New South Wales. In 1931, he stood for and won the federal seat of Werriwa, which extended from Goulburn to the coast, running as a member of the Country Party. He resigned towards the end of his term, however, when he was appointed Administrator of the Mandated Territory of New Guinea.

== Administrator of New Guinea ==
He served in that position from 1934 up to the time of the Japanese invasion in 1942. (During that period, the northern part of what is now Papua New Guinea, including New Britain and Bougainville, was administered by Australia under a League of Nations mandate; the southern part, Papua, was an Australian colony.) The manifold responsibilities of the Administrator ranged from education and justice to defence, with often conflicting advice or direction coming from the Permanent Mandates Commission and the Australian government, and pressures from the various religious missions, as well as commercial mining and plantation interests—the latter being almost the sole source of the Territory's revenues. Keenly interested in exploration, he led an expedition to the upper Sepik in 1935 (the party included the young J.K. McCarthy) and subsequently sponsored the Hagen-Sepik Patrol (1938–39) which explored the last great unknown tract of the Territory. McNicoll was knighted for his work organising relief efforts after the 1937 volcanic eruption that nearly destroyed the Territory capital, Rabaul.

== Personal life ==
He married Hildur Marschalk Wedel Jarlsberg, from a distinguished Norwegian family, on 10 June 1905. Their marriage produced five children, all sons: Ronald Ramsay McNicoll (1906–1996); Sir Alan Wedel Ramsay McNicoll (1908–1987); Colin Wedel Ramsay McNicoll (1909–1921); Frederick Oscar Ramsay McNicoll (1910–1989); and David Ramsay (aka Jack Meander) McNicoll (1914–2000). Ronald and Alan both attained senior positions in the Australian military—becoming a major general and vice admiral respectively—while David was a well-known Sydney-based journalist.

McNicoll died in Sydney on 24 December 1947, aged 70 years.

== Notes ==
Parliament of Australia
Preceded by Bert Lazzarini	Member for Werriwa; 1931–1934	Succeeded by Bert Lazzarini
