= Otto Becher =

Senior officer in the Royal Australian Navy

Otto Humphrey Becher
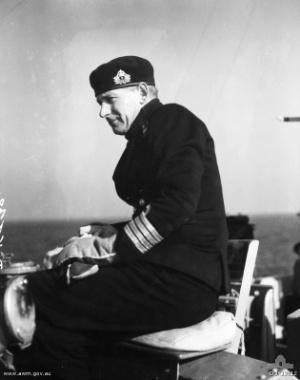
- Captain Otto Becher on the bridge of HMAS Warramunga c. 1951
- Born: 13 September 1908; Harvey, Western Australia
- Died: 15 June 1977 (aged 68); Sydney, New South Wales
- Military career
- Allegiance: Australia
- Branch: Royal Australian Navy
- Service years: 1922–1966
- Rank: Rear Admiral
- Commands: HM Australian Fleet (1964–65); HMAS Melbourne (1957–58); HMAS Vengeance (1954–56); HMAS Warramunga (1950–51); HMAS Watson (1950); HMAS Quickmatch (1944–45)
- Conflicts: Second World War; Namsos Campaign; Battle of the Mediterranean; Battle of Crete; Pacific War; South-East Asian theatre; South West Pacific theatre; Battle of Okinawa; Korean War; Battle of Inchon; Siege of Wonsan
- Awards: Commander of the Order of the British Empire; Distinguished Service Order; Distinguished Service Cross & Bar; Mentioned in Despatches; Legion of Merit (United States)
- Other work: Director-General of Recruiting (1966–69)

Rear Admiral Otto Humphrey Becher, CBE, DSO, DSC & Bar (13 September 1908 – 15 June 1977) was a senior officer in the Royal Australian Navy (RAN). Born in Harvey, Western Australia, Becher entered the Royal Australian Naval College in 1922. After graduating in 1926, he was posted to a series of staff and training positions prior to specialising in gunnery.

A lieutenant commander at the outbreak of the Second World War, Becher assisted in the extraction of Allied troops from the Namsos region of Norway while aboard the heavy cruiser HMS Devonshire, and was decorated with the Distinguished Service Cross. Following service in the Mediterranean theatre, he returned to Australia in 1942 as officer-in-charge of the gunnery school at HMAS Cerberus. He spent two years at Cerberus before being given command of the Q class destroyer HMAS Quickmatch in March 1944. While commanding Quickmatch in operations against Japanese forces in the Pacific, Becher earned a Bar to his Distinguished Service Cross.

At the war's end Becher was posted to the Navy Office and later to the aircraft carrier HMAS Sydney; in 1951 he was given command of the destroyer HMAS Warramunga. Warramunga formed part of Australia's contribution to the United Nations forces engaged in the Korean War; Becher was promoted to captain and awarded the Distinguished Service Order while carrying out operations in Korean waters. On returning to Australia, he filled several staff positions and commanded the aircraft carriers HMAS Melbourne and HMS Vengeance. Promoted to rear admiral in 1959, he served as Flag Officer Commanding Australian Fleet from 1964 to 1965, before taking up the post of Flag Officer-in-Charge East Australia Area. Becher retired from the RAN in 1966, and died in 1977 at the age of 68.

== Early life and career ==
Otto Becher was born in Harvey, Western Australia, on 13 September 1908, to Francis Joseph Becher, an orchardist, and Antonia Amalie (née Vetter). On 1 January 1922, at the age of thirteen, he enrolled in the Royal Australian Naval College at Jervis Bay, where he performed well both academically and at sport, receiving colours for hockey and tennis. Graduating in 1926, he served as a midshipman aboard HMAS Adelaide and later HMAS Brisbane, before being posted to the United Kingdom in September of that year for further sea-training and professional development with the Royal Navy.

Becher was promoted to acting sub-lieutenant in September 1928; the rank was made substantive the following March. He returned to Australia in January 1930 and was raised to lieutenant, gaining further seafaring experience over the next two years on HMAS Australia and HMAS Canberra. Deciding to specialise in gunnery, he attended an advanced course at the Royal Navy's gunnery school at HMS Excellent in England from September 1932 until April 1934. Returning to Australia in May 1934, Becher was posted to the gunnery school at the shore establishment HMAS Cerberus in Victoria until June 1935.

On 7 January 1935, Becher married Valerie Chisholm Baird at St Michael's Anglican Church in Vaucluse, New South Wales; the couple had three sons. From June 1935 to March 1937, he served aboard HMAS Canberra as intelligence officer, after which he was transferred to HMAS Stuart for flotilla duties. Promoted to lieutenant commander on 16 June 1938, Becher briefly returned to Cerberus before embarking for the United Kingdom on exchange with the Royal Navy in January 1939.

== Second World War ==
Becher was serving as squadron gunnery officer aboard the Royal Navy heavy cruiser HMS Devonshire when the Second World War broke out. In May 1940, Devonshire was dispatched to the Namsos region of Norway to assist in the extraction of Allied troops. Commended for his "daring, resource and devotion" during the operation, Becher was awarded the Distinguished Service Cross. The notification for the decoration was published in a supplement to the London Gazette on 19 July 1940, and the investiture ceremony was held by King George VI at Buckingham Palace on 11 March 1941.

In late November 1940, Becher transferred to the recently launched destroyer HMAS Napier as part of the ship's commissioning crew. While completing working-up exercises, Napier was tasked with transferring British Prime Minister Winston Churchill and his wife from Thurso in Scotland to the battleship HMS King George V, and later returning them to the mainland. With her working-up complete, Napier was initially posted to convoy duties in the North Atlantic, before setting sail in April 1941 with HMAS Nizam for the Mediterranean Sea. Arriving in May, she formed up as part of the Mediterranean Fleet.

Napier assisted in the evacuation of British and Commonwealth troops from the island of Crete in late May, following the successful Axis invasion. On one such occasion the vessel embarked 296 soldiers, three women, one Greek and one Chinese civilian, ten sailors, two children and a dog. Returning to Alexandria, the destroyer came under attack but arrived unscathed. Two days later Napier was less fortunate; having taken 705 soldiers on board, she was targeted on her return journey by a formation of twelve German dive-bombers. The ship was struck twice by bombs and suffered damage to the stern, the engine room and boiler room. One of the aircraft was shot down and a further three damaged. Although no allied casualties were sustained and the destroyer arrived safely in Alexandria, she spent the next two-and-a-half months in Port Said under repair.

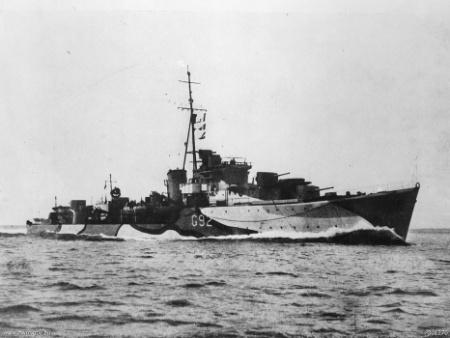
HMAS Quickmatch, under the command of Commander Otto Becher from 1944 to 1945

Becher returned to Australia in early 1942, and from 17 May was appointed officer-in-charge of the gunnery school at HMAS Cerberus. He remained at this post for almost two years until, on 12 March 1944, he was given command of the destroyer HMAS Quickmatch—formed up as part of the Eastern Fleet. On 22 July, Quickmatch was among a 23-vessel strong task force that set out from Trincomalee to assault the Japanese naval base off northern Sumatra at Sabang Island. The formation approached Sabang on the night of 24/25 July, launching fighter strikes on airfields in the area at first light. At 06:55, the fleet bombarded the harbour installations, coastal defence batteries and the military barracks. As the formation's two battleships maintained their fire, Quickmatch joined three other ships that entered the harbour to carry out close-range bombardment. After completing their task, Quickmatch and her fellows withdrew under the cover of fire from two cruisers. Praised for his "outstanding courage and skill" in pressing home the assault, Becher was awarded a Bar to his Distinguished Service Cross, announced in a supplement to the London Gazette on 31 October 1944.

In October 1944, Quickmatch was transferred to Australian waters and underwent her annual refit at Sydney from November to December. Once the refit was completed she operated mainly off the Australian coast. During the early hours of 25 December 1944, the Navy Office in Melbourne received an SOS from the SS Robert J. Walker, reporting that she had been torpedoed by a submarine while travelling from Fremantle, Western Australia, to Sydney. Aircraft were dispatched to provide aerial cover, and HMA Ships Quickmatch, Kiama and Yandra were directed to Robert J. Walker's position. Quickmatch and Yandra were to operate against the submarine, while Kiama was to take the Robert J. Walker under tow. Arriving at the reported location at approximately 23:30 that evening, Quickmatch, under the command of Becher, and Kiama patrolled the vicinity in search of the submarine and Robert J. Walker's crew. Sixty-seven men were discovered in lifeboats at 05:45 the following morning and were taken aboard Quickmatch; Robert J. Walker had sunk two hours earlier with the loss of two crew.

Becher was promoted to commander on 31 December 1944, and the following month Quickmatch was transferred to the recently established British Pacific Fleet. On 28 February, the British Pacific Fleet, including Quickmatch, sailed from Sydney Harbour for Manus Island to prepare for its role in support of the planned United States invasion of Okinawa. The fleet engaged in eleven days of exercises at Manus before departing for Ulithi, and on 23 March was attached to the United States Fifth Fleet with the designation "Task Force 57". Setting sail for Okinawa two days later, the fleet launched air strikes against airfield targets in the Sakishima Islands on 26 and 27 March. During these operations Quickmatch formed part of the escort for the fleet's aircraft carriers. Becher later stated: "These two days' operations were successful, the enemy airstrips being neutralised and a number of aircraft being destroyed on the ground." Task Force 57 continued operations around the Sakishima Islands for the following two months to cover the United States' left flank, with Quickmatch forming part of the carrier force's escort throughout this period.

On 25 June 1945, Becher relinquished command of the Quickmatch and returned to Australia, where he was attached to the shore base HMAS Penguin. For his "distinguished service ... in the Pacific" he received a Mention in Despatches. In August, he transferred to HMAS Cerberus for duties with the Navy Office.

== Interbellum and Korean War ==
Becher remained with the Navy Office until November 1947, when he was posted to the United Kingdom to join the aircraft carrier HMAS Sydney's commissioning crew. Embarking from Melbourne during February 1948, he was temporarily attached to HMS Drake and later HMS Glory until Sydney's commissioning on 16 December. His service aboard the aircraft carrier lasted for two years, and was followed on 23 January 1950 by an appointment as Commanding Officer to the shore establishment HMAS Watson. However, Becher's time at Watson was cut short when, on 28 July, he relieved Captain Alan McNicoll as commander of the destroyer HMAS Warramunga, which had been selected for service in the Korean War. Warramunga was to be attached to a force of five Royal Navy destroyers led by a captain, making it expedient to have the Australian ship commanded by an officer of lower rank.

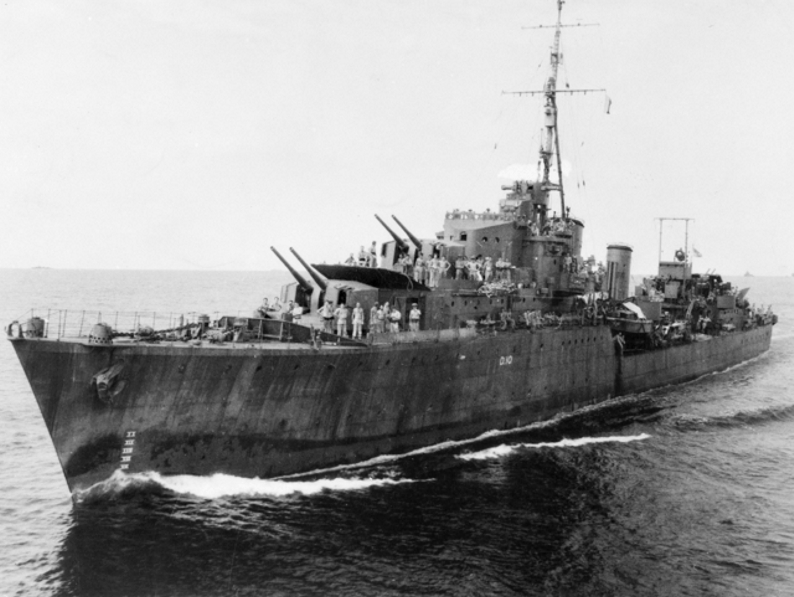
HMAS Warramunga, which served in the Korean War under Captain Otto Becher from 1950 to 1951

Warramunga arrived in Korean waters in late August 1950. After some initial escort work, the destroyer joined HMAS Bataan as part of the carrier HMS Triumph's protective screen while the latter contributed air cover to the Allied landing at Inchon on 15 September. For the next three months, Warramunga engaged in patrol and screening duties, in addition to transporting food for famine relief.

On 4 December, Warramunga and Bataan supported the emergency withdrawal of Allied troops from Chinnampo. Becher decided to sail up a channel of the Taedong River known as Short Cut, which according to his charts should have allowed him five to ten feet of clearance. The chart proved inaccurate, and Warramunga ran aground at 23:15; Becher's only option was to wait for the rising tide to float the destroyer off. Warramunga came free at 23:50 without having sustained damage, and was able to resume her mission, escorting troop transports south. Later, Becher brought Warramunga alongside Bataan and entreated the latter's commander, via megaphone, to keep quiet about the incident. With Becher's promotion to captain due, he was concerned that if the Naval Board became aware of the grounding his promotion would be delayed until an investigation had taken place. His "well-earned" rise in rank came through as scheduled on 31 December. On the journey south, Warramunga's crew developed a new way of signalling between ships that was considerably quicker than using international code flags. Known to the crew as the "Murphy Method", it involved wrapping messages around potatoes and throwing them from one ship to the other.

Warramunga participated in the siege of Wonsan during late February 1951, where she engaged and partially destroyed North Korean shore batteries, as well as shelling buildings and transport infrastructure. Despite coming under fire the destroyer sustained no damage. For the remainder of her tour in Korea, Warramunga took part in patrols and shore bombardments, earning special praise from Vice Admiral C. Turner Joy, Commander US Naval Forces Far East, for the accuracy of her gunnery.

On 17 July 1951, it was announced that Becher had been appointed as an honorary aide-de-camp to the Governor-General of Australia for a period of three years. Following Warramunga's departure from Korean waters on 1 August, Rear Admiral Alan Scott-Moncrieff, Commander West Coast Blockade Force, commented: "She has been a tower of strength and done an incredible amount of steaming with no troubles at all. I cannot speak too highly of Captain O. H. Becher and his men ..." Together with Bataan, Warramunga had borne the brunt of Australia's naval contribution to the Korean War. Noting his "courage, skill and determination", a recommendation for Becher to be awarded the Distinguished Service Order was approved by the Australian Government on 17 August 1951, and announced in the London Gazette the following month. For his "meritorious service ... as C.O. of HMAS Warramunga", Becher was also decorated by the United States with the Legion of Merit.

== Senior command ==
Becher retained command of Warramunga until October 1951, when he was posted to the shore base HMAS Lonsdale for service with the Navy Office as Deputy Chief of Naval Personnel and Director of Personal Services. In September that year he was additionally appointed trustee of the Services Canteens Trust Fund; a position he held until October 1952 and for which he received a letter of appreciation from the Minister for Defence. The same month he assumed the position of Deputy Chief of Naval Staff. On 25 August 1954, Becher was given command of the aircraft carrier HMAS Vengeance, and in October he returned with his new command to the Korean theatre to transport the aircraft, equipment and personnel of No. 77 Squadron RAAF back to Australia.

In 1956, Becher embarked for the United Kingdom to attend the Imperial Defence College. A month after his December graduation, he travelled back to Australia and assumed command of HMAS Melbourne. Becher remained with Melbourne until December 1958, at which time he returned to the Navy Office at HMAS Lonsdale to resume his role as Deputy Chief of Naval Staff. He was promoted to acting rear admiral on 3 January 1959, the rank being made substantive twelve months later. In the Queen's Birthday Honours of 1961, Becher was appointed a Commander of the Order of the British Empire.

Relinquishing his position with the Navy Office in 1962, Becher was sent to the United Kingdom as Head of the Australian Joint Services Staff in London. In January 1964 he returned to Australia, and was made Flag Officer Commanding HM Australian Fleet. During his time in this role Becher became embroiled in the controversy that followed the collision of HMA Ships Voyager and Melbourne, which took place in February that year. Before giving evidence before the Royal Commission that had been established to investigate the incident, Becher had discussed events with Melbourne's Commanding Officer, Commander Ronald Robertson. The discussion became public knowledge, and led to suggestions of conspiracy. Becher stated to the commission that Melbourne should have questioned Voyager's final movements; his evidence is alleged to have influenced the Royal Commissioner, Sir John Spicer, to place a degree of blame on Robertson. In 1965, Becher assumed his final command as Flag Officer-in-Charge East Australia Area, before retiring from the Royal Australian Navy on 6 March 1966.

== Retirement ==
Following his retirement, Becher accepted the position of Director-General of Recruiting for the Australian armed forces from 1966 until 1969, a period during which conscription was in effect. Minister of Defence Allen Fairhall asked Becher to find enough volunteers to fill the armed forces, and Becher believed that conscription eroded professional standards, but he found this task difficult given that the military was "competing with industry, and the country was short of labour." He also held the post of chairman of the Council of the Institute of Marine Sciences at the University of New South Wales. On 15 June 1977, aged 68, Becher died from a myocardial infarction at Sydney Hospital. Survived by his wife and their three sons, he was cremated.

== Notes ==
Military offices
Preceded by Rear Admiral Alan McNicoll	Flag Officer-in-Charge East Australia Area; 1965–1966	Succeeded by Rear Admiral Thomas Morrison
Preceded by Rear Admiral Alan McNicoll	Flag Officer Commanding HM Australian Fleet; 1964–1965	Succeeded by Rear Admiral Thomas Morrison
Preceded by Rear Admiral Galfry Gatacre	Deputy Chief of Naval Staff; 1959–1962	Succeeded by Rear Admiral Thomas Morrison
Preceded by Captain Alan McNicoll	Deputy Chief of Naval Staff; 1952–1954	Succeeded by Captain Henry Burrell
