= HMAS Shoalhaven =

1944 River-class frigate

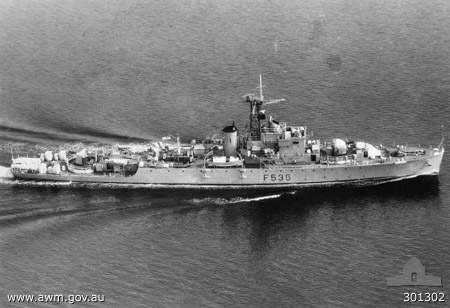

History

Australia
- Name: Shoalhaven
- Namesake: Shoalhaven River
- Builder: Walkers, Maryborough
- Laid down: 18 December 1943
- Launched: 14 December 1944
- Commissioned: 2 May 1946
- Decommissioned: 19 December 1955
- Motto: "Let us follow the heavenly light"
- Honours and awards: Battle honours: Korea 1950
- Fate: Sold for scrap

General characteristics
- Class & type: Modified River-class frigate
- Displacement: 1537 tons standard; 2200 tons full load
- Length: 301 ft 7 in (91.92 m)
- Beam: 36 ft 6 in (11.13 m)
- Draught: 12 ft (3.7 m)
- Propulsion: Triple expansion, 2 shafts
- Speed: 19.5 knots (36.1 km/h; 22.4 mph)
- Complement: 175
- Armament: 4 × 4-inch guns; 3 × 40 mm Bofors; 4 × 20 mm Oerlikons; 1 × Hedgehog; 4 × depth charge throwers

HMAS Shoalhaven (K535/M535/F535), named for the Shoalhaven River in New South Wales, was a modified River-class frigate of the Royal Australian Navy. She was laid down by Walkers at Maryborough on 18 December 1943, launched on 14 December 1944 by Senator Dorothy Tangney and commissioned at Urangan Pier in Hervey Bay in Queensland on 2 May 1946. Her first commander was Commander Rodney Rhoades.

== Design and construction ==
Shoalhaven was originally ordered as part of an Australian shipbuilding program during World War II that would provide 22 River-class frigates for the RAN. The first eight ships were completed to this specification, before the design was modified, now based on the British Bay-class frigate. Despite this change, the remaining planned ships would still be named after Australian rivers. At the end of the war, the order was cancelled, except for four, including Shoalhaven, which had already been launched. HMAS Shoalhaven was the third of the four modified River-class ships to enter service and was the lead ship of the Navy's First Frigate Flotilla.

== Operational history ==
=== 1940s ===
After her commissioning, Shoalhaven made several trips to New Guinea between 1946 and 1948, supporting a mines clearance unit. Between January and April 1949, she participated in exercises with the Royal Navy and United States Navy in Asia, visiting both Shanghai and Hong Kong. While assigned to the Royal Navy's Far East Fleet in April of that year, the Admiralty identified Shoalhaven to relieve HMS Consort as guard ship to support Chinese nationalist diplomats in the port of Nanking. The Menzies government in Canberra denied permission for the ship to be used for a mission that was viewed as purely symbolic, with no apparent objective. Shoalhaven would only be made available to sail up the Yangtze River for mercy missions in the event the nationalists fell to communist forces with no other means of evacuation. This restriction forced the Admiralty to instead dispatch HMS Amethyst from Hong Kong to relieve Consort, with both British vessels subsequently attacked by the People's Liberation Army in what is now known as the Yangtze Incident.

Shoalhaven returned to Australia in June 1949. She was again assigned to the Far East to support the Commonwealth occupation forces in Japan, arriving at Kure in January 1950. Shoalhaven was in Kure on 25 June 1950 when North Korea unexpectedly invaded South Korea, escalating the conflict on the peninsula to open warfare.

=== Korean War ===
Shoalhaven was committed to military action in support of South Korea on 29 June, again assigned to the British Far East Fleet commanded by Rear-Admiral William Andrewes. The ship carried out the first Australian operation of the war on 1 July under the command of Commander Ian McDonald with 6 officers and 177 sailors aboard, providing escort for United Nations ships carrying troops and ammunition to Korean ports from Japan. Having successfully escorted an American ship Sergeant George D. Keathley from Tsushima Island into the port of Busan, on 2 July she departed for the American base at Sasebo, Japan carrying a South Korean liaison party. On 6 July, Shoalhaven joined the destroyer USS Collett off the west coast of Korea where she was performed blockade duties during a three day patrol. The frigate then resumed her escort role through July and August, successfully escorting 14 convoys during her tour. Shoalhaven also performed routine anti-submarine duties and bombardment of coastal targets, coming under enemy fire on several occasions.

At the outbreak of the war, Shoalhaven had been due to return to Australia for refit. With the arrival of HMAS Warramunga on 6 September, she completed her brief tour, arriving at Garden Island on 22 September. Following the Korean Armistice Agreement in July 1953, Shoalhaven was again sent to Korea to participate in allied patrols during 1954. For her role in the conflict, the ship would later receive the battle honour "Korea 1950".

=== 1950s ===
After her return from Korea, Shoalhaven operated mostly within Australian and New Guinea waters, including participating in a British nuclear weapons test in the Montebello Islands off the coast of Western Australia as part of Operation Hurricane. Her last foreign deployment lasted from July 1954 to March 1955, patrolling waters between Hong Kong, Japan and Korea to enforce the Korean Armistice.

== Decommissioning and legacy ==
HMAS Shoalhaven paid off to reserve on 19 December 1955. With no need for her reactivation, Shoalhaven was sold in January 1962 to H. C. Sleigh and Company to be broken up for scrap by Mitsubishi Australia.

In September 2008, the City of Shoalhaven and veterans from the HMAS Shoalhaven Association dedicated an 18 tonne stone monument in Walsh Park, Bomaderry to commemorate the ship's achievements during her service with the Royal Australian Navy.

== Affiliations ==
- TS Shoalhaven, Australian Navy Cadets
