= Dietrich Borchardt =

Australian librarian and bibliographer

Dietrich Borchardt AM
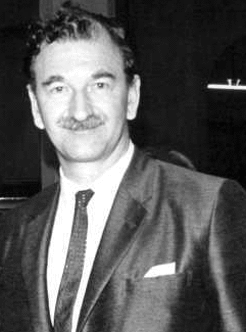
- Born: 14 April 1916; Hanover, Lower Saxony, Germany
- Died: 6 June 1997 (aged 81)
- Occupations: Librarian, bibliographer
- Writing career
- Notable works: Checklist of Royal Commissions; Australian Bibliography; Australia: A Guide to Sources

Dietrich Hans Borchardt AM (14 April 1916 – 6 June 1997) was an Australian librarian and bibliographer.

== Career ==
Born in Hanover, Germany, to Jewish parents, Borchardt escaped Nazism via Italy and emigrated to New Zealand. There he studied at Victoria University, Wellington, and graduated with a Bachelor of Arts in 1944 and Master of Arts in 1947. He gained a library diploma from the New Zealand Library School.

He was Acquisitions Librarian at the University of Otago Library in 1949 to 1950. He was appointed as deputy librarian (1950–52) and then chief librarian (1953–1965) at the University of Tasmania. He also tutored in modern languages at that university.

In 1965 Borchardt was appointed foundation librarian at La Trobe University where he worked until he retired in 1981. The library was named the Borchardt Library after him on his retirement.

== Writing ==
Borchardt wrote many reference works and bibliographies on Australian studies, including his Australian Bibliography: A Guide to Printed Sources of Information (1963; updated in 1976), his Australian Bibliography (3rd edition, 1979), his Australia: A Guide to Sources (1987), and his Australian Official Publications (1979).

He also wrote extensively on editing, printing, the book in Australia, the growth of librarianship in Australia, and on the literature on philosophy and psychology, statistics and government publications, including his Checklist of Royal Commissions (1958–78).

== Public service ==
Borchardt was founding editor of the journal Australian Academic and Research Libraries (1970–84), a foundation fellow of the Library Association of Australia, and a long-term member of the Standing Committee of Australian Advisory Council on Bibliographical Services and convenor on the Working Party on Bibliography.

He was also actively involved with the Committee of Australian University Librarians and the Bibliographical Society of Australia and New Zealand. He played a leading role in the International Federation of Library Associations.

Borchardt periodically contributed to the library scene in other countries. In 1964 he spent a period as a UNESCO library expert in Ankara, Turkey. in 1968 and 1973 he was a visiting professor of librarianship in the United States. On another occasion he advised on developing library services in Indonesia.

Borchardt did a lot of work facilitating access to Australian government information by developing the La Trobe University Library government publications collection and writing publications (checklists, bibliographies and surveys), and submitting to and appearing before the Joint Committee on Publications of the Commonwealth Parliament.

== Awards ==
The Library Association of Australia made Borchardt a Fellow in 1964 and gave him an H.C.L. Anderson Award (awarded for outstanding service to the library profession) in 1978. His achievements as a librarian, bibliographer and a scholar were recognised with the award of a Queen Elizabeth II Silver Jubilee Medal in 1977. In 1982 he was made a Member of the Order of Australia "for service to librarianship, particularly in the field of bibliography".
