= Ronald McNicoll =

Australian Army general

Ronald Ramsay McNicoll
- Born: 15 September 1906; Melbourne, Victoria
- Died: 18 September 1996 (aged 90); Melbourne, Victoria
- Relatives: Brigadier General Sir Walter McNicoll (father); Vice Admiral Sir Alan McNicoll (brother)
- Military career
- Allegiance: Australia
- Branch: Australian Army
- Service years: 1923–1964
- Rank: Major General
- Conflicts: Second World War; Korean War
- Awards: Commander of the Order of the British Empire; Member of the Order of Australia; Mentioned in Despatches

Major General Ronald Ramsay McNicoll, CBE, AM (15 September 1906 – 18 September 1996) was an Australian Army general who served in the Royal Australian Engineers.

== Early life ==
Born on 15 September 1906 in Melbourne, Victoria, McNicoll was the son of Sir Walter McNicoll and elder brother of Sir Alan McNicoll. Growing up in Goulburn, he completed his schooling at Scots College before taking up an appointment as a staff cadet at the Royal Military College, Duntroon in 1923. After graduating from Duntroon in 1926, he was granted the rank of lieutenant in the engineers and undertook a civilian engineering degree at the University of Sydney.

== Military career ==
In the pre-war years, he was involved in constructing bases in the northern part of Australia, including Larrakeyah Barracks in Darwin. He was also posted to the 4th Division in Melbourne, undertook training overseas and served in regimental appointments in Brisbane, Adelaide and then later Keswick, in South Australia.

During the Second World War, McNicoll saw active service in the Middle East and in Europe, including a period on exchange with the Supreme Headquarters Allied Expeditionary Force, helping to plan the D-Day landings. He was Mentioned in Despatches as a major of engineers while serving in the 6th Division.

After the war, he was steadily promoted. As a temporary brigadier he briefly served during the Korean War deploying with the Australian Ancillary Unit in March 1953. He undertook a number of different staff appointments including Chief Engineer of Eastern Command and Engineer-in-Chief, Army Headquarters. He eventually reaching the rank of major general before retiring from the military in 1964. He later wrote three volumes of the Royal Australian Engineers corps history, covering the periods from colonial Australia to the Second World War. He was appointed a Commander of the Order of the British Empire in 1957, and a Member of the Order of Australia in 1982. He died on 18 September 1996, just three days after turning ninety.

== Bibliography ==
- McNicoll, Ronald (1977). The Royal Australian Engineers 1835 to 1902: The Colonial Engineers. History of the Royal Australian Engineers, Volume I. Canberra: Australian Capital Territory: Corps Committee of the Royal Australian Engineers. ISBN 9780959687118.
- McNicoll, Ronald (1979). The Royal Australian Engineers 1902 to 1919: Making and Breaking. History of the Royal Australian Engineers, Volume II. Canberra: Australian Capital Territory: Corps Committee of the Royal Australian Engineers. ISBN 9780959687125.
- McNicoll, Ronald (1982). The Royal Australian Engineers 1919 to 1945: Teeth and Tail. History of the Royal Australian Engineers, Volume III. Canberra: Australian Capital Territory: Corps Committee of the Royal Australian Engineers. ISBN 9780959687101.
