= Kevin Siddell =

Australian pianist & composer (1924-2004)

Kevin Raymond Siddell OAM (14 March 1924 – 2004) was a New Zealand-born Australian pianist, composer, and public service official, active mostly in the states of Queensland and Victoria, Australia.

For his services to music, in 1982, Siddell was awarded a Medal of the Order of Australia in the General Division (OAM) in the 1982 Australia Day Honours.

Kevin Siddell was a Life Member of the Accompanists Guild of Queensland, Inc.

== Early years ==
Siddell was born in Taihape, New Zealand.

== Public service roles ==
In 1970, Kevin Siddell became Queensland’s first Supervisor of Music with the Queensland Department of Education (now known as the Department of Education and Training (Queensland).

This role required overseeing the State’s school music programs, and travel to regional and rural centres in order to carry this out. During this period, music teachers in Queensland state schools employed the autoharp in the classroom, and Siddell composed music for this instrument.

During the 1980s, Siddell became Director of Cultural Activities, and in that role, among other achievements, Siddell provided government funds for the expansion of the Noosa Arts Theatre facilities, and attended the opening in 1982.

Siddell’s commitment to the promotion of the arts in Queensland was recognised in state parliament during the discussion of the Queensland Theatre Company Act and Another Act Amendment Bill, 26 November 1985. Mr Palaszczuk (Archerfield) commented, “One had only to read the monthly cultural affairs diary to realise how widely Mr Siddell travelled to promote the arts in Queensland … whenever the arts are discussed, the name of Kevin Siddell is spoken with great admiration and respect.”

== Performance ==
Siddell was co-director with John Curro of the National Music Camp held in Brisbane in 1982.

Siddell was involved in music concerts, including a performance as co-reader of the Passion performance for the Bach Society of Queensland on 23 and 26 March 1986.

== Composition ==
Siddell composed music for the autoharp.

Siddell also wrote the introduction to Betty Beath’s children’s opera, The raja who married an angel.

== Music and faith ==
Siddell’s compositions include liturgical music and settings of sacred text.

His St Cecilia’s Jubilee Mass dates from 1957 and includes the usual components of the Mass (Kyrie, Gloria, Sanctus, Benedictus, Agnus Dei).

In 1994, Siddell published Till the moon fails: thirty two psalm settings, two canticles, an Easter blessing with Alleluia and a hymn, held in the National Library of Australia.

Siddell composed music for Catholic liturgical services (Mass (liturgy) which are still in use for Catholic Mass at the parish of St Ignatius, Toowong, in Brisbane.

He wrote several articles for Brisbane's Liturgy News , and following his death, an "In Memoriam" to Kevin Siddell was published in the same title in 2004.
