= Siddal =

Siddal may refer to:

- Siddal, West Yorkshire, a location in Halifax, West Yorkshire, England
- Siddal A.R.L.F.C., a rugby league team
- Elizabeth Siddal, (1829–1862), Pre-Raphaelite model, poet, and artist
