= Sylvia Siddell =

New Zealand artist (1941–2011)

Sylvia Siddell ONZM
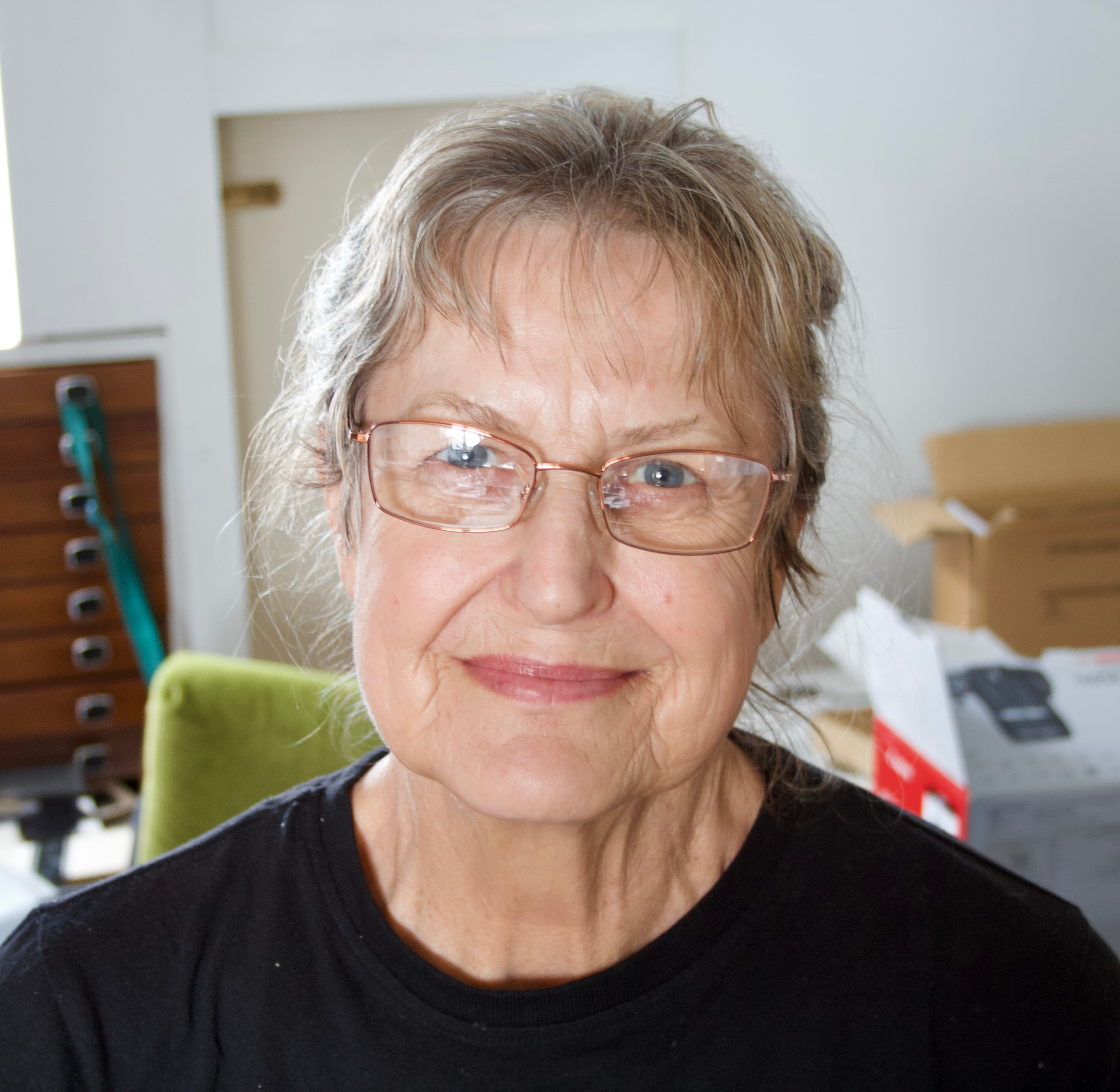
- Sylvia Siddell in her Mount Eden home in 2004
- Born: 1941; Auckland, New Zealand
- Died: 26 August 2011 (aged 69–70); Auckland, New Zealand
- Education: Avondale College, Auckland Post Primary Teachers' College, Auckland University, Auckland Society of Arts, Auckland Technical Institute
- Known for: painting, etching, screen printing, drawing
- Notable work: Fire and Water (2002), Out of the Frying Pan (2007), Sleep of Reason (1984), The Birds, the Bat and the Beast (2006), The Princess began to doubt the Veracity of the Lecherous Amphibian (2008)
- Spouse: Peter Siddell
- Awards: Officer of the New Zealand Order of Merit (ONZM)

Sylvia Grace Siddell, Lady Siddell ONZM (1941 – 26 August 2011) was a New Zealand painter, etcher, and screen-printer, based in Auckland.

== Education ==
Siddell attended the Avondale College (Art teacher: R.N.Field), Auckland Post Primary Teachers' College (1964–65), Auckland University Summer School (1967, tutored by Colin McCahon), night classes at the Auckland Society of Arts (1970, tutored by Louise Henderson), and night classes at the Auckland Technical Institute (1975–76).

== Career ==
Drawing on the tradition of the European vanitas, or allegorical still life, Siddell's work often depicts inanimate, familiar, and ordinary objects, giving them a sense of vibrancy and reflects on the joys, sorrows, struggles, and frustrations of daily existence. Examples of this include her still life paintings, Fire and Water (2002) and Out of the Frying Pan (2007). Her exhibition Couches, at the Artis Gallery in 2005, is another example of how she instilled life and character into ordinary domestic objects, animating them with a sense of personality.

=== Exhibitions ===
From 1975 onward Siddell exhibited regularly throughout New Zealand and her work is held in private and public collections, both in New Zealand and internationally. Notable exhibitions at the Artis Gallery include Fragments of Life (2000), A Rich Life (1998), and Couches (2005).

In 1994 she took part in the exhibition Unruly Practices at Auckland Art Gallery. The project was a series of solo projects by feminist artists living in Auckland, including work by Carole Shepherd, Claudia Pond Eyley, Mary McIntyre, Christine Hellyar.

== Honours and awards ==
In 1983 Siddell was award the Queen Elizabeth II Arts Council Grant to study printmaking and develop etching, lithography and hand painted screen printing techniques.

In the 2002 Queen's Birthday and Golden Jubilee Honours, Siddell was appointed an Officer of the New Zealand Order of Merit, for services to painting.

== Personal life ==
In 1960, she married fellow artist Peter Siddell, and had two daughters, Avril and Emily (also an artist).
