= Peter Siddell =

New Zealand painter (1935–2011)

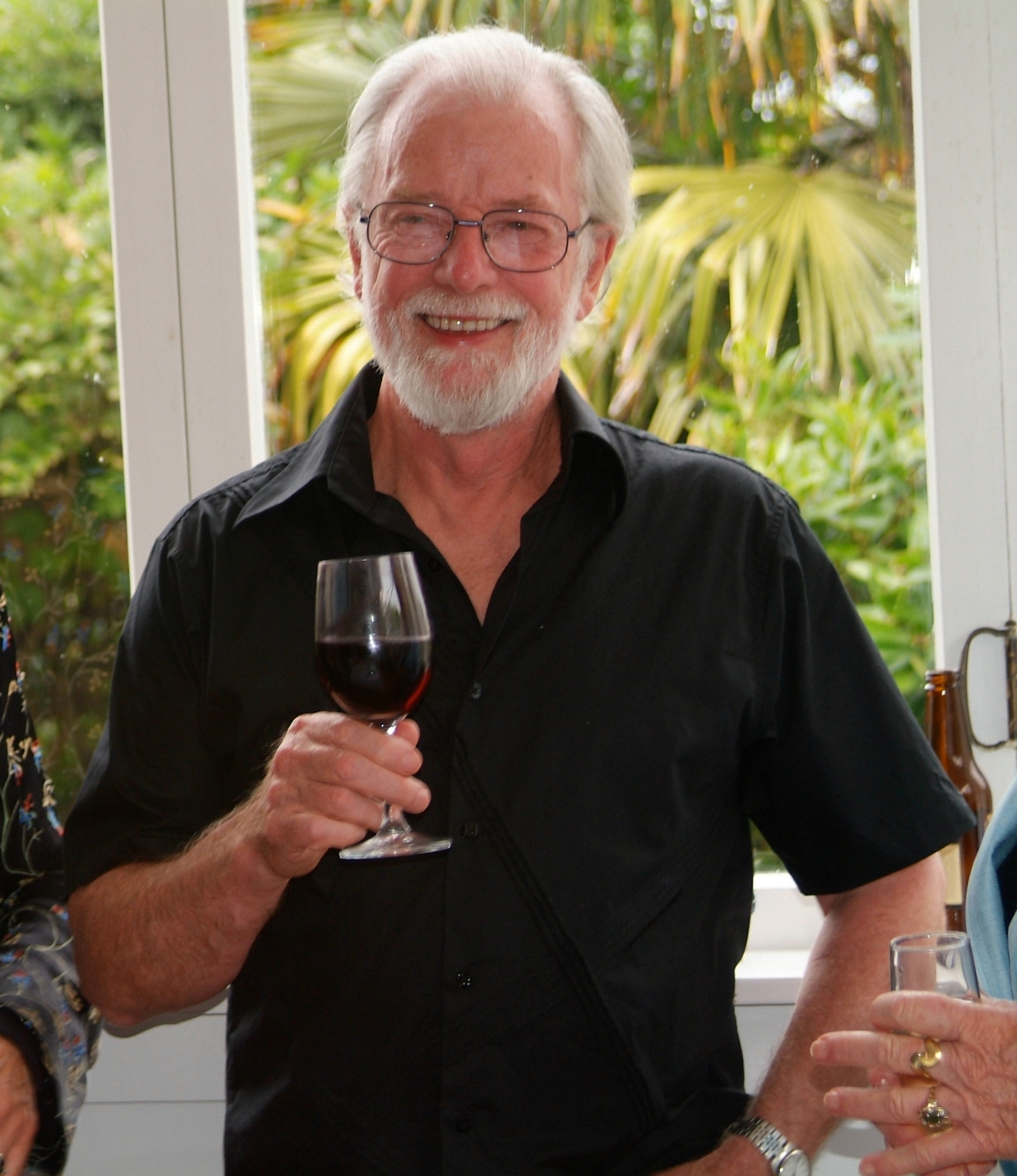
Peter Siddell in his Mount Eden home in 2005

Sir Peter Graham Siddell KNZM QSO (31 July 1935 – 24 October 2011) was a New Zealand artist.

== Biography ==
Siddell was born in Auckland and educated at Mt Albert Grammar School and the Auckland College of Education. In 1960 he married artist Sylvia Siddell, with whom he lived in Auckland. They had two daughters, Avril and Emily (also an artist). Siddell had painted full-time since 1972, when he held his first solo show. Following this, he took part in many exhibitions in both public and commercial galleries.

Many of his artworks depict the hills around Karekare beach in the West Coast of the Waitākere Ranges, as Siddell owned a holiday home at the beach which he built by hand in the early 1970s. The house was partially destroyed in Cyclone Gabrielle in February 2023, and sold by the family.

Siddell's realist paintings are identified mainly with depictions of the environs of Auckland. While his works appear to be records of actual places, his paintings have a subjective component, and might be better described as magic realism than truly realistic. The cityscapes and townscapes in Siddell's paintings are rendered empty, but with the unnerving suggestion of events occurring outside the picture area. In this sense, his work can be compared to the metaphysical works of Giorgio de Chirico.

Siddell's work is held in the permanent collections of all New Zealand major public art galleries, as well as many private, corporate and institutional collections. He was appointed a Companion of the Queen's Service Order for community service in the 1991 New Year Honours, and a Distinguished Companion of the New Zealand Order of Merit for services to art in the 2008 New Year Honours. Following the restoration of titular honours by the New Zealand government in 2009, Siddell accepted re-designation as a Knight Companion of the New Zealand Order of Merit. He was only the second New Zealand artist to be knighted, after Sir Toss Woollaston.

In 2008, Siddell was diagnosed with an inoperable brain tumour.

In February 2011, a comprehensive survey of his art career was published by Random House New Zealand, "The Art of Peter Siddell."

Siddell died in Auckland on 24 October 2011, months after the passing of his wife Sylvia.
