= Emily Siddell =

New Zealand mixed media artist

Emily Siddell (born 1971) is a New Zealand mixed-media artist.

== Life ==
Siddell was born in Auckland, and studied Craft and Design at Carrington Polytechnic (now Unitec) between 1990 and 1992. She was taught by and worked alongside New Zealand glass artist Ann Robinson. British glass artist and jeweller Alan Preston also had a significant influence upon her work.

Siddell works in a variety of different mediums, combining glass casting, weaving, crochet, knitting, sewing and ceramics, drawing upon the Polynesian influences of her Auckland home.

In 2011 she exhibited works at Milford Galleries in Queenstown, entitled Drift. The following year, Elapse showed at FhE Galleries in Auckland.

Her work is held in the collections of The Dowse Art Museum, the Auckland War Memorial Museum and Museum of New Zealand Te Papa Tongarewa.

She is the daughter of artists Peter and Sylvia Siddell.
