= Siddle =

Siddle is a surname. Notable people with the surname include:

- Joe Siddle (1921-2006), American Negro League first baseman
- Peter Siddle (born 1984), Australian cricketer
- Reg Siddle (1906-1995), English footballer
- Takayo Siddle (born 1986), American basketball coach
- Vanessa Siddle Walker (active from 2019), American academic

== See also ==
- John Siddle Williams House, a historic home located at Hermitage, Hickory County, Missouri
