= HMAS Warramunga (I44) =

Tribal-class destroyer of the Royal Australian Navy

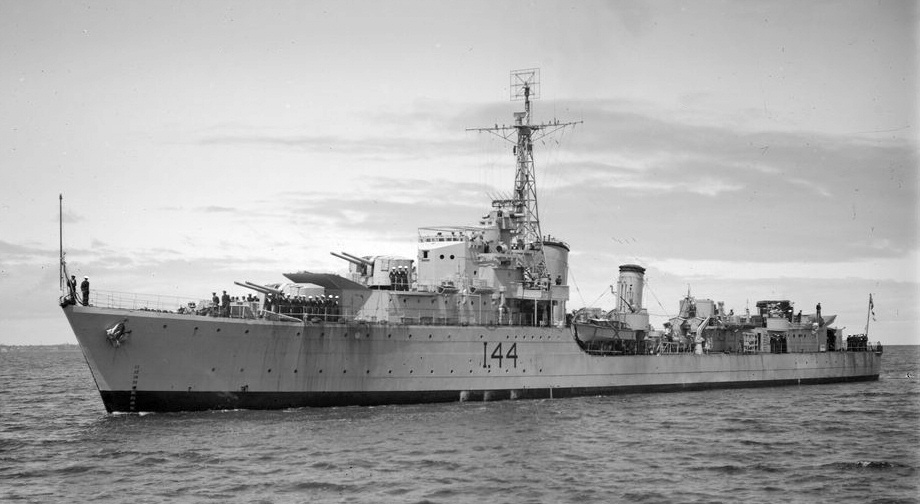
- HMAS Warramunga in 1946

History

Australia
- Namesake: The Warumungu people of Central Australia
- Builder: Cockatoo Docks and Engineering Company
- Laid down: 10 February 1940
- Launched: 7 February 1942
- Commissioned: 23 November 1942
- Decommissioned: 7 December 1959
- Identification: Pennant number: I44 (later D123)
- Motto: Courage in Difficulties
- Honours and awards: Battle honours: Pacific 1943–45; New Guinea 1943–44; Leyte Gulf 1944; Lingayen Gulf 1945; Borneo 1945; Korea 1950–52
- Fate: Sold for scrap on 15 February 1963

General characteristics
- Class & type: Tribal-class destroyer
- Displacement: 2,031 tons
- Length: 377 ft (115 m) length overall; 355 ft (108 m) between perpendiculars
- Beam: 36.5 ft (11.1 m)
- Draught: 9 ft (2.7 m)
- Propulsion: 3 × drum boilers, Parsons impulse-reaction turbines, 44,000 shp (33,000 kW), 2 shafts
- Speed: 36.5 knots (67.6 km/h; 42.0 mph)
- Range: 1,030 nautical miles (1,910 km; 1,190 mi) at 32 knots (59 km/h; 37 mph); 2,840 nautical miles (5,260 km; 3,270 mi) at 8 knots (15 km/h; 9.2 mph)
- Complement: 7 officers, 190 sailors
- Armament: At launch: 6 × 4.7-inch Mark XII guns (3 twin turrets); 2 × 4-inch Mark XVI * guns (1 twin turret); 1 × quad-barrelled 2-pounder Mark VIII pom pom; 6 × 20 mm Oerlikons 1 × quadruple 21 inch (533 mm) torpedo tube set; 1 × depth charge rail

HMAS Warramunga (I44/D123) was a Tribal-class destroyer of the Royal Australian Navy (RAN). Built during World War II, the destroyer entered service in late 1942. She was initially assigned to convoy escort duties, but was assigned to the joint Australian-American Task Force 74 in 1943, and was involved in supporting numerous amphibious landings through the South-east Asian region until the end of the war.

From 1950 and 1952, Warramunga fought in the Korean War, then was converted into an anti-submarine destroyer. Returning to service in 1954, the destroyer was one of the first RAN ships to operate with the Far East Strategic Reserve, and undertook two tours with the organisation before she was decommissioned in 1959 and sold for ship breaking in 1963.

== Description ==
Warramunga was one of three Tribal-class destroyers built for the RAN during World War II. The ship had a displacement of 2,031 tons, a length of 377 feet (115 m) overall and 355 feet (108 m) between perpendiculars, a beam of 36.5 feet (11.1 m), and a mean draught of 9 feet (2.7 m). Propulsion machinery consisted of three drum boilers feeding Parsons impulse-reaction turbines, which supplied 44,000 shaft horsepower (33,000 kW) to the two propeller shafts. The destroyer had a maximum speed of 36.5 knots (67.6 km/h; 42.0 mph). She could travel 1,030 nautical miles (1,910 km; 1,190 mi) at 32 knots (59 km/h; 37 mph) or 2,840 nautical miles (5,260 km; 3,270 mi) at 8 knots (15 km/h; 9.2 mph). The ship's company consisted of 7 officers and 190 sailors.

When she was launched in 1942, the ship's main armament consisted of six 4.7-inch Mark XII guns sited in three twin turrets. This was supplemented by two 4-inch Mark XVI* guns in a single twin turret, a quad-barrelled 2-pounder Mark VIII pom pom, six single 20 mm Oerlikons, a quadruple 21 inch (533 mm) torpedo tube set, and a rail to launch depth charges. During 1945, the six Oerlikons were replaced with six 40 mm Bofors guns, and two depth charge throwers were added. In 1949, half of the torpedo payload and most of the depth charge payload was removed, to allow for the installation of a new motor cutter. In 1952, the aftmost 4.7-inch turret was replaced by a Squid anti-submarine mortar.

== Name, crest, and captains ==
The ship's name comes from the Warumungu First Nations people.

She was nicknamed "Little Mo", assigned in the Korean War when she was the escort destroyer to USS Missouri (BB-63) (1944–1992).

The ship's badge includes a First Nations male about to throw a boomerang, upon a yellow desert hill, into a blue sky. Beneath is the motto "Courage in difficulties".

Notable commanding officers included:

- Commander Emile Dechaineux (1902–1944), first commander commencing November 1942;
- Commander Otto Becher (1908–1977), to January 1951; and
- Commander James Ramsay (1916–1986) from January 1952, taking charge for her second Korean War tour.

== Construction and career ==
Warramunga was laid down by Cockatoo Docks and Engineering Company at its Cockatoo Island Dockyard on 10 February 1940. The destroyer was launched on 7 February 1942 by the wife of Francis Michael Forde, the Minister for the Army. Warramunga was commissioned into the RAN on 23 December 1942, the day after her completion.

=== World War II ===
Warramunga was originally assigned to convoy escort duty between Queensland and New Guinea. During April and May 1943, the destroyer was docked for refit. On completion, she was assigned to Task Force 74, which was operating off the coast of Queensland. In July, the Task Force provided cover for Operation Chronicle, the landings at Kiriwina and Woodlark Islands. After HMAS Hobart was damaged by a Japanese torpedo on 20 July, Warramunga and sister ship HMAS Arunta escorted the cruiser from Espiritu Santo to Sydney. After this, Warramunga escorted two convoys from Townsville to Milne Bay, then a force of US Marines from Melbourne to Goodenough Island. After a refit in Sydney, Warramunga escorted the cruiser HMAS Shropshire to Brisbane, where the two ships joined Task Force 74. On 29 October, Warramunga shelled Gasmata. On 15 December, the destroyer supported the amphibious landings at Arawe. On 26 December, Warramunga was involved in pre-landing bombardments at Cape Gloucester.

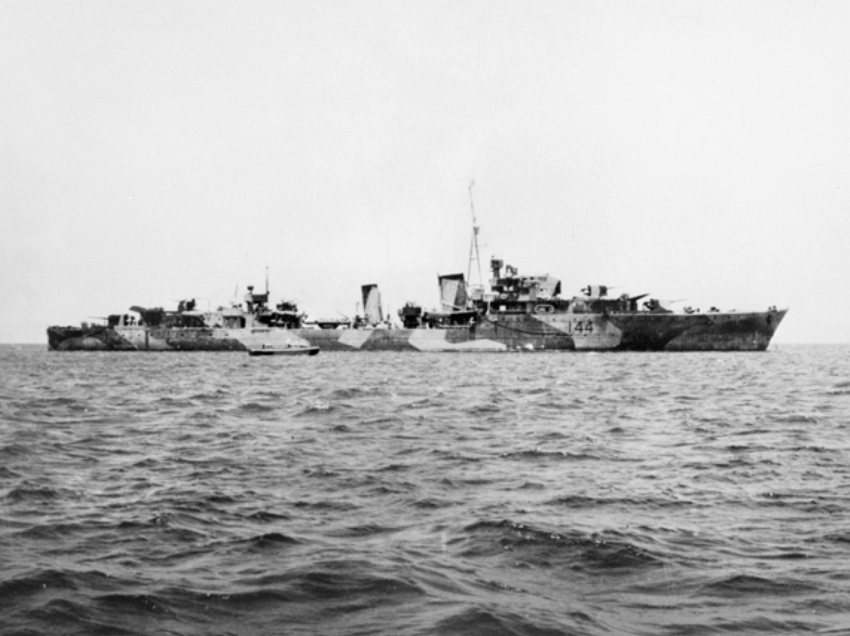
Warramunga in 1944.

At the start of 1944, Warramunga helped cover the Landing at Saidor, before leaving Task Force 74 for refits in Sydney. After rejoining the task fore at the start of February, Warramunga participated in amphibious landings in the Admiralties, at Tanamera Bay, Wakde-Sarmi, and Biak. From May to July, the destroyer was assigned to patrol and escort duties. On 22 July, Warramunga and the cruiser HMAS Australia sailed to Sydney for refits and leave. Returning in August, the destroyer was involved in the Morotai landings on 15 September. Warramunga was part of the covering force for the Leyte landings, and after Australia and USS Honolulu were damaged during the operation, escorted the two cruisers back to port for repairs.

At the start of 1945, while assigned to Manus Island, Warramunga's Oerlikon guns were replaced with Bofors taken from a disabled US Landing Ship Dock. During the invasion of Lingayen Gulf in January, Warramunga was nearly hit by a Japanese kamikaze aircraft, which instead crashed into the destroyer USS Brooks. On 1 May, the destroyer supported the landing at Tarakan, then nine days later participated in landings at Wewak, before sailing to Australia for a two-month refit. On her return to Subic Bay, Warramunga was present for the Japanese surrender of the Philippines. The destroyer then sailed for Japan, and was present in Tokyo Bay on Victory over Japan Day (2 September 1945), when the Japanese Instrument of Surrender was signed. The destroyer earned five battle honours for her wartime service: "Pacific 1943–45", "New Guinea 1943–44", "Leyte Gulf 1944", "Lingayen Gulf 1945", and "Borneo 1945". After the end of World War II, Warramunga assisted in the repatriation of prisoners-of-war, and served four tours of duty with the British Commonwealth Occupation Force. On 28 January 1949, the Warramunga rescued 35 survivors from the Taiping, including the 2 people from the cargo ship Chienyuan. Other passengers were rescued by the fishermen from the Zhoushan Islands. Some survivors were unnamed. One survivor died shortly after being rescued.

The ship was considered the "luckiest damned destroyer afloat" given her war contacts, but little sustained damage. (This "luck" continued into the Korean War.)

=== Korean War ===
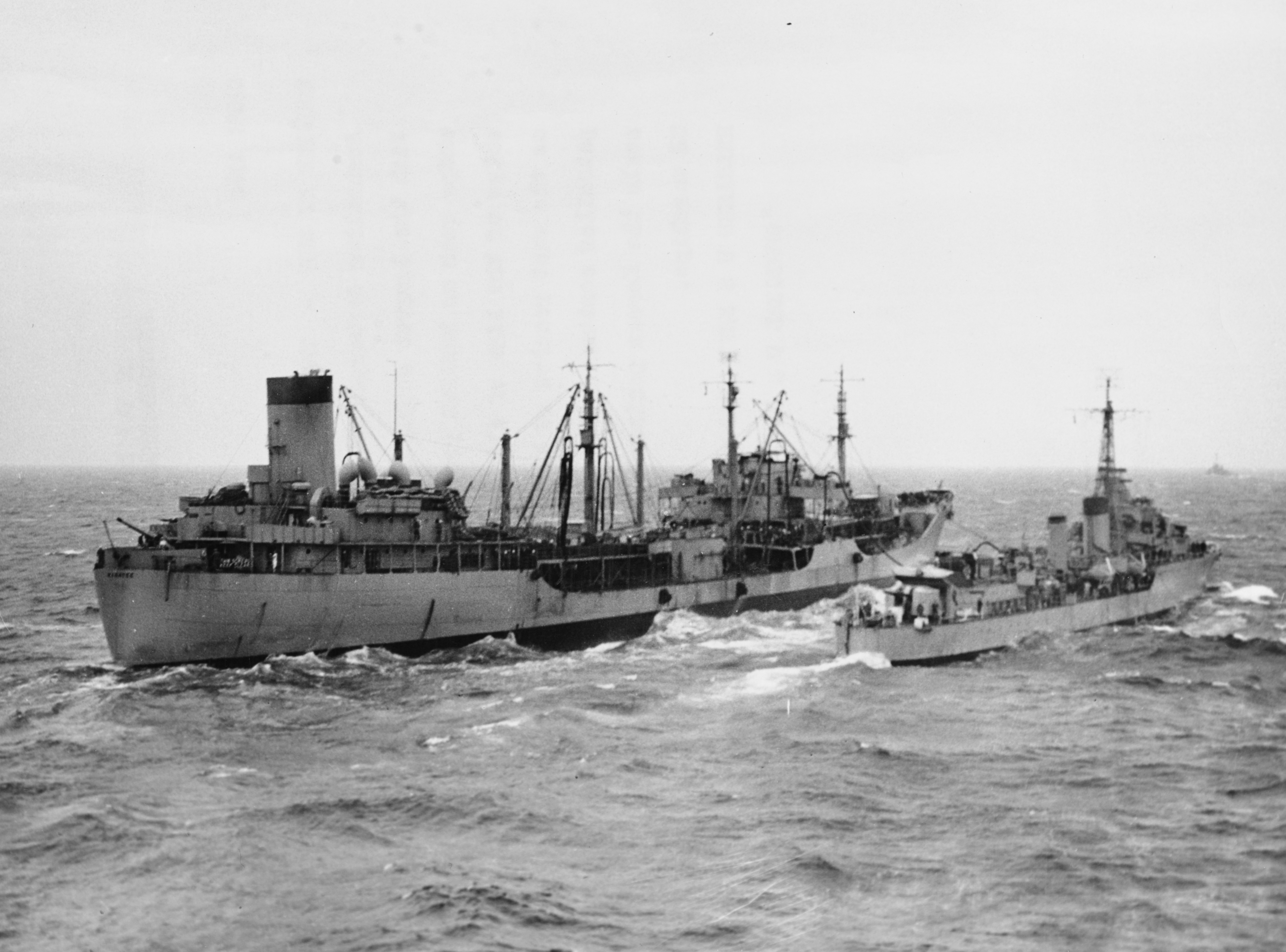
USS Manatee refuels Warramunga during the Korean War on 27 June 1951.

On 6 August 1950, Warramunga sailed to join United Nations forces involved in the Korean War. Most of the ship's first tour consisted of patrols and shore bombardments. In February 1951, Warramunga and the U.S. Navy destroyer USS Wallace L. Lind were sent to recover an intelligence party. En route, it was learned that the party had been captured by the North Koreans, who had set up the extraction to capture the recovery party, and when the two destroyers received the light signal, shelled the area and killed the North Koreans. During May and June, the destroyer underwent repairs for gale damage. On 6 September, she returned to Sydney and docked for refit.

On 11 January 1952, Warramunga sailed for a second Korean War tour. During this second tour, which concluded on 12 August, the ship operated on coastal patrols, and fired 4,151 4.7-inch shells. A sixth battle honour, "Korea 1950–52" was awarded to the destroyer to recognise these deployments. On 12 November, the destroyer docked for conversion into an anti-submarine destroyer, including the replacement of her aft gun turret with a Squid mortar. The vessel had come under fire, going to the aid of two US minesweepers, for which Commodore Ramsay awarded the Distinguished Service Cross and the US Officer of the Legion of Merit.

=== Post-war ===
Warramunga returned to duty in February 1955, and remained in Australian waters until May 1955, when she sailed to the Far East for exercises with the Royal Navy and Royal New Zealand Navy. Warramunga stayed in the area, and became one of the first Australian warships assigned to the Far East Strategic Reserve. She returned on 19 December. In April 1957, the destroyer was involved in South East Asia Treaty Organisation exercises. In 1958, she operated again with the Strategic Reserve.

== Decommissioning and fate ==
Warramunga was paid off to reserve at Sydney on 7 December 1959. The ship was marked for disposal on 22 May 1961. She was sold to Kinoshita and Company Limited on 15 February 1963, and was towed to Japan for ship breaking.

== Tributes ==
Active from about 1947 to at least 2002, there was an Ex-HMAS Warramunga Association, for former crew. By 2021, it may have renamed as the HMAS Warramunga Veterans' Association.

Warramunga Avenue, East Tamworth, New South Wales was named by the area's well-known businessman Bruce Morison Treloar (1926–2014) who served aboard the ship as an ordinary seaman then able seaman in World War II after he joined the navy in late-1944. He also named Arunta Place after the HMAS Arunta (I30) who performed duties alongside the Warramunga, and Eight Bells Way for the duty period. The Warramunga Association also met in Tamworth as part of the 60th anniversary of the ship's commissioning in 2002.
