= List of Royal Navy admirals (1707–current) =

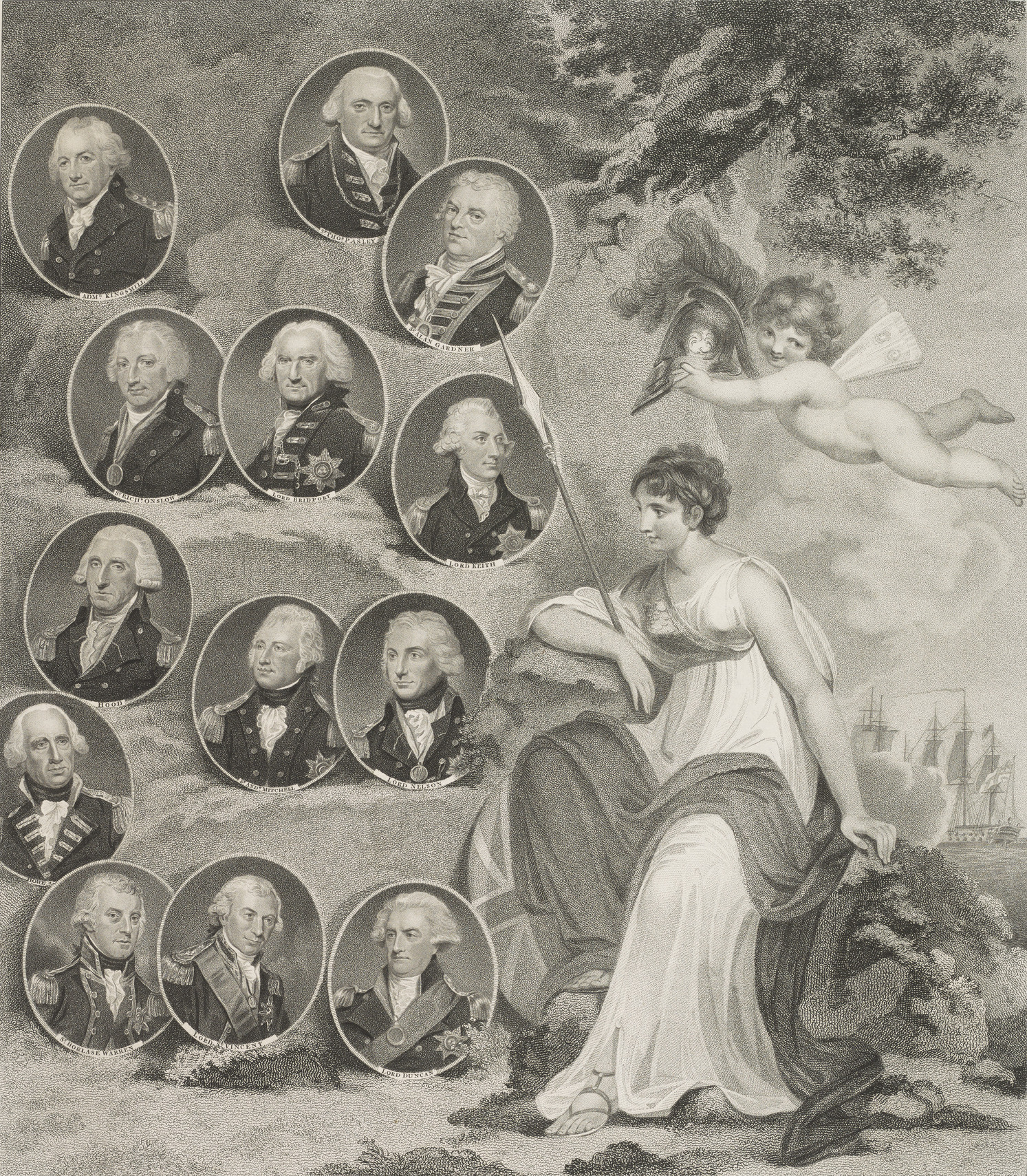
British Admirals. Britannia Viewing the Conquerors of the Seas, 1800

Admiral is a senior rank of the Royal Navy of the United Kingdom, which equates to the NATO rank code OF-9, formally outranked only by the rank admiral of the fleet. The rank of admiral is currently the highest rank to which an officer in the Royal Navy can be promoted, admiral of the fleet being used nowadays only for honorary promotions.

This list aims to include all who have been promoted to the rank of admiral in the Royal Navy of the United Kingdom following the Acts of Union 1707, or to historical variations of that rank (the main article on the rank includes a history of the rank, including the pre-1864 use of colour for admirals of the various squadrons).

Royal Navy officers holding the ranks of rear-admiral, vice-admiral and admiral of the fleet are sometimes considered generically to be admirals. These are not listed here unless they gained the rank of full admiral.

For a very long time, promotion to the ranks above captain was an entitlement of everyone who had become a captain and occurred in strict order of seniority as captain; this was enacted in 1718 and is still evident in Navy Lists of the 1940s. Various stratagems were developed to move those who had seniority over captains who it was actually desired to promote out of the way of the functional promotions, including promotion "without distinction of squadron", "dormant commissions", "superannuation", a variety of pension schemes, a "reserved list", and a "retired list"; these were frequently enacted by Order in Council. Despite being moved off the active list, vice-admirals could still be promoted to admiral after all previously promoted vice-admirals of their category had been promoted or died, whether on an honorific basis or as a means of granting them a pension increase.

Persons listed are shown with the titles they held at the time of their deaths whether or not these were held at the time of their promotion to the rank of full admiral. Those who held the rank of full admiral only on an acting basis are not shown.

== List of admirals ==
Promoted	Name	Born	Died	Notes
26 January 1708	George Byng, 1st Viscount Torrington KB	1663	1733	Senior Naval Lord 1710–1712, 1714–1717 and 1718–1721; promoted to Admiral of the Fleet 1718
17 December 1708	John Jennings	1664	1743	Senior Naval Lord 1721–1727
21 December 1709	Sir John Norris	1670	1749	Senior Naval Lord 1727–1730; promoted to Admiral of the Fleet 1734
20 December 1708	Sir James Wishart	1659	1723	Dictionary of National Biography volume 62 page 253 has an extended discussion of the disputed relative seniority of these 5 promotions; threedecks.org indicates Wishart was dismissed from the Navy in 1715
10 July 1731	Sir Charles Wager	1666	1743	Senior Naval Lord 1730–1733; First Lord of the Admiralty 1733–1742
26 February 1734	Sir George Walton	1665	1739	Retired on pension 1736
2 March 1736	Philip Cavendish	1695	1743	
11 August 1743	Sir John Balchen	1670	1744	Lost at sea with HMS Victory (1737); promoted to Admiral of the White August 1743 from Vice-Admiral of the Red
11 August 1743	Thomas Mathews	1676	1751	Dismissed from the Navy after court-martial
23 June 1744	Nicholas Haddock	1686	1746	
23 June 1744	Sir Chaloner Ogle KB	1681	1750	Promoted to Admiral of the Fleet 1749
23 April 1745	Edward Vernon	1684	1757	Dismissed 1746
7 June 1746	Richard Lestock	1679	1746	
15 July 1747	James Steuart	1678	1757	Promoted to Admiral of the Fleet 1750
15 January 1747	George Clinton	1686?	1761	Promoted to Admiral of the Fleet 1757
15 July 1747	Sir William Rowley KB	1690?	1768	Senior Naval Lord 1751–1756 and 1757; promoted to Admiral of the Fleet 1762
15 July 1747	William Martin	1696?	1756	Retired shortly after promotion
15 July 1747	Isaac Townsend	1685?	1765	Governor of Greenwich Hospital, 1754
12 May 1748	George Anson, 1st Baron Anson	1697	1762	Senior Naval Lord 1749–1751; promoted to Admiral of the Fleet 1761
May 1748	Vere Beauclerk, 1st Baron Vere	1699	1781	Senior Naval Lord 1746–1749; retired 1749
4 June 1756	John Byng	1704	1757	Executed after court-martial
February 1757	Edward Hawke, 1st Baron Hawke	1705	1781	First Lord of the Admiralty 1766–1771; promoted to Admiral of the Fleet 1768
February 1757	Thomas Griffin	1692	1771	
February 1757	Henry Osborn	1694	1771	
February 1757	Thomas Smith	1707	1762	"Retired from active service" October 1758
February 1758	John Forbes	1714	1796	Senior Naval Lord 1761–1763; promoted to Admiral of the Fleet 1781
February 1758	Edward Boscawen PC	1711	1761	Senior Naval Lord 1756–1757 and 1757–1761
December 1760	Sir Charles Knowles, 1st Baronet	1704?	1777	
February 1761	Sir George Pocock KB	1706	1792	Resigned commission 1766
December 1765	George Townshend	1716	1769	
August 1767	Francis Holburne	1704	1771	Senior Naval Lord 1770–1771
October 1770	George Carnegie, 6th Earl of Northesk	1716	1792	
October 1770	Sir Charles Saunders, KB	1715?	1775	Senior Naval Lord 1765–1766; First Lord of the Admiralty 1766
October 1770	Charles Hardy	1716?	1780	
October 1770	Sir Thomas Frankland, 5th Baronet	1718	1784?	
October 1770	Harry Powlett, 6th Duke of Bolton	1720	1794	
June 1773	Sir Thomas Pye	1709?	1785	Some sources say born 1713
March 1775	Sir Francis Geary, 1st Baronet	1709	1796	
January 1778	George Brydges Rodney, 1st Baron Rodney KB	1718	1792	
January 1778	James Young	1717	1789	Rodney and Young were promoted directly to Admiral of the White (The London Gazette 11844)
January 1778	Sir Peircy Brett	1709	1781	Senior Naval Lord 1766–1770
January 1778	Sir John Moore, 1st Baronet	1718	1779	
January 1778	Sir James Douglas, 1st Baronet	1703	1787	
January 1778	George Edgcumbe, 1st Earl of Mount Edgcumbe	1720	1795	
January 1778	Samuel Graves	1713	1787	
January 1778	William Parry	1705	1779	
January 1778	Augustus Keppel, 1st Viscount Keppel	1725	1786	Senior Naval Lord 1766; First Lord of the Admiralty 1782–1783
January 1778	John Amherst	1718	1778	Died 16 days after promotion
September 1780	Matthew Buckle	1716	1784	
September 1780	Robert Man		1783	First Naval Lord 1779–1780
April 1782	Clark Gayton	1712	1785	
April 1782	Sir Robert Harland, 1st Baronet	1715	1784	First Naval Lord 1782–1783
April 1782	Richard Howe, 1st Earl Howe KG	1724	1799	Senior Naval Lord 1763–1765; promoted to Admiral of the Fleet 1796
April 1782	John Montagu	1719	1795	
April 1782	Hugh Pigot	1722	1792	
September 1787	Molyneux Shuldham, 1st Baron Shuldham	1717?	1798	
September 1787	John Vaughan		1789	
September 1787	John Reynolds	1713?	1788	
September 1787	Sir Hugh Palliser, 1st Baronet	1723	1796	
September 1787	Matthew Barton	1715?	1795	
September 1787	Sir Peter Parker, 1st Baronet	1721	1811	Promoted to Admiral of the Fleet 1799
September 1787	Samuel Barrington	1729	1800	
February 1793	Mariot Arbuthnot	1711	1794	
February 1793	Robert Roddam	1719	1808	Headed the list when rank Admiral of the Red was created in November 1805 (The London Gazette 15859 page 1373)
February 1793	William Lloyd	1725	1796	
February 1793	Sir Edward Hughes	1720?	1794	
February 1793	John Evans	1717	1794	
February 1793	Mark Milbanke	1724	1805	
12 April 1794	Nicholas Vincent	1723?	1809	Threedecks.org: "He accepted no commission after his promotion to flag rank"; but was second on 1805 list of Admirals of the Red
12 April 1794	Sir Edward Vernon	1723	1794	
April 1794	Richard Edwards	1715	1795	
April 1794	Thomas Graves, 1st Baron Graves KB	1725	1802	
April 1794	Robert Digby	1732	1815	
April 1794	Benjamin Marlow	1715?	1795	
April 1794	Alexander Hood, 1st Viscount Bridport KB	1726	1814	
April 1794	Sir Chaloner Ogle, 1st Baronet	1726	1816	
April 1794	Samuel Hood, 1st Viscount Hood	1724	1816	First Naval Lord 1789–1795
September 1794	Sir Richard Hughes, 2nd Baronet	1729?	1812	
April 1795	John Elliot	1732	1808	
April 1795	William Hotham, 1st Baron Hotham	1736	1813	
June 1795	Joseph Peyton	1725	1804	
June 1795	John Carter Allen	1724	1800	
June 1795	Charles Middleton, 1st Baron Barham	1726	1813	First Naval Lord 1795; First Lord of the Admiralty 1805–1806
June 1795	John Laforey	1729?	1796	
June 1795	John Dalrymple	1722?	1798	
June 1795	Herbert Sawyer	1730?	1798	
June 1795	Sir Richard King, 1st Baronet	1730	1806	
June 1795	Jonathan Faulknor the elder		1795	Died in the month of his promotion
June 1795	Philip Affleck	1726	1799	
June 1795	John Jervis, 1st Earl of St Vincent, GCB	1735	1823	First Lord of the Admiralty 1801–1804; promoted to Admiral of the Fleet 1821
June 1795	Adam Duncan, 1st Viscount Duncan	1731	1804	
February 1799	Samuel Granston Goodall	????	1801	
February 1799	Richard Brathwaite	1728?	1805	Name as spelled in 1799 gazette but linked references use a variation
February 1799	Phillips Cosby	1729?	1808	
February 1799	Samuel Pitchford Cornish	1739	1816	
February 1799	John Brisbane	????	1807	Not active at flag rank
February 1799	Charles Wolseley	1741	1808	Not active at flag rank
February 1799	William IV of the United Kingdom	1765	1837	Later Admiral of the Fleet (1811) and Lord High Admiral (1827) before becoming King
February 1799	Sir Richard Onslow, 1st Baronet	1741	1817	
February 1799	Sir Robert Kingsmill, 1st Baronet	1730	1805	
February 1799	Sir George Bowyer, 5th Baronet	1740	1800	
February 1799	Sir Hyde Parker	1739	1807	
February 1799	Sir Benjamin Caldwell GCB	1739	1820	
February 1799	Sir William Cornwallis, GCB	1744	1819	
February 1799	William Allen	1728	1804	
February 1799	John Macbride	1735?	1800	
February 1799	George Vandeput	??	1800	
February 1799	Charles Buckner	1735?	1811	
February 1799	John Gell	1740	1806	
February 1799	William Dickson	??	1803	
February 1799	Alan Gardner, 1st Baron Gardner	1742	1809	
February 1799	Robert Linzee	1739	1804	
February 1799	James Wallace	1731	1803	
February 1799	William Peere Williams-Freeman	1742	1832	Retired list; promoted to Admiral of the Fleet June 1830
February 1799	Sir Thomas Pasley, 1st Baronet	1734	1808	
January 1801	Sir Thomas Rich, 5th Baronet	1733?	1803	
January 1801	James Cumming	1738	1808	
January 1801	Sir John Colpoys GCB	1742?	1821	
January 1801	Skeffington Lutwidge	1737	1814	
January 1801	Sir Archibald Dickson, 1st Baronet	??	1803	
January 1801	Sir George Montagu GCB	1750	1829	
January 1801	Thomas Dumaresq	1729	1802	
January 1801	George Keith Elphinstone, 1st Viscount Keith GCB	1746	1823	
April 1802	James Pigott	??	1822	
April 1802	William Waldegrave, 1st Baron Radstock	1753	1825	
April 1804	Thomas Mackenzie	1753	1813	
April 1804	Sir Roger Curtis, 1st Baronet GCB	1746	1816	
April 1804	Sir Henry Harvey KB	1743	1810	Retired list
April 1804	Robert Mann	1748?	1813	Surname spelled "Man" in 1808 gazette
April 1804	Charles Holmes Everitt Calmady	1754	1807	
April 1804	John Bourmaster	1736	1807	
April 1804	Sir George Young	1732	1810	
April 1804	John Henry	1737	1829	
April 1804	Sir Richard Rodney Bligh GCB	1737	1821	
April 1804	Alexander Graeme	1741	1818	
April 1804	George Keppel	?	1804	
November 1805	Isaac Prescott	1737	1830	
November 1805	John Bazely	1740	1809	
November 1805	Sir Thomas Davy Spry	1754	1828	
November 1805	Sir John Orde, 1st Baronet	1751	1824	
November 1805	Sir William Young, GCB	1751	1821	
November 1805	James Gambier, 1st Baron Gambier GCB	1756	1833	First Naval Lord 1795–1801, 1804–1806 and 1807–1808; promoted to Admiral of the Fleet July 1830
November 1805	Sir Andrew Mitchell KB	1757	1806	
November 1805	Charles Chamberlayne	1750	1810	
November 1805	Peter Rainier	1741	1808	
November 1805	Philip Patton	1739	1815	
November 1805	Sir Charles Pole, 1st Baronet	1757	1830	Promoted to Admiral of the Fleet July 1830
April 1808	John Brown	1751	1808	Died four days after promotion
April 1808	John Leigh Douglas	1741	1810	Rear-Admiral of the White; had been promoted to Commander 1777, Captain 1779, Rear-Admiral 1797 and Vice-Admiral 1801
April 1808	William Swiney	1747	1829	
April 1808	Sir Charles Edmund Nugent	1759?	1844	Promoted to Admiral of the Fleet 1833
April 1808	Charles Powell Hamilton	1747	1825	
April 1808	Edmund Dod	1734	1815	
April 1808	Sir Charles Cotton, 5th Baronet	1753	1812	
October 1809	John Thomas	1751	1810	
October 1809	James Brine	1738	1814	
October 1809	Sir Erasmus Gower	1742	1814	
October 1809	John Holloway	1747?	1826	
October 1809	George Wilson	1756	1826	
July 1810	Sir Charles Henry Knowles, 2nd Baronet, GCB	1754	1831	
July 1810	Sir Thomas Pakenham GCB	1757	1836	Not active in Navy after 1795
July 1810	Robert Deans	1740	1815	
July 1810	Sir James Hawkins-Whitshed, 1st Baronet, GCB	1762	1849	Promoted to Admiral of the Fleet 1844
July 1810	Arthur Kempe	1743	1823	
July 1810	Smith Child	1730	1813	
July 1810	Thomas Taylor		1812	
July 1810	Sir John Duckworth, 1st Baronet	1748	1817	
July 1810	Sir Robert Calder, 1st Baronet, KCB	1745	1818	
July 1810	Sir George Cranfield Berkeley GCB	1753	1818	
July 1810	Thomas West		1821	Immediately preceded Douglas on 1814 Navy List
July 1810	James Douglas	1755?	1839	Ranked after Whitshed on 1832 Navy List and after Whitshed and Arthur Kempe on earlier Royal Naval Biography list Rear-Admiral of the Blue, 14 Feb 1799, Rear-Admiral of the White, 1 Jan 1801; Rear-Admiral of the Red, 23 Apr 1804; Vice-Admiral of the White, 9 Nov 1805; Vice-Admiral of the Red, 29 Apr 1808; Admiral of the Blue, 31 Jul 1810; Admiral of the White, 4 Jun 1814; Admiral of the Red, 27 May 1825
July 1810	Peter Aplin	1753	1817	Said by DNB never to have actively served as admiral; ranked immediately after Douglas on 1814 Navy List
July 1810	Henry Savage	1737?	1823	
July 1810	Bartholomew Samuel Rowley	1764	1811	
July 1810	Sir Richard Hussey Bickerton, 2nd Baronet, KCB	1759	1832	First Naval Lord 1808–1812
July 1810	George Bowen		1823?	Will proved 1823 per The National Archives
July 1810	Robert Montagu	1763	1830	Name spelled "Montagu" in most sources but "Montague" is also seen; promoted directly from Vice-Admiral of the White
31 July 1810	John Fergusson	1731	1818	Promoted directly from Vice-Admiral of the White
31 July 1810	Edward Edwards	1742	1815	Promoted directly from Vice-Admiral of the White
31 July 1810	Sir John Borlase Warren, 1st Baronet, GCB	1753	1822	Promoted directly from Vice-Admiral of the White
August 1812	Edward Tyrrell Smith	1752?	1824	"Tyrrell" spelled with one "l" in gazette
August 1812	Sir Thomas Graves, KB	1747	1814	
August 1812	Thomas Macnamara Russell	1743?	1824	
August 1812	Sir Henry Trollope GCB	1756	1839	
August 1812	Sir Henry Edwyn Stanhope, 1st Baronet	1754	1814	
December 1813	Robert McDouall		1816	
December 1813	Billy Douglas	1749	1817	Admiral William (Billy) Douglas, 1749–1817, was Admiral of the Blue Squadron, Port Admiral at Yarmouth and subsequently Chatham, Kent, England. He commanded the Stately 64 in expeditions against the Cape of Good Hope in 1795 and 1796.
December 1813	John Wickey	1750	1833	
December 1813	John Fish	1758	1834	
December 1813	Sir John Knight KCB	1747	1831	
December 1813	Sir Edward Thornbrough GCB	1754	1834	
June 1814	Sampson Edwards	1745	1840	
4 June 1814	Sir George Campbell KCB	1759	1821	
June 1814	Arthur Phillip	1738	1814	
4 June 1814	James Saumarez, 1st Baron de Saumarez GCB	1757	1836	
4 June 1814	Thomas Drury	1750	1832	
4 June 1814	Sir Albemarle Bertie, 1st Baronet KCB	1755	1824	
4 June 1814	William Carnegie, 7th Earl of Northesk	1756	1831	
4 June 1814	James Vashon	1742	1827	
4 June 1814	Edward Pellew, 1st Viscount Exmouth GCB	1757	1833	
4 June 1814	Sir Isaac Coffin, 1st Baronet	1759	1839	
4 June 1814	John Aylmer	1759	1841	
4 June 1814	Samuel Osborne	1754?	1816	Name also spelled "Osborn"
4 June 1814	Richard Boger	1739	1822	Prisoner in 1997 mutinies; promoted to Admiral of the Blue 1814
12 August 1819	John Child Purvis	1747	1825	
12 August 1819	Theophilus Jones	1760	1835	
12 August 1819	Sir William Domett, GCB	1752	1828	First Naval Lord 1812–1813
12 August 1819	William Wolseley	1756	1842	
12 August 1819	Sir John Sutton KCB	1758?	1825	
August 1819	Robert Murray	1763?	1834	
12 August 1819	Sir Alexander Inglis Cochrane, GCB	1758	1832	
12 August 1819	John Markham	1761	1827	
12 August 1819	Sir Henry D'Esterre Darby KCB	1750	1823	
August 1819	Edward Bowater	1753	1829	
August 1819	George Palmer	1755	1834	
August 1819	Sir Eliab Harvey GCB	1758	1830	
August 1819	Sir Edmund Nagle KCB	1757	1830	
July 1821	Sir John Wells GCB	1763?	1841	
July 1821	Sir George Martin GCB	1764	1847	Promoted to Admiral of the Fleet 1846
July 1821	Sir Richard John Strachan, 6th Baronet, GCB	1760	1828	
July 1821	Sir William Sidney Smith GCB	1764	1840	
July 1821	Thomas Sotheby	1759	1831	
July 1821	John Schank	1740?	1823	Name is spelled "Schanck" in gazettes
July 1821	Michael DeCourcy	17??	1824	
May 1825	Sir Henry Nicholls KCB	1758?	1830	
May 1825	Sir Herbert Sawyer KCB	17??	1833	
May 1825	Sir Davidge Gould KCB	1758	1847	
May 1825	Sir Richard Goodwin Keats GCB	1757	1834	
May 1825	Robert Devereux Fancourt	1742	1826	
May 1825	Sir Robert Stopford, GCB, GCMG	1768	1847	
May 1825	Mark Robinson	1754?	1834	
May 1825	Thomas Revell Shivers	1751	1827	
May 1825	John Dilkes	1745?	1827	
May 1825	Sir Thomas Foley GCB	1757	1833	
May 1825	Sir Charles Tyler GCB	1760	1835	
May 1825	Sir Manley Dixon KCB	1760?	1837	
May 1825	George Losack	??	1829	
May 1825	Sir Thomas Bertie	1758	1825	Died weeks after promotion
July 1830	Isaac George Manley	1755	1837	Last survivor of James Cook's circumnavigating crew on Endeavour; did not serve actively in Navy after 1796
July 1830	Edmund Crawley	1755/6	1835	Manley and Crawley were promoted directly to Admiral of the White
22 July 1830	Sir Thomas Williams GCB	1762?	1841	
22 July 1830	Sir William Hargood GCH KCB	1762	1839	
22 July 1830	John Ferrier	1759?	1836	
22 July 1830	Sir Robert Moorsom KCB	1760	1835	
July 1830	Sir Charles Hamilton	1767	1849	
July 1830	Henry Curzon	1765	1846	
July 1830	Sir Lawrence William Halsted GCB	1764	1841	
July 1830	Sir Robert Barlow GCB	1757	1843	Per Royal Naval Biography "superannuated" as a rear-admiral 1823 but per The London Gazette transferred to active list November 1840 as Admiral of the White ranked immediately after Halsted
July 1830	Sir Harry Burrard-Neale, 2nd Baronet GCB GCMG	1765	1840	
July 1830	Sir Joseph Sydney Yorke, KCB	1768	1831	First Naval Lord 1813–1816
July 1830	Sir Arthur Kaye Legge KCB	1766	1835	
July 1830	George Stewart, 8th Earl of Galloway	1768	1834	
July 1830	Sir Francis Laforey, 2nd Baronet, KCB	1767	1835	
July 1830	Sir Philip Charles Calderwood Henderson Durham GCB	1763	1845	
July 1830	Sir Israel Pellew KCB	1758	1832	
July 1830	Sir Benjamin Hallowell Carew GCB	1760	1834	
July 1830	Lord Amelius Beauclerk GCB	1771	1846	
July 1830	William Taylor	1760	1842	
July 1830	Sir Thomas Byam Martin, GCB	1773	1854	Promoted to Admiral of the Fleet 1849
July 1830	Sir John Lawford KCB	1756?	1842	
July 1830	Frank Sotheron	1765	1839	Lawford and Sotheron were promoted directly from Vice-Admiral of the White
January 1837	Charles William Paterson	1756	1841	
January 1837	Sir George Cockburn, 10th Baronet	1772	1853	First Naval Lord 1828–1830, 1834–1835 and 1841–1846; promoted to Admiral of the Fleet 1851
January 1837	James Carpenter	1760	1845	
January 1837	Sir Graham Moore GCB GCMG	1764	1843	
January 1837	Joseph Hanwell	1759	1839	
January 1837	Sir Henry William Bayntun GCB	1766	1840	
January 1837	Sir Richard Lee KCB	1765?	1837	Died months after promotion
January 1837	Sir Peter Halkett, 6th Baronet	1765	1839	
January 1837	Philip Stephens	??	1846	
	William Shield		1842	"Retired captain" in Royal Naval Biography; ranked immediately after Stephens when returned to active list November 1840
January 1837	Charles Elphinstone Fleeming	1774	1840	
January 1837	Sir William Hotham, GCB	1772	1848	
January 1837	Sir Pulteney Malcolm GCB GCMG	1768	1838	
January 1837	Sir John Harvey KCB	1772	1837	
January 1837	Sir Josias Rowley, 1st Baronet	1765	1842	
January 1837	Sir Edward Codrington GCB	1770	1851	
January 1837	Sir George Parker KCB	1767	1847	
	Frederick Watkins	1770	1856	Ranked immediately after Parker when returned to active list in November 1840; pensioned to reserved list 1851
28 June 1838	John Erskine Douglas	1758?	1847	
June 1838	Sir Ross Donnelly KCB	1761?	1840	
28 June 1838	Sir John Beresford, 1st Baronet	1768	1844	
23 November 1841	Thomas Le Marchant Gosselin	1765	1857	
23 November 1841	Sir Charles Rowley, 1st Baronet GCB	1770	1845	
23 November 1841	Sir David Milne, GCB	1763	1845	C-in-C Plymouth 1842–1845
23 November 1841	Sir Robert Waller Otway, 1st Baronet KCB	1770	1846	
23 November 1841	Sir Willoughby Thomas Lake KCB	1773	1847	
November 1841	Sir Charles Ogle, 2nd Baronet	1775	1858	Promoted to Admiral of the Fleet 1857
23 November 1841	Henry Raper	1767	1845	
November 1841	Robert Dudley Oliver	1766	1850	
November 1841	D'Arcy Preston	1764	1847	Per Royal Naval Biography "superannuated" as a rear-admiral in 1819 but per The London Gazette transferred to active list November 1840 ranking after R D Oliver and promoted with him thereafter
November 1841	Man Dobson	1755	1847	
November 1841	Sir John Talbot GCB	1769?	1851	
November 1841	John Giffard	1766	1855	Retired list from 1851
November 1841	Sir John West, GCB	1774	1862	Promoted to Admiral of the Fleet 1858
November 1841	Joseph Bullen	1761	1857	Per Royal Naval Biography "superannuated" as a rear-admiral in 1819 but per The London Gazette transferred to active list November 1840 ranking after West and promoted with him thereafter
November 1841	Stephen Poyntz	1771	1847	
November 1841	John Colville, 9th Lord Colville of Culross	1768	1849	
November 1841	John Cochet	1760	1851	
23 November 1841	Sir Henry Digby GCB	1770	1842	Last four (Digby to Alexander) were promoted directly from Vice-Admiral of the White
23 November 1841	Sir Charles Ekins GCB	1768	1855	
23 November 1841	Benjamin William Page	1765	1845	DNB (first edition) claims promoted in August
23 November 1841	Thomas Alexander	1768?	1843	
9 November 1846	Henry Richard Glynn	1768	1856	
9 November 1846	Sir Edward Hamilton, 1st Baronet	1771	1851	
November 1846	Sir Robert Laurie, 6th Baronet KCB	1764	1848	
November 1846	Sir William Hall Gage GCB	1777	1864	Second Naval Lord 1841–1846; promoted to Admiral of the Fleet 1862
November 1846	Sir Henry Heathcote	1777	1851	
December 1846	Sir Edward Campbell Rich Owen GCB	1771	1849	
January 1847	Sir Graham Eden Hamond, 2nd Baronet, GCB	1779	1862	Promoted to Admiral of the Fleet in 1862
February 1847	Robert Honyman	1765?	1848	
April 1847	Hugh Downman	1765?	1858	
April 1847	Sir Thomas Bladen Capel GCB	1776	1853	
13 May 1847	James O'Brien, 3rd Marquess of Thomond	1769	1855	
June 1847	Richard Matson	1770?	1848	Per Gentleman's Magazine died aged 77 in mid-March; per ADNB had been on half-pay since February 1810
26 July 1847	John MacKellar	1768?	1854	Per Gentleman's Magazine obituary "in the receipt of a full-service pension" at his death
27 December 1847	George Barker			Retired list
8 January 1848	Sir Charles Adam, KCB	1780	1853	First Naval Lord 1834, 1835–1841 and 1846–1847
March 1848	Sir Adam Drummond	1770	1849	
1 June 1848	Sir Thomas Livingstone,7th Baronet	1769	1853	Per 1850 Navy List
1 August 1848	Sir Francis William Austen, GCB	1774	1865	Promoted to Admiral of the Fleet 1863
4 May 1849	Sir John Acworth Ommanney, KCB	1773	1855	
15 September 1849	Zachary Mudge	1770	1852	Reserved half-pay list from January 1852
9 October 1849	Alexander Wilmot Schomberg	1774	1850	
30 October 1849	Edward Durnford King	1771	1862	
24 December 1849	Sir George Mundy KCB	1777	1861	
14 January 1850	James Carthew		1856	Reserved half-pay list from January 1854
1 September 1850	Sir Thomas Briggs GCMG	1780	1852	
21 March 1851	Thomas Cochrane, 10th Earl of Dundonald, GCB	1775	1860	
29 April 1851	Sir William Parker, 1st Baronet, of Shenstone, GCB	1781	1866	First Naval Lord 1846; promoted to Admiral of the Fleet 1863
11 June 1851	George McKinley	1766	1852	Was pensioned at death (Mudge took his place on reserved half-pay list)
8 July 1851	Richard Curry CB		1856?	Reserved half-pay list since before promotion
8 July 1851	Sir John Wentworth Loring KCB	1775	1852	
17 August 1851	Sir Robert Howe Bromley, 3rd Baronet	1778	1857	Noticed in Gentleman's Magazine obituary as Admiral of the White at death, on half-pay since 1809
19 January 1852	John Dick	1778?	1854	Per Gentleman's Magazine obituary died in September aged 76 but if ANBD is right this would mean he joined the RN at the age of 7
30 July 1852	Sir Charles Bullen GCB	1769	1853	
30 July 1852	Christopher John Williams Nesham	1771	1853	Retired on promotion
17 December 1852	John Wight		1860	Reserved half-pay list since before promotion
17 December 1852	William Henry Brown Tremlett	1777	1866	Reserved half-pay list since before promotion
17 December 1852	Sir Samuel Pym KCB	1778	1855	
5 March 1853	Sir George Elliot KCB	1784	1863	
2 April 1853	Lord William FitzRoy KCB	1782	1857	
4 July 1853	Sir Hugh Pigot	1775	1857	
17 September 1853	Edward Hawker	1782	1860	
21 January 1854	Sir James Alexander Gordon GCB	1782	1869	Promoted to Admiral of the Fleet 1868
21 January 1854	Francis Temple			Reserved half-pay list since before promotion
21 January 1854	Henry Gordon			Reserved half-pay List since before promotion
11 September 1854	Richard Darton Thomas	1777	1857	
11 September 1854	Frederick Whitworth Aylmer, 6th Baron Aylmer	1777	1858	Reserved half-pay List
3 July 1855	John Surman Carden	1771	1858	Reserved half-pay List before promotion
July 1855	John Sykes	1774	1858	Some sources say born 1773; Admiral of the White 1857
July 1855	John Impey	1772	1858	Reserved half-pay List before promotion
July 1855	Henry Manaton Ommanney	1778	1857	Reserved half-pay List before promotion
July 1855	Archibald Duff	1773	1858	Reserved half-pay List before promotion
July 1855	Thomas Brown			
9 July 1855	Sir Lucius Curtis, 2nd Baronet KCB	1786	1869	Promoted to Admiral of the Fleet 1864
27 September 1855	Sir John Louis, 2nd Baronet	1785	1863	
3 October 1855	John Ayscough	1780	1863	Rank date from Navy Lists; died Admiral of the Red 1863
31 January 1856	Sir Thomas John Cochrane GCB	1789	1872	Promoted to Admiral of the Fleet 1865
May 1857	Sir George Francis Seymour GCB GCH	1787	1870	Promoted to Admiral of the Fleet 1866
18 June 1857	Anthony Maitland, 10th Earl of Lauderdale KCB KCMG	1785	1863	Per 1859 Navy List (had not yet succeeded to peerage)
18 June 1857	Sir William Beauchamp-Proctor, 3rd Baronet	1781	1861	Promoted on reserved list
18 June 1857	Edward Ratsey	1775?	1867	Promoted on reserved list
9 July 1857	George Cadogan, 3rd Earl Cadogan CB	1783	1864	
9 July 1857	Granville Leveson Proby, 3rd Earl of Carysfort	1782	1868	Reserved half-pay list before promotion
30 July 1857	Sir Edward Tucker GCB	1778	1864	Pensioned under Order in Council of 1851 January 1858
22 August 1857	Sir Edward Chetham Strode KCB	1775	1862	
28 November 1857	Sir William Bowles KCB	1780	1869	Promoted to Admiral of the Fleet 1869
28 November 1857	William Croft	1782	1872	Promoted on reserved list
8 December 1857	Sir James Whitley Deans Dundas, GCB	1785	1862	First Naval Lord 1847–1850
January 1858	Charles Gordon CB			Reserved half-pay List since before promotion
20 January 1858	Sir Henry Hope KCB	1787	1863	
13 February 1858	Sir Fleetwood Broughton Reynolds Pellew CB	1789	1861	
6 March 1858	Sir Charles Napier KCB	1786	1860	
7 May 1858	Bertie Cornelius Cator	1787	1864	Retired list since 1846
7 May 1858	George Ourry Lempriere	1787	1864	Retired list
7 May 1858	Frederick Edward Vernon-Harcourt	1790	1883	Retired list (1869 Navy List page 77 says he did not reach admiral on retired list until 20 May 1862)
7 May 1858	Kenelm Somerville, 17th Lord Somerville	1787	1864	Retired list
25 June 1858	Sir Phipps Hornby GCB	1785	1867	
11 May 1860	Sir Henry Prescott GCB	1783	1874	Retired from June 1860
9 June 1860	Sir Edward Harvey GCB	1783	1865	
June 1860	Edward Wallis Hoare	1778	1870	Promoted on reserved list
June 1860	John Thompson	1776	1864	Retired list since 1846
November 1860	Sir Barrington Reynolds GCB	1786	1861	
1 November 1860	Manley Hall Dixon	1786	1864	Retired list since 1855
November 1860	Alexander Jones			Promoted on reserved list
7 November 1860	Sir Augustus William James Clifford, 1st Baronet CB	1788	1877	Gentleman Usher of the Black Rod (and no longer actively employed by RN) from 1832; retired list 31 March 1866
11 February 1861	Sir George Rose Sartorius, GCB	1790	1885	Promoted to Admiral of the Fleet 1869
February 1861	Sir Watkin Owen Pell	1788	1869	Reserved list
February 1861	William Bowen Mends	1781	1864	Promoted on reserved list (The Edinburgh Gazette 7095 page 260); had been pensioned in 1856
February 1861	George Ferguson	1788	1867	Promoted on reserved list
February 1861	George Le Geyt CB	1777	1861	Retired list before promotion
February 1861	Robert Mitford	1781	1870	Retired list before promotion
February 1861	Henderson Bain	1776	1862	Retired list before promotion
February 1861	Joseph Needham Tayler CB	1785	1864	Retired list before promotion
February 1861	Thomas Edward Symonds	1781	1868	Retired list before promotion
February 1861	Lewis Hole	1779	1870	Retired list before promotion
February 1861	Henry Thomas Davies			Retired list since 1846
11 February 1861	George Gustavus Lennock	1775	1866	Retired list since 1846
29 July 1861	Robert Wauchope	1788	1862	
5 August 1861	Sir John Gordon Sinclair, 8th Baronet	1790	1863	
January 1862	Hayes O'Grady		1864	Reserved half-pay list before promotion
15 January 1862	Maurice FitzHardinge Berkeley, 1st Baron FitzHardinge GCB PC	1788	1867	First Naval Lord 1852 and 1854–1857
January 1862	Robert Gambier	1791	1872	Retired list before promotion
January 1862	Hercules Robinson	1789	1864	Retired list since 1846
January 1862	Thomas Dick			Retired list before promotion
12 April 1862	Sir Fairfax Moresby GCB	1786	1877	Promoted to Admiral of the Fleet 1870
7 May 1862	George William Hughes D'Aeth	1786	1873	Retired list since May 1846 (1869 Navy List page 77 dates this promotion to 4 October following)
7 May 1862	William Ffarington	1777		Retired list since May 1846 (December 1864 Navy List page 74 dates this promotion to 4 October following)
7 May 1862	John Charles Gawen Roberts-Gawen	1787	1874	Retired list since May 1846 (1869 Navy List page 77 dates this promotion to 4 October following)
7 May 1862	Arthur Philip Hamilton	1787	1877	Retired list since May 1846 (1869 Navy List dates this promotion to 4 October following)
7 May 1862	James Rattray	1790		Retired list since May 1846
7 May 1862	Charles Warde KH	1786		Retired list since May 1846
20 May 1862	George Byron, 7th Baron Byron	1789	1868	Reserved list
20 May 1862	Sir Charles Sullivan, 3rd Baronet	1789	1862	
16 June 1862	Francis Erskine Loch	1788	1868	
June 1862	Edward Saurin			Retired list
4 October 1862	Sir Arthur Fanshawe KCB	1794	1864	
4 October 1862	Edward Collier CB	1782	1873	Reserved list since 1857
4 October 1862	Algernon Percy, 4th Duke of Northumberland, KG	1792	1865	Reserved list
4 October 1862	John Carter	1785	1863	Reserved list
4 October 1862	Henry Meynell	1789	1865	Reserved list
10 November 1862	Sir Houston Stewart, GCB	1791	1875	Promoted to Admiral of the Fleet 1872
November 1862	Augustus Baldwin			Retired list before promotion
November 1862	Henry Colins Deacon			Retired list before promotion
22 November 1862	Sir James Stirling, Kt	1791	1865	
November 1862	William Bateman Dashwood			Retired list before promotion
November 1862	Martin White			Retired list before promotion
2 March 1863	Sir Provo William Parry Wallis, GCB	1791	1892	Promoted to Admiral of the Fleet 1875
March 1863	George James Perceval, 6th Earl of Egmont	1794	1874	Reserved half-pay list by 1869
23 March 1863	Sir George Augustus Alexander Westphal	1785	1875	Retired list
March 1863	John Gordon			Retired list before promotion
7 April 1863	John William Montagu	1790	1882	Retired list since before promotion (1869 Navy List page 77 dates this promotion to the 27th following)
April 1863	George Cornish Gambier			Retired list
April 1863	Sir Charles Burrard, 2nd Baronet	1793	1870	Retired list
April 1863	Thomas Ladd Peake			Retired list since before promotion
27 April 1863	Sir Henry William Bruce KCB	1792	1863	
27 April 1863	Benedictus Marwood Kelly	1795	1867	Reserved list
27 April 1863	Sir Charles Parker, 5th Baronet	1792	1869	Reserved list
27 April 1863	Sir James Hanway Plumridge KCB	1788?	1863	
27 April 1863	John Edward Walcott CBE	1790	1868	Reserved list
April 1863	William Walpole			Pensioned under 1851 Order in Council since 1858
April 1863	William James Mingaye	1784	1865	Pensioned under 1851 Order in Council since 1858
7 May 1863	Sir Alexander Dundas Young Arbuthnott	1789	1871	Retired list (1869 Navy List page 77 dates this promotion to 30 November following)
7 May 1863	William Hotham, KH	1794	1873	Retired List (1869 Navy List page 77 dates this promotion to 30 November following)
7 May 1863	James Montagu	1791	1872?	Retired List since 1846; DNB says died 1868
6 June 1863	Honourable Henry John Rous	1795	1877	Retired list 31 March 1866
June 1863	Henry Theodosius Browne Collier			Retired list before promotion
June 1863	Henry Stanhope			Retired list before promotion
June 1863	John Townsend Coffin			Retired list before promotion
24 September 1863	Thomas Ball Clowes	1787	1864	Retired List since 1846
24 September 1863	George Frederick Rich	1787	1863	Reserved list
24 September 1863	Sir William Hope-Johnstone KCB	1798	1878	Retired list April 1870
14 November 1863	Sir William Fanshawe Martin, 4th Baronet, GCB	1801	1895	First Naval Lord 1858–1859; retired list from April 1870
14 November 1863	James Ryder Burton	1795	1876	Reserved list
November 1863	William Henry Smyth	1788	1865	Retired list since 1846
November 1863	Richard Saumarez	1791	1864	Retired list
30 November 1863	Sir Montagu Stopford, KCB	1798	1864	Retired February 1864
3 December 1863	Sir Henry Ducie Chads GCB	1788	1868	
3 December 1863	Charles Yorke, 4th Earl of Hardwicke	1799	1873	Retired list
December 1863	Sir George Robert Lambert GCB	1795	1869	Pensioned from March 1864
December 1863	James Gore			Retired before promotion (1869 Navy List page 77 shows a retired list Admiral JOHN Gore with this date of promotion)
11 January 1864	Charles Abbot, 2nd Baron Colchester, PC	1798	1867	Reserved list
11 January 1864	William Abraham Keats	1794	1874	Reserved list
11 January 1864	Sir Henry John Leeke KCB KH	1794	1870	Third Naval Lord 1859
9 February 1864	Thomas Martin	1787	1868	Reserved list
February 1864	Henry Edwards			Reserved list
9 February 1864	Sir Charles Howe Fremantle GCB	1800	1869	
5 March 1864	Sir Michael Seymour GCB	1802	1887	Retired list from April 1870
June 1864	Richard Augustus Yates			Promoted on the reserved list
June 1864	Charles Grenville Randolph			Promoted on the reserved list
June 1864	Edward Richard Williams			Promoted on the reserved list
15 June 1864	Sir Henry Byam Martin KCB	1803	1865	
15 June 1864	John Pakenham	1790	1876	Promoted on retired list "to have the rank and title expressed against their names, but without increase of pay"
15 June 1864	Henry Litchfield	1786	1864	See note on John Pakenham
15 June 1864	William Webb	1796	1866	See note on John Pakenham
16 September 1864	Henry Eden	1798	1888	Retired list from April 1870
September 1864	Robert Patton			Retired list
20 February 1865	Sir James Scott KCB	1790	1872	Retired list 31 March 1866
24 April 1865	Sir Frederick William Grey GCB	1805	1878	First Naval Lord 1861–1866
24 April 1865	Charles Gordon			Retired list
5 May 1865	Sir Robert Lambert Baynes KCB	1796	1869	
12 September 1865	Thomas Bennett	1785	1870	Pensioned November 1863 under 1851 Order in Council
12 September 1865	Sir Henry Smith KCB	1803	1887	Pensioned November 1865 under 1851 Order in Council
12 September 1865	Follett Walrond Pennell	1804	1876	Reserved half-pay list
12 September 1865	William Alexander Baillie-Hamilton	1803	1881	Retired since 1855
12 September 1865	Sir Charles Elliot KCB	1801	1875	Reserved list; received flag rank promotions while diplomat and colonial administrator
12 September 1865	Henry Gosset	1795	1877	Reserved list
12 September 1865	Edward Purcell	1795?	1870	Reserved list
12 September 1865	Sir Peter Richards, KCB	1787	1869	Reserved list
12 September 1865	Joseph O'Brien	1790	1865	Reserved List
12 September 1865	Russell Henry Manners	1800	1870	Retired list
12 September 1865	James Thorne			Retired list
12 September 1865	Theobald Jones, FLS	1790	1868	Retired list
2 December 1865	John Alexander Duntze	1806	1882	Retired list from April 1870
December 1865	Sir Stephen Lushington GCB	1803	1877	
2 April 1866	Charles Ramsay Drinkwater Bethune CB	1802	1884	Retired list from April 1870
2 April 1866	Sir Thomas Hastings KCB	1790	1870	Retired list since March 1866
2 April 1866	John Lyons	1787	1872	Promoted to Admiral on reserved list
2 April 1866	Sir Frederick Thomas Michell KCB	1788	1873	Retired list since March 1866
2 April 1866	George Scott	1783		Promoted to Admiral on reserved list
2 April 1866	Edward Sparshott KH	1788	1873	Promoted to Admiral on reserved list; pensioned since 1846
2 April 1866	Sir Charles Talbot KCB	1801	1876	
2 April 1866	John Wyatt Watling	1786	1867	Promoted to Admiral on reserved list
2 April 1866	Philip Westphal	1782	1880	Promoted to Admiral on reserved list; retired from 1847
2 April 1866	James Wigston			Promoted to Admiral on reserved list
2 April 1866	John Wilson			Promoted to Admiral on reserved list
20 November 1866	Sir Thomas Sabine Pasley, 2nd Baronet	1804	1884	Retired list from April 1870
March 1867	Lord George Paulet	1803	1879	Retired list
20 March 1867	Lord Edward Russell CB	1805	1887	Retired list from April 1870
March 1867	Sir Burton Macnamara	1794	1876	Reserved half-pay list
18 October 1867	Henry Wolsey Bayfield	1795	1885	Retired list since March 1866
18 October 1867	George Grey	1809	1891	Retired ist since 1866; Bath King of Arms
October 1867	Arthur Duncombe	1806	1889	Reserved list
October 1867	Charles Henry Swinburne	1797	1877	Promoted on reserved list
October 1867	Sir Joseph Nias KCB	1793	1879	Promoted on retired list
October 1867	Sir George Back	1796	1878	Promoted on retired list
18 October 1867	Sir Henry John Codrington KCB	1808	1877	Promoted to Admiral of the Fleet 1877
October 1867	Henry Shovell Jones Marsham	1794	1875	Gazette: "to have the rank of Retired Admirals, under the provisions of Her Majesty's Order in Council of 7th May, 1858."
October 1867	Charles Crowdy	1786	1870	Gazette note as with Marsham above
October 1867	Thomas Mansel	1783	1869	Gazette note as with Marsham above
October 1867	James Burney	1794	1884	Gazette note as with Marsham above
8 April 1868	Thomas Maitland, 11th Earl of Lauderdale GCB	1803	1878	Promoted to Admiral of the Fleet 1877
8 April 1868	John Rivett-Carnac	1796	1869	Promoted on reserved list
April 1868	Michael Quin			Pensioned since March 1864 under 1851 Order in Council
April 1868	Lord John Frederick Gordon Hallyburton	1799	1878	Reserved half-pay list
April 1868	Robert Contart M'Crae			Reserved half-pay list
April 1868	John Balfour Maxwell	1799	1874	Reserved half-pay list
April 1868	William Slaughter			Retired list
April 1868	Thomas Gill			Retired list
15 January 1869	Sir Robert Smart KCB	1796	1874	C-in-C, Mediterranean Fleet 1863–1966; retired list from April 1870
January 1869	William Hargood	1801	1888	Promoted on reserved list
26 May 1869	Sir George Rodney Mundy GCB	1805	1884	Promoted to Admiral of the Fleet 1877; retired
July 1869	Henry Ommanney Love			Retired list
July 1869	William Sydney Smith			Reserved list by 1873; on Navy List as William Sydney Smith & on ANBD as William Sidney Smith but is not the earlier namesake above
12 July 1869	Sir Henry Keppel, GCB, OM	1809	1904	Promoted to Admiral of the Fleet 1877; retired 1879
September 1869	John Elphinstone Erskine	1806	1887	Retired list from July 1871
September 1869	George Augustus Eliott	1799	1872	Promoted on reserved list
September 1869	Brunswick Popham	1805	1878	Promoted on reserved list
September 1869	Thomas Ogle			Promoted on reserved list
September 1869	George Evans			Promoted on reserved list
September 1869	Frederick Bullock	1788	1874	Promoted on reserved list; pensioned since November 1864 under 1851 Order in Council
10 September 1869	Russell Eliott	1802	1881	Promoted on reserved list
10 September 1869	John Frederick Appleby	1795	1878	Retired list
10 September 1869	George Charles Blake			Retired list
10 September 1869	Sir John Kingcome KCB	1793	1871	Retired list since 1866
10 September 1869	Alfred Luckraft	1792	1871	Retired list
10 September 1869	John Jervis Tucker	1802	1886	Reserved list; had been pensioned under 1851 Order in Council since October 1864
21 January 1870	Sir James Hope GCB	1808	1881	Retired list from 1878; promoted to Admiral of the Fleet 1879
27 February 1870	Sir Baldwin Wake Walker, 1st Baronet, KCB, CMG	1802	1876	Retired list from April 1870
February 1870	Edward Stanley	1798	1878	Reserved half-pay list
1 April 1870	Sir Alexander Milne, 1st Baronet GCB	1806	1896	First Naval Lord 1866–1868 and 1872–1876; retired list 1876; promoted to Admiral of the Fleet 1881
1 April 1870	Lord Clarence Edward Paget GCB	1811	1895	Retired list from 1876
1 April 1870	Richard Laird Warren	1806	1875	
1 April 1870	Sir George Augustus Elliot KCB	1813	1901	
1 April 1870	Sir Sydney Colpoys Dacres, GCB	1805	1884	First Naval Lord 1868–1872; retired list from 1874
1 April 1870	Plantagenet Pierrepoint Cary, 11th Viscount Falkland	1806	1886	Reserved list
1 April 1870	Robert Craigie	1800	1873	Reserved list
1 April 1870	Richard Crozier	1803	1880	Reserved list
1 April 1870	Edward Howard, 1st Baron Lanerton	1809	1880	Reserved list
1 April 1870	John Bunch Bonnemaison M'Hardy	1801	1882	Reserved list
14 July 1871	George Hathorn	1803	1876	Reserved list 1871 and apparently retired by 1859
14 July 1871	Sir Lewis Tobias Jones GCB	1797?	1895	Retired list since 1870; may have been born 1799
14 July 1871	Robert Fanshawe Stopford	1811	1891	Retired list since 1870
July 1871	Sir Robert Spencer Robinson	1809	1889	Retired list since 1870
July 1871	Sir Thomas Matthew Charles Symonds GCB	1813	1894	Promoted to Admiral of the Fleet in 1879; retired from 1883
October 1872	Thomas Leeke Massie	1802	1898	Retired list since 1866
October 1872	Sir Edward Belcher KCB	1799	1878	
October 1872	Woodford John Williams	1809	1892	Retired list since April 1870
October 1872	Sir Augustus Kuper GCB	1809	1885	Retired by 1883
October 1872	Patrick John Blake			Promoted on reserved list
20 October 1872	Talavera Vernon Anson	1809	1895	Promoted on reserved list
8 February 1873	Sir Charles Gilbert John Brydone Elliot KCB	1818	1895	Promoted to Admiral of the Fleet 1881; retired 1888
February 1873	Sir Charles Eden KCB	1808	1878	Retired list since 1870
20 April 1875	Sir George St. Vincent Duckworth-King, 4th Baronet KCB	1804	1891	Retired from 1877
30 July 1875	Sir Hastings Yelverton GCB	1808	1878	First Naval Lord 1876–1877
30 July 1875	Joseph Sherer			Reserved half-pay list
July 1875	James Beckford Lewis Hay	1797	1892	Retired from 1862; promoted on reserved list
July 1875	Sir Edward Alfred John Harris KCB	1808	1888	Reserved list from 1877 (Navy List dates rank as above but DNB says promoted on reserved list 1877)
July 1875	William Ward Percival Johnson		1880	Reserved half-pay list; retired since 1862
July 1875	Keith Stewart CB	1814	1879	Reserved half-pay list; retired since 1862
July 1875	John Hallowes			Reserved half-pay list
July 1875	Andrew Drew	1792	1878	Reserved half-pay list
July 1875	Henry Stroud	1797?	1892	Retired by 1862 (implied 1850 in obituary)
July 1875	John Baker Porter Hay			Retired
July 1875	George Goldsmith CB	1806	1888	Retired list
July 1875	Charles Frederick	1797	1875	Retired list since 1869
July 1875	William Henry Anderson Morshead CB	1811	1886	Retired list since April 1870
July 1875	Sir Richard Collinson KCB	1811	1883	Retired list
July 1875	George Ramsay, 12th Earl of Dalhousie	1806	1880	Promoted on retired list
December 1875	Sir William Hutcheon Hall KCB	1797?	1878	Retired list
December 18758	Sir George Greville Wellesley GCB	1814	1901	First Naval Lord 1877–1879
18 June 1876	Sir Edward Gennys Fanshawe, GCB	1814	1906	retired 1879
18 June 1876	Swynfen Thomas Carnegie	1813	1879	Retired list since 1873
June 1876	Arthur Lowe	1814	1882	Retired list since April 1870
June 1876	Richard Henry Stopford	1803	1895	Reserved list; retired since 1863
June 1876	James Paterson Bower	1806	1889	Reserved list; retired 1863
22 January 1877	Sir Claude Henry Mason Buckle KCB	1803	1894	Retired list since 1870 and pensioned 1885
22 January 1877	Thomas Baillie	1811	1889	
22 January 1877	Sir George Giffard KCB	1815	1895	Retired list since 1 April 1870
22 January 1877	Sir Frederick William Erskine Nicolson, 10th Baronet, CB	1815	1899	
22 January 1877	Sir James Robert Drummond, GCB	1812	1895	Retired from September 1877; later Gentleman Usher of the Black Rod
January 1877	Sir Bartholomew James Sulivan, KCB	1810	1890	Reserved list; retired from 1863
January 1877	Sir George Nathaniel Broke-Middleton, 3rd Baronet CB	1812	1887	Reserved list
1 August 1877	Sir James Crawford Caffin	1812	1883	Retired list since before promotion
August 1877	Sir William Loring KCB	1811	1895	Retired list from November 1881
August 1877	John Lort Stokes	1811	1885	Retired list since April 1870
August 1877	Sir Henry Mangles Denham	1800	1887	Retired list since 1871
August 1877	Arthur Forbes	1807	1891	Retired list
August 1877	Frederick Henry Hastings Glasse			Retired list
August 1877	George Thomas Gordon			Retired list
August 1877	Sir Alexander Leslie Montgomery, 3rd Baronet	1807	1888	Reserved list
August 1877	Edward Plunkett, 16th Baron of Dunsany	1808	1889	Reserved list
August 1877	Cospatrick Baillie Hamilton	1817	1892	Reserved list; retired from 1865
August 1877	Robert Tryon	1811?	1890	Reserved list; retired from 1865
August 1877	Erasmus Ommanney	1814	1904	Retired list since 1875
August 1877	George William Douglas O'Callaghan CB	1811	1900	Retired list since April 1870
August 1877	Thomas Pickering Thompson	1811	1892	Retired list
August 1877	Wallace Houstoun	1811	1891	Retired list since April 1870; surname variantly spelled Houston but "Houstoun" is on Navy List
August 1877	Sir William John Cavendish Clifford, 2nd Baronet	1814	1882	Retired list
August 1877	Thomas Fisher		1891	Retired list since 1866
August 1877	Robert Fitzgerald Gambier	1803	1885	Retired since 1864
August 1877	Sir Cornwallis Ricketts, 2nd Baronet	1803	1885	Retired as a Captain before later promotions
August 1877	William Louis	1810	1887	Retired as Captain before later promotions
August 1877	Courtenay Osborne Hayes	1812	1892	Retired as a Captain before later promotions
August 1877	William Knighton Stephens	1814	1897	Retired as a Captain before later promotions
August 1877	William Windham Hornby	1812	1899	Retired as a Captain before later promotions
August 1877	Charles George Edward Patey	1811?	1881	Retired list since 1864
August 1877	Sir Alfred Philipps Ryder KCB	1820	1888	Promoted to Admiral of the Fleet 1885
August 1877	John Fulford	1809	1888	Retired list since April 1870
September 1877	Sir Henry Chads KCB	1819	1906	Retired list from 1884
March 1878	Sir Arthur Farquhar KCB	1815	1908	Retired list from 1880
March 1878	John Hay			Retired since 1866; it is not clear which of the three John Hays in A Naval Biographical Dictionary apart from a Lord John Hay who died a rear-admiral in 1851 and was uncle of the Lord John Hay below is the John Hay found as a retired admiral of this date on later Navy Lists
March 1878	Robert Kerr		1886	Retired since 1866
March 1878	Sir Astley Cooper Key, GCB, PC	1821	1888	First Naval Lord 1879–1885; retired list 18 January 1886
March 1878	Edwin Clayton Tennyson-d'Eyncourt CB	1813	1903	Retired list since 1870
March 1878	Thomas Henry Mason CB	1811	1900	
March 1878	Sir John Charles Dalrymple-Hay, 3rd Baronet, GCB	1821	1912	Retired list since 1870
March 1878	Hugh Dunlop CB	1806	1887	Retired list since April 1870
September 1878	Frederick Montresor	1811	1887	Retired list since April 1870
September 1878	Edward Codd	1804	1887	Retired list since 1867
September 1878	Sir Charles Farrell Hillyar KCB	1817	1888	retired list from 1882
September 1878	Arthur William Jerningham	1807	1889	Retired list since 1864
June 1879	Sir Geoffrey Thomas Phipps Hornby GCB	1825	1895	Admiral of the Fleet 1888
June 1879	Sir Edward Southwell Sotheby	1813	1902	Retired list since April 1870
June 1879	Lord Frederick Herbert Kerr	1818	1896	Retired list since April 1870
June 1879	Sir William Robert Mends, GCB	1812	1897	
June 1879	Henry Harvey	1812	1887	Retired as a Captain 1866 before later promotions
August 1879	Sir Charles Frederick Alexander Shadwell KCB	1814	1886	Retired list
August 1879	Sir William King Hall KCB	1816	1886	
August 1879	Edmund Gardiner Fishbourne CB	1811	1887	Retired as Captain before later promotions
August 1879	Thomas Chaloner CB	1815	1884	Retired as a Captain before later promotions
November 1879	Sir Edward Augustus Inglefield KCB	1820	1894	Retired list from 1885
November 1879	Thomas Wilson CB	1811	1894	Retired list since 1870
November 1879	Colin Yorke Campbell		1893	Retired as a Captain before later promotions
January 1880	Sir William Edmonstone, 4th Baronet, CB	1810	1888	
January 1880	James Newburgh Strange	1812	1894	Retired list since April 1870
January 1880	James Charles Prevost	1810	1891	Retired list since April 1870
January 1880	Sir Arthur Cumming KCB	1817	1893	Retired list from 1882
January 1880	Nicholas Lefebvre	1793	1881	Retired as Captain 1864 and later promoted on retired list
January 1880	William Compton, 4th Marquess of Northampton KG	1818	1897	Retired as Captain 1856 and later promoted on retired list
January 1880	Henry Richard Foote	1817	1885	Retired as a Captain before later promotions
January 1880	James Stoddart	1813	1892	Retired as a Captain before later promotions
January 1881	Robert Coote CB	1820	1898	Retired list since before promotion
November 1881	Sir William Houston Stewart GCB	1822	1901	Retired list from 1885
December 1881	Sir Arthur Auckland Leopold Pedro Cochrane, KCB	1824	1905	Retired list 22 June 1886
May 1882	Frederick Beauchamp Paget Seymour, 1st Baron Alcester, GCB	1821	1895	Second Naval Lord 1883–1885
June 1882	John Welbore Sunderland Spencer	1816	1888	Retired list since 1871
June 1882	Sir Reginald John James George Macdonald, KCB, KCSI	1820	1899	Retired list 7 July 1884
July 1884	Sir George Henry Richards KCB	1820	1896	Retired list since 1877 (possibly 1874)
7 July 1884	Sir Francis Leopold McClintock, KCB	1819	1907	Retired list 8 July 1884, the day after promotion
8 July 1884	Lord John Hay, GCB	1827	1916	First Naval Lord 1886; promoted to Admiral of the Fleet 1888; retired 1892
8 July 1884	Henry Schank Hillyar, CB	1819	1893	Retired list since before promotion
8 July 1884	George Granville Randolph, CB	1818	1907	Retired list since before promotion
July 1884	Sir Leopold George Heath, KCB	1817	1907	Retired list since 1873
October 1884	Francis Egerton	1824	1895	Retired list since 1875
October 1884	Sir Edward Bridges Rice KCB	1819	1902	Retired list three days after promotion
October 1884	Richard Aldworth Oliver	1811	1889	Retired as a Captain 1864 before later promotions
October 1884	George Parker			Retired as a Captain by 1872 before later promotions
October 1884	Edward Philips Charlewood	1813	1894	Retired as a Captain before later promotions
October 1884	Arthur Mellersh CB	1812	1894	Retired as a Captain 1864 before later promotions
October 1884	Sir Augustus Phillimore, KCB	1822	1897	Retired list from 1887
October 1884	Thomas Miller	1819	1899	Retired list
October 1884	George Disney Keane CB	1817	1891	Retired list since 1877
October 1884	Vincent Amcotts Massingberd	1807?	1889	Retired as a Captain before later promotions
October 1884	Charles Luxmoore Hockin	1817	1902	Retired as a Captain before later promotions
October 1884	Thomas Etheridge			Retired as a Captain before later promotions
March 1885	Sir George Ommanney Willes KCB	1823	1901	Retired list from 1888
March 1885	Henry Gage Morris	1811		Retired as a Captain before later promotions; died before 1892
March 1885	George Henry Douglas	1821	1905	Retired as a Captain before later promotions; Rear Admiral of the White
March 1885	Henry Croft	1815?	1892	Retired as a Captain before later promotions
March 1885	Sir William Garnham Luard KCB	1820	1910	Retired list one week after promotion
March 1885	Augustus Henry Ingram		1888	Retired list since 1867 (then a Captain)
March 1885	William Ellis			Retired list since at least 1875
March 1885	Augustus Sinclair Booth			Retired list since at least 1875
March 1885	Wiliam Heriot Maitland-Dougall	1819	1890	Retired list since at least 1875
April 1885	Sir John Corbett KCB	1822	1893	Retired list from July 1887
April 1885	Arthur Trevor Macgregor	1799		Retired list since 1857 (then a Captain)
29 April 1885	Sir Algernon Frederick Rous de Horsey, KCB	1827	1922	Retired list 25 July 1892
April 1885	Edward Winterton Turnour	1821	1901	Retired list since 1880
June 1885	Henry Boys	1820	1904	Retired list one month after promotion
July 1885	Sir William Montagu Dowell, GCB	1825	1912	Retired list 2 August 1890
July 1885	Robert Jenkins CB			Retired list before promotion
July 1885	Frederick Augustus Maxse	1833	1900	Retired list before promotion
July 1885	David Robertson-Macdonald	1817	1910	Retired list before promotion
July 1885	William Norton Taylor	1798	1888	Retired list before promotion
July 1885	Jonas Archer Abbott			Retired list before promotion
July 1885	John Ross Ward			Retired list before promotion
July 1885	George Johnson	1809	1903	Retired list before promotion
July 1885	Robert Robertson	1813	1885	Retired list before promotion
July 1885	Jasper Henry Selwyn	1820	1901	Retired list before promotion
18 January 1886	Arthur William Acland Hood, 1st Baron Hood of Avalon, GCB	1824	1901	First Naval Lord 1885–1886 and 1886–1889; on retired list July 1889
April 1886	Sir John Edmund Commerell VC GCB	1829	1901	Promoted to Admiral of the Fleet 1892; on retired list from January 1899
April 1886	Victor Grant Hickley	1823?	1888	Retired as a Captain before later promotions
April 1886	Julian Foulston Slight CB		1890	Retired as a Captain 1866 before later promotions
April 1886	Thomas Saumarez CB	1827	1903	Retired as a Captain before later promotions
April 1886	Samuel Hoskins Derriman CB	1813	1897	Retired as a Captain 1866 before later promotions
April 1886	Charles Wake	1824	1890	Retired list since 1881
22 June 1886	Richard James Meade, 4th Earl of Clanwilliam, GCB, KCMG	1832	1907	Promoted to Admiral of the Fleet 1895
24 May 1887	Fitzgerald Algernon Charles Foley	1823	1903	Retired list since 1870 according to Dreadnought Project; in any event, retired on promotion
May 1887	Prince Victor of Hohenlohe-Langenburg GCB	1833	1891	Retired as a Captain 1866 before later promotions
May 1887	William Everard Alphonso Gordon	1817	1906	Retired as a Captain 1868 before later promotions
July 1887	Ernest Leopold Victor Charles Auguste Joseph Emich, Prince of Leiningen, GCB	1830	1904	Retired list 9 November 1895
July 1887	William Gore Jones CB	1826	1888	Retired list from October 1887 (The London Gazette 25749)
July 1887	John Orlebar	1810	1891	Retired list since 1864
July 1887	John William Dorville	1814	1894	Retired list since 1867
July 1887	William Cornish-Bowden	1826	1896	Promoted on retired list
July 1887	Henry Samuel Hawker	1816/7	1889	Retired list since 1868
July 1887	Francis Arden Close	1828	1918	Promoted on retired list
July 1887	William Wood	1824?	1889	Retired list since April 1870
October 1887	Sir Richard Vesey Hamilton, GCB	1829	1912	Retired list 28 May 1894
October 1887	Alfred, Duke of Saxe-Coburg and Gotha KG KT KP GCB GCSI GCMG GCIE GCVO	1843	1900	Promoted to Admiral of the Fleet 1893
October 1887	Henry John Blomfield	1827	1901	Retired list since April 1870
October 1887	John Francis Campbell Mackenzie	1821	1892	Retired list since 1866
October 1887	James Beautine Willoughby	1814	1888	Promoted on retired list
May 1888	Charles Ludovic Darley Waddilove	1828	1896	Retired list 13 May 1893
May 1888	John Rashleigh Rodd	1816		Retired as a Captain 1866 before later promotions
May 1888	Frederick Thomas Chetham Strode		1895	Retired as a Captain 1868 before later promotions
May 1888	John Wallace Douglas McDonald			Retired as a Captain 1865 before later promotions
June 1888	Leveson Eliot Henry Somerset	1829	1900	Retired list June 1891
June 1888	Richard Bulkeley Pearse	1830	1895	Retired as a Captain 1870 before later promotions
June 1888	Herbert Philip de Kantzow	1829	1915	Retired as a Captain 1870 before later promotions
15 December 1888	Sir Algernon McLennan Lyons, GCB	1833	1908	Promoted to Admiral of the Fleet 1897
December 1888	James Richard Veitch	1827	1909	Retired as a Captain before later promotions
July 1889	Sir Thomas Brandreth, KCB	1825	1894	Retired list 6 August 1890
July 1889	Frederick William Pleydell Bouverie	1816	1898	Retired as a Captain before later promotions
July 1889	Henry Christian	1828	1916	Retired as a Captain before later promotions
July 1889	Charles Wright Bonham	1817	1910	Retired as a Captain before later promotions
July 1889	John Halliday Cave CB	1827	1913	Retired as a Captain before later promotions
2 August 1890	Thomas Bridgeman Lethbridge	1828	1892	Retired list 5 August 1890, three days after promotion
5 August 1890	Sir Francis Sullivan, 6th Baronet, KCB, CMG	1834	1906	
6 August 1890	Edward Hardinge CB	1830	1894	Retired list since 1888
6 August 1890	Sir William Graham, GCB	1826	1907	Retired list 10 September 1891
20 June 1891	Sir Anthony Hiley Hoskins, GCB	1828	1901	First Naval Lord 1891–1893; Retired list 1 September 1893
10 September 1891	Sir Nowell Salmon, VC, GCB	1835	1912	C-in-C Portsmouth 1894–1897 promoted to Admiral of the Fleet 1899
14 February 1892	Sir John Kennedy Erskine Baird KCB	1832	1908	Retired list 16 September 1897
14 February 1892	Frederick William Gough, CB	1824	1908	Retired list since before promotion
14 February 1892	Mark Robert Pechell	1830	1902	Retired list since before promotion
25 February 1892	Sir George Willes Watson KCB	1827	1897	Retired list 5 April 1892
5 April 1892	William John Ward	1829	1900	Retired list 9 December 1894
5 April 1892	Henry Dennis Hickley	1826	1903	Retired list since December 1886
5 April 1892	Frederick Anstruther Herbert	1827	1911	Retired list since 1887
5 April 1892	Henry Bouchier Phillimore, CB	1833	1893	Retired list since before promotion
5 April 1892	Frederick Harrison Smith	1827	1897	Retired list since 1871
25 July 1892	William Henry Whyte	1829	1912	Retired list from August 1892
25 July 1892	Henry Rushworth Wratislaw CB	1832	1913	Retired list since 1891
August 1892	Henry Duncan Grant CB	1834	1896	
13 May 1893	Sir Michael Culme-Seymour, 3rd Baronet, GCB, GCVO	1836	1920	Retired list 13 March 1901
13 May 1893	John Moresby	1830	1922	Retired list since before promotion
13 May 1893	Sholto Douglas	1833	1913	Retired list since before promotion
13 May 1893	William Henry Edye	1830	1910	Retired list since 1890
1 September 1893	Sir Frederick William Richards, GCB	1833	1912	First Naval Lord 1893–1899 promoted to Admiral of the Fleet 1898
1 September 1893	Thomas Hutchinson Mangles Martin	1829	1895	Retired list since before promotion
1 September 1893	William FitzHerbert Ruxton	1830	1895	Retired list since before promotion
1 September 1893	Charles Bailey Calmady Dent	1832	1894	Retired list since before promotion
1 September 1893	George Teal Sebor Winthrop			Retired list since before promotion
28 May 1894	Walter Cecil Carpenter	1834	1904	Retired list from March 1896
28 May 1894	Ralph Peter Cator	1829	1903	Retired list since 1886
28 May 1894	William Henry Fenwick			Retired list since before promotion
9 December 1894	Sir Algernon Charles Fieschi Heneage GCB	1833	1915	Retired list 19 March 1898
9 December 1894	Armar Lowry-Corry	1836	1919	Retired list since before promotion
9 December 1894	Theodore Morton Jones	1832?	1895	Retired list since 1883
9 December 1894	Robert Gordon Douglas	1829	1910	Retired list since before promotion
9 December 1894	Alexander Philips			Retired list since before promotion
20 February 1895	Sir Walter James Hunt-Grubbe, GCB	1832	1922	Retired list 23 February 1897
9 November 1895	Charles John Rowley	1832	1919	
11 March 1896	Sir Richard Wells, KCB	1833	1896	C-in-C the Nore 1894–1896; died on active duty
10 October 1896	Sir Edmund Robert Fremantle GCB, GCVO, CMG	1836	1929	C-in-C Plymouth 1896–1899; retired list 15 June 1901
9 November 1896	Sir John Ommanney Hopkins, GCB	1834	1916	C-in-C Mediterranean Fleet 1896–1899; retired list 13 July 1899
9 November 1896	Thomas Le Hunte Ward, CB	1830	1907	Retired list since August 1890
November 1896	Frederick William Sidney			Retired list since before promotion
23 February 1897	Sir St. George Caulfield D'Arcy Irvine, KCB	1833	1916	Retired list 10 May 1897
10 May 1897	Sir Henry Fairfax, KCB	1837	1900	C-in-C Plymouth 1899–1900; died on active duty
23 August 1897	Sir James Elphinstone Erskine, KCB	1838	1911	Promoted to Admiral of the Fleet 1902
23 August 1897	Alfred John Chatfield CB	1831	1910	Retired list since 1891
23 August 1897	Thomas Barnardiston	1833	1907	Retired list since 1891
23 August 1897	Lindesay Brine	1834	1906	Retired list since 1894
16 September 1897	Sir Henry Frederick Nicholson, KCB	1835	1914	Retired list 11 December 1897
16 September 1897	Edward Field, CB	1828	1912	Retired list before promotion
16 September 1897	George Lydiard Sulivan	1832	1904	Retired list since 1892
11 December 1897	Sir Alexander Buller, GCB	1834	1903	Retired list 30 June 1899
26 December 1897	Loftus Francis Jones	1836	1912	Retired list 26 October 1899
19 March 1898	Edward Stanley Adeane, CMG	1836	1902	Retired list 7 December 1901
19 March 1898	George Stanley Bosanquet	1835	1914	Retired list since 1894
29 November 1898	Sir Richard Edward Tracey, KCB	1837	1907	Retired list 22 January 1902
13 January 1899	Sir Charles Frederick Hotham, GCB, GCVO	1843	1925	Promoted to Admiral of the Fleet in 1903; retired list from 1913
30 June 1899	Lord Charles Thomas Montagu Douglas Scott, GCB	1839	1911	C-in-C Plymouth 1900–1902; retired list 20 October 1904
13 July 1899	Sir Robert Henry More Molyneux GCB	1838	1904	Retired list 6 August 1903
26 October 1899	Sir Nathaniel Bowden-Smith, KCB	1838	1921	Retired list 21 January 1903
21 March 1900	Lord Walter Talbot Kerr, GCB	1839	1927	First Naval Lord 1899–1904; promoted to Admiral of the Fleet 1904
21 March 1900	James George Mead	1834	1913	Retired list since 1894
21 March 1900	William Henry Maxwell	1840	1920	Retired list since before promotion
13 March 1901	Sir George Digby Morant, KCB	1837	1921	Retired list 24 May 1901
24 May 1901	Sir Edward Hobart Seymour, GCB, OM, GCVO	1840	1929	Promoted to Admiral of the Fleet in 1905; retired list from 1910
15 June 1901	Henry Craven St. John	1837	1909	Retired list from 16 June 1901, one day after promotion
16 June 1901	Sir William Robert Kennedy, GCB	1838	1916	Retired list 2 November 1901
5 November 1901	John Fisher, 1st Baron Fisher, GCB, OM, GCVO	1841	1920	First Sea Lord 1904–1910 and 1914–1915; promoted to Admiral of the Fleet 1905
7 December 1901	Sir Henry Frederick Stephenson, GCVO, KCB	1842	1919	Retired list 1 September 1904
24 January 1902	Sir Charles George Fane, KCB	1837	1909	Retired list 25 January 1902
25 January 1902	Sir Compton Edward Domvile, GCB, GCVO	1842	1924	Retired list 10 October 1907
25 January 1902	John Frederick George Grant	1835	1916	Retired list since 1894
25 January 1902	Henry Forster Cleveland	1834	1924	Retired list since 1894
3 October 1902	Sir Frederick George Denham Bedford, GCB, GCVO	1838	1913	Retired list 30 May 1903
21 January 1903	Sir Albert Hastings Markham KCB	1841	1918	Retired list from 1906
21 January 1903	John Fiot Lee Pearse Maclear	1838	1907	Retired list since 1891
30 May 1903	Alfred Taylor Dale	1840	1925	Retired list 24 May 1905
6 August 1903	Claude Edward Buckle	1839	1930	Retired list 12 August 1903, six days after promotion
12 August 1903	Sir Harry Holdsworth Rawson GCB GCMG	1843	1910	Retired list 5 November 1908
30 August 1903	Sir Cyprian Arthur George Bridge, GCB	1839	1924	Retired list 15 March 1904
1 October 1903	Edmund Charles Drummond	1841	1911	Retired list 26 November 1904
15 March 1904	Sir Ernest Rice, KCB	1840	1927	Retired list 24 February 1905
15 March 1904	Charles Searle Cardale	1841	1904	Retired list since 1900
15 March 1904	Edmund John Church	1842	1904	Retired list since 1899
15 March 1904	Sir John Reginald Thomas Fullerton, GCVO, CB	1840	1918	Retired list since before promotion
15 March 1904	Charles Barstow Theobald	1843	1905	Retired list since 1893
15 March 1904	Henry St Leger Bury Palliser	1839	1907	Retired list since 1899
16 June 1904	Charles Lister Oxley	1841	1920	Retired list 17 October 1906
16 June 1904	Frederick Samuel Vander Meulen	1839	1913	Retired list since before promotion
16 June 1904	Sir Hilary Gustavus Andoe, KCB	1841	1905	Retired list since 1901
16 June 1904	Armand Temple Powlett	1841	1925	Retired list since 1901
16 June 1904	Alexander Plantagenet Hastings, CB	1843	1928	Retired list since before promotion
16 June 1904	Rodney Maclaine Lloyd, CB	1841	1911	Retired list since 1902
16 June 1904	Francis Starkey Clayton	1838	1913	Retired list since before promotion
16 June 1904	Arthur Hildebrand Alington	1839	1925	Retired list since 1899
16 June 1904	Henry John Carr	1839	1914	Retired list since 1899
1 September 1904	Sir Robert Hastings Penruddock Harris KCB KCMG	1843	1926	Retired list 12 October 1908
20 October 1904	Sir Hugo Lewis Pearson, KCB	1843	1912	Retired list 30 June 1908
26 November 1904	Sir John Fellowes KCB	1843	1913	Retired list 8 June 1905
16 February 1905	Charles Cooper Penrose-Fitzgerald	1841	1921	Retired list 2 March 1905
24 February 1905	Sir Arthur Knyvet Wilson, 3rd Baronet, VC, GCB, OM, GCVO	1842	1921	First Sea Lord 1910–1911; promoted to Admiral of the Fleet 1907; retired list from 1912
2 March 1905	Sir Archibald Lucius Douglas, GCB, GCVO	1842	1913	C-in-C Portsmouth 1902–1907; retired list 8 February 1907
24 May 1905	Sir Gerard Henry Uctred Noel GCB KCMG	1845	1918	Promoted to Admiral of the Fleet in 1908; retired list from 1915
24 May 1905	William Home Chisholm St Clair	1841	1905	Retired list since 1901
24 May 1905	Atwell Peregrine MacLeod Lake	1842	1915	Retired list since July 1902
8 June 1905	John William Brackenbury CB CMG	1842	1918	Retired list 5 July 1905
5 July 1905	Sir Thomas Sturges Jackson, KCVO	1842	1934	Retired list 22 July 1905, 17 days after promotion
22 July 1905	Sir Arthur Dalrymple Fanshawe, GCB, GCVO	1847	1936	Promoted to Admiral of the Fleet 1910; retired list from 1917
22 July 1905	Richard Horace Hamond	1843	1906	Retired list since before promotion
4 December 1905	Sir Day Hort Bosanquet, GCMG, GCVO, KCB	1843	1923	Retired list 22 March 1908
17 October 1906	Sir Lewis Anthony Beaumont, GCB, KCMG	1847	1922	C-in-C Plymouth 1902–1908; retired list 19 May 1912
11 November 1906	Charles William Beresford, 1st Baron Beresford, GCB, GCVO	1846	1919	C-in-C Channel Fleet 1903–1905 and 1907–1909; retired list 10 February 1911
1 January 1907	Albert Baldwin Jenkings	1846	1942	Retired list 1 June 1907
8 February 1907	Sir James Andrew Thomas Bruce, KCMG	1846	1921	Retired list 2 January 1909
8 February 1907	Sir Henry Coey Kane, KCB	1843	1917	Retired list since 1899
8 February 1907	Frederick Ross Boardman, CB	1843	1927	Retired list since 1899
1 March 1907	King George V	1865	1936	Promoted to Admiral of the Fleet on accession 1910
1 March 1907	Pelham Aldrich, CVO	1844	1930	Retired list 22 March 1908
1 March 1907	Henry Rose	1844	1928	Retired list since 1904
1 June 1907	Swinton Colthurst Holland	1844	1922	Retired list 11 April 1908
10 October 1907	Sir Arthur William Moore, GCB, GCVO, CMG	1847	1934	Retired list 30 July 1912
10 October 1907	Ernest Neville Rolfe, CB	1847	1909	Retired list since 1903
22 March 1908	Andrew Kennedy Bickford, CMG	1844	1927	Retired list 12 May 1908
22 March 1908	Sir William Alison Dyke Acland, 2nd Baronet CVO	1847	1924	Retired list 17 July 1911
14 April 1908	Sir Charles Carter Drury, GCB, GCVO, KCSI	1846	1914	C-in-C The Nore 1908–1911; retired list 27 August 1911
14 April 1908	William Frederick Stanley Mann	1846	1924	Retired list since before promotion
12 May 1908	Edmund Frederick Jeffreys, CVO	1846	1925	Retired list 18 May 1908, six days after promotion
18 May 1908	Sir Reginald Neville Custance, GCB, KCMG, CVO	1847	1935	Retired list 20 September 1912
30 June 1908	Sir William Hannam Henderson, KBE	1845	1931	Retired list 2 July 1908
30 June 1908	John Robert Ebenezer Pattisson	1844	1928	Retired list since November 1904
2 July 1908	Robert William Craigie	1849	1911	Retired list 5 November 1908
12 October 1908	Sir Wilmot Hawkesworth Fawkes, GCB, KCVO	1846	1926	Retired list 12 April 1911
5 November 1908	Sir George Lambart Atkinson-Willes, KCB	1847	1921	Retired list 13 July 1912
5 November 1908	Sir William Henry May, GCB, GCVO	1849	1930	C-in-C Home Fleet 1909–1911, C-in-C Plymouth 1911–13; promoted to Admiral of the Fleet 1913
5 November 1908	Edward Henry Meggs Davis	1846	1929	Retired list since 1905
5 November 1908	John Harvey Rainier	1847	1915	Retired list since 1905
2 December 1908	Sir Reginald Friend Hannam Henderson GCB	1846	1932	Retired list 1 January 1910
2 December 1908	Alfred Arthur Chase Parr	1849	1914	Retired list since 1906
2 January 1909	Count Frederick Cosmeto Metaxa	1847	1910	Retired list since 1905
2 January 1909	Sir Assheton Gore Curzon-Howe, GCVO, KCB, CMG	1850	1911	Died on active duty
1 January 1910	Angus MacLeod, CVO	1847	1920	Retired list 22 July 1910
30 April 1910	Sir Edmund Samuel Poe, GCVO, KCB	1848	1921	Retired list 11 September 1914
22 July 1910	Sir Charles Campbell, KCMG, CB, DSO	1847	1911	Retired list since 1906
22 July 1910	Sir John Durnford, GCB, DSO	1849	1914	Retired list 10 May 1913
10 February 1911	Charles James Barlow, DSO	1848	1921	Retired list 19 July 1911
10 February 1911	William Marrack	1847	1926	Retired list since 1906
10 February 1911	Gerald Charles Langley	1848	1914	Retired list since 1906
1 March 1911	Sir Hedworth Meux, GCB, KCVO	1856	1929	Promoted to Admiral of the Fleet 1915; retired list from July 1921
12 April 1911	Sir Francis Charles Bridgeman, GCB, GCVO	1848	1929	C-in-C Home Fleet 1911; First Sea Lord 1911–1912; retired list 7 December 1913
12 April 1911	Sir Francis Powell, KCMG, CB	1849	1927	Retired list since 1907
12 April 1911	Arthur Barrow	1853	1914	Retired list since 1906
17 July 1911	Sir Richard Poore, 4th Baronet, KCB, CVO	1853	1930	Retired list 3 April 1917
19 July 1911	George Augustus Giffard, CMG	1849	1925	Retired list 16 May 1913
19 July 1911	Robert Leonard Groome, CVO	1848	1917	Retired list since 1907
27 August 1911	Charles Grey Robinson, CVO	1850	1934	Retired list 18 September 1911
18 September 1911	Edward Harpur Gamble, CB	1849	1925	Retired list 18 September 1911
18 September 1911	Sir Archibald Berkeley Milne, 2nd Baronet, GCVO, KCB	1855	1938	C-in-C Mediterranean Fleet 1912–1914; retired list 12 February 1919
18 September 1911	Charles Ramsay Arbuthnot	1850	1913	Retired list since July 1907
18 September 1911	Walter Hodgson Bevan Graham	1849	1931	Retired list since January 1911
18 September 1911	Sir Randolph Frank Ollive Foote, KCB, CMG	1853	1931	Retired list since March 1911
19 May 1912	Sir George Fowler King-Hall KCB CVO	1850	1939	Retired list 10 February 1914
13 July 1912	Louis Alexander Mountbatten, 1st Marquess of Milford Haven, GCB, GCVO, KCMG	1854	1921	First Sea Lord 1912–1914; retired list 1 January 1919; promoted to Admiral of the Fleet in 1921
13 July 1912	Michael Pelham O'Callaghan, CB, CVO	1850	1937	Retired list since 1907
30 July 1912	Sir George Neville, KCB, CVO	1850	1923	Retired list 3 June 1913
30 July 1912	Gerald Walter Russell	1850	1928	Retired list since 1908
20 September 1912	Sir Alfred Leigh Winsloe, KCB, CMG, CVO	1852	1921	Retired list 13 December 1913
20 March 1913	Sir Percy Moreton Scott, 1st Baronet, KCB, KCVO	1853	1924	Retired list 21 March 1913, the following day
20 March 1913	Thomas MacGill, CB	1850	1926	Retired list since 1906
20 March 1913	Henry Seawell Frank Niblett, CVO	1852	1939	Retired list since 1910
20 March 1913	Frank Finnis, CVO	1851	1918	Retired list since 1909
20 March 1913	Arthur William Edward Prothero	1850	1931	Retired list since 1905
21 March 1913	Sir George Le Clerc Egerton, KCB	1852	1940	Retired list 9 June 1916
10 May 1913	Charles Henry Adair	1851	1920	Retired list 15 May 1913, five days after promotion
15 May 1913	Sir Frederic William Fisher, KCVO	1851	1943	Retired list 24 October 1914
15 May 1913	Alexander William Chisholm Batten, DSO, MVO	1851	1925	Retired list since 1907
16 May 1913	Charles Henry Cross	1852	1915	Retired list 17 May 1913, one day after promotion
17 May 1913	Sir George Astley Callaghan GCB GCVO	1852	1920	Acting Admiral from 1911; promoted to Admiral of the Fleet 1917
3 June 1913	Sir James Edward Clifford Goodrich	1851	1925	Retired list 4 June 1913, one day after promotion
3 June 1913	Charles Gauntlett Dicken	1854	1937	Retired list since 1908
3 June 1913	Archibald James Pocklington	1851	1922	Retired list since 1906
3 June 1913	George Morris Henderson, MVO	1851	1915	Retired list since 1908
3 June 1913	Francis George Kirby	1854	1951	Retired list since January 1908
4 June 1913	Sir Frederick Samuel Inglefield, KCB	1854	1921	Retired list 9 June 1916
4 June 1913	Charles Windham, CVO	1851	1916	Retired list since 1909
4 June 1913	Philip Francis Tillard	1852	1933	Retired list since 1909
4 June 1913	John Edward Bearcroft, CB, MVO	1851	1931	Retired list since 1906
4 June 1913	John Locke Marx, CB, MVO, DSO	1852	1939	Retired list since 1909
4 June 1913	Sir Arthur Mostyn Field, KCB	1855	1950	Retired list since August 1910
7 December 1913	John Denison, DSO	1853	1939	Retired list 7 December 1913
7 December 1913	Sir Alfred Wyndham Paget, KCB, KCMG, DSO	1852	1918	Retired list from September 1914
7 December 1913	Henry Morton Tudor Tudor	1855	1926	Retired list since 1909
13 December 1913	Sir Robert Swinburne Lowry, KCB	1854	1920	Retired list from 1917
10 February 1914	Sir Henry Bradwardine Jackson, GCB, KCVO	1855	1929	First Sea Lord 1915–1916; promoted to Admiral of the Fleet 1919
4 August 1914	John Rushworth Jellicoe, 1st Earl Jellicoe, GCB, OM, GCVO	1859	1935	C-in-C Grand Fleet 1914–1916; First Sea Lord 1916–1917; promoted to Admiral of the Fleet 1919; retired list 1924
September 1914	Sir Stanley Cecil James Colville, GCB, GCMG, GCVO	1861	1939	Retired list from April 1922
September 1914	Sir Arthur Murray Farquhar KCB CVO	1855	1937	Retired list 9 June 1916
October 1914	William Blake Fisher CB	1853	1926	Retired list since August 1914
October 1914	Ernest Alfred Simons	1856	1928	Retired list from October 1915
5 March 1915	Robert Stevenson Dalton Cuming, CBE, DSO	1852	1940	Retired list since 1907
October 1915	Sir Paul Warner Bush, KCB, MVO	1855	1930	Retired list from January 1916
24 October 1915	Sir James Startin KCB AM	1855	1948	Retired list since September 1914
October 1915	Harry Campbell Reynolds	1853	1949	Retired list since December 1908
10 January 1916	Sir Charles John Briggs, KCB	1858	1951	Retired list from July 1917
9 June 1916	Sir Frederick Tower Hamilton, GCVO, KCB	1856	1917	Second Sea Lord 1914–1916; died of heart attack on active duty; listed in 1918 Navy List as killed in action
9 June 1916	Sir Cecil Burney, 1st Baronet, GCB, GCMG	1858	1929	Admiral of the Fleet 1920; retired list November 1925
9 June 1916	Alban Giffard Tate	1853	1930	Retired list since 1912
9 June 1916	Thomas Young Greet	1854	1947	Retired list since 1908
9 June 1916	Arthur John Horsley	1853	1937	Retired list since 1907
9 June 1916	Herbert Augustus Warren, MVO	1855	1926	Retired list since 1911
9 June 1916	Frederick Sidney Pelham, CBE	1854	1931	Retired list 10 June 1916, one day after promotion
10 June 1916	Sir Alexander Edward Bethell, GCMG, KCB	1855	1931	C-in-C Plymouth 1916–1918; on retired list from September 1918
April 1917	Sir Frederic Edward Errington Brock, GBE, KCMG, CB	1854	1929	Retired list from August 1918
3 April 1917	Sir Charles Henry Coke, KCVO	1854	1945	Retired list 10 April 1917, seven days after promotion
3 April 1917	Hugh Pigot Williams	1858	1934	Retired list since 1915
3 April 1917	Sir Charles Edmund Kingsmill	1855	1935	Retired list since 1908
10 April 1917	Sir Thomas Henry Martyn Jerram, GCMG, KCB	1858	1933	Retired list in 1917
April 1917	Sir Douglas Austin Gamble, KCVO	1856	1934	Retired list May 1917
April 1917	Sir Colin Richard Keppel GCVO KCIE CB DSO	1862	1947	Retired list since December 1913
May 1917	Sir Frederick Charles Doveton Sturdee, 1st Baronet, GCB KCMG CVO	1859	1925	Promoted to Admiral of the Fleet 1921
July 1917	Sir Edward Eden Bradford GBE KCB CVO	1858	1935	Retired list from March 1918
July 1917	Sir Robert Nelson Ommanney KBE CB	1854	1938	Retired list since 1915
July 1917	Charles Hope Robertson CMG MVO	1856	1942	Retired list since 1909
July 1917	Henry Coare Kingsford	1858	1941	Retired list since 1912
August 1917	Sir Edmond John Warre Slade KCIE KCVO	1859	1928	Retired list from September 1917, 13 days after promotion
September 1917	Sir Sackville Hamilton Carden, KCMG	1857	1930	Retired list from October 1917
October 1917	Richard Bowles Farquhar, CB	1859	1948	Retired list from January 1918
October 1917	Sir Lewis Bayly, KCB, KCMG, CVO	1857	1938	Retired list from 1919
January 1918	Sir George Edwin Patey, KCMG, KCVO	1859	1935	Retired list from start of 1919
January 1918	Sir Arthur Henry Limpus KCMG CB	1863	1931	Retired list 1 January 1919
11 March 1918	Sir Richard Henry Peirse, KCB, KBE, MVO	1860	1940	Retired list 17 January 1919
August 1918	Sir Herbert Goodenough King-Hall KCB CVO DSO	1862	1936	Retired list from May 1922
September 1918	Arthur Yerbury Moggridge	1858	1946	Retired list since July 1915
September 1918	Sir William Lowther Grant KCB	1864	1929	Retired list 24 March 1920
September 1918	Sir Reginald Hugh Spencer Bacon KCB KCVO DSO	1863	1947	Retired list since 1909 but recalled to active duty 1914–1919
September 1918	Robert Hathorn Johnston Stewart CB MVO	1858	1940	Retired list since 1912
1 January 1919	David Richard Beatty, 1st Earl Beatty, GCB, OM, GCVO, DSO	1871	1936	C-in-C Grand Fleet 1916–1919; First Sea Lord 1919–1927; promoted to Admiral of the Fleet May 1919; retired list 1927
January 1919	Henry Loftus Tottenham, CB	1860	1950	Retired list since October 1918
1 January 1919	Sir Reginald Godfrey Otway Tupper, GBE, KCB, CVO	1859	1945	Retired list 16 May 1921
1 January 1919	Spencer Victor Yorke de Horsey	1863	1937	Retired list since before promotion
1 January 1919	Robert Grant Fraser	1858	1920	Retired list since 1910
1 January 1919	Sir Herbert Edward Purey-Cust, KBE, CB	1857	1938	Retired list since 1912
1 January 1919	Herbert Lyon, CB	1856	1919	Retired list since 1913
1 January 1919	Charles Henry Hodgson Moore	1858	1920	Retired list since 1913
January 1919	Lionel Grant Tufnell CMG	1857	1930	Retired list since 1911
1 January 1919	Sir William Fane de Salis, KBE, MVO	1858	1939	Retired list since 1913
1 January 1919	Sir Charles Hope Dundas, KCMG	1859	1924	Retired list since 1916
January 1919	Bernard Currey	1862	1936	Retired list eight days after promotion
January 1919	Sir Ernest Charles Thomas Troubridge, KCMG, CB, MVO	1862	1926	Retired list
17 January 1919	Sir Archibald Gordon Henry Wilson Moore, KCB, CVO	1862	1934	Retired list 21 February 1919
17 January 1919	Arthur Wartensleben Ewart	1862	1922	Retired list since 1911
12 February 1919	Sir Charles Madden, 1st Baronet	1862	1935	First Sea Lord 1927–1930; promoted to Admiral of the Fleet 1924; retired list 1930
21 February 1919	Rosslyn Erskine Wemyss, 1st Baron Wester Wemyss, GCB, CMG, MVO	1864	1933	First Sea Lord 1917–1919; promoted to Admiral of the Fleet 1919; retired list 1929
April 1919	Charles Eustace Anson CB MVO	1859	1940	Retired list since April 1917
April 1919	Sir Cecil Fiennes Thursby, KCB, KCMG	1861	1936	Retired list 7 October 1920
July 1919	Arthur Henry Christian, CB, MVO	1863	1926	Retired list 3 October 1919
July 1919	Sir Somerset Arthur Gough-Calthorpe GCB GCMG CVO	1864	1937	Promoted to Admiral of the Fleet 1925; retired list from 1930
3 October 1919	Sir Herbert Leopold Heath, KCB, MVO	1861	1954	Second Sea Lord 1917–1919; retired list from June 1922
3 October 1919	William Oswald Story, CBE	1859	1938	Retired list since 1912
November 1919	Sir Montague Edward Browning GCB GCMG GCVO	1863	1947	Retired list from October 1926
24 March 1920	Sir John Michael de Robeck, 1st Baronet, GCB GCMG GCVO	1862	1928	Promoted to Admiral of the Fleet in 1925
7 October 1920	Sir Hugh Evan-Thomas, GCB, KCMG, MVO	1862	1928	Retired list 30 June 1924
7 October 1920	Richard Purefoy FitzGerald Purefoy, CBE, MVO	1862	1943	Retired list since 1916
7 October 1920	Arthur William Waymouth, CB	1863	1936	Retired list since 1917
7 October 1920	Godfrey Harry Brydges Mundy, CB, DSO, MVO	1860	1928	Retired list since 1917
7 October 1920	Archibald Peile Stoddart, CB	1860	1939	Retired list since 1918
November 1920	Stuart Nicholson CB MVO	1865	1936	Retired list one day after promotion
November 1920	Sir Dudley Rawson Stratford de Chair KCB KCMG MVO	1864	1958	Retired list from November 1923
16 May 1921	Sir Frederick Charles Tudor Tudor, KCB, KCMG	1863	1946	Retired list November 1922
16 May 1921	Sir Henry Hervey Campbell, KCVO, CB	1865	1933	Retired list since 1917
16 May 1921	Evelyn Robert Le Marchant, DSO	1858	1949	Retired list since 1913
July 1921	Sir Alexander Ludovic Duff GCB GBE KCVO	1862	1933	Retired list July 1925
5 July 1921	Sir Edward Francis Benedict Charlton, KCB, KCMG	1865	1937	Retired list from March 1924
5 July 1921	Reginald Arthur Allenby, DSO, MVO	1861	1936	Retired list since 1915
5 July 1921	Seymour Elphinstone Erskine, CB	1863	1945	Retired list since 1915
5 July 1921	John de Mestre Hutchison, CMG, CVO	1862	1932	Retired list since 1916
April 1922	Robert Stewart Phipps Hornby CMG	1866	1956	Retired list 6 April 1922, two days after promotion
6 April 1922	Sir William Christopher Pakenham, GCB, KCMG, KCVO	1861	1933	Retired list 1 March 1926
6 April 1922	Mark Edward Frederic Kerr, CB, CVO	1864	1944	Retired list since 1918
6 April 1922	John Bridges Eustace	1861	1947	Retired list since 1918
June 1922	Cresswell John Eyres DSO OBE	1862	1949	Retired list since December 1914
June 1922	Francis Spurstow Miller CB	1863	1954	Retired list since January 1920
June 1922	Francis George Eyre	1864	1941	Retired list since February 1919
June 1922	Sir Arthur Cavenagh Leveson GCB	1868	1929	Retired list from February 1928
November 1922	Sir Sydney Robert Fremantle, GCB, MVO	1867	1958	Retired list 5 April 1928
November 1923	Sir Henry Francis Oliver GCB KCMG MVO	1865	1965	Promoted to Admiral of the Fleet 1928; retired list 1933–1940
March 1924	George Alexander Ballard CB	1862	1948	Retired list since June 1921
March 1924	Sir Morgan Singer KCB KCVO	1864	1938	Retired list 1 August 1924
March 1924	Sir Edmund Radcliffe Pears KBE CB	1862	1941	Retired list since January 1920
March 1924	Arthur David Ricardo CB	1861	1931	Retired list since 1920
30 July 1924	Sir Ernest Frederick Augustus Gaunt, KCB, KBE, CMG	1865	1940	Retired list from March 1925
July 1924	Cecil Frederick Dampier CMG	1868	1950	Retired list since July 1922
31 July 1924	Sir Osmond de Beauvoir Brock, GCB, KCMG, KCVO	1869	1947	Promoted to Admiral of the Fleet 1929
31 July 1924	Sir Robert John Prendergast, KCB	1864	1946	Retired list since 1919
31 July 1924	Norman Craig Palmer, CVO	1866	1926	Retired list since 1919
31 July 1924	Cecil Frederick Dampier, CMG	1868	1950	Retired list since 1922
1 August 1924	Sir Richard Fortescue Phillimore, GCB, KCMG, MVO	1864	1940	Retired list from October 1929
1 August 1924	Hubert Grant-Dalton, CB	1862	1934	Retired list since 1915
1 August 1924	Alfred Ernest Albert Grant	1861	1933	Retired list since 1919
1 August 1924	Cyril Everard Tower, DSO	1861	1929	Retired list since 1915
1 August 1924	Joseph Ridgway Bridson	1861	1933	Retired list since 1919
1 August 1924	Edmund Hyde Smith, CB	1865	1939	Retired list since 1919
1 August 1924	Ernest Gillbe Barton	1861	1938	Retired list since 1915
1 August 1924	Robert Hamilton Anstruther, CMG	1862	1938	Retired list since 1915
1 August 1924	Bentinck John Davies Yelverton, CB	1862	1959	Retired list since 1915
1 August 1924	Henry James Langford Clarke, CBE	1866	1944	Retired list since 1915
1 August 1924	Arthur Hayes-Sadler, CSI	1865	1952	Retired list since 1920
March 1925	Sir Charles Lionel Vaughan-Lee KBE CB	1867	1928	Retired list since 1920
March 1925	Sir Douglas Romilly Lothian Nicholson KCMG KCVO	1867	1946	Retired list 1 March 1926
March 1925	Edward Stafford Fitzherbert, 13th Baron Stafford, KCB	1865	1941	Retired list since March 1923
8 May 1925	Sir William Edmund Goodenough GCB MVO	1867	1945	Retired list from 1930
8 May 1925	Cecil Spencer Hickley, CB, MVO	1865	1941	Retired list since 1920
8 May 1925	Sir Arthur John Henniker-Hughan, 6th Baronet, CB	1866	1925	Retired list since 1920
8 May 1925	Sir Thomas Dawson Lees Sheppard, KBE, CB, MVO	1866	1953	Retired list since 1922
8 May 1925	Francis William Kennedy, CB	1862	1939	Retired list since 1920
8 May 1925	Rowland Nugent	1861	1948	Retired list since 1916
8 May 1925	Hugh Thomas Hibbert, CBE, DSO	1863	1951	Retired list since 1916
8 May 1925	Herbert Arthur Stevenson Fyler, CB, DSO	1864	1934	Retired list since 1916
8 May 1925	Sir Heathcoat Salusbury Grant, KCMG, CB	1864	1938	Retired list since 1920
8 May 1925	Sir Thomas Jackson, KBE, CB, MVO	1868	1945	Retired list since 1923
8 May 1925	Frank Edward Cavendish Ryan, CBE	1865	1945	Retired list since 1916
8 May 1925	Philip Nelson-Ward, CVO	1866	1937	Retired list since 1916
July 1925	Sir William Coldingham Masters Nicholson KCB	1863	1932	Retired list from October 1925
24 November 1925	Sir George Price Webley Hope KCB KCMG	1869	1959	Retired list 2 March 1926
24 November 1925	John Scott Luard CB	1865	1936	Retired list since 1917
24 November 1925	Herbert Charles Campbell Da Costa	1865	1940	Retired list since 1920
24 November 1925	Cuthbert Edward Hunter	1866	1952	Retired list since 1917
24 November 1925	Sir Laurence Eliot Power, KCB, CVO	1864	1927	Retired list since 1920
24 November 1925	Sir John Franklin Parry, KCB	1863	1926	Retired list since 1920
1 March 1926	Roger John Brownlow Keyes, 1st Baron Keyes, GCB, KCVO, CMG, DSO	1872	1945	C-in-C Mediterranean Fleet 1925–1929; C-in-C Portsmouth 1929–1931; promoted to Admiral of the Fleet 1930
1 March 1926	Cecil Foley Lambert KCB	1864	1928	Retired list
1 March 1926	Sir Hugh Henry Darby Tothill, KCB, KCMG, KCVO	1865	1927	Retired list from October 1926
2 March 1926	Sir Victor Albert Stanley, KCB, MVO	1867	1934	Retired list from November 1926
October 1926	Sir Lionel Halsey GCMG GCVO KCIE CB	1872	1949	Retired list since November 1922
October 1926	Sir Edwyn Sinclair Alexander-Sinclair GCB MVO	1865	1945	Retired list from 1930
October 1926	Stuart St. John Farquhar	1865	1941	Retired list since 1917
October 1926	Sir James Andrew Fergusson, KCB, KCMG	1871	1942	
8 November 1926	Sir Lewis Clinton-Baker KCB KCVO CBE	1866	1939	Retired list from August 1927
November 1926	Thomas Webster Kemp CB CMG CIE	1866	1928	Retired list since 1917
November 1926	Bertram Mordaunt Chambers CB	1866	1945	Retired list since 1917
November 1926	Sir William Reginald Hall KCMG CB	1870	1943	Retired list since 1919
November 1926	Sir Henry Harvey Bruce KCB MVO	1862	1948	Retired list since 1922
November 1926	Clement Greatorex CB MVO	1869	1937	Retired list since 1922
November 1926	George Cuthbert Cayley CB	1866	1944	Retired list since 1919
November 1926	Sir Allan Frederic Everett KCMG KCVO CB	1868	1938	Retired list since 1925
November 1926	Sir Henry Bertram Pelly KCVO CB	1867	1942	Retired list since 1925
November 1926	John Nicholas	1865	1942	Retired list since 1917
November 1926	Sir Allen Thomas Hunt KCB CSI	1866	1943	Retired list since 1924
1 August 1927	Sir Walter Henry Cowan Bt, KCB DSO MVO ADC	1871	1956	Retired list October 1931
1 August 1927	Brian Herbert Fairbairn Barttelot, KBE CB CVO	1867	1942	Retired list since 1923
1 August 1927	Sir John Frederick Ernest Green, KCMG CB	1866	1948	Retired list since January 1925
1 August 1927	Richard Morden Harbord-Hamond, 10th Baron Suffield	1865	1951	Retired list
1 August 1927	Vivian Henry Gerald Bernard, CB	1868	1934	Retired list
1 August 1927	Charles Frederick Thorp CBE	1869	1954	Retired list
1 August 1927	Edward Francis Bruen, CB	1866	1952	Retired list
1 August 1927	James Clement Ley, CB CVO	1869	1946	Retired list since 1923
1 August 1927	Edmond Hyde Parker CB	1868	1951	Retired list
1 August 1927	William George Elmhirst Ruck-Keene, MVO	1867	1935	Retired list
1 August 1927	Edward Montgomery Phillpotts, CB	1871	1952	Retired list
1 August 1927	Cunningham Robert de Clare Foot, CBE	1864	1940	Retired list
1 August 1927	Algernon Walker-Heneage-Vivian, CB MVO	1871	1952	Retired list
1 August 1927	Sir Frederick Charles Learmonth, KBE, CB	1866	1941	Retired list
1 August 1927	Philip Howard Colomb, CB	1867	1958	Retired list since 1923
1 August 1927	George Holmes Borrett, CB	1868	1952	Retired list
1 August 1927	Charles Ferdinand Henderson	1866	1935	Retired list
21 January 1928	Sir Richard Webb KCMG CB	1870	1950	Retired list 27 February 1929
21 January 1928	Philip Wylie Dumas, CB, CVO	1868	1948	Retired list since 1918
22 February 1928	Sir Rudolph Walter Bentinck, KCB KCMG	1869	1947	Retired list from October 1929
February 1928	Charles Frederick Corbett CB MVO	1867	1955	Retired list since 1922
February 1928	Sir Guy Reginald Archer Gaunt, KCMG, CB	1869	1953	Retired list
5 April 1928	Sir Frederick Laurence Field, GCB, KCMG	1871	1945	C-in-C Mediterranean Fleet 1928–1930; First Sea Lord 1930–1933; promoted to Admiral of the Fleet in 1933
5 April 1928	Sir Algernon Douglas Edward Harry Boyle, KCB, CMG, MVO	1871	1949	Retired list since 1924
5 April 1928	Sir Edmund Percy Fenwick George Grant, KCVO, CB	1867	1952	Retired list since 14 January 1928
5 April 1928	Edwin Veale Underhill, CB	1868	1928	Retired list since before promotion
5 April 1928	Henry Lancelot Mawbey, CB, CVO	1870	1933	Retired list since 1924
11 June 1928	Sir Hubert George Brand, GCB KCMG KCVO	1870	1955	Retired list October 1932
27 February 1929	Sir Reginald Tyrwhitt, GCB, DSO	1870	1951	Promoted to Admiral of the Fleet 1934
27 February 1929	Henry Blackett, CBE	1867	1952	Retired list since 1919
27 February 1929	Henry William Grant, CB	1870	1949	Retired list since 1919
27 February 1929	Sir Charles Martin de Bartolomé, KCMG, CB	1871	1941	Retired list since 1919
27 February 1929	Sydney Stewart Hall, CB	1872	1955	Retired list since 1919
27 February 1929	Douglas Lionel Dent, CB, CMG	1869	1959	Retired list since 1926
31 July 1929	Sir Michael Henry Hodges KCB CMG MVO	1874	1951	Second Sea Lord 1927–1930; retired list from 1932
October 1929	Sir Hugh Dudley Richards Watson, KCB, CVO, CBE	1872	1954	Retired list from April 1930
1 April 1930	Alfred Ernle Montacute Chatfield, 1st Baron Chatfield GCB OM	1873	1967	First Sea Lord 1933–1938; promoted to Admiral of the Fleet 1935
1 April 1930	Crawford Maclachlan CB	1867	1952	Retired list
1 April 1930	John Luce CB	1870	1932	Retired list
1 April 1930	Wilmot Stuart Nicholson, CB	1872	1947	Retired list since 1927
8 May 1930	Sir Arthur Allan Morison Duff, KCB	1874	1952	Retired list 15 May 1930
8 May 1930	Charles Duncan Johnson, CB, DSO, MVO	1869	1930	Retired list since 1926
15 May 1930	Sir Cyril Thomas Moulden Fuller, KCB, CMG, DSO	1874	1942	Second Sea Lord 1930–1932; retired in 1935
15 May 1930	Sir Hugh Francis Paget Sinclair, KCB	1873	1939	Director of British Naval Intelligence 1919; retired list since 1926
15 May 1930	Sir Aubrey Clare Hugh Smith, KCVO, KBE, CB	1872	1957	Retired list since 1926
15 May 1930	Hugh Lindsay Patrick Heard, CB, DSO	1869	1934	Retired list since 1926
12 December 1930	Sir John Donald Kelly, GCB GCVO	1871	1936	Promoted to Admiral of the Fleet 1936
1 April 1931	Sir Henry Tritton Buller, GCVO KCB	1873	1960	
6 October 1931	Thomas Drummond Gilbert, CB	1870	1962	Retired list
6 October 1931	William Archibald Howard Kelly, GBE, KCB, CMG, MVO	1873	1952	Retired list June 1936
September 1932	Bertram Sackville Thesiger, KBE CB CMG	1875	1966	Retired list 31 December 1932
12 October 1932	Vernon Harry Stuart Haggard, KCB CMG	1874	1960	Retired list 13 October 1932
13 October 1932	Percival Henry Hall-Thompson CB CMG	1874	1950	Retired 1932
12 October 1932	Robert Nesham Bax, CB	1875	1969	Retired list from 1928 to 1940 and after 1945
13 October 1932	Charles Pipon Beaty-Pownall, CMG	1872	1938	Retired list
13 October 1932	Richard Greville Arthur Wellington Stapleton-Cotton, CB CBE MVO	1873	1953	Retired list
1 November 1932	William Henry Dudley Boyle, 12th Earl of Cork and Orrery, GCB GCVO	1873	1967	Promoted to Admiral of the Fleet 1938
31 December 1932	Sir Albert Percy Addison, KBE CB CMG	1875	1952	Retired list since 1929
31 December 1932	Sir Frederic Charles Dreyer, GBE KCB	1878	1956	Retired list in 1939
31 December 1932	Sir Alan Geoffrey Hotham, KCMG CB	1876	1965	Retired list since 1929
21 January 1933	Sir Francis Herbert Mitchell, CB, DSO	1876	1946	Retired list 1 September 1933
1 September 1933	Sir Frank Larken, KCB, CMG	1875	1953	Retired list 20 September 1933
1 September 1933	John Ewen Cameron, CB MVO	1874	1939	Retired list since 1929
1 September 1933	Cyril Samuel Townsend, CB	1875	1949	Retired list since 1929
1 September 1933	Cecil Minet Staveley, CB, CMG	1874	1934	Retired List since 1929
30 September 1933	Sir Rudolf Miles Burmester, KBE, CB, CMG	1875	1956	
30 September 1933	William Rawdon Napier, CB, CMG, DSO	1877	1951	Retired list since 1929
30 September 1933	Humphrey Wykeham Bowring, CB, DSO	1874	1952	Retired list since 1929
10 October 1933	David Thomas Norris, CB CMG	1875	1937	Retired list since 1929
11 February 1934	Sir Roger Roland Charles Backhouse GCB GCVO CMG	1878	1939	First Sea Lord 1938–1939; promoted to Admiral of the Fleet 1939
28 February 1934	Sir Lionel George Preston KCB	1875	1971	Retired list from 1935
31 July 1934	Sir Herbert Meade-Fetherstonhaugh, GCVO CB DSO	1875	1964	Retired list July 1936
January 1935	King Edward VIII	1894	1972	Promoted to Admiral of the Fleet on accession 1936
January 1935	Sir Alfred Dudley Pickman Rogers Pound, GCB, OM, GCVO	1877	1943	First Sea Lord 1939–1943; promoted to Admiral of the Fleet 1939
8 May 1935	Sir Hugh Justin Tweedie, KCB	1877	1951	Retired list 1 January 1936
8 May 1935	Leonard Andrew Boyd Donaldson, CB, CMG	1875	1956	Retired list since before promotion
1935	Sir Eric John Arthur Fullerton, KCB, DSO	1878	1962	Retired list 1 January 1936
1 January 1936	Sir William Munro Kerr, KBE, CB	1876	1959	Retired list 2 January 1936, one day after promotion
1 January 1936	Sir Barry Edward Domvile, KBE, CB, CMG	1878	1971	Retired list 2 January 1936, one day after promotion
1 January 1936	Herbert Willes Webley Hope, CB, CVO, DSO	1878	1968	Retired list since 1931
1 January 1936	Anselan John Buchanan Stirling, CB	1875	1936	Retired list since 1931
1 January 1936	John Moore Casement, CB	1877	1952	Retired list since 1931
1 January 1936	Sir Arthur John Davies, KBE, CB	1877	1954	Retired list since before promotion
2 January 1936	Sir Reginald Aylmer Plunkett-Ernle-Erle-Drax, KCB, DSO	1880	1967	C-in-C Plymouth 1935–1938; C-in-C the Nore 1939–1941
2 January 1936	Sir Martin Eric Dunbar-Nasmith, VC, KCB, KCMG	1883	1965	C-in-C Plymouth 1938–1941
January 1936	King George VI	1895	1952	Promoted to Admiral of the Fleet on accession December 1936
12 July 1936	Edward Ratcliffe Garth Russell Evans, 1st Baron Mountevans, KCB, DSO	1880	1957	
19 June 1936	Matthew Robert Best, KCB DSO MVO	1879	1940	C-in-C, America and West Indies Station 1934. Retired Jan 1936
19 July 1936	Sir George Knightley Chetwode, KCB CBE	1877	1957	Retired list from August 1936
19 August 1936	Sir Charles Morton Forbes, GCB DSOCinC Home Fleet 1938–1940, CinC Plymouth 1941–1943	1880	1960	Promoted to Admiral of the Fleet 1940
June 1937	Sir Charles James Colebrooke Little GCB GBE	1882	1973	Retired list from April 1945
January 1938	Sir William Milbourne James GCB	1881	1973	
15 May 1939	Sir Henry John Studholme Brownrigg KBE CB DSO	1882	1943	
May 1939	Sir Ragnar Musgrave Colvin, KBE, CB	1882	1954	
May 1939	Sir Percy Lockhart Harnam Noble GBE KCB CVO	1880	1955	
June 1939	Sir Francis William Loftus Tottenham KCB CBE	1880	1967	
July 1939	Sir Sidney Robert Bailey, KBE, CB, DSO	1882	1942	
December 1939	Sir Alexander Robert Maule Ramsay GCVO KCB DSO	1881	1972	
January 1940	Sir Sidney Julius Meyrick KCB	1879	1973	Retired list from 1941
8 May 1940	Sir Dudley Burton Napier North, GCVO, CB, CSI, CMG	1881	1961	
1 August 1940	Noel Frank Laurence, KCB DSO	1882	1970	
3 January 1941	Andrew Browne Cunningham, 1st Viscount Cunningham of Hyndhope, KT, GCB, OM, DSO	1883	1963	First Sea Lord 1943–1946; promoted to Admiral of the Fleet January 1943
January 1941	Sir Max Kennedy Horton GCB DSO	1883	1951	
January 1941	Sir Wilbraham Tennyson Randle Ford KCB KBE	1880	1964	
October 1941	Sir Tom Spencer Vaughan Phillips KCB	1888	1941	his full Admiral rank promotion announced on 1 December 1941; C-in-C Eastern Fleet October 1941 – 10 December 1941; killed in action when Prince of Wales and Repulse were sunk by Japanese air attack on 10 December 1941
February 1942	Sir Charles Edward Kennedy-Purvis GBE KCB	1884	1946	
April 1942	Sir Charles Gordon Ramsey KCB	1882	1966	retired 1942
April 1942	Sir Thomas Hugh Binney KCB KCMG DSO	1883	1953	retired 1945
April 1942	Sir James Fownes Somerville GCB GBE DSO	1882	1949	Promoted to Admiral of the Fleet May 1945
June 1942	Sir George Hamilton D'Oyly Lyon GCB	1883	1947	
September 1942	Sir Geoffrey Layton GBE KCB KCMG DSO	1884	1964	
October 1942	Sir Guy Charles Cecil Royle KCB CMG	1885	1954	
October 1942	John Cronyn Tovey, 1st Baron Tovey GCB, KBE, DSO	1885	1971	Promoted to Admiral of the Fleet October 1943
January 1943	Sir George Frederick Basset Edward-Collins KCB KCVO	1883	1958	
4 August 1943	Sir John Henry Dacres Cunningham, GCB, MVO	1885	1962	C-in-C Mediterranean Fleet 1943–1946; First Sea Lord 1946–1948; promoted to Admiral of the Fleet 1948
December 1943	Sir Ralph Leatham KCB	1886	1954	
December 1943	Sir William Jock Whitworth KCB DSO	1884	1973	
7 February 1944	Bruce Fraser, 1st Baron Fraser of North Cape GCB, KBE	1888	1981	First Sea Lord 1948–1951; promoted to Admiral of the Fleet 1948
April 1944	Sir Bertram Home Ramsay KCB KBE MVO	1883	1945	killed in air accident on active duty
June 1944	Sir Henry Daniel Pridham-Wippell KCB CVO	1885	1952	Retired list 14 February 1948
April 1945	Sir Henry Ruthven Moore, GCB, CVO, DSO	1886	1978	C-in-C The Nore 1948–1950; retired list 15 January 1951
May 1945	Sir William Frederic Wake-Walker KCB CBE	1888	1945	Died on active duty months after promotion
September 1945	John Henry Godfrey CB	1888	1970	Retired list from date of promotion
September 1945	Sir Harold Martin Burrough GCB KBE DSO	1889	1977	retired 1949
October 1945	Sir Henry Harwood Harwood KCB OBE	1888	1950	Retired list since August 1945
October 1945	Sir Marshal Llewelyn Clarke KBE CB DSC	1887	1959	Retired list upon promotion
October 1945	Sir Algernon Usborne Willis GCB DSO	1889	1976	Promoted to Admiral of the Fleet 1949
1946	Sir Edward Neville Syfret GCB KBE	1889	1972	retired 1948
6 May 1946	Sir Arthur John Power, GCB, GBE, CVO	1889	1960	C-in-C Mediterranean Fleet 1948–1950; C-in-C Portsmouth 1950–1952; promoted to Admiral of the Fleet April 1952
1946	Sir Arthur Malcolm Peters KCB DSC	1888	1979	retired list since 1945
16 May 1947	Sir Arthur Francis Eric Palliser, KCB, DSC	1890	1956	Retired list 2 September 1948
16 May 1947	Sir Louis Henry Keppel Hamilton, KCB, DSO	1890	1957	Retired list 26 September 1948
16 May 1947	Sir Irvine Gordon Glennie, KCB	1892	1980	Retired list since earlier that year
4 January 1948	Sir Geoffrey John Audley Miles KCB KCSI	1890	1986	Retired list from April 1948
4 January 1948	Sir Frederick Hew George Dalrymple-Hamilton KCB	1890	1974	
21 January 1948	Sir Denis William Boyd, KCB, CBE, DSC	1891	1965	Retired list 22 June 1949
2 September 1948	Sir Rhoderick Robert McGrigor GCB	1893	1959	First Sea Lord 1951–1955; Admiral of the Fleet 1953
September 1948	Sir Harold Thomas Coulthard Walker KCB	1891	1975	Retired list since September 1947
26 September 1948	Sir Philip Louis Vian GCB KBE DSO	1894	1968	Promoted to Admiral of the Fleet 1952
22 October 1948	Sir William Tennant KCB CBE MVO	1890	1963	
22 October 1948	Sir Charles Eric Morgan KCB DSO	1889	1951	Retired list
3 February 1949	Sir Victor Alexander Charles Crutchley VC KCB DSC	1893	1986	Retired list since 1947
22 June 1949	Sir Cecil Halliday Jepson Harcourt, GBE, KCB	1892	1959	Retired list 27 January 1953
22 June 1949	Sir Douglas Blake Fisher, KCB, KBE	1890	1963	Retired list since 1948
3 August 1949	Sir Wilfrid Rupert Patterson, KCB, CBE, CVO	1893	1954	Retired list 1 December 1950
4 October 1950	Sir Reginald Henry Portal KCB DSC	1894	1983	Retired list from May 1951
1 December 1950	Sir Harold Richard George Kinahan, KBE, CB	1893	1980	Retired list 15 May 1952
1 December 1950	Sir Ernest Russell Archer, KCB, CBE	1891	1958	Retired list 1 December 1950
	Sir Herbert Annesley Packer, KCB, CBE	1894	1962	Retired list 18 March 1953
15 January 1951	Sir George Elvey Creasy, GCB, CBE, DSO, MVO	1895	1972	Promoted to Admiral of the Fleet 1955
15 January 1951	Sir Randolph Stewart Gresham Nicholson, KBE, CB, DSO, DSC	1892	1975	Retired list since 1950
1 May 1951	Sir William Edward Parry, KCB	1893	1972	Retired in January 1952
26 January 1952	Sir Charles Henry Lawrence Woodhouse, KCB	1893	1978	Retired list since 1950
15 March 1952	Angus Cunninghame Graham	1893	1981	
10 April 1952	Sir Guy Herbrand Edward Russell, GBE, KCB, DSO	1898	1977	C-in-C Far East Fleet 1952–1953; Second Sea Lord 1953–1955; retired list 7 January 1958
10 April 1952	Sir Arthur Robin Moore Bridge, KBE, CB	1894	1971	Retired list since 1951
22 April 1952	Sir Michael Maynard Denny, GCB, CBE, DSO	1896	1972	C-in-C Home Fleet 1954–1955; retired list 28 July 1959
15 May 1952	Sir Geoffrey Nigel Oliver, GBE, KCB, DSO	1898	1980	C-in-C East Indies 1950–1952; C-in-C The Nore 1953–1955; retired list 1 December 1955
1952?	Sir Alexander Cumming Gordon Madden, KCB, CBE	1895	1964	Second Sea Lord 1950–1953; C-in-C Plymouth 1953–1955; retired list 29 February 1956
27 January 1953	Louis Mountbatten, 1st Earl Mountbatten of Burma, KG, GCB, OM, GCSI, GCIE, GCVO, DSO	1900	1979	First Sea Lord 1955–1959; Chief of Defence Staff 1959–1965; promoted to Admiral of the Fleet 1956
27 January 1953	Sir Richard Victor Symonds-Tayler, KBE, CB, DSC	1897	1971	Retired list since before promotion
18 March 1953	Sir Maurice James Mansergh, KCB, CBE	1896	1966	Retired list 30 March 1954
18 March 1953	Patrick William Beresford Brooking, CB, DSO	1896		Retired list since 1950
15 September 1953	Sir William Rudolph Slayter, KCB, DSO, DSC	1896	1971	Retired list 16 December 1954
15 September 1953	Sir Henry William Urquhart McCall, KCVO, KBE, CB, DSO	1895	1980	C-in-C Reserve Fleet 1951–1953; retired list 15 September 1953
15 September 1953	Sir Philip King Enright, KBE, CB	1894	1960	Retired list 15 September 1953
October 1953	Sir Guy Grantham GCB CBE DSO	1900	1992	Retired list 30 April 1959
22 October 1953	Sir Geoffrey Alan Brooke Hawkins, KBE, CB, MVO, DSC	1895	1980	Retired list since 1952
30 March 1954	Sir Charles Edward Lambe GCB CVO	1900	1960	First Sea Lord 1959–1960; promoted to Admiral of the Fleet 1960
November 1954	Sir William Gerrard Andrewes KBE CB DSO	1899	1974	Retired list 10 January 1957
16 December 1954	Sir Charles Thomas Mark Pizey GBE CB DSO	1899	1993	Retired list 15 June 1958
22 April 1955	Sir Ralph Alan Bevan Edwards, KCB, CBE	1901	1963	Controller of the Navy 1953–1956; C-in-C Mediterranean Fleet 1957–1958; retired 1958
1 December 1955	Sir John Arthur Symons Eccles, GCB, KCVO, CBE	1898	1966	C-in-C Home Fleet 1955–1958; retired list 28 February 1958
29 February 1956	Sir Frederick Robertson Parham, GBE, KCB, DSO	1901	1991	C-in-C The Nore 1955–1958; retired list 31 January 1959
30 June 1956	Sir Alan Kenneth Scott-Moncrieff, KCB, CBE, DSO	1900	1980	Retired list 31 January 1958
22 October 1956	Sir William Wellclose Davis, GCB, DSO	1901	1987	Vice-Chief of the Naval Staff 1954–1957; C-in-C Home Fleet 1958–1960; retired list 17 August 1960
January 1957	Sir Caspar John GCB	1903	1984	First Sea Lord 1960–1963; promoted to Admiral of the Fleet 1962
7 January 1958	Sir John Peter Lorne Reid, GCB, CVO	1903	1973	Controller of the Navy 1956–1961; retired list 8 November 1961
31 January 1958	Sir Gerald Vaughan Gladstone, GBE, KCB	1901	1978	C-in-C Far East Fleet 1957–1960; retired list 22 July 1960
31 January 1959	Sir Richard George Onslow, KCB, DSO	1904	1975	C-in-C Plymouth 1958–1961; retired list 2 December 1960
30 April 1959	Sir Walter Thomas Couchman, KCB, CVO, DSO, OBE	1905	1981	Vice Chief of Naval Staff 1960; retired list 10 March 1961
28 July 1959	Sir Robin Leonard Francis Durnford-Slater, KCB	1902	1984	C-in-C The Nore 1958–1961; retired list 12 April 1961
22 July 1960	Sir Manley Laurence Power, KCB, CBE, DSC	1904	1981	C-in-C Portsmouth 1959–1961; retired list 25 October 1961
2 December 1960	Sir Wilfrid John Wentworth Woods, GBE, KCB	1906	1975	C-in-C Home Fleet 1960–1963; C-in-C Portsmouth 1963–1965; retired list 29 September 1965
17 August 1960	Sir Alexander Noel Campbell Bingley, GCB, OBE	1905	1972	C-in-C Mediterranean Fleet 1959–1961; C-in-C Portsmouth 1961–1963
22 August 1960	Sir John David Luce, KCB	1906	1971	First Sea Lord 1963–1966; retired list 15 March 1966
10 March 1961	Sir Douglas Eric Holland-Martin, GCB, DSO, DSC	1906	1977	C-in-C Mediterranean Fleet 1961–1964; retired list 9 February 1966
12 April 1961	Sir Laurence Durlacher, KCB, OBE, DSC	1904	1986	Fifth Sea Lord 1959–1962; retired list 26 January 1962
11 September 1961	Sir St John Reginald Joseph Tyrwhitt, 2nd Bt, KCB, DSO, DSC	1905	1961	
8 November 1961	Sir Charles Madden, 2nd Baronet	1906	2001	Commander-in-Chief Home Fleet 1963–1965; retired list 11 August 1965
26 January 1962	Sir Royston Hollis Wright, GBE, KCB, DSC	1908	1977	Second Sea Lord 1961–1965; retired list 5 June 1965
March 1963	Sir Varyl Cargill Begg, GCB, DSO, DSC	1908	1995	First Sea Lord 1966–1968; promoted to Admiral of the Fleet 1968
14 August 1963	Sir Nigel Stuart Henderson, GBE, KCB	1909	1993	C-in-C Plymouth 1962–1965, Chairman NATO Military Committee 1968-1971; retired 1971
5 June 1965	Sir Desmond Parry Dreyer, GCB, DSC	1910	2003	Retired in 1968
11 August 1965	Sir John Graham Hamilton, GBE, CB	1910	1994	C-in-C Mediterranean 1964–1967
29 September 1965	Sir Michael Le Fanu GCB DSC	1913	1970	First Sea Lord 1968–1970; promoted to Admiral of the Fleet 1970
9 February 1966	Sir John Byng Frewen, GCB	1911	1975	C-in-C Naval Home Command 1969–1970; retired list 21 April 1970
15 March 1966	Sir Frank Henry Edward Hopkins, KCB, DSO	1910	1990	C-in-C Portsmouth 1966–1967
26 December 1967	Sir Frank Roddam Twiss, KCB, KCVO, DSC	1910	1994	Second Sea Lord 1967–1970; retired list 21 April 1970
20 August 1968	Sir John Fitzroy Duyland Bush, GCB, DSC	1914	2013	C-in-C Western Fleet 1967–1970; retired list 4 April 1970
17 September 1968	Sir Horace Rochfort Law, GCB, OBE, DSC	1911	2005	Controller of the Navy 1965–1970; C-in-C Naval Home Command 1970–1972
1 October 1968	Peter John Hill-Norton, Baron Hill-Norton, GCB	1915	2004	First Sea Lord 1970–1971; Chief of the Defence Staff 1971–1974; promoted to Admiral of the Fleet 1971
4 April 1970	Sir William Donough O'Brien, KCB, DSC	1916	2016	C-in-C Western Fleet 1970–1971; retired list 29 November 1971
21 April 1970	Sir Michael Patrick Pollock, GCB, LVO, DSC	1916	2006	First Sea Lord 1971–1974; promoted to Admiral of the Fleet 1974
21 April 1970	Sir Arthur Francis Turner, KCB, DSC	1912	1991	Chief of Fleet Support 1967–1971; retired list 21 August 1971
4 November 1970	Sir Edward Beckwith Ashmore, GCB, DSC	1919	2016	First Sea Lord 1974–1977; Chief of Defence Staff 1977; promoted to Admiral of the Fleet 1977
21 August 1971	Sir Andrew MacKenzie Lewis, KCB	1918	1993	C-in-C Naval Home Command 1972–1974
29 November 1971	Sir Anthony Templer Frederick Griffith Griffin, GCB	1920	1996	Controller of the Navy 1971–1975; retired list 15 December 1975
1 August 1972	Sir Leslie Derek Empson, GBE, KCB	1918	1997	Second Sea Lord 1971–1974; C-in-C Home Command 1974–1975; retired 1976
1 December 1973	Terence Thornton Lewin, Baron Lewin, KG, GCB, LVO, DSC	1920	1999	C-in-C Fleet 1973–1975; C-in-C Naval Home Command 1975–1977; First Sea Lord 1977–1979; Chief of the Defence Staff 1979–1982; promoted to Admiral of the Fleet 1979
13 May 1974	Sir John Rae McKaig, KCB, CBE	1922	1996	Retired list 28 June 1976
8 September 1974	Sir David Williams, GCB	1921	2012	Second Sea Lord 1974–1976; C-in-C Naval Home Command 1976–1979; retired list 4 May 1979
15 December 1975	Sir John Devereux Treacher, KCB	1924	2018	C-in-C Fleet 1975–1977; retired list 31 March 1977
	Sir Ian Easton, KCB, DSC	1917	1989	Retired list 14 March 1978
28 June 1976	Sir Peter White GBE	1919	2010	Chief of Fleet Support 1974–1977; retired list 2 July 1977
9 February 1977	Sir Raymond Derek Lygo, KCB	1924	2012	Vice Chief of Naval Staff 1975–1978; retired list 28 March 1978
30 March 1977	Sir Henry Conyers Leach GCB	1923	2011	First Sea Lord 1979–1982; Admiral of the Fleet 1982
14 March 1978	Sir Allen Gordon Tait, KCB, DSC	1921	2005	Second Sea Lord 1977–1979; retired list 27 September 1979
28 March 1978	Sir Richard Pilkington Clayton, GCB	1925	1984	Controller of the Navy 1975–1979; C-in-C Naval Home Command 1979–1981; retired list 23 July 1981
4 May 1979	Sir James Henry Fuller Eberle, GCB	1927	2018	C-in-C Fleet 1979–1981; C-in-C Naval Home Command 1981–1982; retired list 4 February 1983
6 July 1979	Sir Anthony Storrs Morton, GBE, KCB	1923	2006	Vice-Chief of the Naval Staff 1978–1980; retired list 28 January 1984
27 September 1979	Sir (Arthur) Desmond Cassidi, GCB	1925	2019	C-in-C Naval Home Command 1982–1985; retired list 12 April 1985
23 July 1981	John David Elliott Fieldhouse, Baron Fieldhouse, GCB, GBE	1928	1992	First Sea Lord 1982–1985; Chief of Defence Staff 1985–1988 promoted to Admiral of the Fleet 1985
5 January 1982	Sir William Thomas Pillar GBE, KCB	1924	1999	Commandant RCDS 1982–1984; retired list 6 March 1984
29 October 1982	Sir William Doveton Minet Staveley GCB	1928	1997	First Sea Lord 1985–1989; promoted to Admiral of the Fleet in 1989
10 June 1983	Sir Peter Herbert KCB OBE	1929	2019	Vice-Chief of the Defence Staff 1983–1984; retired list 30 January 1985
1 August 1983	Sir Lindsay Sutherland Bryson, KCB	1925	2005	Controller of the Navy 1981–1984; retired list 11 Jan 1985
15 November 1984	Sir Simon Alistair Cassilis Cassels, KCB, CBE	1928	2019	Second Sea Lord 1982–1986; retired list 4 March 1986
14 February 1985	Sir Peter Stanford GCB, LVO	1929	1991	C-in-C Naval Home Command 1985–1987; retired list 16 September 1987
20 June 1985	Sir Nicholas John Streysham Hunt GCB, LVO	1930	2013	C-in-C Fleet 1985–1987; retired list 26 July 1987
January 1986	Sir Richard George Alison Fitch KCB	1929	1994	Second Sea Lord 1986–1988; retired list 23 November 1988
January 1986	Sir David Hallifax KCB, KCVO, KBE	1927	1992	DSACLANT 1982–1984; Commandant RCDS 1986–1987; retired list 1 March 1988
29 May 1987	Sir Julian Oswald GCB	1933	2001	First Sea Lord 1989–1993; Admiral of the Fleet 1993
21 July 1987	Sir John Forster Woodward, GBE, KCB	1932	2013	C-in-C Naval Home Command 1987–1989
31 July 1987	Infante Juan, Count of Barcelona	1913	1993	Honorary Admiral of the Royal Navy
28 September 1988	Sir Derek Roy Reffell, KCB	1928	2025	Controller of the Navy 1984–1989; retired list 21 October 1989
26 August 1989	Sir Brian Thomas Brown KCB CBE	1934	2020	Second Sea Lord 1988–1991; retired list 26 June 1991
21 April 1989	Sir David Benjamin Bathurst, GCB	1936	2025	First Sea Lord 1993–1995; promoted to Admiral of the Fleet 1995
1989	Sir Jeremy Black GBE, KCB, DSO	1932	2015	C-in-C Naval Home Command 1989–1991
1989	Sir Richard Thomas KCB, KCVO, OBE	1932	1998	DSACLANT 1987–1989; retired list 24 April 1992
January 1991	Sir John Cunningham Kirkwood Slater, GCB, LVO	1938		First Sea Lord 1995–1998; retired list 14 December 1998
1991	Sir Michael Howard Livesay KCB	1936	2003	Second Sea Lord 1991–1993; retired list 26 June 1993
1991	Sir John Beverley Kerr GCB, DL	1937	2019	C-in-C Naval Home Command 1991–1993; retired list 31 May 1994
1992	Sir Hugo Moresby White, GCB, CBE	1939	2014	C-in-C Fleet 1992–1995; retired list 2 May 1997
1993	Sir Kenneth John Eaton, GBE, KCB	1934	2022	Controller of the Navy 1989–1994; retired list 3 August 1994
1993	Sir Michael Henry Gordon Layard KCB, CBE	1936		C-in-C Home Command & Second Sea Lord 1993–1995; retired list 7 August 1995
1995	Sir Peter Charles Abbott, GBE, KCB	1942	2015	DSACLANT 1993–1995, C-in-C Fleet 1995–1997; VCDS 1997–2001; retired list 28 August 2001
25 May 1995	Michael Cecil Boyce, Baron Boyce, KG, GCB, OBE	1943	2022	First Sea Lord 1998–2001; Chief of the Defence Staff 2001–2003; promoted to honorary Admiral of the Fleet 2014
1997	Sir John Richard Brigstocke, KCB	1945	2020	Second Sea Lord 1997–2000
September 1998	Sir Nigel Richard Essenhigh, GCB	1944		First Sea Lord 2001–2002; Retired list 3 December 2002
1998(?)	Sir James Francis Perowne, KBE, KCVO	1947		DSACLANT 1998–2002; retired list 2002
November 2000	Alan William John West, Baron West of Spithead, GCB, DSC	1948		First Sea Lord 2002–2006
September 2001	Sir Ian David Graham Garnett, KCB	1944		DSACLANT 1995–1998
December 2001	Sir Ian Andrew Forbes, KCB, CBE	1946		DSACLANT January–October 2002
August 2002	Sir Jonathon Band, GCB, DL	1950		First Sea Lord 2006–2009
10 July 2004	Sir Mark Stanhope, GCB, OBE	1952		First Sea Lord 2009–2013
15 November 2005	Sir James Michael Burnell-Nugent, KCB, CBE	1949		C-in-C Fleet 2005–2007 retired list 11 April 2008
14 November 2006	King Charles III	1948		Promoted to Admiral of the Fleet in 2012; Lord High Admiral of the United Kingdom since 2022
9 June 2009	Sir Trevor Alan Soar, KCB, OBE	1957		C-in-C Fleet 2009–2012; retired list 17 March 2012
6 January 2012	Sir George Michael Zambellas, GCB, DSC	1958		First Sea Lord 2013–2016; retired list 18 September 2016
15 August 2012	The Princess Anne, Princess Royal, KG, KT, GCVO	1950		Chief Commandant for Women in the Royal Navy
2016	Sir Philip Andrew Jones, GCB	1960		First Sea Lord 2016–2019; Retired list 3 January 2020
May 2019	Sir Timothy Peter Fraser, KCB	1960?		Vice Chief of the Defence Staff 2019–2022; retired list 1 December 2022
June 2019	Sir Antony David Radakin, GBE, KCB	1965		First Sea Lord 2019–2021; Chief of the Defence Staff 2021–2025; retired list 9 November 2025
8 November 2021	Sir Benjamin John Key, KCB, CBE	1965		First Sea Lord 2021–2025
17 July 2023	Sir Keith Edward Blount, KCB, OBE	1966		DSACEUR 2023–2026; retired list 20 June 2026

== See also ==
- List of senior officers of the Royal Navy
- List of British Army full generals
- List of Royal Marines full generals
- List of Royal Air Force air chief marshals
- List of Royal Navy vice admirals
- List of Royal Navy rear admirals
