= Admiral Hotham =

Admiral Hotham may refer to:

- Alan Geoffrey Hotham (1876–1965), British Royal Navy admiral
- Charles Frederick Hotham (1843–1925), British Royal Navy Admiral of the Fleet
- Henry Hotham (1777–1833), British Royal Navy vice admiral
- William Hotham, 1st Baron Hotham (1736–1813), British Royal Navy admiral
- William Hotham (Royal Navy officer, born 1772), British Royal Navy admiral
- William Hotham (Royal Navy officer, born 1794), British Royal Navy admiral
