= William Hotham =

Several admirals of the Royal Navy were named William Hotham:

- William Hotham, 1st Baron Hotham (1736–1813), Royal Navy admiral
- Sir William Hotham (Royal Navy officer, born 1772), Royal Navy admiral
- William Hotham (Royal Navy officer, born 1794), Royal Navy admiral
