= Samuel Alfred Warner =

British fraudster (c.1793–1853)

- Born: c. 1793; Heathfield, East Sussex, England
- Died: December 1853; England
- Burial place: Brompton Cemetery, London
- Occupation: Inventor
- Known for: Claimed inventions of naval weapons
- Spouse: Unknown (widow at death)
- Children: 7

Samuel Alfred Warner (c.1793–1853) was an English inventor of naval weapons, now considered a charlatan.

== Life ==
Warner was born at Heathfield, East Sussex, son of William Warner who was a carpenter and reputed smuggler of Faversham. He knew a London chemist called Garrald, and was working with him in 1819 on an explosive. He took service with Pedro I of Brazil in Portugal, and on his return to England found some support from William IV for his claims to have secret weapons.

The King appointed Admiral Richard Goodwin Keats, then Governor of the Royal Hospital Greenwich to investigate. Then admiral Sir Thomas Hardy was called in to assist. Warner died in obscure circumstances in the early days of December 1853, and was buried in Brompton cemetery, west London, on the 10th. He left a widow and seven children.

== Claimed inventions ==
From 1830 to the date of his death Warner pressed claims for two inventions. These were the "invisible shell" (reconstructed as a type of high explosive underwater mine), and the "long range", possibly a balloon fitted to drop the "invisible shells" automatically: it emerged eventually that Warner had secretly set up an unsuccessful trial with Charles Green and an unmanned balloon. A demonstration of 1841 on a lake in Essex saw a boat blown up, watched by a group including Sir Robert Peel.

Small committees were appointed to examine and experiment on these inventions, but Warner refused to show or in any way explain his secrets till he was assured of the payment of £200,000 for each. In 1842 a committee of Sir Thomas Byam Martin and Sir Howard Douglas questioned Warner. He stated that his father was William Warner, who in 1812 had owned and commanded the Nautilus, hired by the government for covert work in espionage; that he himself had served with his father in the Nautilus, and had, towards the end of the Napoleonic Wars, by means of his invention, destroyed two of the enemy's privateers. There was no verification and the account was marred by anachronisms.

At the same period Warner's claims were assessed by Lieutenant-Colonel Chalmer of the Royal Artillery, and Commander James Crawford Caffin.

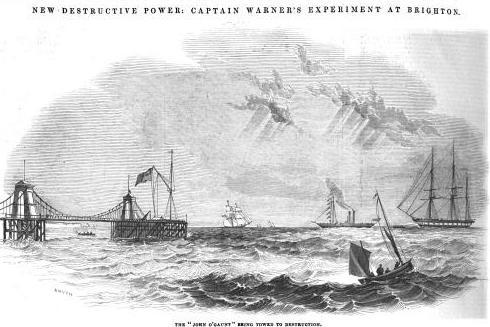
Illustration from the Illustrated London News of the 1844 alleged demonstration of Warner's "invisible shell"

A further demonstration in the English Channel off Brighton in 1844 showed a target vessel being towed at sea detonated at a signal. It was well attended, but left unresolved the value of what had been seen.

Warner claimed that Keats and Hardy had authored a report in support of the invention, and presented a purported copy. It was noted in parliament that no other copy was to be found. Keats and Hardy were long since dead, and it was noted it was singular they should die, and no copy be found, it being notorious they were both men of business and not likely to have lost their papers. It was concluded no such report existed.

The supposed inventions were displayed in the West End Gallery at the great Exhibition of 1851, still claiming the support of Keats and Hardy, but it progressed no further. In 1852 the matter was again brought up in the House of Lords, on 14 May, and a committee was appointed to inquire into it. A week later, on 21 May, the Duke of Wellington intervened, pointing out that the inquiry was one of a scientific nature, and that it had been entrusted to the Ordnance Department. With this the matter appears to have been dropped. The committee never reported.

== See also ==
- Harry Grindell Matthews

== Notes ==
Attribution

This article incorporates text from a publication now in the public domain: Lee, Sidney, ed. (1899). "Warner, Samuel Alfred". Dictionary of National Biography. Vol. 59. London: Smith, Elder & Co.
