= Thomas MacGill =

Royal Navy Admiral (1850–1926)

Admiral Thomas MacGill CB
- Allegiance: United Kingdom
- Branch: Royal Navy
- Rank: Admiral

Admiral Thomas MacGill, CB (16 August 1850 – 16 April 1926) was a Royal Navy officer who fought in several of the British Empire's "little wars" during the 19th century.

== Life and career ==
Born at Clapham, MacGill was the son of the Rev. Thomas MacGill, of Clapham. He was educated at Western College in Brighton before joining the Royal Navy as a cadet in HMS Britannia in December 1863. As a sub-lieutenant, he served on the screw sloop HMS Camelion in the Pacific. Promoted to lieutenant in 1874, he was then with the screw gun vessel HMS Plover on the North American Station.

MacGill specialized in navigation, and was the navigator of the screw sloop HMS Vestal in the East Indies from 1878 to 1880. In March 1881, he was appointed navigating officer of the troopship HMS Humber. In her, he took part in the Anglo-Egyptian War of 1882, receiving the Egypt Medal and the Khedive's Bronze Star. In July 1883, he was appointed harbour master at Suakin during military operations in the Eastern Sudan; for this service he was mentioned in despatches, awarded the Suakin clasp to his Egypt Medal, and promoted to commander "for services rendered in the Red Sea littoral in connexion with the Suakin Expeditionary Force". From 1886 to 1889, he was navigating officer of HMS Alexandra, flagship of Admiral HRH The Duke of Edinburgh, Commander-in-Chief of the Mediterranean Fleet. In 1889, he brought back to England HMS Sultan, which had been shipwrecked and raised in Malta.

Promoted to captain in June 1892, he commanded the second-class protected cruiser HMS Thetis from July to August 1893 and the protected cruiser HMS Iphigenia from July to August 1894. In February 1895, he was given command of the third-class cruiser HMS Phoebe on the Cape and West Africa Station. The same year, he landed from Phoebe in command of the second division of Admiral Harry Rawson's punitive expedition against the Arab chief M'baruk, and was present at the capture of Mwele on 17 August. For his part in the Mwele campaign, he received the East and West Africa Medal with "MWELE 1895" engraved on the rim. He also took part in the punitive Benin Expedition of 1897, and was appointed a Companion of the Order of the Bath for services during the campaign.

Returning to England, MacGill commanded the second-class protected cruiser HMS Severn on coast guard service at Harwich from 1898 to 1899. He was Naval Captain in Charge, Bermuda Royal Dockyard and Senior Naval Officer there from 1889 to 1902. After commanding the battleship HMS Royal Sovereign from 1902 to 1903, he was Captain Superintendent (later Admiral Superintendent) of Contract Built Ships, Liverpool and Barrow from 1903 to 1906. Promoted to rear-admiral in 1904, he retired at his own request in 1906, but served as Admiral Superintendent of Contract Built Ships, Tyne and Southern District from 1906 to 1909.

He was promoted to vice-admiral on the retired list in 1908 and admiral on the retired list in 1913. Owing to his age he took no part in the First World War.

MacGill died at Victoria Cottage East Cowes on 16 April 1926, at the home of his son Lieutenant-Commander MacGill, RN. He was buried "very quietly" at Whippingham, Isle of Wright on 20 April. King George V, who as Prince George of Wales was a lieutenant in the Alexandra with MacGill, sent his condolences.

MacGill married Maria West, daughter of Thomas West, in 1884; they had at least two sons.
