= Robert Nesham Bax =

Royal Navy Admiral (1875–1969)

Portrait by Walter Stoneman, 1919

Admiral Robert Nesham Bax, CB (1875 – 21 September 1969) was a British Royal Navy officer.

Then son of Captain Bonham Bax, RN, and Emily Harris Bax, daughter of Colonel Nesham of the Rifle Brigade, Robert Bax was educated at Kelly College, Tavistock. He entered HMS Britannia in 1889, was promoted to lieutenant in 1896, commander in 1905, and captain in 1913. In 1900, he was awarded the Royal Humane Society's bronze medal for saving a man at Chatham.

Bax was appointed to command the battleship HMS Triumph in 1912 and HMS Prince of Wales in 1913, In the Prince of Wales, he took part in the Dardanelles campaign and the landing at Anzac Cove during the First World War. In 1916, he assumed command of HMS Lord Nelson. He also saw active service in the Channel, Adriatic, and Aegean squadrons. He was appointed a Companion of the Order of the Bath in 1918.

== Family ==
His grandson Michael Bax was High Sheriff of Kent for 2012.
