= John Robert Ebenezer Pattisson =

Royal Navy Admiral (1844–1928)

Admiral John Robert Ebenezer Pattisson (10 December 1844 – 13 February 1928) was a Royal Navy officer.

Pattison was promoted to rear-admiral on 26 October 1899, to vice-admiral on 26 November 1904, and retired from the navy on the following day. He was later promoted admiral on the retired list on 30 June 1908.
