= James Crawford Caffin =

Royal Navy Admiral (1812–1883)

Sir James Crawford Caffin
- Born: 1812
- Died: 1883 (aged 70–71)
- Occupation: Royal Navy officer

Sir James Crawford Caffin (1812–1883) was a British Royal Navy officer, who rose to the rank of Admiral.

== Life ==
He was son of William Caffin of the Royal Laboratory, Woolwich. He entered the navy in 1824, and in 1827 was midshipman of the frigate HMS Cambrian at the Battle of Navarino, and when she was wrecked off Carabusa on 31 January 1828.

In August 1831 Caffin passed his examination, and in October 1834 was appointed to the shore establishment (or "stone frigate") HMS Excellent, then recently organised as a school of gunnery. He went on to serve for two years as gunnery-mate of HMS Asia in the Mediterranean, and on his promotion to the rank of lieutenant, 28 June 1838, he was again appointed to Excellent, in which, with but a short break, he remained for the next three years.

Caffin was made commander on 7 March 1842, and studied for some months at the Royal Naval College at Portsmouth. He was appointed, together with an artillery officer, to investigate and report on a celebrated claim to invention, Samuel Alfred Warner's "Long Range" secret weapon. The report was unfavourable, and the reputation of Warner's alleged invention waned.

In February 1845 Caffin was one of a commission for experimenting on the relative merits of paddle and screw; and their report paved the way for the general introduction of the screw-propeller into the navy. On 11 October 1847 he was advanced to post rank; in 1854 he commanded HMS Penelope in the Baltic, and was present at the reduction of Bomarsund; and in 1855 he commanded HMS Hastings at the bombardment of Sveaborg, when, with the other captains, he was made a C.B. on 5 July.

On his return from the Baltic Caffin was appointed director-general of naval ordnance, and vice-president of the ordnance select committee at the War Office. In 1858 he was appointed director of stores in the war department, an office which he held till 1868. On his retirement he was made a civil K.C.B. He had previously, 2 December 1865, attained his flag-rank, but, not having served his time at sea, was placed on the retired list, on which he duly advanced to the higher grades—vice-admiral, 2 November 1871, and admiral, 1 August 1877.

Caffin died on 24 May 1883 at Blackheath, London, where he had lived for several years, the centre of a religious society.

== Family ==
Caffin married in 1843 Frances, daughter of William Atfield of Cosham, Hampshire, who died in 1871. His son Crawford, a commander in the navy, received his promotion for his services in the transport department during the Anglo-Zulu War in 1879.

== Notes ==
Attribution

This article incorporates text from a publication now in the public domain: Stephen, Leslie, ed. (1886). "Caffin, James Crawford". Dictionary of National Biography. Vol. 8. London: Smith, Elder & Co.
