= Gerald Charles Langley =

Royal Navy Admiral (1848–1914)

Admiral Gerald Charles Langley (13 October 1848 – 18 April 1914) was a Royal Navy officer.

== Navy career ==
Langley was a captain in command of HMS Nile, port guard ship at Plymouth, from 1899. The Nile was flag ship for Admiral Lord Charles Scott, Commander-in-Chief, Plymouth from March 1900.

He was promoted to rear-admiral on 1 July 1902, and to vice-admiral in 1906.
