= William Hotham (Royal Navy officer, born 1794) =

Royal Navy Admiral (1794–1873)

Admiral William Hotham, KH (30 July 1794 – 22 February 1873) was a British Royal Navy officer.

He was born in Yorkshire, the eldest son of Lieutenant-Colonel George Hotham and Caroline Gee. He joined the Royal Navy at the age of 10, initially serving under the command of his uncle, Admiral William Hotham, GCB.

From 1805 to 1814 he served on the Mediterranean Station and was present at the capture of Capri and the Siege of Gaeta in 1806. He was then involved in the disastrous Walcheren Campaign of 1809 and the Siege of Cádiz in 1810, taking part in the defence of the nearby Fort Matagorda.

In 1811 he was posted to the Adriatic and promoted lieutenant the following year. There he took part in the capture of Fiume on 3 July 1813, the storming and capture of the fortress of Farasina, and the capture of the arsenal at Trieste. For the next year he commanded a small fleet which operated on the River Po assisting the Austrian Army and was promoted commander in 1814.

In January 1836 Hotham was made a Knight of the Royal Guelphic Order (KH) and retired in October 1846. He was advanced on the Retired List to the rank of retired vice-admiral in 1858 and retired admiral in 1863.

He died unmarried in York in 1873 and is buried in York Cemetery.
