= List of shipwrecks in March 1857 =

The list of shipwrecks in March 1857 includes ships sunk, wrecked or otherwise lost during March 1857.

== 1 March ==
List of shipwrecks: 1 March 1857
Ship	State	Description
City of Madras	United Kingdom	The ship was wrecked at Corsewall Point, Wigtownshire. Her crew survived. She was on a voyage from Glasgow, Renfrewshire to Calcutta, India.
Deux Frères	France	The schooner was driven ashore and wrecked at Málaga, Spain.
Fanny Huntley	United Kingdom	The brig was driven ashore at Calais, France. She was on a voyage from Middlesbrough Yorkshire to London. She was refloated and resumed her voyage.
Isabella Croll	United Kingdom	The steamship was holed by an anchor and sank at Cardiff, Glamorgan.
Jason	United Kingdom	The brig collided with the barque Duchesse de Brabant (Belgium) and foundered 20 nautical miles (37 km) south south west of The Lizard, Cornwall with the loss of her captain. Survivors were rescued by Duchesse de Brabant. Jason was on a voyage from Scala Nuova, Ottoman Empire to Cork and Dunkirk, Nord, France.
Star	United Kingdom	The ship was driven ashore near Calais. She was on a voyage from Newcastle upon Tyne, Northumberland to Porto, Portugal.
Virginia	United States	The ship departed from New York for Youghal, County Cork, United Kingdom. No further trace, presumed foundered with the loss of all hands.

== 2 March ==
List of shipwrecks: 2 March 1857
Ship	State	Description
Annabella	United Kingdom	The smack sprang a leak and sank in the Pentland Firth. She was on a voyage from Scrabster, Caithness to Liverpool, Lancashire.
Lark	United Kingdom	The smack struck a rock and sank in the River Fowey.
Mary Howe	United Kingdom	The ship ran aground on the Goodwin Sands, Kent. She was on a voyage from South Shields, County Durham to Porto, Portugal. She was refloated.
Reaper	United Kingdom	The sloop was in collision with the fishing smack Blue-Eyed Maid (United Kingdom) and sank in the English Channel east of Dungeness, Kent. Her crew were rescued by Blue-Eyed Maid. Reaper was on a voyage from Sunderland, County Durham to Portsmouth, Hampshire.
Susan	United Kingdom	The brig was driven ashore and wrecked near Cape Nagara, Ottoman Empire. Her crew were rescued. She was on a voyage from Galaţi, Moldavia to a British port. She was consequently condemned.

== 3 March ==
List of shipwrecks: 3 March 1857
Ship	State	Description
Eleanor	United Kingdom	The brig was driven ashore and wrecked on the Mull of Oa, Islay with the loss of a crew member.
Gaston	Belgium	The schooner was wrecked at Dénia, Spain with the loss of three of her crew.
Ocean Queen	United Kingdom	The ship was wrecked on a reef 8 nautical miles (15 km) off Nyuti Island. She was on a voyage from Bombay, India to London.
HMS Urgent	Royal Navy	The troopship sprang a leak in the Bay of Biscay. She put in to A Coruña, Spain in a sinking condition.
William Denny	(United Kingdom of Great Britain and Ireland) New Zealand	The steamship went ashore near North Cape in heavy fog whilst en route from Auckland to Sydney, New South Wales. All on board were rescued. She was later refloated and placed under repair, but was wrecked in a gale on 7 June 1858.
Zetland	(United Kingdom of Great Britain and Ireland) British North America	The brig sprang a leak and capsized in the Atlantic Ocean. Her crew were rescued by Jane (United Kingdom). Zetland was on a voyage from Saint John, New Brunswick to Puerto Rico.

== 4 March ==
List of shipwrecks: 4 March 1857
Ship	State	Description
Alert	United Kingdom	The ship ran aground at Findhorn, Moray. She was on a voyage from Sunderland, County Durham to Cromarty.
Mary Eliza	United States	The schooner was abandoned in the Atlantic Ocean. Her crew were rescued by General Willshire (United States).
Nancy	United Kingdom	The ship foundered off the mouth of the Humber. Her crew were rescued. She was on a voyage from Hull, Yorkshire to Newcastle upon Tyne, Northumberland.
Saracen	United States	The ship ran aground on the Hastings Shoal, in the Irrawaddy River. She was refloated and resumed her voyage.

== 5 March ==
List of shipwrecks: 5 March 1857
Ship	State	Description
Antoine et Jean	France	The ship was wrecked near Benicàssim, Spain. Her crew were rescued.
Branch	United Kingdom	The ship ran aground and sank near Hollum, Friesland, Netherlands. All on board were rescued. She was on a voyage from Sunderland, County Durham to Harburg, Hamburg.
Gaston	Belgium	The schooner was wrecked near Oliva, Spain with the loss of five of her crew.
Hebe	Austrian Empire	The schooner was wrecked near Oliva with the loss of two of her crew. She was on a voyage from Constantinople, Ottoman Empire to Marseille, Bouches-du-Rhône, France.
Laurentine and Emilia	Flag unknown	The ship was wrecked at Japara Point, Netherlands East Indies. All on board were rescued. She was on a voyage from Samarang to Surabaya.
Möwe	Hamburg	The steamship was wrecked on the Droogden. Her crew were rescued. She was on a voyage from Newcastle upon Tyne, Northumberland, United Kingdom to Flensburg, Duchy of Holstein.

== 6 March ==
List of shipwrecks: 6 March 1857
Ship	State	Description
Defence	United Kingdom	The full-rigged ship was driven ashore and wrecked at Cape Town, Cape Colony. She was on a voyage from Manila, Spanish East Indies to Cork.
Edward	United Kingdom	The ship sank between Looe Island and Rame Head, Cornwall. Her crew were rescued. She was on a voyage from Penryn, Cornwall to Plymouth, Devon.
Triton	United Kingdom	The ship departed from Sunderland, County Durham for Bruges, West Flanders, Belgium. No further trace, presumed foundered with the loss of all hands, possibly on the night of 8–9 March.

== 7 March ==
List of shipwrecks: 7 March 1857
Ship	State	Description
Alice Mondell	United States	The whaler ran aground on the Pratas Shoal, in the South China Sea and was wrecked. Her crew took to four boats. Three of them had reached Hong Kong by 15 April.
John and Albert	United States	The brig was abandoned in the Atlantic Ocean. Her crew were rescued by New England (United States). John and Albert was on a voyage from Philadelphia, Pennsylvania to Charleston, South Carolina.
Nonpareil	United Kingdom	The ship ran aground at Billing Point. She was on a voyage from Philadelphia, Pennsylvania, United States to Liverpool, Lancashire. She was refloated and taken in tow.
Smuggler	United Kingdom	The schooner was in collision with the steamship Teutonia (Hamburg) and sank in the Bay of Biscay with the loss of four of her five crew. Her captain survived. She was on a voyage from Cardiff, Glamorgan to A Coruña, Spain.
Stag	United Kingdom	The paddle steamer ran aground at Black Head, Wigtownshire. Her passengers were taken off by Cambria (United Kingdom). Stag was on a voyage from Greenock, Renfrewshire to Belfast, County Antrim. She was refloated with assistance from Cambria and the tug Premier (United Kingdom).

== 8 March ==
List of shipwrecks: 8 March 1857
Ship	State	Description
James and Francis	United Kingdom	The ship foundered in the North Sea. Her crew were rescued. She was on a voyage from South Shields, County Durham to Hamburg.
James Daly	United Kingdom	The ship was wrecked near the Cape Coast Castle, Gold Coast. Her crew were rescued.
Nancy	United Kingdom	The brig was wrecked on the Gunfleet Sand, in the North Sea off the coast of Essex. Her crew were rescued by the smack Liberty (United Kingdom). Nancy was on a voyage from South Shields, County Durham to London.
Trine	Denmark	The ship was sighted off Fredrikshavn whilst on a voyage from Horsens to London. No further trace, presumed foundered with the loss of all hands.

== 9 March ==
List of shipwrecks: 9 March 1857
Ship	State	Description
Carmen	Peru	The full-rigged ship was set afire by some of the 200 coolies on board and sank in the Indian Ocean with much loss of life. There were at least seven survivors, some of whom were rescued by Henrietta Maria (Netherlands). Carmen was on a voyage from Swatow, China to Callao.
Dart	United Kingdom	The smack foundered off Portland Bill, Dorset with the loss of two of the four people on board. Survivors were rescued by the fishing smack Victorine Desirée (France). Dart was on a voyage from Alderney, Channel Islands to Lyme Regis, Dorset.
Grace	United Kingdom	The brig was driven ashore near Cleethorpes, Lincolnshire. Her crew were rescued. She was on a voyage from Middlesbrough, Yorkshire to Hamburg. Grace was refloated on 10 March.
Majestic	United Kingdom	The schooner sprang a leak and was abandoned in the Atlantic Ocean (41°00′N 12°50′W). Her crew were rescued by the schooner Neve (Denmark). Majestic was on a voyage from Seville, Spain to London.
Mexicain	France	The paquebot was struck by lightning and set afire north of Cuba. All on board were rescued. She was on a voyage from Bordeaux, Gironde to Veracruz, Mexico.
Minna Muller	Netherlands	The schooner was wrecked on the Paedermarkt with the loss of all hands. She was on a voyage from Amsterdam, North Holland to Buenos Aires, Argentina.
Mohi	United Kingdom	The brig foundered in the Adriatic Sea 50 nautical miles (93 km) east of Carbonara di Bari, Kingdom of the Two Sicilies. Her crew were rescued. She was on a voyage from Troon, Ayrshire to Salonica, Greece.
Sarah	United Kingdom	The brig was driven ashore at Tetney Haven, Lincolnshire. Her crew were rescued. She was on a voyage from London to South Shields. She was refloated on 12 March and taken in to Grimsby, Lincolnshire.

== 10 March ==
List of shipwrecks: 10 March 1857
Ship	State	Description
Ann	United Kingdom	The brig foundered in the North Sea. Her crew were rescued by a galiot. She was on a voyage from South Shields, County Durham to Hamburg.
Anna Elize	Bremen	The ship ran aground on the Goodwin Sands, Kent, United Kingdom. She was on a voyage from Bremen to Newport, Monmouthshire, United Kingdom.
Express	Prussia	The ship, which had struck a sunken object 30 nautical miles (56 km) west of Cape St. Vincent, Portugal and become leaky, was driven ashore near Cape St. Mary, Portugal whilst attempting to put in to Málaga, Spain. She was on a voyage from Huelva, Spain to Newcastle upon Tyne, Northumberland, United Kingdom.
George Dean	(United Kingdom of Great Britain and Ireland) Jersey	The ship was abandoned in the Atlantic Ocean. Her crew were rescued by the barque L'Utile (France). George Dean was on a voyage from Lagos, Africa to London.
Hunter	United Kingdom	The brig was abandoned in the North Sea. Her crew were rescued. She was on a voyage from Hartlepool, County Durham to Hamburg.
Ruby	United Kingdom	The ship was driven ashore at Brouwershaven, Zeeland, Netherlands with the loss of two of her crew. She was on a voyage from South Shields, County Durham to Rotterdam, South Holland, Netherlands.
Union	United Kingdom	The brig was wrecked on the Droogden. She was on a voyage from Sunderland, County Durham to Stettin.

== 11 March ==
List of shipwrecks: 11 March 1857
Ship	State	Description
Mayflower	United Kingdom	The ship ran aground. She was on a voyage from London to Newcastle upon Tyne, Northumberland. She was refloated and put in to Harwich, Essex in a leaky condition.
Robert	United Kingdom	The sloop departed from Sunderland, County Durham for Banff, Aberdeenshire. No further trace presumed foundered with the loss of all hands.
Samuel	United Kingdom	The ship was driven ashore at the Point of Ayre, Isle of Man. She was on a voyage from Ardrossan, Ayrshire to Runcorn, Cheshire. She had become a wreck by 21 March.

== 12 March ==
List of shipwrecks: 12 March 1857
Ship	State	Description
Atlas	United Kingdom	The collier, a brig ran aground on Scharhörn. Her crew survived. She was on a voyage from Hartlepool, County Durham to Hamburg.
Gwen	United Kingdom	The schooner was driven ashore at Ennishowen Head, County Donegal. She was on a voyage from Liverpool, Lancashire to Londonderry.
Krodesen	Norway	The barque was driven ashore at Chibburn, Northumberland, United Kingdom. She was on a voyage from Tønsberg to Newcastle upon Tyne, Northumberland.
Laura	(United Kingdom of Great Britain and Ireland) Tobago	The schooner was driven ashore and wrecked. She was on a voyage from Scarborough Bay to Goldsborough Bay.

== 13 March ==
List of shipwrecks: 13 March 1857
Ship	State	Description
Bland	United Kingdom	The ship was driven ashore and wrecked at Ballycastle, County Antrim.
Brothers	United Kingdom	The ship was driven ashore and wrecked at Kilrush, County Clare.
Duke of Brontë	United Kingdom	The ship was driven ashore and wrecked at Kilrush. She was on a voyage from Alloa, Clackmannanshire to Demerara, British Guiana. She was refloated on 28 March and towed in to Limerick, where she was found to be severely damaged.
Ebenezer	United Kingdom	The ship was driven ashore at Bridport, Dorset. She was on a voyage from Jersey, Channel Islands to Bridport. She was refloated on 28 March and taken in to Bridport.
Ellen	United Kingdom	The schooner was driven ashore and wrecked at Kilmore, County Wexford.
Hertha	United Kingdom	The ship ran aground at Margate, Kent. She was on a voyage from South Shields, County Durham to Naples, Kingdom of the Two Sicilies. She was refloated and taken in to Ramsgate, Kent where she was holed by her anchor.
McLellans	United Kingdom	The ship was driven ashore and wrecked at Ennishowen Head, County Donegal.
My Choice	United Kingdom	The schooner was driven ashore and wrecked at Kilrush.
Owen	United Kingdom	The schooner was driven ashore at Ennishowen Head. She was on a voyage from Liverpool, Lancashire to Londonderry. She was refloated.
Swift	United Kingdom	The ship struck a sunken object in the North Sea and became leaky. She was abandoned the next day 120 nautical miles (220 km) north west of Heligoland. Her crew were rescued by Sophia (Norway). Swift was on a voyage from Hartlepool, County Durha to Hamburg.

== 14 March ==
List of shipwrecks: 14 March 1857
Ship	State	Description
Aetos	United States	The ship ran aground on the Gull Sand, in the Thames Estuary. She was on a voyage from Bombay, India to London, United Kingdom. She was refloated and completed her voyage in a leaky condition.
HEIC Auckland	India	Second Opium War: The steamship ran aground in Toong Chung Bay whilst attacking Chinese junks. She was later refloated.
Catherine	United Kingdom	The ship ran aground at Kiel, Prussia. She was on a voyage from Newcastle upon Tyne, Northumberland to Kiel. She was refloated and taken in to Kiel.
Chilion	United Kingdom	The brigantine was driven ashore near Carrickfergus, County Antrim. She was on a voyage from Liverpool, Lancashire to Tralee, County Kerry. She was refloated the next day and taken in to Belfast, County Antrim.
Desiree	United Kingdom	The schooner was driven ashore and wrecked at Padstow, Cornwall with the loss of one of here five crew. Survivors were rescued by the Padstow Lifeboat. She was on a voyage from Cardiff, Glamorgan to Nantes, Loire-Inférieure, France.
Henry	United Kingdom	The ship was driven ashore at Holehaven Creek, Essex with the loss of her captain.
Hibernia	United Kingdom	The ship was driven ashore and wrecked on the Trebetherick Rocks, on the Cornish coast. Her four crew were rescued by the Padstow Lifeboat.
Lord Byron	United Kingdom	The ship was driven ashore at Ballina, County Mayo.
Milka	United Kingdom	The ship ran aground on the Sheringham Shoal, in the North Sea off the coast of Norfolk. She was on a voyage from Alexandria, Egypt to Hull, Yorkshire. She was refloated and taken in to Great Yarmouth, Norfolk.
Sir Edward Banks	United Kingdom	The schooner was driven ashore and severely damaged at St. Monans, Fife. She was on a voyage from the River Tyne to Aberdeen.
Three Sisters	United Kingdom	The ship was abandoned off Great Orme Head, Caernarfonshire. Her crew were rescued. She was on a voyage from Liverpool, Lancashire to Bayonne, Basses-Pyrénées.

== 15 March ==
List of shipwrecks: 15 March 1857
Ship	State	Description
Anne	United Kingdom	The whaler was driven ashore in Yell Sound. She was refloated and resumed her voyage to the Davis Strait.
George Metcalf	United Kingdom	The ship ran aground at Havre de Grâce, Seine-Inférieure, France. She was on a voyage from the Chinchas Islands, Peru to Havre de Grâce. She was refloated and taken in to Havre de Grâce in a leaky condition.
Juanita	Spain	The schooner foundered in the Bristol Channel off Swansea, Glamorgan, United Kingdom. Her crew were rescued. She was on a voyage from Swansea to Seville.
Margaret	United Kingdom	The brig was driven ashore near Tylstrup, Denmark. She was on a voyage from Sunderland, County Durham to Stettin. She was refloated and resumed her voyage.
Maria Jacoba	Netherlands	The East Indiaman ran aground on the Varne Sand, in the English Channel and sank. Her sixteen crew were rescued by the smack Jean Marie (France). Maria Jacoba was on a voyage from Banjoewangi, Netherlands East Indies to Amsterdam, North Holland.
Melbourne	United Kingdom	The ship was driven ashore at Southport, Lancashire. She was on a voyage from Saint John, New Brunswick to Liverpool, Lancashire.
Resolution	United Kingdom	The sloop was driven ashore and wrecked at Boulmer, Northumberland. Her crew were rescued.
Twin Sisters	United Kingdom	The ship foundered off Great Orme Head, Caernarfonshire. Her crew were rescued by the pilot boat No. 6 (United Kingdom). Twin Sisters was on a voyage from Liverpool, Lancashire to Bayonne, Basses-Pyrénées, France.
William Owens	United Kingdom	The ship was driven ashore at Fleetwood, Lancashire. She was on a voyage from Africa to Liverpool. She had been refloated by 23 March and taken in to Fleetwood.

== 16 March ==
List of shipwrecks: 16 March 1857
Ship	State	Description
Frigga	Prussia	The barque ran aground at Alt Skagen, Denmark. Her crew were rescued. She was on a voyage from Sunderland, County Durham, United Kingdom to Danzig.
Gipsey or Gipsy	United Kingdom	The full-rigged ship was wrecked on an uncharted shoal in the Caramata Passage, Dutch East Indies, on a voyage from Batavia to Singapore; all 18 crew rescued.
Mary Ann	United Kingdom	The cutter was driven ashore and wrecked at Amlwch, Anglesey.
Sea	United States	The ship ran aground on the Duddon Bank, in the Irish Sea off the coast of Cumberland, United Kingdom. She was on a voyage from New Orleans, Louisiana to Liverpool, Lancashire, United Kingdom.
Vixen	United Kingdom	The ship was wrecked at Margate, Kent.

== 17 March ==
List of shipwrecks: 17 March 1857
Ship	State	Description
Curlew	United Kingdom	The barque was driven ashore and wrecked at Saint John, New Brunswick, British North America. Her crew were rescued. She was on a voyage from New York, United States to Halifax, Nova Scotia, British North America.
Defiance	United Kingdom	The ship ran aground off Heligoland and was damaged. She was on a voyage from Middlesbrough, Yorkshire to Harburg. She was later refloated and taken in to Blakeney, Norfolk, where she arrived on 27 March in a leaky condition.
Kathleen	United Kingdom	The ship ran aground on the Whitby Rock. She was on a voyage from Hartlepool, County Durham to London. She was refloated and put back to Hartlepool in a leaky condition.
Mexico	United Kingdom	The ship was wrecked at the mouth of the Rhône. She was on a voyage from Swansea, Glamorgan to Marseille, Bouches-du-Rhône, France.
Sarah	(United Kingdom of Great Britain and Ireland) British North America	The brig was dismasted and became waterlogged in the Gulf Stream. Her crew were taken off by the schooner Cruz III (Portugal) before she foundered. Sarah was on a voyage from the Turks Islands to Halifax, Nova Scotia.
William Thomas	United Kingdom	The barque was driven ashore at Tacumshane, County Wexford. Her crew were rescued.

== 18 March ==
List of shipwrecks: 18 March 1857
Ship	State	Description
Bardsea	United Kingdom	The ship was driven ashore at Rampside, Cumberland.
Edward Johnston	United Kingdom	The ship was abandoned in the Atlantic Ocean. Her crew were rescued by the whaler Adeline (United States). Edward Johnston was on a voyage from the Chincha Islands, Peru to Cork.
Hosten	Denmark	The brig ran aground off Rugaard and was wrecked. She was on a voyage from Liverpool, Lancashire to Svendborg.
Knickerbocker	United Kingdom	The ship was driven ashore at the "Piele of Foudry", Lancashire. She was on a voyage from New Orleans, Louisiana, United States to Liverpool.
Margaret Robertson	United Kingdom	The ship was wrecked at Aalborg, Denmark with the loss of her captain.
Petronella	Netherlands	The ship was in collision with the steamship Black Diamond (United Kingdom) and sank off the Middle Lightship ( Trinity House). Her crew were rescued.
Skagen Frigga	Denmark	The ship was wrecked at Aalborg. Her crew were rescued. She was on a voyage from Sunderland, County Durham to Danzig.
Snelheid	Netherlands	The barque was wrecked on the Coblers Rocks, off Barbados with the loss of seven of her twelve crew. She was on a voyage from Paramaibo, Brazil to Amsterdam, North Holland.

== 19 March ==
List of shipwrecks: 19 March 1857
Ship	State	Description
Tasmania	United Kingdom	The ship was wrecked at the Cape Elizabeth Lights, Maine, United States. Her crew were rescued. She was on a voyage from Nassau, Bahamas to Portland, Maine, United States.

== 20 March ==
List of shipwrecks: 20 March 1857
Ship	State	Description
Celerity	United Kingdom	The brig was driven ashore and wrecked at Whitby, Yorkshire. Her crew were rescued.
Clemence	France	The schooner was wrecked near Cádiz, Spain. Her crew were rescued. She was on a voyage from Swansea, Glamorgan, United Kingdom to Marseille, Bouches-du-Rhône.
Douglas	United Kingdom	The schooner was driven ashore at Ramsey, Isle of Man. She was on a voyage from Liverpool, Lancashire to Newcastle upon Tyne, Northumberland.
Fox	United Kingdom	The schooner was wrecked on the Annot Sand, off Montrose, Forfarshire. Her crew were rescued by the Montrose Lifeboat. She was on a voyage from Port Dinorwic, Caernarfonshire to Newcastle upon Tyne.
Hannah	United Kingdom	The schooner was driven ashore and wrecked at Sunderland, County Durham. Her crew were rescued. She was on a voyage from Arbroath, Forfarshire to Sunderland.
Mary	United Kingdom	The schooner was driven ashore and wrecked at Whitby. Her four crew were rescued by a coble. She was on a voyage from Sunderland to Woodbridge, Suffolk.
Mary Jane	United Kingdom	The ship was wrecked near Crawfordsburn, County Down. Her crew were rescued. She was on a voyage from Ardrossan, Ayrshire to Glasson Dock, Lancashire.
Messenger	United Kingdom	The ship ran aground at Stromness, Orkney Islands. She was on a voyage from Liverpool, Lancashire to Aberdeen.
Nettle	United Kingdom	The ship was driven ashore and wrecked at Douglas, Isle of Man. Her crew were rescued. She was on a voyage from Runcorn, Cheshire to Douglas.
Peamore	United Kingdom	The ship was driven ashore and wrecked at Seaton Carew, County Durham.
Phoenix	Hamburg	The barque was wrecked on the Long Sand, in the North Sea off the coast of Essex, United Kingdom. Her crew were rescued. She was on a voyage from Hamburg to Saint John's, Newfoundland, British North America.
Swans	United Kingdom	The brig was driven ashore at Sunderland. She was on a voyage from Altona to Sunderland.

== 21 March ==
List of shipwrecks: 21 March 1857
Ship	State	Description
Admiral Benbow	United Kingdom	The ship ran aground and was damaged at King's Lynn, Norfolk. She was on a voyage from Hartlepool, County Durham to King's Lynn. She was refloated and taken in to King's Lynn the next day.
Brothers	United Kingdom	The schooner was abandoned off the Longships Lighthouse. Her crew were rescued by Prince (United Kingdom). Brothers was on a voyage from Cardiff, Glamorgan to Plymouth, Devon.
Charlemagne	United Kingdom	The clipper ship was driven ashore and wrecked at Johnson's Point, on the Mull of Kintyre at the entrance to the Sound of Sanda. All on board were rescued. She was on hermaiden voyage, from Greenock, Renfrewshire to Melbourne, Victoria.
Churchill	United Kingdom	The schooner sprang a leak and was abandoned in Donegal Bay. Her crew were rescued by Earl of Errol (United Kingdom). Churchill was on a voyage from Newport, Monmouthshire to Ballyshannon, County Donegal.
Columbus	United Kingdom	The ship was driven ashore and wrecked at Hartlepool, County Durham. Her crew were rescued.
Cressinus	United Kingdom	The brig was wrecked at Middleton, County Durham. Her crew were rescued. She was on a voyage from Hartlepool, County Durham to London.
Harriet Stewart	United Kingdom	The ship was driven ashore and wrecked in Wigtown Bay. She was on a voyage from the Clyde to Sines, Portugal.
Hebrides	United Kingdom	The ship was driven ashore at Portland, Dorset.
Janet	United Kingdom	The sloop was driven ashore south of Donaghadee, County Down. She was on a voyage from Dumfries to East Tarbert, Wigtownshire She was a total loss.
Josephine	France	The brig was wrecked at Avola, Sicily. Her crew were rescued. She was on a voyage from Scala Nuova, Ottoman Empire to Seville, Spain.
Morgiana	United Kingdom	The brig ran aground and sank at Hartlepool. Her crew were rescued. She was on a voyage from Hartlepool to London.
Perseverance	United Kingdom	The ship was driven ashore and wrecked near Bangor, County Down. She was on a voyage from Troon, Ayrshire to Cork.
Pensylvania	United States	The ship was last sighted at the Salt Key on this date. Presumes subsequently sunk.
Snowdon Lassie	(United Kingdom of Great Britain and Ireland) Isle of Man	The schooner foundered off Kirk Michael. Her crew survived.
Unicorn	United Kingdom	The ship was driven ashore at Hartlepool.
Unicorn	(United Kingdom of Great Britain and Ireland) Jersey	The schooner ran aground at Hartlepool. She was refloated but consequently sank. Her crew were rescued.
Venus	United Kingdom	The schooner foundered in the North Sea off Bridlington, Yorkshire with the loss of all hands. She was on a voyage from Sandwich, Kent to Sunderland, County Durham. The wreck came ashore at Bridlington the next day.
Zes Gesusters	Netherlands	The barque was driven ashore at Sunderland. Her crew were rescued. She was on a voyage from Rotterdam, South Holland to Sunderland. She had become a wreck by 23 March.

== 22 March ==
List of shipwrecks: 22 March 1857
Ship	State	Description
Caroline	United Kingdom	The ship was driven ashore at Balbriggan, County Dublin. she was on a voyage from Liverpool, Lancashire to Newry, County Antrim.
Clorinda	United Kingdom	The barque ran aground at Hartlepool, County Durham. She was on a voyage from Aberdeen to Hartlepool. She was refloated and taken in to Hartlepool.
Concordia	United Kingdom	The ship was driven ashore and wrecked at Scarborough, Yorkshire. Her crew were rescued. She was on a voyage from Odense, Denmark to London.
Effort	United Kingdom	The schooner was driven ashore at Sunderland, County Durham.
Emily	United Kingdom	The schooner was run down and sunk by the steamship Sovereign (United Kingdom off Sheep Island, Pembrokeshire with the loss of three of her six crew. Survivors were rescued by Sovereign. Emily was on a voyage from Barrow-in-Furness, Lancashire to Newport, Monmouthshire.
Fancy	United Kingdom	The barque ran aground at Hartlepool. Her crew were rescued by the Hartlepool Lifeboat.
Guatemala	United Kingdom	The ship ran aground on the Leman Sand, in the English Channel. She was on a voyage from Newcastle upon Tyne, Northumberland to Málaga, Spain. She was refloated and put in to Plymouth, Devon in a leaky condition.
Heinrich Gerdes	Rostock	The schooner was driven ashore and wrecked at Spittal, Northumberland, United Kingdom. Her five crew were rescued by the Berwick upon Tweed Lifeboat. She was on a voyage from Rostock to Leith, Lothian. Heinrich Gerdes was refloated on 25 March and taken in to Berwick upon Tweed, Northumberland.
Janet	United Kingdom	The sloop was driven ashore near Donaghadee, County Down. She was on a voyage from Dumfries to East Tarbet, Wigtownshire.
Kate and Alice	United States	The ship ran aground on the Woolpack Sand, in the English Channel off the coast of Kent, United Kingdom and sank. Her crew were rescued by the lugger Lively (United Kingdom). Kate and Alice was on a voyage from Bremen to Havana, Cuba.
Margaretha	Kingdom of Hanover	The sloop was driven ashore and wrecked at the mouth of the River Tees with the loss of four of her five crew. The survivor was rescued by the South Shields Lifeboat. She was on a voyage from Carolinensiel to Hull, Yorkshire, United Kingdom.
Neptune	United Kingdom	The brig was driven ashore and wrecked at Middleton, County Durham. Her crew were rescued by the Hartlepool Lifeboat.
Perseverance	United Kingdom	The schooner was driven ashore and wrecked at Bangor, County Down. She was on a voyage from Troon, Ayrshire to Cork.
Rientje Willemina	Danzig	The ship was driven ashore at Rattray Head, Aberdeenshire, United Kingdom. She was on a voyage from Danzig to Leith, Lothian, United Kingdom.

== 23 March ==
List of shipwrecks: 23 March 1857
Ship	State	Description
Catherina Isabella	Netherlands	The full-rigged ship foundered at sea. Her crew were rescued by Mortier (France). Catherina Elizabeth was on a voyage from Antwerp, Belgium to San Sebastián, Spain.
Dinah	United Kingdom	The brig was wrecked at Souter Point, County Durham. Her crew survived.
Medina	United Kingdom	The ship was lost 4 nautical miles (7.4 km) off Sunderland, County Durham. Her crew were rescued.
Spring	United Kingdom	The barque was wrecked at Tynemouth, Northumberland. Her crew survived.
Velox	United Kingdom	The ship was driven ashore at New Grimsby, Isles of Scilly with the loss of her captain.

== 24 March ==
List of shipwrecks: 24 March 1857
Ship	State	Description
Bolina	United Kingdom	The brig ran aground and was damaged at Bangor, County Down. She was on a voyage from Liverpool, Lancashire to Limerick.
Felix	France	The ship foundered off Land's End, Cornwall, United Kingdom. She was on a voyage from Llanelly, Glamorgan, United Kingdom to Granville, Manche.
Spring	United Kingdom	The ship was driven ashore at Shoreham-by-Sea, Sussex. She was on a voyage from Hartlepool, County Durham to Shoreham-by-Sea. She was refloated on 23 March and taken in to Shoreham-by-Sea in a severely damaged condition.
Undine	Norway	The schooner ran aground on the Annat Sand, in the North Sea off the coast of Forfarshire, United Kingdom. Her crew were rescued. She was on a voyage from Ny-Hellesund to Ostend, West Flanders, Belgium. She had become a wreck by 27 March.
Ythan	United Kingdom	The schooner struck Wheaton Rock, in Sligo Bay. She was on a voyage from Montrose, Forfarshire to Sligo. She arrived at Sligo in a leaky condition.

== 25 March ==
List of shipwrecks: 25 March 1857
Ship	State	Description
Hebrides	United Kingdom	The ship ran aground near Portland Bill, Dorset. Her crew were rescued. She was on a voyage from Odesa to London.
J. G. Seume	(Denmark) Duchy of Schleswig	The galiot was holed by a stake at Hamburg. She was on a voyage from Elmshoren to Rye, Sussex, United Kingdom.
Magnet	United Kingdom	The ship ran aground at Birkenhead, Cheshire. She was on a voyage from Birkenhead to Bombay, India. She was refloated and taken in to Liverpool, Lancashire.
Sarah	United Kingdom	The ship ran aground and sank 1 nautical mile (1.9 km) east of Hartland Point, Devon. Her crew survived. She was on a voyage from Neath, Glamorgan to Portreath, Cornwall.

== 26 March ==
List of shipwrecks: 26 March 1857
Ship	State	Description
Jane	United Kingdom	The brig was wrecked at the La Coubre Lighthouse, Charente-Inférieure, France. Her crew were rescued.
Waterwitch	United Kingdom	The ship was lost in the Gulf of Gouyaraken. Her crew were rescued. She was on a voyage from Dublin to Scalloway, Shetland Islands.
Zollverein	Kingdom of Prussia	The brig was wrecked at the Point de la Courbe, near La Tremblade, Charente-Inférieure, France. She was on a voyage from Liverpool, Lancashire, United Kingdom to Bordeaux, Gironde, France.

== 27 March ==
List of shipwrecks: 27 March 1857
Ship	State	Description
Cheerful	United Kingdom	The schooner was wrecked at the Cabo Mayor Lighthouse, Santander, Spain with the loss of a crew member. She was on a voyage from Dunkirk, Nord, France to Santander.
Ellen Noyes	United States	The ship was lost in the Bangka Strait. Her crew were rescued by the barque Charlotte (Sweden). Ellen Noyes was on a voyage from Boston, Massachusetts to Singapore, Straits Settlements.

== 28 March ==
List of shipwrecks: 28 March 1857
Ship	State	Description
Arcadia	United Kingdom	The steamship ran aground near St. James's Castle. Smyrna, Ottoman Empire. She was refloated on 4 April.
Bacchante	United Kingdom	The steamship struck the Filgueira Rock and was then wrecked on the Forcado Rocks, off the coast of Portugal. All on board were rescued. She was on a voyage from London to Porto, Portugal.
Brothers	United Kingdom	The ship ran aground on the Spur of Murkle, Caithness and was severely damaged. She was on a voyage from Scrabster, Caithness to Leith, Lothian.
Coquette	United Kingdom	The schooner departed from Lerwick, Shetland Islands for the Faroe Islands and Iceland. No further trace, presumed foundered with the loss of all hands.
Endeavour	United Kingdom	The ship sprang a leak and was abandoned in Cardigan Bay. Her crew were rescued.
Oracle	United Kingdom	The ship was driven ashore at Pulteneytown, Caithness and was damaged. She was refloated and taken in to Pulteneytown.
Trevaunance	United Kingdom	The schooner was wrecked at Sker Point, Glamorgan with the loss of one of her four crew. She was on a voyage from St. Agnes, Cornwall to Swansea, Glamorgan.

== 29 March ==
List of shipwrecks: 29 March 1857
Ship	State	Description
Amelia	United Kingdom	The steamship struck a sunken rock and sank off St. Govan's Head, Pembrokeshire. All 35 people on board survived. She was on a voyage from Bristol, Gloucestershire to Liverpool, Lancashire.
Arwenwick	United Kingdom	The ship was driven ashore at Swansea, Glamorgan.
Durham	United Kingdom	The collier was driven onto the Middle Ground, in the North Sea off the coast of County Durham and was damaged. She was refloated.
Edgar Atheling	United Kingdom	The ship was driven ashore at South Shields, County Durham. She was refloated.
Emperor	United Kingdom	The barque was wrecked on the Glasgorman Bank, in the Irish Sea off the coast of County Dublin. All on board were rescued. She was on a voyage from Liverpool to Bahia, Brazil.
Flying Fish	United Kingdom	The smack was wrecked west of Dundrum, County Down. Her crew were rescued. She was on a voyage from Plymouth, Devon to Belfast, County Antrim.
Ocean	Norway	The barque was driven onto the Herd Sand, in the North Sea off the coast of County Durham.
Rainbow	United Kingdom	The paddle tug was driven ashore at South Shields. She was refloated.
Thomas Fielding	United Kingdom	The ship was driven ashore at South Shields. She was refloated.
Trevaunce	United Kingdom	The schooner foundered off Porthcawl, Glamorgan, Wales, with the loss of one of her four crew.
Wandering Shepherd	United Kingdom	The ship was driven onto the Herd Sand.
Wolga	United Kingdom	The barque was driven ashore between Roquetas de Mar and Adra, Spain. Her crew were rescued. She was on a voyage from Hull, Yorkshire to Adra.

== 30 March ==
List of shipwrecks: 30 March 1857
Ship	State	Description
Happy Return	United Kingdom	The ship was in collision with Sabina ( Grand Duchy of Mecklenburg-Schwerin) and was abandoned in the North Sea. All but one of her crew were taken off by Sabina. Happy Return was on a voyage from Portsoy, Aberdeenshire to Sunderland, County Durham. She was towed in to Dundee, Forfarshire the next day by the steamship Queen (United Kingdom) with the remaining crew member on board.
Jane Langdale	United Kingdom	The ship was driven ashore at Dundee.
Recovery	United Kingdom	The ship was driven ashore at Flamborough Head, Yorkshire. She was on a voyage from Hull, Yorkshire to South Shields, County Durham. She had been refloated by 11 April and was towed in to South Shields by the tugboatugs Bests and Powerful (both United Kingdom).
Rose	United Kingdom	The schooner ran aground on the Winterton Ridge, in the North Sea off the coast of Norfolk. She was on a voyage from London to Danzig. She was refloated and put in to Grimsby, Lincolnshire in a leaky condition. She arrived on 2 April.
Therese	Norway	The barque ran aground on the Kentish Knock. She was on a voyage from Bergen to Nantes, Loire-Inférieure, France. She was refloated and taken in to Ramsgate, Kent, United Kingdom in a leaky condition.

== 31 March ==
List of shipwrecks: 31 March 1857
Ship	State	Description
Heldine Annette	Duchy of Holstein	The derelict ship came ashore at Rattray Head, Aberdeenshire, United Kingdom.
Jane Langdale	United Kingdom	The ship was driven ashore and wrecked at the mouth of the River Tay. She was on a voyage from London to Invergordon, Ross-shire.
Lady Ebrington	United Kingdom	The ship ran aground on the Blackwater Bank, in the Irish Sea off the coast of Lancashire. She was on a voyage from Liverpool, Lancashire to Valparaíso, Chile. She was refloated and put back to Liverpool.
Mary Ann Peters	United Kingdom	The ship ran aground and was severely damaged at Rownham Ferry, Gloucestershire with the loss of one life, either at the time of grounding or subsequently. She was on a voyage from Bristol, Gloucestershire to Africa.
Mayflower	United Kingdom	The smack was driven ashore at St Germans, Cornwall.
Queen of the Ocean	United Kingdom	The barque was beached at Almería, Spain. She was on a voyage from Messina, Sicily to Hull, Yorkshire.
Sportsman	United Kingdom	The ship ran aground on the Ridge Sand. She was on a voyage from Middlesbrough, Yorkshire to Rouen, Seine-Inférieure, France. She was refloated and put in to Ramsgae, Kent in a leaky condition.
Willis	Sweden	The ship ran aground and capsized at South Shiels, County Durham, United Kingdom.

== Unknown date ==
List of shipwrecks: Unknown date in March 1857
Ship	State	Description
Balmier	France	The full-rigged ship was wrecked at Lagos, Africa.
British Monarch	United Kingdom	The ship was abandoned in the Atlantic Ocean. Her crew were rescued. She was on a voyage from Savannah, Georgia, United States to Cardiff, Glamorgan.
Cathedral	United States	The full-rigged ship foundered in the Pacific Ocean. Her crew were rescued by Anna Pitcairn (United Kingdom).
Challenger	United Kingdom	The barque struck a rock and sank in the Chusan Islands before 7 March. Her crew were rescued. She was on a voyage from Amoy, China to Singapore, Straits Settlements.
Haberdine	United Kingdom	The schooner was driven ashore and wrecked near Padstow, Cornwall.
Helena	Netherlands	The ship foundered in the North Sea with the loss of at least five lives.
Hero	United Kingdom	The full-rigged ship was driven ashore at Crosby Point, Lancashire before 15 March. She was refloated on 25 March and towed in to Liverpool, Lancashire in a severely damaged condition.
Henry Brigham	United States	The extreme clipper was driven ashore at Tybee, Georgia before 18 March. She was later refloated.
Hildina Annette	Duchy of Holstein	The ship was abandoned in the North Sea before 27 March. She drove ashore at Rattray Head, Aberdeenshire, United Kingdom on 31 March.
Hunter	United Kingdom	The brig was abandoned in the North Sea off Texel, North Holland, Netherlands before 11 March. She was on a voyage from West Hartlepool, County Durham to Hamburg.
Jane	United Kingdom	The ship was driven ashore at Holyhead, Anglesey. She was refloated on 14 March.
Jason	United Kingdom	The ship was driven ashore near Portpatrick, Wigtownshire. SHe was on a voyage from the Clyde to Melbourne, Victoria.
Jessie McLelland	United Kingdom	The ship was driven ashore on the Isle of Arran, Inner Hebrides. She was on a voyage from Dunfanaghy, County Donegal to Liverpool. She was refloated and towed in to Ayr in a severely damaged condition.
Mary Houghton	United Kingdom	The ship sank in the Irish Sea off the Isle of Man. She was on a voyage from Liverpool to Havre de Grâce, Seine-Inférieure, France. She was refloated on 26 June and taken in to Peel, Isle of Man.
Melbourne	United Kingdom	The ship was driven ashore at Southport, Lancashire before 17 March.
Penningham	United Kingdom	The barque was driven ashore at Crosby Point before 15 March.
Pursuit	United Kingdom	The ship was driven ashore near Hornbeck. She was on a voyage from London to Memel, Prussia.
Ranavala	(United Kingdom of Great Britain and Ireland) Jersey	The ship was abandoned in the Atlantic Ocean. Her crew were rescued by Plamtin (United Kingdom).
Sarah Birkett	United Kingdom	The brig sprang a leak and was abandoned off the mouth of the Courantyne River before 12 March. Her crew survived.
Spring	United Kingdom	The ship was driven ashore at Shoreham-by-Sea, Sussex. She was refloated and taken in to Shoreham-by-Sea in a severely damaged condition.
St. George	United Kingdom	The ship was driven ashore on Fernando Po, Equatorial Guinea. She had been refloated by 13 March.
Sumatra	United Kingdom	The ship ran aground on the Great Basses Reef, off the coast of Ceylon and was abandoned. All on board were rescued. She was on a voyage from London to Colombo, Ceylon.
