= Admiral Douglas =

Admiral Douglas may refer to:

- Archibald Douglas, 5th Earl of Angus (c. 1449–1513), Lord High Admiral of Scotland
- Archibald Lucius Douglas (1842–1913), British Royal Navy admiral
- Sir Charles Douglas, 1st Baronet (1727–1789), British Royal Navy rear admiral
- Sir James Douglas, 1st Baronet (1703–1787), British Royal Navy admiral
- James Douglas, 4th Earl of Morton (c. 1516–1581), Lord High Admiral of Scotland
- John Erskine Douglas (c. 1758–1847), British Royal Navy admiral
- Percy Douglas (1876–1939), British Royal Navy vice admiral
- Peter John Douglas (1787–1858), British Royal Navy rear admiral
- Robert Douglas (Royal Navy officer) (1829–1910), British Royal Navy admiral

== See also ==
- Cyril Douglas-Pennant (1894–1961), British Royal Navy admiral
