= Admiral Campbell =

Admiral Campbell may refer to:

- Alexander Campbell (Royal Navy officer) (1874–1957), British Royal Navy vice admiral
- Donald Campbell (Royal Navy officer) (1788–1856), British Royal Navy rear admiral
- Edward Hale Campbell (1872–1946), U.S. Navy vice admiral
- George Campbell (Royal Navy officer) (1759–1821), British Royal Navy admiral
- Gordon Campbell (Royal Navy officer) (1898–1980), British Royal Navy vice admiral
- Ian Campbell (Royal Navy officer) (1898–1980), British Royal Navy vice admiral
- John Campbell (Royal Navy officer) (1720–1790), British Royal Navy vice admiral
- Patrick Campbell (Royal Navy officer) (1773–1841), British Royal Navy vice admiral

== See also ==
- Keith McNeil Campbell-Walter (1904–1976), British Royal Navy rear admiral
