= Carl Fischer (homeopath) =

Doctor, homoeopath, viticulturalist (died 1893)

Carl Frank Fischer
- Born: Carl Frank Fischer; Austria
- Died: 23 June 1893
- Education: Martin Luther University Halle-Wittenberg
- Occupations: doctor; homoeopath; viticulturist

Carl Frank Fischer (year of birth unknown – 23 June 1893) was a New Zealand doctor, homoeopath and viticulturist.

== Biography ==
Fischer was born in Austria, and received a medical degree from the Martin Luther University Halle-Wittenberg in Germany. He migrated to New Zealand in the early 1850s.

Fischer established his successful practice in Auckland after saving Jane Graham, wife of prominent politician George Graham, who was buried after a store collapsed.

Between 1855 and 1856 he published 12 issues of the Homeopathic Echo, the first medical journal in New Zealand. In 1857 he founded the Homeopathic Association.

In 1858 after the arrival of the Novara, Fischer became close friends with geologists Ferdinand Hochstetter and Julius Haast.

In 1869 Fischer moved to Sydney with his family, and by 1877 the family had gone to live in Europe. After the death of his wife Prudence, Fischer returned to Sydney. He was awarded the Great Gold Medal of Science and Art by the Emperor of Austria for services to natural history and medicine. His daughter married Commander Burges Watson of the Royal Navy, after which she lived in China where her husband had been permanently posted.

Fischer died in 1893 in Chicago where he went to attend a medical congress and exposition and present a paper on the 'Progress of Homeopathy in New South Wales.

== Personal life ==
Fischer married Prudence Florentine De Lattre, and together they had a daughter, Maria Theresa, who was born in Auckland. Fischer lived in Takapuna, on the shores of Lake Pupuke, and was a prominent Auckland socialite. Maria Theresa (also known as Marie Thérèse Fisher) married Commander Burges Watson in 1882. The couples' eldest son, Fischer Watson, born in 1884, later became a Royal Navy officer who served as Commander-in-Chief of the New Zealand Division.
