= Ernest Simons (Royal Navy officer) =

Royal Navy Admiral; Admiral Superintendent of Malta Dockyard (1856–1928)

Admiral Ernest Simons
- Born: 3 September 1856; Lucknow, India
- Died: 30 August 1928 (aged 71)
- Military career
- Allegiance: United Kingdom
- Branch: Royal Navy
- Rank: Admiral
- Commands: HMS Illustrious; HMS Formidable; Malta Dockyard

Admiral Ernest Alfred Simons (3 September 1856 – 30 August 1928) was a Royal Navy officer who became Admiral Superintendent of Malta Dockyard.

== Naval career ==
Promoted to captain on 31 December 1896, Simons became Director of Naval Ordnance on 10 May 1898. In September 1902 he was posted to HMS President for study at the Royal Naval College. He was commanding officer of the battleship HMS Illustrious in July 1903 and commanding officer of the battleship HMS Formidable in March 1906. Promoted to rear admiral on 1 January 1907, he became Admiral Superintendent of Malta Dockyard in January 1910. He was promoted to vice admiral on 27 August 1911 and to full admiral on 24 October 1914.

Military offices
| Preceded by Frederic Fisher | Admiral Superintendent, Malta Dockyard; 1910–1912 | Succeeded by Sackville Carden |
