= Tracey Mission =

The Tracey Mission was a Naval mission of the Royal Navy sent to Japan in 1867–1868. Taking place immediately prior to the Meiji Restoration of 1868, the mission had been requested by the Shogunate in order to help develop its Navy, and more specifically to organize and superintend the Naval school at Tsukiji, Tokyo.

The mission was led by Commander, later Admiral, Sir Richard Tracey, and composed of several officers and warrant officers. Commander Tracey, who earlier in his career had served as a junior officer on HMS Euryalus, was a veteran of active operations at both the Bombardment of Kagoshima in August 1863 and the Shimonoseki campaign in September 1864.

The Tracey mission was barely able to start work due to the start of the Boshin War and returned to England, due to the promise of all foreign powers to remain neutral in the conflict.
