= Palumbo Shipyards =

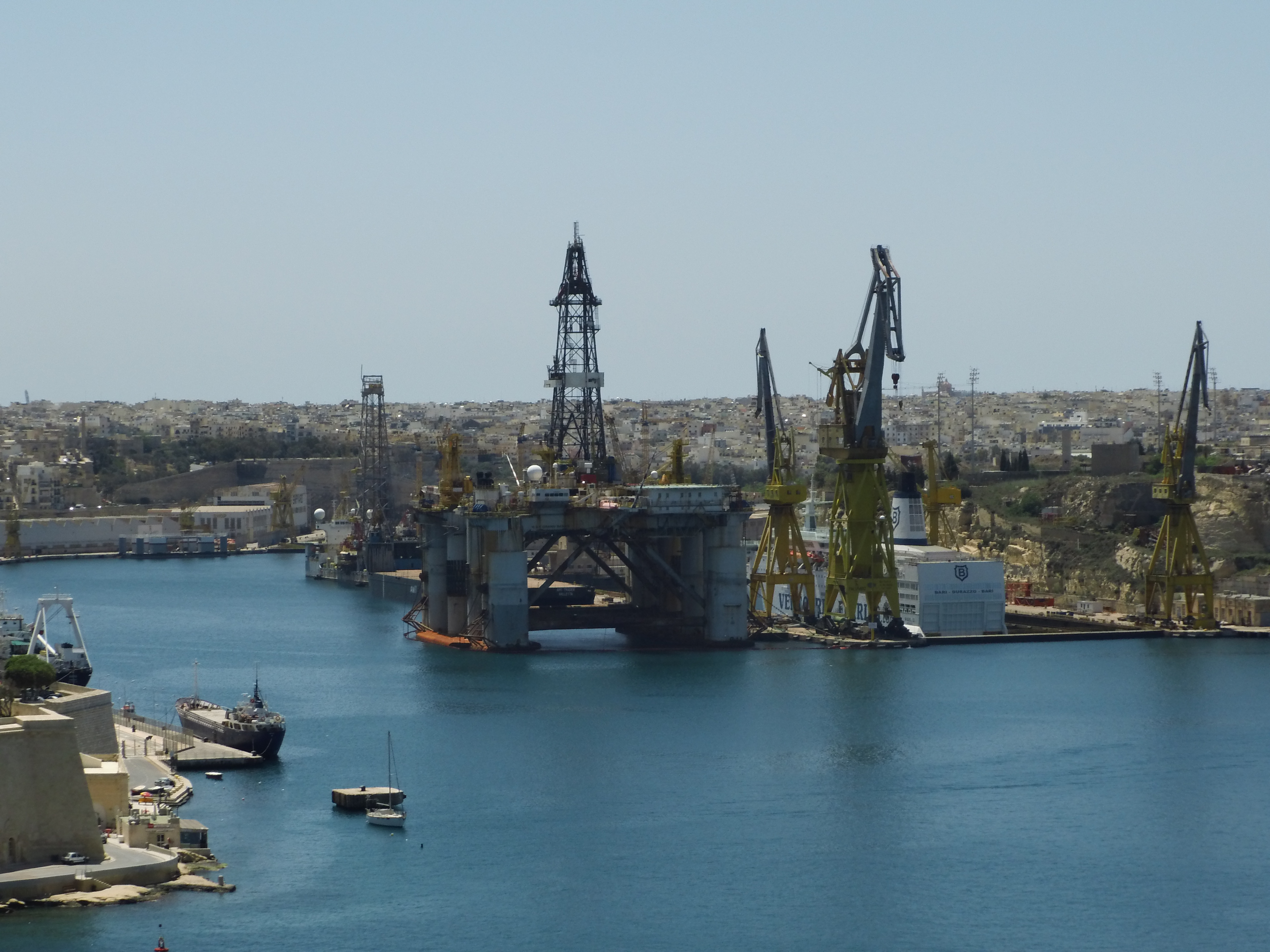
Palumbo Shipyards in Malta

Palumbo is an international shipyard group headquartered in Naples with seven shipyards across the Mediterranean (Ancona, Naples, Malta, Savona, Messina, Rijeka and Marseille) operating five brands: ISA Yachts, Columbus Yachts, Mondomarine, Extra Yachts and Palumbo SY dedicated to refit.

In 2011 they launched the largest yacht ever built in Southern Italy.

In 2011, Palumbo improved its presence in Malta by signing a 30-year deal for the operation of Malta Super Yacht Services (MSYS) with the government. In 2020, MSC took over 50 percent of the company.

== See also ==
- Azimut Yachts
- Benetti
- Fincantieri
