= Malta Dockyard =

Naval base in the Mediterranean

Coordinates: 35.879°N 14.516°E

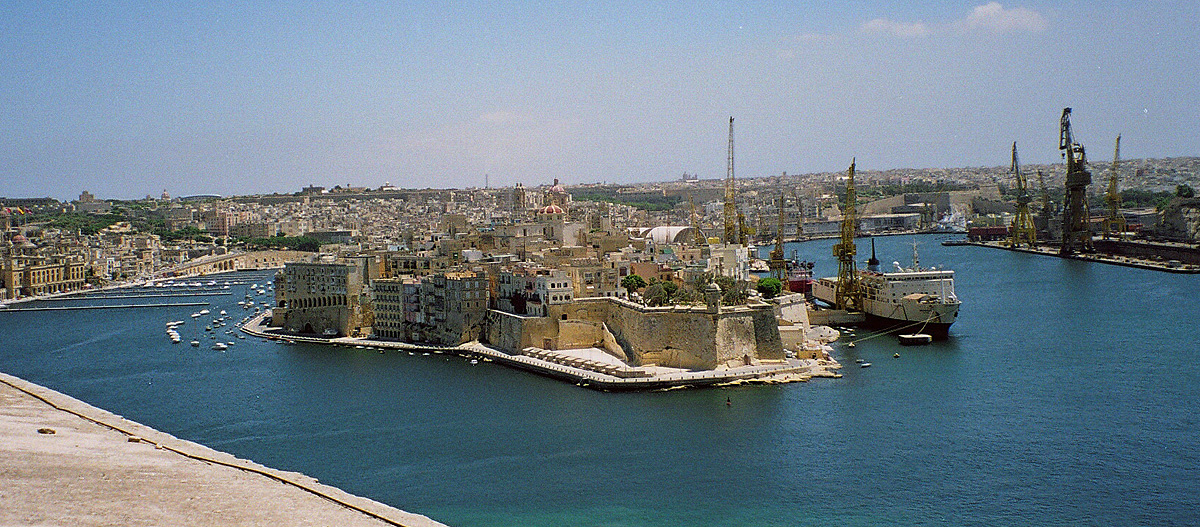
Valletta Harbour: Dockyard Creek (left) and French Creek (right) with the fortified city of Senglea between the two

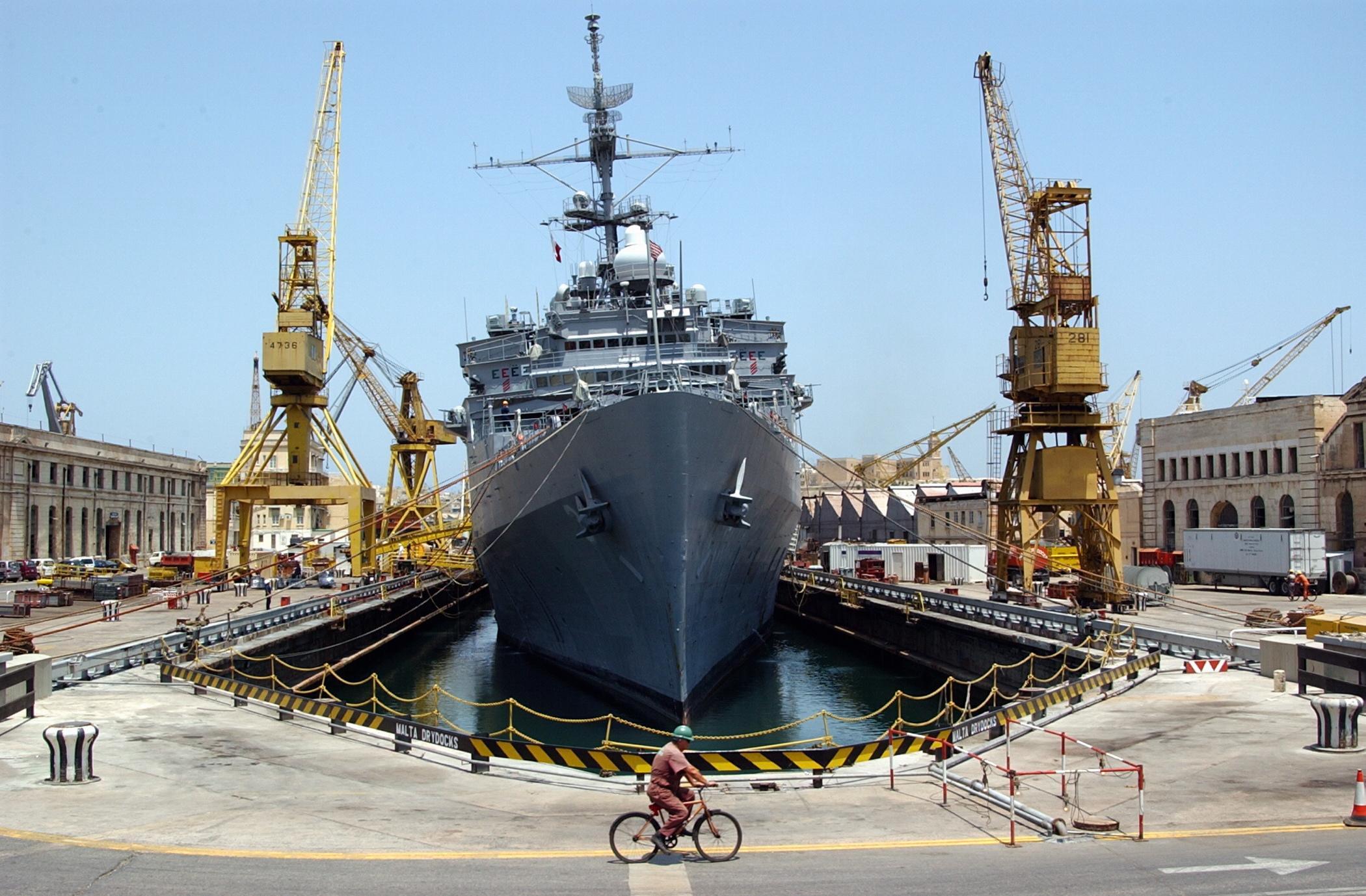
A Maltese shipyard worker heads home on his bicycle after a day's work on USS La Salle in Cospicua.

Malta Dockyard was an important naval base in the Grand Harbour in Malta in the Mediterranean Sea. The shipyard infrastructure is still in operation and is now operated by Palumbo Shipyards.

== History ==
=== Pre-1800 ===
The Knights of Malta established dockyard facilities within the Grand Harbour to maintain their fleet of galleys. These were spread between the cities of Senglea, Cospicua and Vittoriosa.

=== 19th century ===
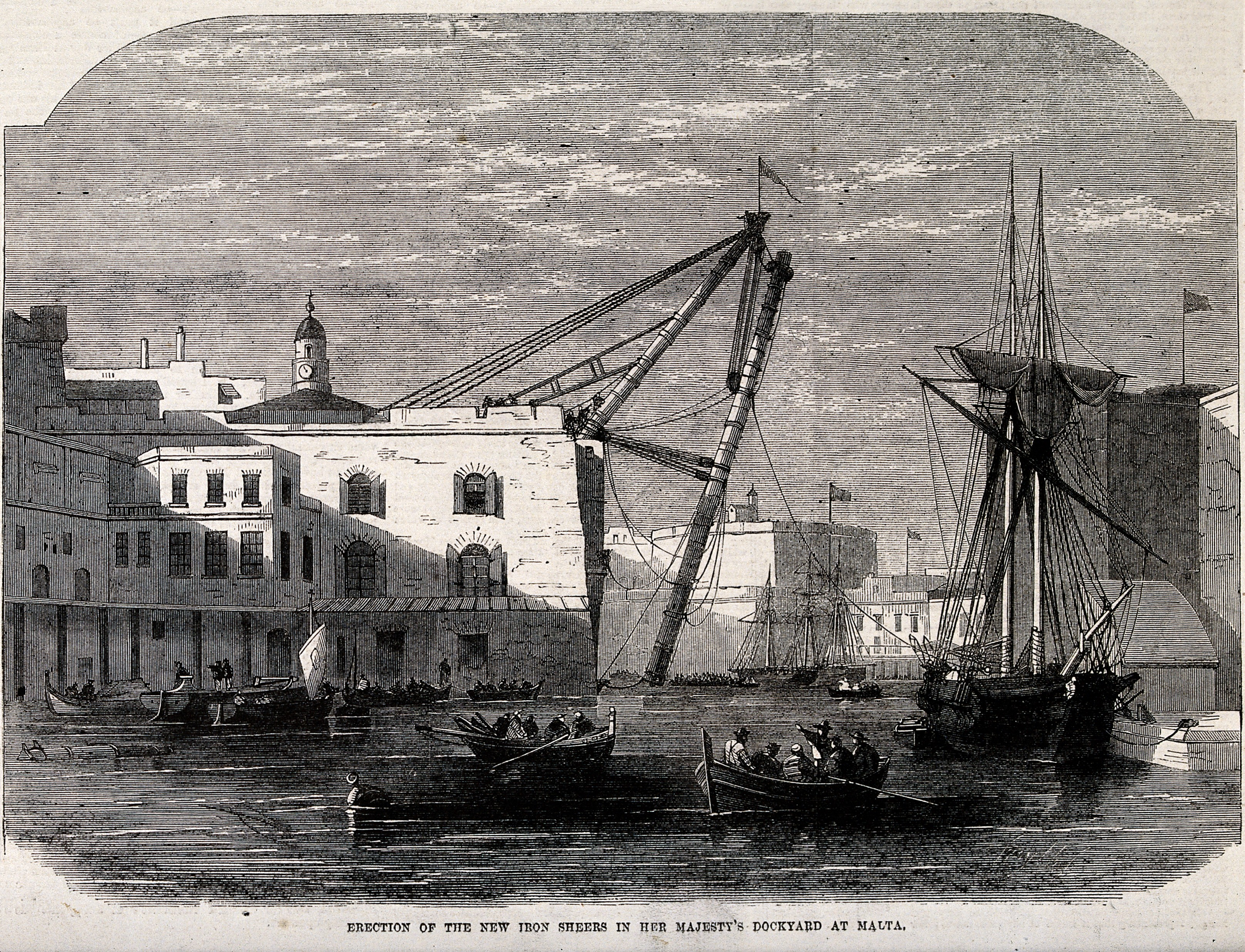
HM Dockyard, Malta, 1865: new iron sheers in use

When Malta became a British protectorate in 1800, these facilities were inherited, and gradually consolidated, by the Royal Navy. With the loss of Menorca, Malta swiftly became the Navy's principal Mediterranean base.

The Royal Navy Dockyard was initially located around Dockyard Creek in Bormla, and occupied several of the dockyard buildings formerly used by the Knights of Malta. By 1850 the facilities included storehouses, a ropery, a small steam factory, victualling facilities, houses for the officers of the Yard, and most notably a dry dock – the first to be provided for a Royal Dockyard outside Britain. Begun in 1844, the dry dock was opened in 1847; ten years later it was extended to form a double dock (No. 1 and No. 2 dock).

In the second half of the century the steam factory with its machine shops and foundries was expanded. Very soon, though, it was clear that more space was required than the crowded wharves of Dockyard Creek afforded, to accommodate the increasing size of ships and the increasing size of the fleet based there. The decision was taken to expand into the adjacent French Creek, and between 1861 and 1909 a further five dry docks—three single plus one double dock—were constructed there, along with an assortment of specialized buildings to serve the mechanized Navy.

=== 20th century ===
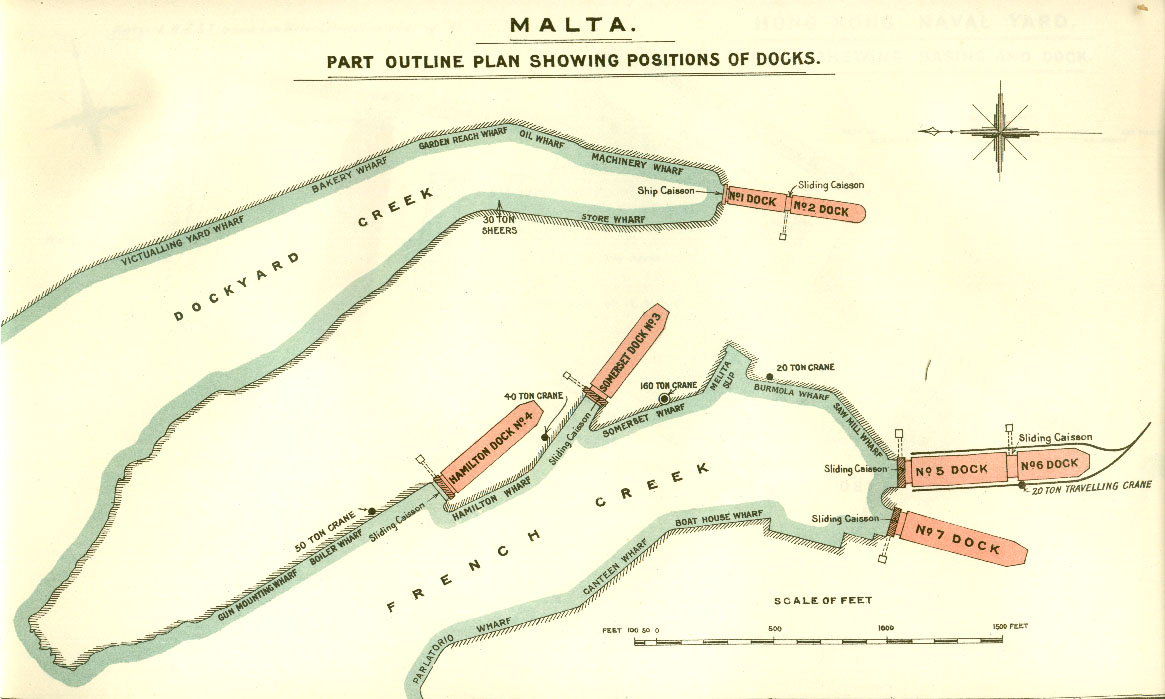
1909 map of the Malta docks 1, 2, 5, 6 & 7 within Bormla and docks 3 & 4 flanking Senglea.

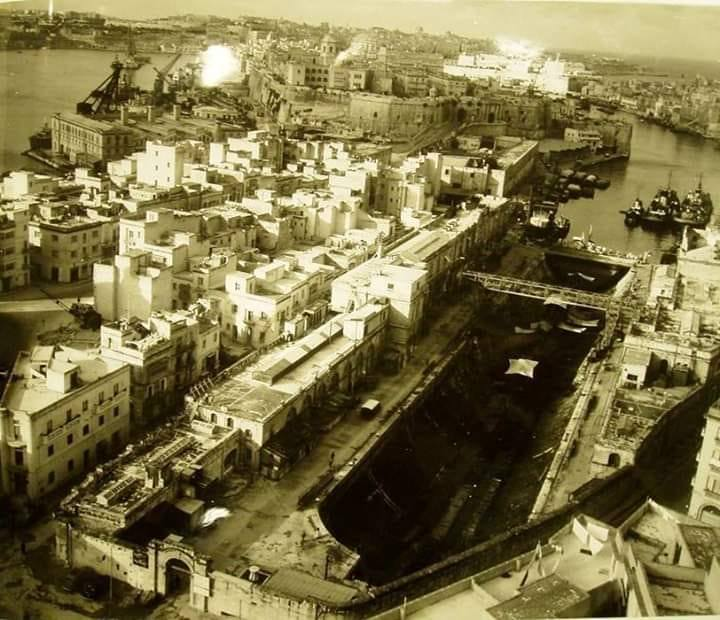
Docks No. 1 and 2 (Hamilton Dock) in Bormla.

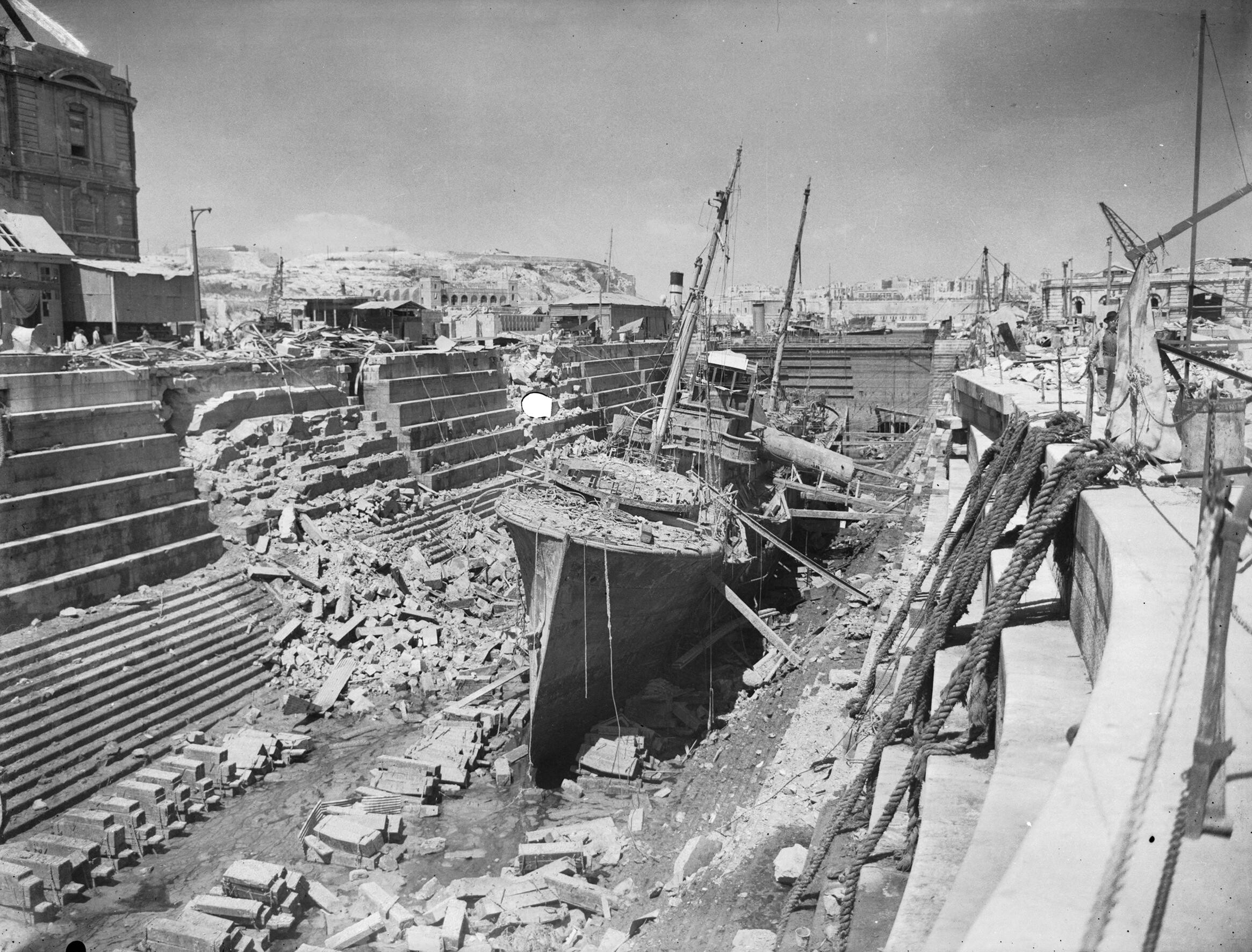
The armed trawler HMS Coral within a bomb-damaged Dry Dock No 3 (Somerset Dock) during World War II

It was an important supply base during the First World War and the Second World War. In January 1941 sixty German dive bombers made a massed attack on the dockyard in an attempt to destroy the damaged British aircraft carrier Illustrious, but she received only one bomb hit. Incessant German and Italian bombing raids targeted Malta through March, opposed by only a handful of British fighters. Then in April 1942 the Admiral Superintendent of Malta Dockyard reported that due to German air attacks on Malta's naval base "practically no workshops were in action other than those underground; all docks were damaged; electric power, light and telephones were largely out of action."

The dockyard was handed over to Messrs C.H. Bailey of South Wales, a civilian firm of ship repairers and marine engineers, on the morning of 30 March 1959. At a ceremony the previous day in the Red State Room of the Grandmaster's Palace, Valletta, before Navy and civilian officials, the Fourth Sea Lord had handed over a ceremonial key to the Governor of Malta, who had then passed it to the chairman of Bailey. At the time it was intended that "the yard would continue to be supplied with naval repair work, which would diminish as commercial activities expanded." Supervision of residual naval work in the dockyard would be carried out by personnel under the direction of the Flag Officer Malta.

After Baileys were dispossessed by the Maltese Government, by February 1968, the dockyard was closed as a naval base and the Royal Navy withdrew completely in 1979. It was then managed by a workers' council between 1979 and 1996 repairing civilian ships.

=== 21st century ===
In 2010, Malta Shipyards Ltd was placed into liquidation and its assets were given over to Palumbo Shipyards. In the course of its government ownership, the dockyard had accumulated €1bn in losses. In 2011, Palumbo acquired on a 30-year lease the neighbouring "superyacht" facility, which includes a drydock with a retractable roof.

== Administration of Malta Dockyard ==
The dockyard was initially managed by a Resident Commissioner of the Navy Board from 1791 until 1832 when all Resident Commissioners at dockyards were replaced by Superintendents. Admirals Superintendent included:

=== Resident commissioners ===
Post holders included:

- 1791– 1793 Captain Harry Harmood (co-held title at Gibraltar)
- 1793–1796 Captain Andrew Sutherland (co-held title at Gibraltar)
- 1801–1803 Captain John Nicholson Inglefield (co-held title at Gibraltar)
- 1803–1805 Captain Sir Alexander Ball (co-held title at Gibraltar)
- 1805–1807 Captain William Brown
- 1808–1811 Captain William Lobb
- 1811–1812 Captain Percy Fraser
- 1812–1829 Captain Joseph Larcom
- 1829–1832 Thomas Briggs (Admiral Superintendent to 1838)

=== Admiral superintendents ===
- 1832–1838 Rear Admiral Thomas Briggs
- 1838–1843 Rear Admiral John Louis
- 1843–1848 Rear Admiral Lucius Curtis
- 1848–1853 Rear Admiral Edward Harvey
- 1853–1855 Rear Admiral Houston Stewart
- 1855–1858 Rear Admiral Montagu Stopford
- 1858–1863 Rear Admiral Henry Codrington
- 1863–1864 Rear Admiral Horatio Austin
- 1864–1868 Rear Admiral Henry Kellett
- 1868–1870 Rear Admiral Edward Fanshawe
- 1870–1872 Rear Admiral Astley Key
- 1872–1876 Rear Admiral Edward Inglefield
- 1876–1878 Rear Admiral Edward Rice
- 1878–1879 Rear Admiral William Luard
- 1879–1882 Rear Admiral John McCrea
- 1882–1885 Rear Admiral William Graham
- 1885–1887 Rear Admiral William Ward
- 1887–1889 Rear Admiral Robert Douglas
- 1889–1892 Rear Admiral Alexander Buller
- 1892–1894 Rear Admiral Richard Tracey
- 1894–1897 Rear Admiral Richard Duckworth-King
- 1897–1900 Rear Admiral Rodney Lloyd
- 1900–1902 Rear Admiral Burges Watson
- 1902–1905 Rear Admiral James Hammet
- 1905–1907 Rear Admiral Arthur Bromley
- 1907–1910 Rear Admiral Frederic Fisher
- 1910–1912 Rear Admiral Ernest Simons
- 1912–1914 Rear Admiral Sackville Carden
- 1914–1916 Rear Admiral Arthur Limpus
- 1916–1918 Rear-Admiral George Ballard
- 1918–1921 Rear Admiral Brian Barttelot
- 1921–1924 Rear Admiral John Luce (Rear-Admiral in Charge, Malta, and Admiral Superintendent, Malta Dockyard)
- 1924–1926 Rear Admiral Charles Johnson (Rear-Admiral in Charge, Malta, and Admiral Superintendent, Malta Dockyard)
- 1926–1928 Rear Admiral Alexander Campbell (Rear-Admiral in Charge, Malta, and Admiral Superintendent, Malta Dockyard)
- 1928–1931 Rear Admiral Francis Mitchell (Rear-Admiral in Charge, Malta, and Admiral Superintendent, Malta Dockyard)
- 1931–1934 Rear Admiral Matthew Best (Rear-Admiral in Charge, Malta, and Admiral Superintendent, Malta Dockyard)
- 1934–1937 Vice Admiral Sir Wilfred French (Rear-Admiral (later Vice-Admiral) in Charge, Malta, and Admiral Superintendent, Malta Dockyard)
- 1937–1941 Vice Admiral Sir Wilbraham Ford (Vice-Admiral in Charge, Malta, and Admiral Superintendent, Malta Dockyard)

From 1941-1945 the post of Superintendent, H.M. Dockyard was separated from that of Flag Officer-in-Charge, Malta

- 1941-1943 Rear Admiral (ret.) K. H. L. Mackenzie (Naval Superintendent, Malta Dockyard)
- 1943-1945 Rear Admiral (ret.) P. K. Kekewich (Naval Superintendent, Malta Dockyard)

=== Flag Officer-in-Charge, Malta ===
- 1941–1942 Vice Admiral Sir Ralph Leatham
- 1942–1943 Vice Admiral Sir Stuart Bonham Carter
- May–Oct 1943 Vice Admiral Arthur Power

=== Vice Admiral, Malta and Flag Officer, Central Mediterranean ===
- 1943–1945 Vice Admiral Sir Louis Hamilton
- 1945–1946 Vice Admiral Sir Frederick Dalrymple-Hamilton

=== Flag Officer, Malta ===
- 1946–1948 Rear Admiral Marcel Kelsey
- 1948–1950 Rear Admiral Philip Clarke
- 1950–1952 Vice Admiral Sir Geoffrey Hawkins
- 1952–1954 Rear Admiral Jocelyn Salter
- 1954–1957 Rear Admiral Wilfred Brittain
- 1957–1959 Vice Admiral Sir Charles Madden, 2nd Baronet
- 1959–1961 Rear Admiral Derick Hetherington
- 1961–1963 Rear Admiral David Boyle, Viscount Kelburn

Note: The post was vacant between 1963 and 1967

- 1967–1969 Rear Admiral Dudley Davenport
- 1969–1971 Rear Admiral Derrick Kent
- 1971–1973 Rear Admiral John Templeton-Cotill
- 1973–1975 Rear Admiral David Loram
- 1975–1979 Rear Admiral Sir Nigel Cecil

== Gallery ==
Former Naval Dockyard buildings
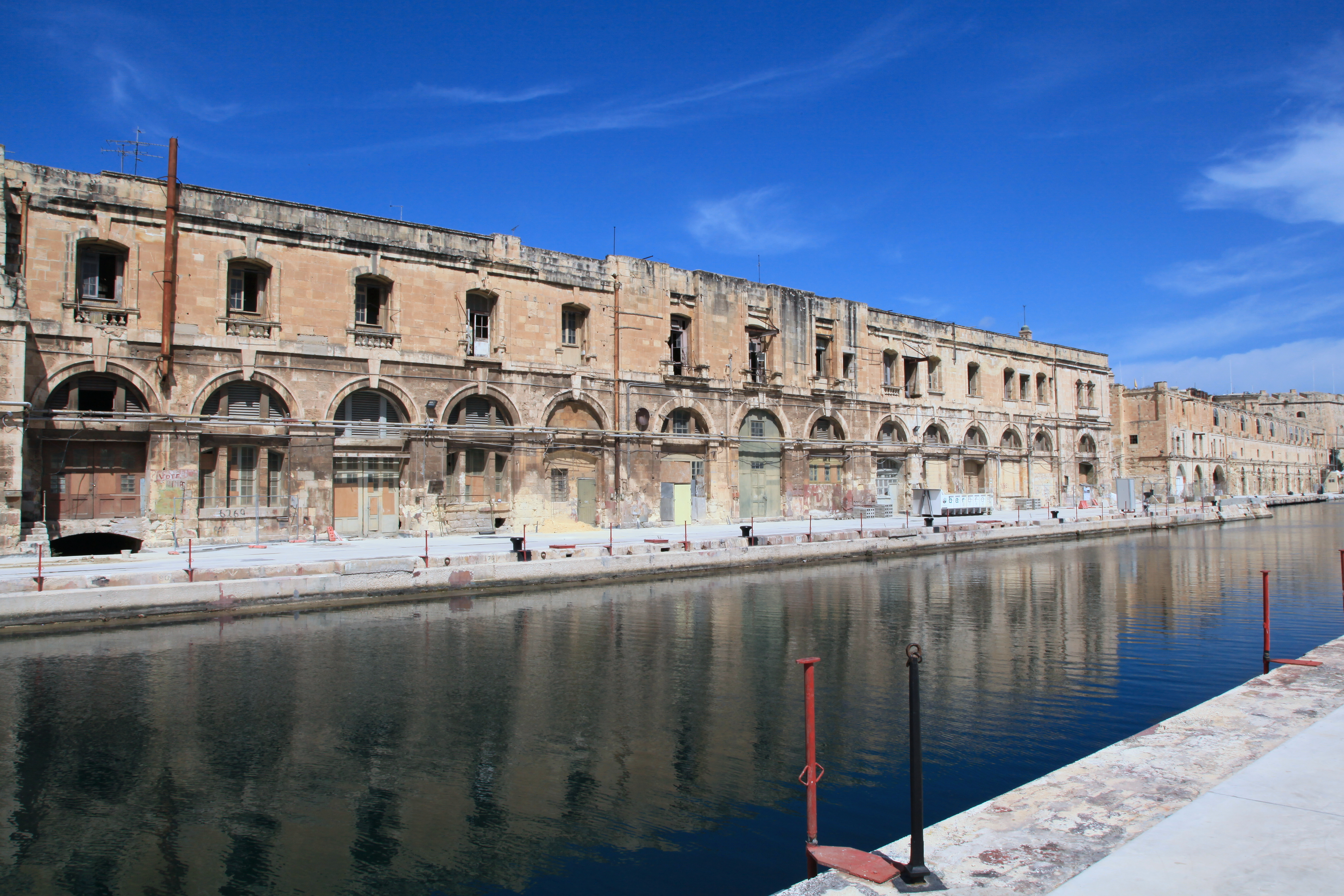
Factory building (1863) alongside No. 1 & 2 dock (Galley Storehouse and Sheer Bastion lie beyond).

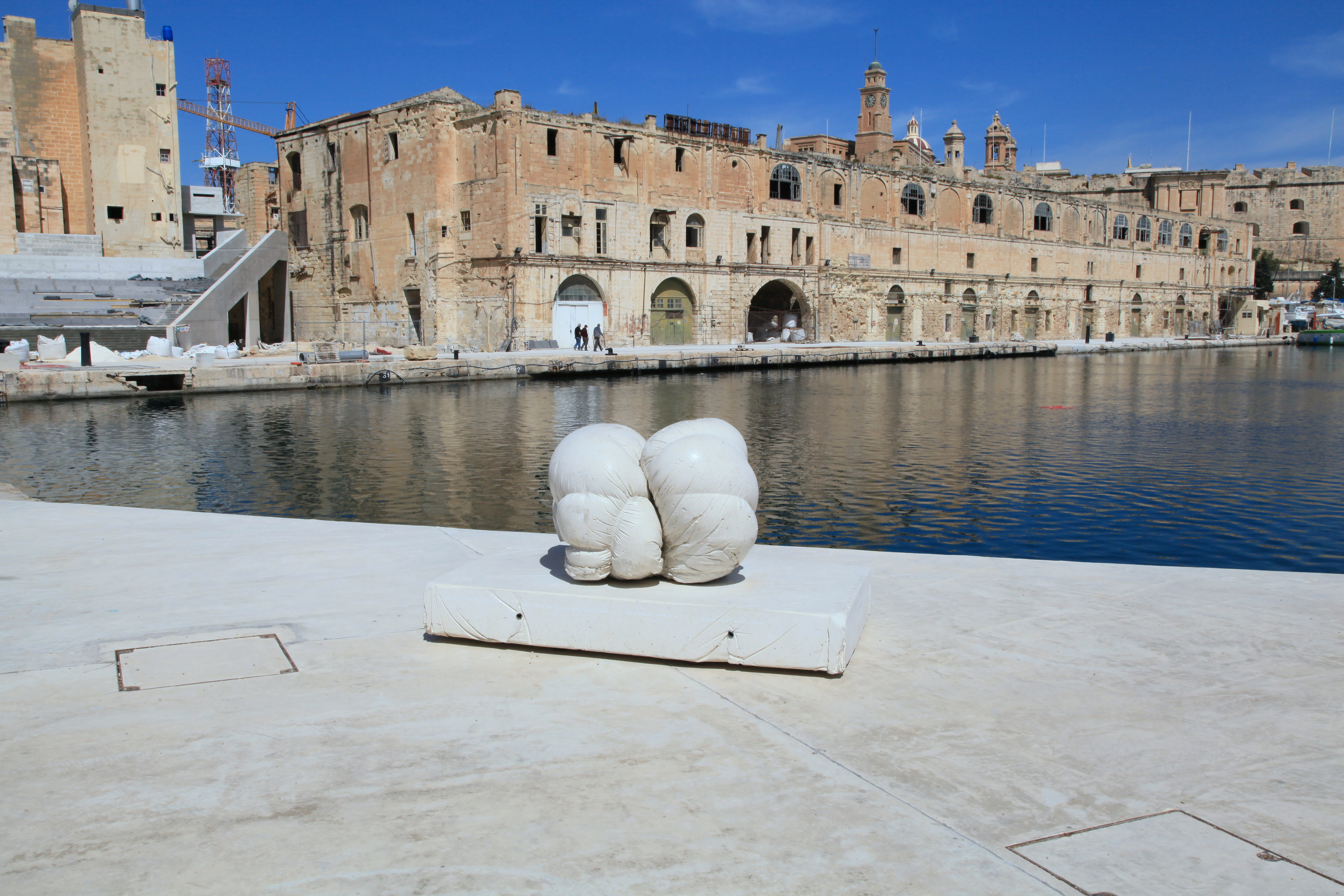
Galley Storehouse of the Knights of Malta, to which a top floor was added in 1804 to house a ropewalk.

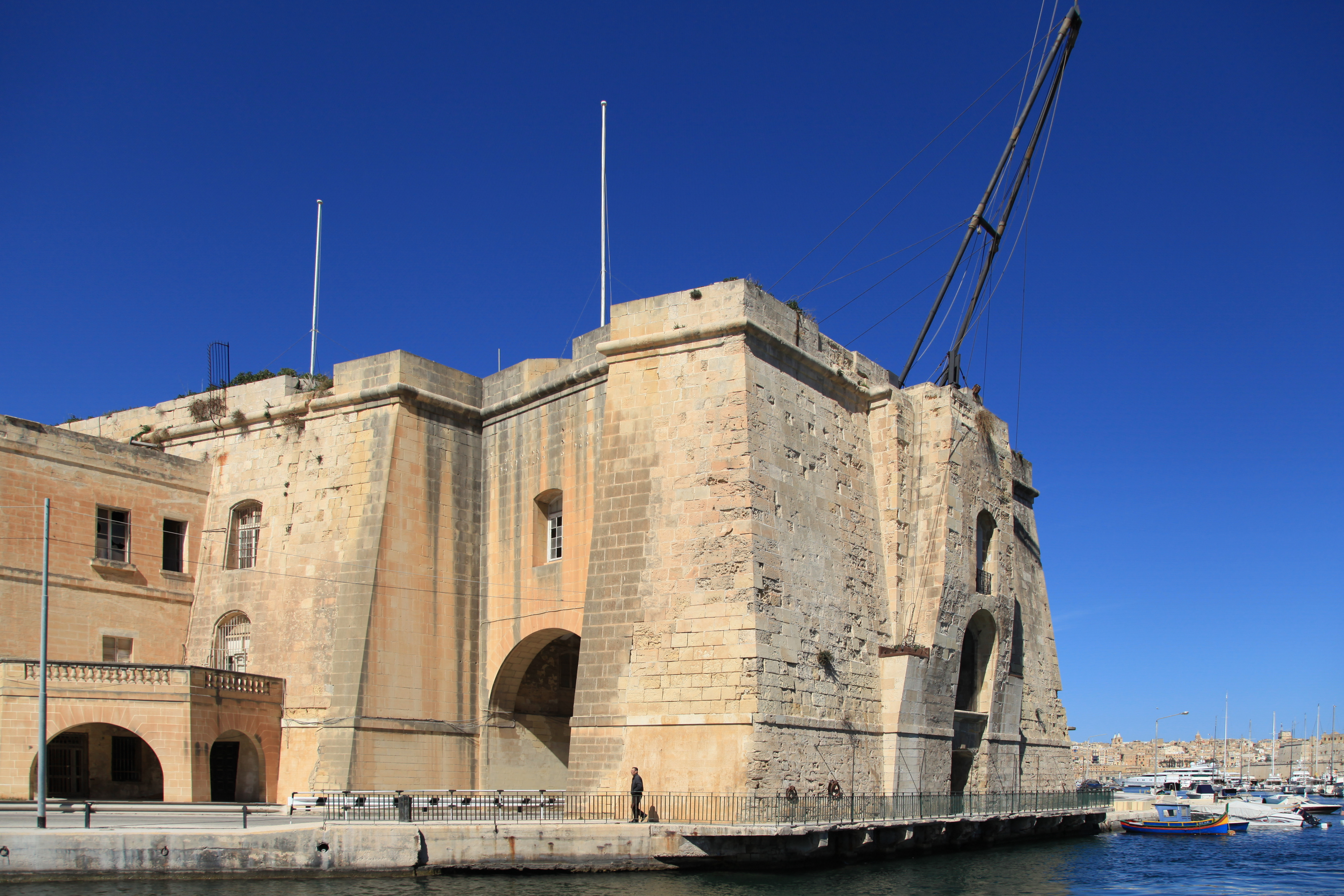
The masting sheer on Sheer Bastion in Dockyard Creek.

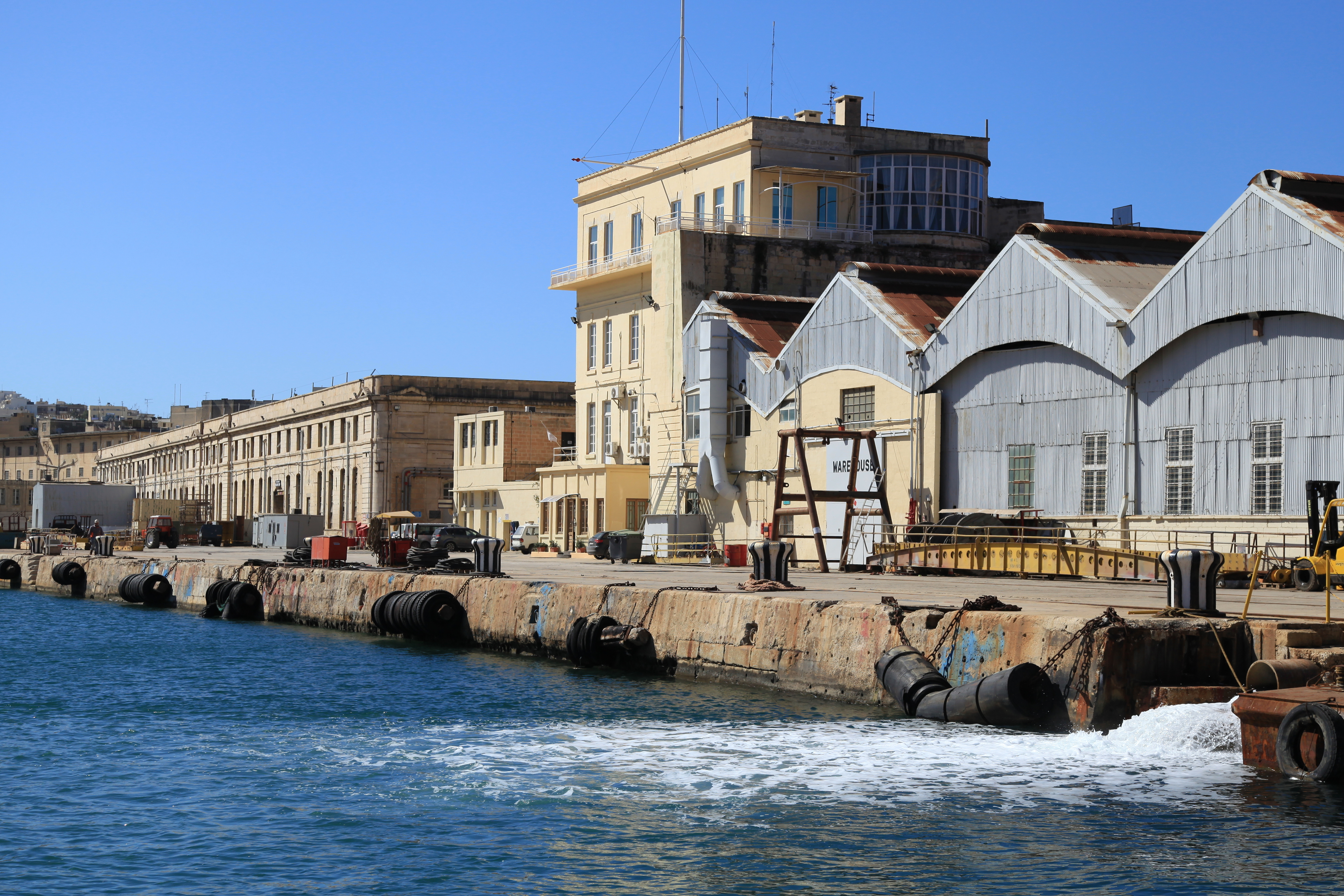
Early 20th-century machine shop (left) and boat sheds (right) alongside No. 7 dock and the adjacent wharf.

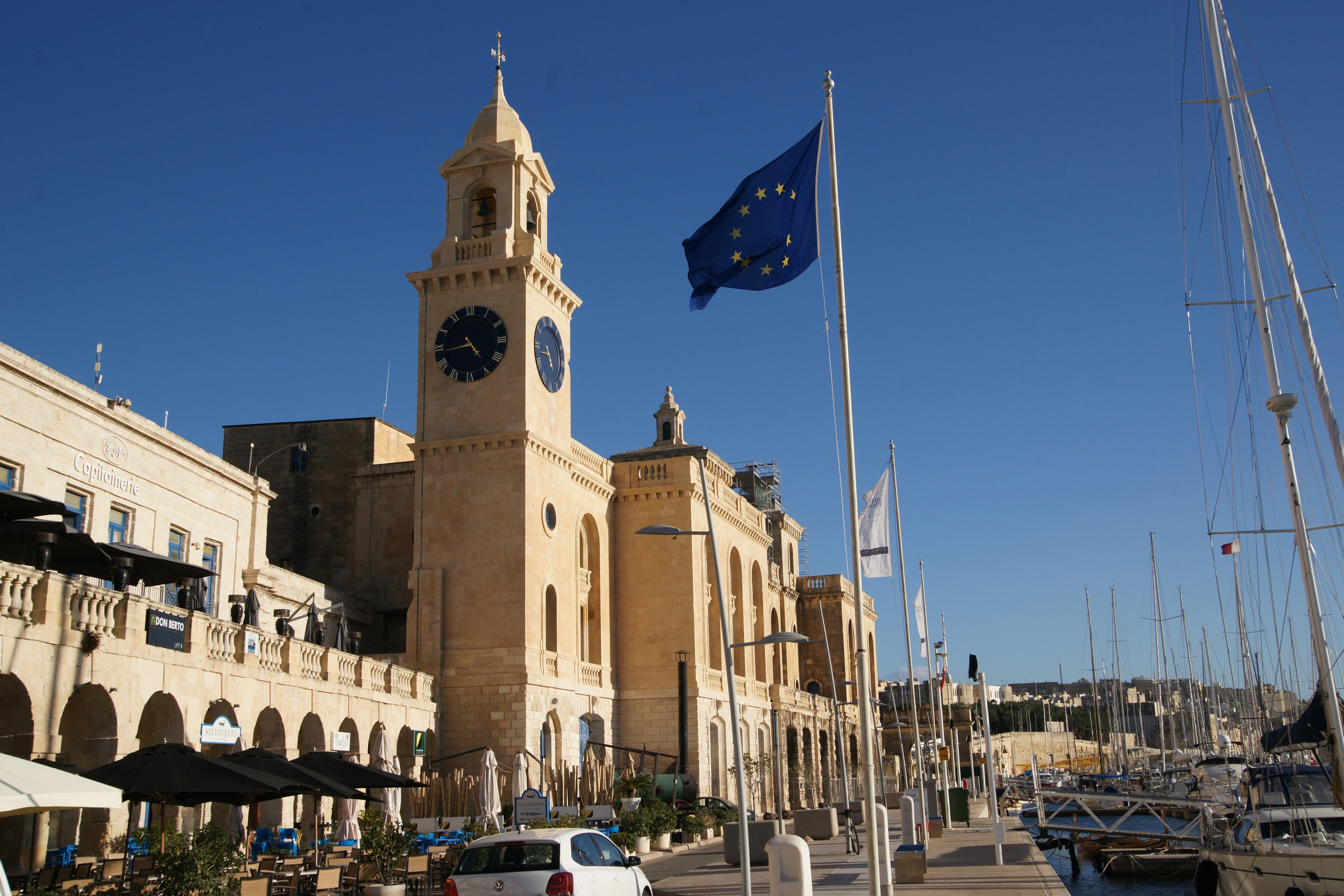
Former Victualling Yard bakery building (1844), which now houses the Malta Maritime Museum.

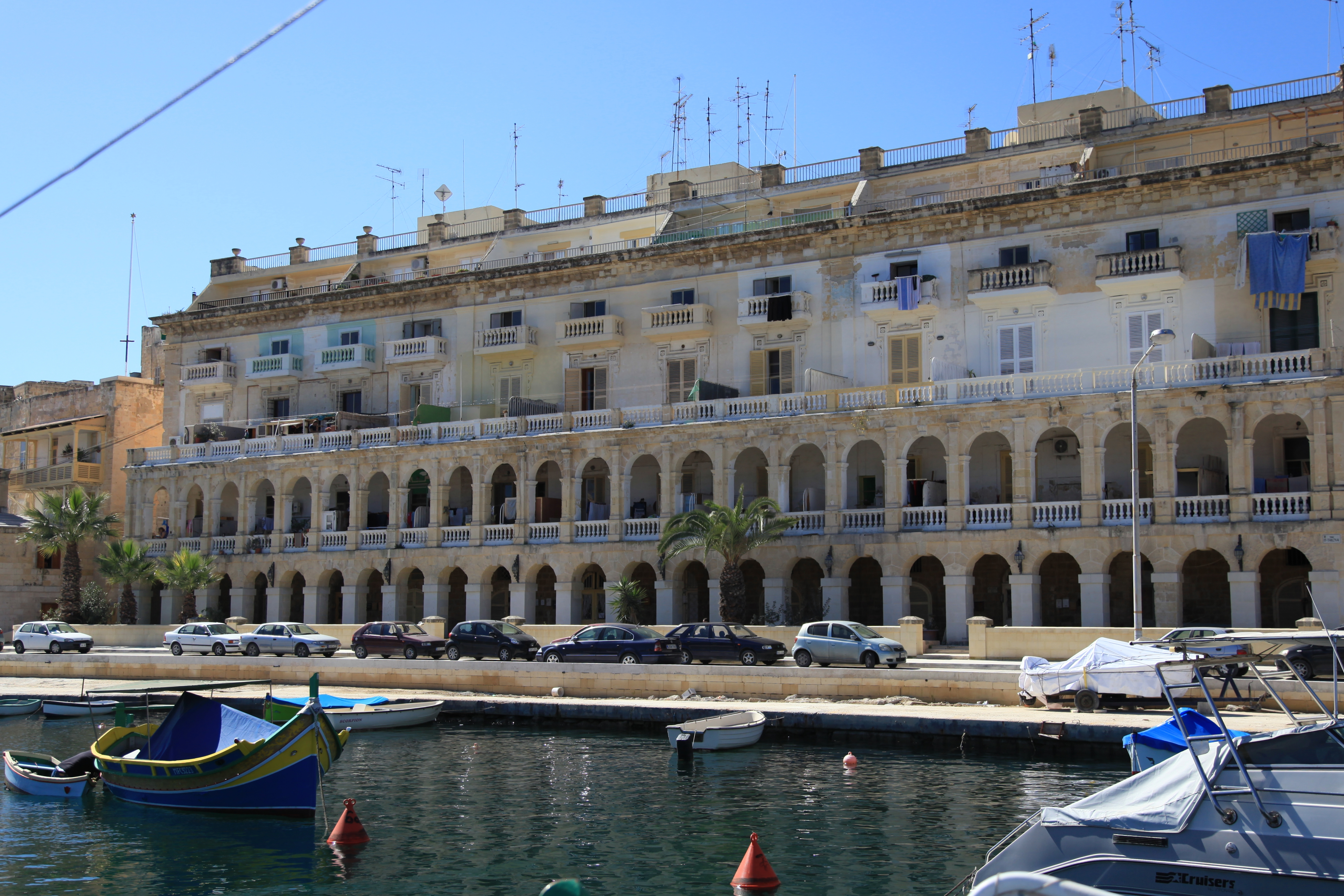
A terrace, built to house galley captains, provided residences for the officers of the dockyard until the 1960s.

== Sources ==
- Macintyre, Donald, The Naval War Against Hitler, New York: Charles Scribner's Sons, 1971
