= Arthur Bromley =

Rear-Admiral Arhur Bromley
- Born: 16 September 1847; Dublin, United Kingdom of Great Britain and Ireland
- Died: 25 October 1909 (aged 62); Sussex, United Kingdom
- Military career
- Allegiance: United Kingdom
- Branch: Royal Navy
- Rank: Rear-Admiral
- Commands: HMS Hood; Malta Dockyard

Rear-Admiral Arthur Charles Burgoyne Bromley (16 September 1847 – 25 October 1909) was a Royal Navy officer who became Admiral Superintendent of Malta Dockyard.

== Early life ==
Bromley was born in Dublin, the son of civil servant Sir Richard Madox Bromley and his wife, Clara Moser.

== Naval career ==
Promoted to captain on 30 June 1888, Bromley became commanding officer of the battleship HMS Hood in September 1897 and Inspecting Captain of Boys' Training Ships in January 1899. Promoted to rear admiral on 2 November 1901, he became Admiral Superintendent of Malta Dockyard in January 1905. He was promoted to vice admiral on 8 March 1906.

Military offices
Preceded by James Hammet	Admiral Superintendent, Malta Dockyard; 1905–1907	Succeeded by Frederic Fisher
