= Robert Douglas (Royal Navy officer) =

Royal Navy Admiral (1829–1910)

Admiral Robert Douglas
- Born: 7 June 1829
- Died: 12 January 1910 (aged 80)
- Military career
- Allegiance: United Kingdom
- Branch: Royal Navy
- Rank: Admiral
- Commands: HMS Cossack; HMS Newcastle; HMS Warrior; Malta Dockyard

Admiral Robert Gordon Douglas (7 June 1829 – 12 January 1910) was a Royal Navy officer who became Admiral Superintendent of Malta Dockyard.

== Naval career ==
Promoted to lieutenant on 3 May 1853 and captain on 11 April 1866, Douglas became commanding officer of the corvette HMS Cossack in August 1871, commanding officer of the frigate HMS Newcastle in September 1874 and commanding officer of the frigate HMS Warrior in March 1878. Promoted to rear admiral on 8 January 1883, he became Admiral Superintendent of Malta Dockyard in 1887. He was promoted to vice admiral on 15 December 1888 and to full admiral on 9 December 1894.

== Family ==
His youngest son Archibald George Gordon died in December 1902, only 18 years old.

Military offices
Preceded by William Ward	Admiral Superintendent, Malta Dockyard; 1887–1889	Succeeded by Alexander Buller
