= Frederic Fisher =

Royal Navy Admiral (1851–1943)

Admiral Sir Frederic Fisher KCVO
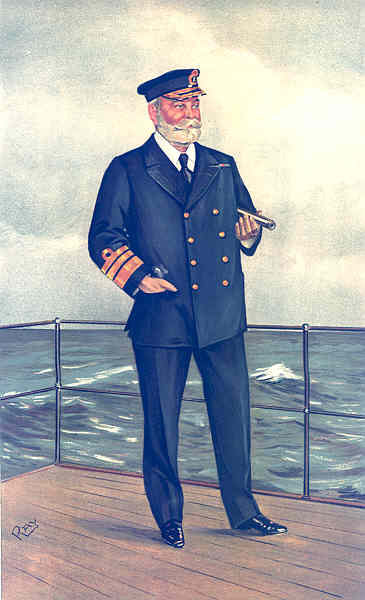
- Sir Frederic Fisher
- Born: 5 October 1851
- Died: 23 December 1943 (aged 92)
- Military career
- Allegiance: United Kingdom
- Branch: Royal Navy
- Rank: Admiral
- Commands: HMS Grafton; HMS Collingwood; HMS Illustrious; HMS Revenge; HMS Canopus; Royal Naval College, Greenwich
- Awards: Knight Commander of the Royal Victorian Order

Admiral Sir Frederic William Fisher KCVO (5 October 1851 – 23 December 1943) was a Royal Navy officer who became President of the Royal Naval College, Greenwich.

== Naval career ==
Born the son of Captain William Fisher and the younger brother of John Fisher, Fisher joined the Royal Navy around 1870. He was given command of the cruiser HMS Grafton in 1898 and the battleship HMS Collingwood in 1899. In early February 1900 it was announced that Fisher would be appointed in command of the battleship HMS Illustrious, but the appointment was cancelled, and he remained in charge of Collingwood for another couple of months, until on 16 April 1900 he took command of the old ironclad HMS Alexandra, flagship of the Admiral-Superintendent of Naval Reserves at Portsmouth.

On 18 April 1901, he commissioned at Chatham the pre-dreadnought battleship HMS Revenge, which was to serve both as coast guard ship at Portland and flagship of Rear-Admiral Sir Gerard Noel, Admiral Superintendent of Naval Reserves. He received command of the battleship HMS Canopus in 1904. He went on to be Admiral Superintendent of Malta Dockyard in 1907 and President of the Royal Naval College, Greenwich in 1911 before retiring in 1914.

Military offices
Preceded by Arthur Bromley	Admiral Superintendent, Malta Dockyard; 1907–1910	Succeeded by Ernest Simons
Preceded by Sir John Durnford	President, Royal Naval College, Greenwich; 1911–1914	Succeeded by Sir Alexander Bethell
