= James Hammet =

UK Royal Navy officer (1848–1905)

Vice-Admiral James Hammet CVO
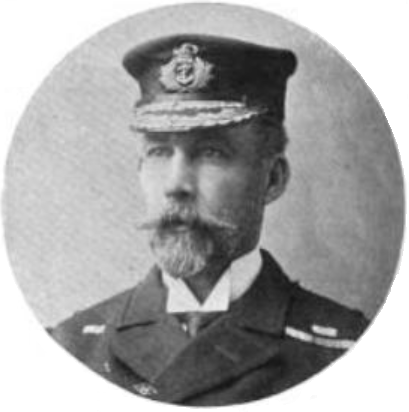
- Born: James Lacon Hammet; 15 May 1848
- Died: 15 February 1905 (aged 56)
- Military career
- Allegiance: United Kingdom
- Branch: Royal Navy
- Rank: Vice-Admiral
- Commands: HMS Nile; HMS Sans Pareil; Malta Dockyard
- Awards: Commander of the Royal Victorian Order

Vice-Admiral James Lacon Hammet CVO (15 May 1848 – 15 February 1905) was a Royal Navy officer who became Admiral Superintendent of Malta Dockyard.

== Naval career ==
Promoted to captain on 1 January 1886, Hammet became commanding officer of the battleship HMS Nile in November 1893, commanding officer of the battleship HMS Sans Pareil in February 1896 and Captain of the Portsmouth Fleet Reserve in January 1898. Promoted to rear admiral on 4 March 1894, he became Admiral Superintendent of Malta Dockyard in January 1902. He was promoted to vice admiral on 1 January 1905.

Military offices
Preceded by Burges Watson	Admiral Superintendent, Malta Dockyard; 1902–1905	Succeeded by Arthur Bromley
