= Jocelyn Salter =

Royal Navy Vice Admiral (1901–1989)

Vice-Admiral Jocelyn Salter DSO & Bar OBE
- Born: 24 November 1901
- Died: 27 May 1989 (aged 87)
- Military career
- Allegiance: United Kingdom
- Branch: Royal Navy
- Rank: Vice-Admiral
- Commands: HMS Duncan; HMS Foresight; HMS Mackay; HMS Eglington; HMS Jamaica; Malta Dockyard; HMNB Portsmouth
- Conflicts: World War I World War II
- Awards: Distinguished Service Order; Officer of the Order of the British Empire

Vice-Admiral Jocelyn Stuart Cambridge Salter, DSO & Bar OBE, (24 November 1901 – 27 May 1989), was a Royal Navy officer who became Flag Officer, Malta.

== Naval career ==
Salter joined the Royal Navy in 1915 and served in the First World War. He also served in the Second World War becoming commanding officer of the destroyer HMS Duncan in January 1940, commanding officer of the destroyer HMS Foresight in January 1941 and deputy director of Training and Staff Duties at the Admiralty in August 1942. He went on to be commanding officer of the destroyer HMS Mackay in June 1944 and commanding officer of the destroyer HMS Eglington in November 1944.

After the War Salter became commanding officer of the RN Air Station at Sembawang in December 1945, Captain of HMNB Rosyth in March 1948 and commanding officer of the cruiser HMS Jamaica in March 1950. After that he became Flag Officer, Malta in September 1952 and Admiral Superintendent, HMNB Portsmouth in October 1954.

Military offices
Preceded by Geoffrey Hawkins	Flag Officer, Malta; 1952–1954	Succeeded by Wilfred Brittain
