= Burges Watson =

Rear-Admiral Burges Watson CVO
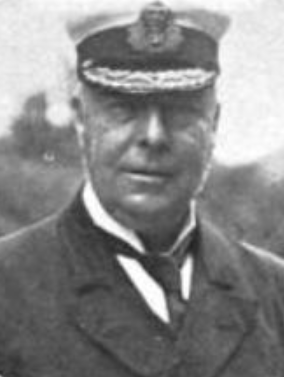
- Born: 24 September 1846
- Died: 21 September 1902 (aged 55); Malta
- Military career
- Allegiance: United Kingdom
- Branch: Royal Navy
- Rank: Rear-Admiral
- Commands: HMS Leander; HMS Royal Oak; Pembroke Dockyard; Malta Dockyard
- Awards: Commander of the Royal Victorian Order

Rear-Admiral Burges Watson, CVO (24 September 1846 – 21 September 1902) was a Royal Navy officer who became Admiral Superintendent, Malta Dockyard.

== Naval career ==
Watson entered the Royal Navy in 1860, was promoted to lieutenant in 1866, and to commander in 1879.

Promoted to captain on 31 December 1885, Watson became commanding officer of the cruiser HMS Leander in February 1889 and commanding officer of the battleship HMS Royal Oak in January 1896. He went on to be Captain Superintendent of Pembroke Dockyard from October 1896 until October 1899. A naval Aide-de-camp to Queen Victoria from 1898 to 1899, he was promoted to flag rank as rear-admiral on 25 August 1899, and appointed a Commander of the Royal Victorian Order (CVO) the same year. The following year, he was appointed Admiral Superintendent, Malta Dockyard in February 1900. When Lord Charles Beresford resigned as Second-in-Command of the Mediterranean Fleet in January 1902, Watson was appointed to succeed him, taking over the battleship HMS Ramillies as his flag ship.

Watson was landed at Malta on 19 September 1902 due to a severe attack of pneumonia, and died there on 21 September 1902. He was buried at the old naval cemetery at Bighi two days later.

== Family ==
Wilson married, in 1882, Marie Thérèse Fisher, daughter of homeopathic doctor Carl Fischer. The pair's eldest son, Fischer Watson, was born on 3 September 1884 and also became a Rear Admiral in the Royal Navy.

Military offices
| Preceded by Charles J Balfour | Captain-Superintendent, Pembroke Dockyard; 1896–1899 | Succeeded by Charles James Barlow |
| Preceded by Rodney Lloyd | Admiral Superintendent, Malta Dockyard; 1900–1902 | Succeeded by James Hammet |
