= Rodney Lloyd =

Royal Navy officer

Admiral Rodney Lloyd CB
- Born: 3 July 1841
- Died: 16 May 1911 (aged 69)
- Military career
- Allegiance: United Kingdom
- Branch: Royal Navy
- Rank: Admiral
- Commands: Jamaica station Malta Dockyard
- Awards: Companion of the Order of the Bath

Admiral Rodney Maclaine Lloyd CB (3 July 1841 – 16 May 1911) was a Royal Navy officer who became Admiral Superintendent of Malta Dockyard.

He was the third son, and fifth child, of Edmund and Catherine Elizabeth Lloyd who were living at Fairfield House in Castle Street, Thornbury.

== Naval career ==
Lloyd became Commodore in Charge at Jamaica, with his broad pennant in the troopship HMS Urgent, in September 1889 and, having been promoted to rear admiral on 4 March 1894, he became Admiral Superintendent of Malta Dockyard in February 1897. His tenure ended in April 1900, and he was promoted to vice admiral on 10 August 1900. He retired at his own request on 1 September 1902, though was promoted to full admiral on the retired list on 16 June 1904. Lloyd sometimes sat as a nautical assessor with the Judicial Committee of the Privy Council.

Military offices
Preceded by Richard Duckworth-King	Admiral Superintendent, Malta Dockyard; 1897–1900	Succeeded by Burges Watson
