= Wilfred Brittain =

Royal Navy rear-admiral (1903-1979)

Rear-Admiral Wilfred Brittain CB CBE
- Born: 19 June 1903
- Died: 1979 (aged 75–76); Hampshire, England
- Military career
- Allegiance: United Kingdom
- Branch: Royal Navy
- Rank: Rear-Admiral
- Commands: HMS Royalist; Malta Dockyard
- Conflicts: World War I World War II
- Awards: Companion of the Order of the Bath; Commander of the Order of the British Empire

Rear-Admiral Wilfred Geoffrey Brittain CB CBE (19 June 1903 – 1979) was a Royal Navy officer who became Flag Officer, Malta.

== Naval career ==
Brittain joined the Royal Navy in January 1917 during World War I. He also served in World War II becoming commanding officer of the cruiser HMS Royalist in December 1944. After the War he became Director of Navigation at the Admiralty in December 1949, Captain of the Fleet, Home Fleet in April 1952 and Flag Officer, Malta in August 1954.

Military offices
Preceded by Jocelyn Salter	Flag Officer, Malta; 1954–1957	Succeeded by Sir Charles Madden
