= William Ward (Royal Navy officer) =

Royal Navy Admiral (1829–1900)

Admiral The Honourable William Ward
- Born: 9 December 1829
- Died: 20 November 1900 (aged 70)
- Military career
- Allegiance: United Kingdom
- Branch: Royal Navy
- Rank: Admiral
- Commands: Malta Dockyard

Admiral William John Ward (9 December 1829 – 20 November 1900) was a Royal Navy officer who became Admiral Superintendent of the Malta Dockyard.

== Naval career ==
Born the son of Edward Southwell Ward, 3rd Viscount Bangor, Ward joined the Royal Navy in 1843. He served as the captain of the ironclad HMS Swiftsure in the early 1870s. Promoted to rear admiral on 23 July 1880, he became Admiral Superintendent of the Malta Dockyard in March 1885. He was promoted to vice admiral on 7 July 1886 and to full admiral on 5 April 1892.

== Bibliography ==
- Ballard, G. A. (1948). "British Central-Battery Ships: Swiftsure and Triumph". Mariner's Mirror. 34 (2): 98–111. doi:10.1080/00253359.1948.10657514. ISSN 2049-680X.

Military offices
Preceded by William Graham	Admiral Superintendent, Malta Dockyard; 1885–1887	Succeeded by Robert Douglas
