= Richard Tracey (Royal Navy officer) =

Royal Navy Admiral (1837–1907)

Admiral Sir Richard Tracey KCB
- Born: 24 January 1837
- Died: 7 March 1907 (aged 70)
- Military career
- Allegiance: United Kingdom
- Branch: Royal Navy
- Service years: 1852–1902
- Rank: Admiral
- Commands: HMS Iron Duke; HMS Sultan; Malta Dockyard; Royal Naval College, Greenwich
- Conflicts: Crimean War; Late Tokugawa Shogunate conflicts
- Awards: Knight Commander of the Order of the Bath

Admiral Sir Richard Edward Tracey KCB (24 January 1837 – 7 March 1907) was a Royal Navy officer who became President of the Royal Naval College, Greenwich.

== Naval career ==
Tracey joined the Royal Navy in 1852 and served in the Baltic Sea during the Crimean War. He took part in the Bombardment of Kagoshima in 1863 and the Shimonoseki Campaign in 1864 during the Late Tokugawa Shogunate conflicts. British diplomat Ernest Satow, appointed as interpreter to Admiral Kuper on board HMS Euryalus during the Shimonoseki Campaign, noted Tracey's "love of books" and his "wide knowledge of modern languages, acquired by dint of sheer perseverance amid all the nosiy distractions of life on board ship".

At the request of the Bakamatsu Government and on the recommendation of the British Consul, Sir Harry Smith Parkes and Ernest Satow, Tracey was invited by them to assist in the organization of a naval training school at Tsukiji, Tokyo an institution that after the Meiji Restoration became the Imperial Japanese Naval Academy.

Tracey subsequently became Commanding Officer of the battleship HMS Iron Duke, flagship of the Commander-in-Chief, China, in 1881 and Commanding Officer of the ironclad warship HMS Sultan in 1884. In April 1885 Tracey became an aide-de-camp to Queen Victoria, and in July was appointed to Portsmouth dockyard. He reached flag rank on 1 January 1888. He went on to be Second-in-Command of the Channel Squadron in 1889, Admiral Superintendent of Malta Dockyard in 1892 and President of the Royal Naval College, Greenwich in 1897 He was placed on the retired list 24 January 1902.

He is buried at Kensal Green Cemetery.

== See also ==
- Tracey Mission

== Sources ==
- Clowes, Sir William Laird, The Royal Navy : a history from the earliest times to the present Published by S. Low, Marston and Company, Limited, London, 1903.

Military offices
Preceded by Alexander Buller	Admiral Superintendent, Malta Dockyard; 1892–1894	Succeeded by Richard Duckworth-King
Preceded by Sir Walter Hunt-Grubbe	President, Royal Naval College, Greenwich; 1897–1900	Succeeded by Sir Robert More-Molyneux
