= Philip Clarke (Royal Navy officer) =

Royal Navy Rear Admiral (1898–1966)

Rear-Admiral Sir Philip Clarke KBE CB DSO
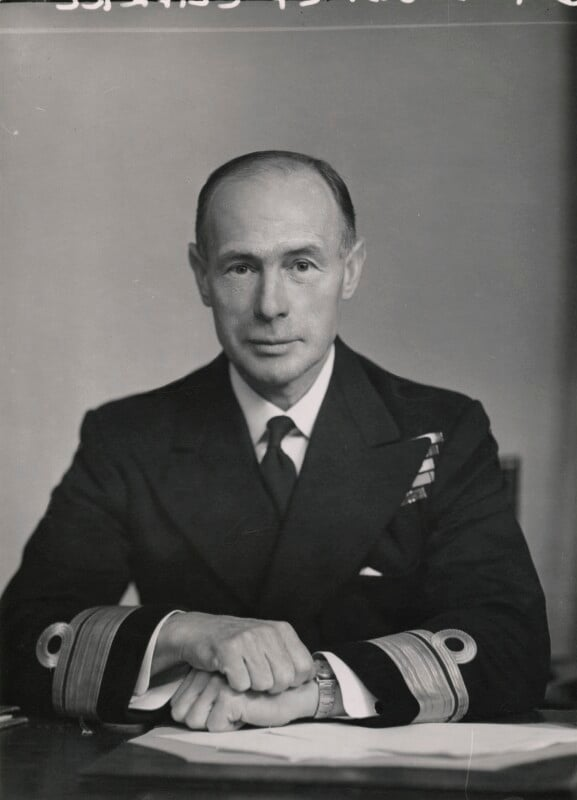
- Clarke in 1951
- Born: 14 March 1898
- Died: 13 November 1966 (aged 68)
- Military career
- Allegiance: United Kingdom
- Branch: Royal Navy
- Rank: Rear Admiral
- Commands: HMS Caledon; HMS Glasgow; Malta Dockyard
- Conflicts: World War I World War II
- Awards: Knight Commander of the Order of the British Empire; Companion of the Order of the Bath; Distinguished Service Order

Rear Admiral Sir Charles Philip Clarke, KBE, CB, DSO (14 March 1898 – 13 November 1966) was a Royal Navy officer who became Flag Officer, Malta.

== Naval career ==
Clarke joined the Royal Navy in 1911 and was promoted to midshipman in 1914 at the start of the First World War. He served in the Second World War becoming commanding officer of the cruiser HMS Caledon in July 1939 and commanding officer of the cruiser HMS Glasgow in November 1943.

Clarke became Director of Mobilisation at the Admiralty in March 1946 and Flag Officer, Malta in June 1948. In retirement he served as President of the Institution of Electronic and Radio Engineers from 1955 to 1956.

Military offices
Preceded by Marcel Kelsey	Flag Officer, Malta; 1948–1950	Succeeded by Geoffrey Hawkins
