= Richard Duckworth-King =

Royal Navy Vice-Admiral (1840–1900)

Vice-Admiral Richard Duckworth-King
- Born: 16 July 1840
- Died: 4 January 1900 (aged 59)
- Military career
- Allegiance: United Kingdom
- Branch: Royal Navy
- Rank: Vice-Admiral
- Commands: Malta Dockyard

Vice-Admiral Richard Duckworth-King (16 July 1840 – 4 January 1900) was a Royal Navy officer who became Admiral Superintendent at Malta Dockyard.

He was born the son of Lieutenant-Colonel Robert Cornwallis King and Evelina Maria Augusta Searle.

Duckworth-King became Flag Captain at Plymouth in September 1888, Captain Superintendent at Sheerness Dockyard and Admiral Superintendent at Malta Dockyard in January 1894.

He was promoted to rear-admiral in 1892 while at Sheerness, and to vice-admiral on 26 December 1897, before he retired the following year.

Military offices
| Preceded by Richard Tracey | Admiral Superintendent, Malta Dockyard; 1894–1897 | Succeeded by Rodney Lloyd |
