= Marcel Kelsey =

Vice-Admiral Marcel Kelsey CB DSC
- Born: 21 February 1894
- Died: 27 August 1964 (aged 70)
- Military career
- Allegiance: United Kingdom
- Branch: Royal Navy
- Rank: Vice-Admiral
- Commands: HMS Naiad; HMS Warspite; Malta Dockyard
- Conflicts: World War I World War II
- Awards: Companion of the Order of the Bath; Distinguished Service Cross

Vice-Admiral Marcel Harcourt Attwood Kelsey CB DSC (21 February 1894 – 27 August 1964) was a Royal Navy officer who became Flag Officer, Malta.

== Naval career ==
Kelsey joined the Royal Navy in September 1911 and served in the First World War. Promoted to captain on 31 December 1936, Kelsey became deputy director of Personal Services at the Admiralty in September 1937. He served in the Second World War becoming commanding officer of the cruiser HMS Naiad in April 1940, Commodore-in-Charge, Freetown in April 1942 and commanding officer of the battleship HMS Warspite in March 1944. As captain of HMS Warspite he led the bombardment squadron during Operation Infatuate, an Anglo-Canadian operation to open the port of Antwerp to shipping and relieve logistical constraints. He went on to be Commodore, Royal Naval Barracks, Chatham in January 1945.

After the War he became Flag Officer, Malta in June 1946.

Military offices
Preceded by Frederick Dalrymple-Hamilton	Flag Officer, Malta; 1946–1948	Succeeded by Philip Clarke
