= Charles Johnson (Royal Navy officer) =

Royal Navy Admiral (1869–1930)

Admiral Charles Johnson CB DSO MVO
- Born: 26 March 1869; Carbury, Ireland
- Died: 26 June 1930 (aged 61); Vichy, Auvergne, France
- Military career
- Allegiance: United Kingdom
- Branch: Royal Navy
- Rank: Admiral
- Commands: HMS Drake; HMS Powerful; HMS Minerva; HMS Dido; HMS Attentive; HMS Marlborough; Malta Dockyard
- Conflicts: World War I
- Awards: Legion of Honour – (1916)

Admiral Charles Duncan Johnson, CB, DSO, MVO (26 March 1869 – 26 June 1930) was a Royal Navy officer who became Admiral Superintendent of Malta Dockyard.

== First-class cricket ==
While stationed in British India, Johnson played two first-class cricket matches for the Europeans cricket team in 1893.

== Naval career ==
He entered the Royal Navy in July 1882, aged 13. Promoted to captain on 31 December 1909, Johnson became commanding officer of the cruiser HMS Drake in November 1911, commanding officer of the cruiser HMS Powerful in January 1912 and commanding officer of the cruiser HMS Minerva in December 1912 . He went on to be commanding officer of the cruiser HMS Dido in August 1913 and, having been promoted to commodore, became Second in Command of the Dover Patrol in November 1915 during the First World War. While at Dover he commanded the 6th Destroyer Flotilla in HMS Attentive.

For his assistance during the relief efforts of the 1908 Messina earthquake, he was appointed a Commander of the Order of the Crown of Italy in 1912. In 1915 he received letters on vellum in connection with operations during the sinking of submarine SM U-8. In 1916 he was appointed a Companion of the Distinguished Service Order, a Croix d'Officier of the Legion of Honour and a Commandeur of the Order of Leopold.

After the War, Johnson became commanding officer of the battleship HMS Marlborough in October 1918 and was appointed a Companion of the Order of the Bath "for valuable services in command of HMS Marlborough during the operations in Kaffa Bay, Russia" in 1919. He went on to be Rear Admiral, Reserve Fleet in April 1921 and Admiral Superintendent Malta Dockyard in February 1924 . He was promoted to vice admiral on 1 March 1926 and to full admiral on 8 May 1930.

== Grave ==
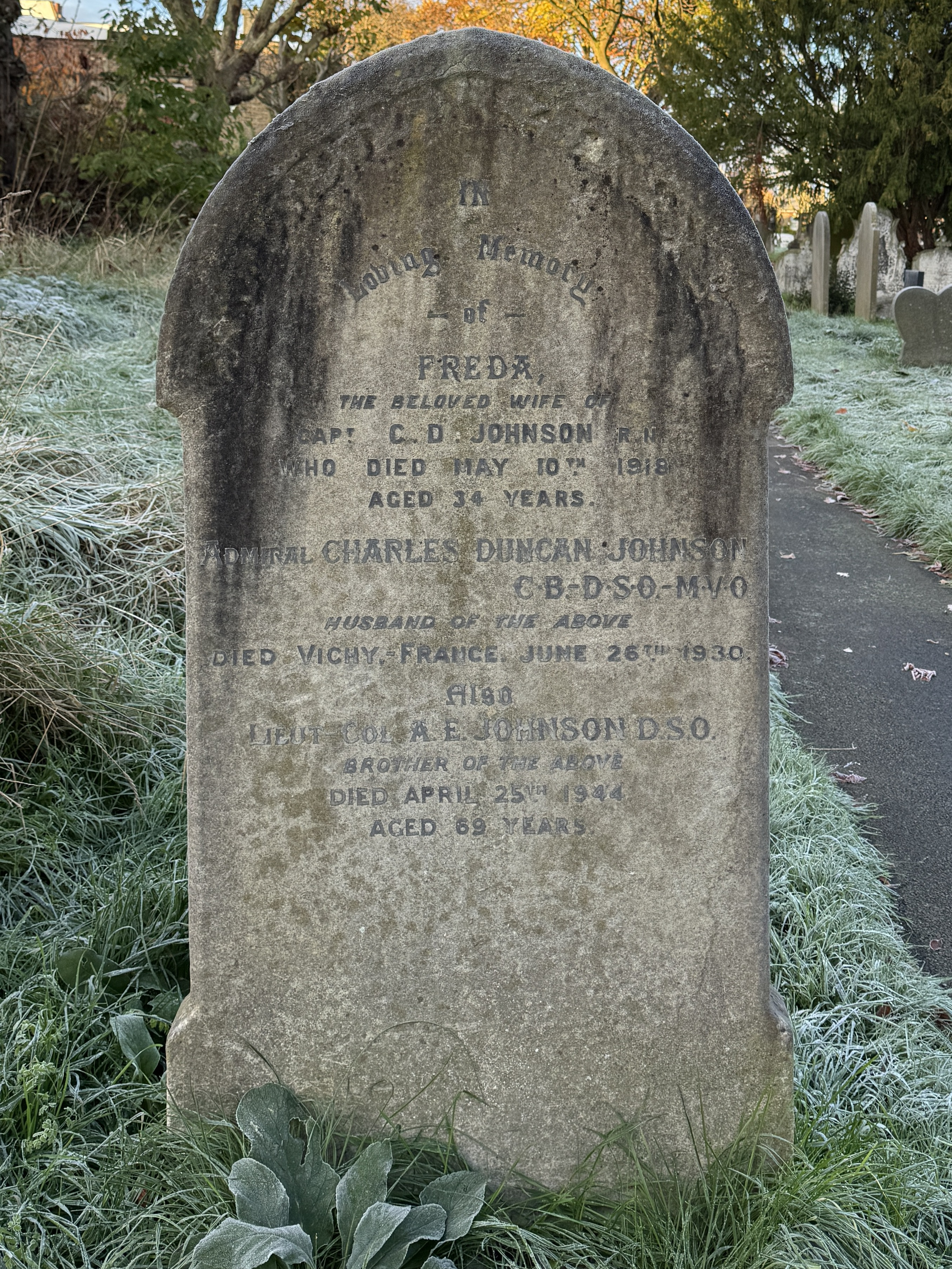

His grave is located at St Mary's Cemetery, Bolingbroke Grove, London.

Military offices
Preceded by John Luce	Admiral Superintendent, Malta Dockyard; 1924–1926	Succeeded by Alexander Campbell
