= HMS Urgent (1855) =

History

United Kingdom
- Name: HMS Urgent
- Builder: C. J. Mare, Blackwall
- Launched: 2 April 1855
- Completed: 29 September 1855
- Acquired: 13 June 1854
- Reclassified: Depot ship from March 1876
- Fate: Sold in June 1903

General characteristics
- Class & type: Iron screw troopship
- Displacement: 2,801 tons
- Tons burthen: 1,964 38/94 bm
- Length: 272 ft 3.5 in (83.0 m) (overall); 250 ft 3.5 in (76.3 m) (keel)
- Beam: 38 ft 5 in (11.7 m)
- Depth of hold: 26 ft 8.5 in (8.141 m)
- Installed power: 400 nhp; 1,483 ihp (1,106 kW)
- Propulsion: 2-cylinder horizontal single-expansion engine; Single screw
- Speed: 11.72 kn (21.71 km/h) (under engines)

HMS Urgent was an iron screw troopship of the Royal Navy. She served her later years as a storeship and depot ship based in Jamaica.

== Construction and commissioning ==
Urgent was originally constructed by C. J. Mare, of Blackwall, under the name Assaye. Also being constructed by Mare at this time was a near-sistership to Assaye, the Russian Sobraon. Assaye may have also been being built for Russian owners, as both ships were purchased by the Admiralty in 1854 to serve as auxiliaries in the Crimean War. Assaye was purchased under an Admiralty order dated 13 June 1854, and was launched on 2 April 1855. She completed fitting out for sea at Sheerness Dockyard on 29 September 1855, having by then cost a total of £89,936. She entered service as HMS Urgent, while her near-sister Sobraon was named HMS Perseverance.

== Service ==
On 21 October 1855, Urgent ran aground at Fort Ricasoli, Malta on a voyage from Plymouth, Devon. All 1,100 people on board were rescued. Having departed from Spithead on 28 February 1857, Urgent sprang a leak in the Bay of Biscay on 3 March. She put in to A Coruña, Spain in a sinking condition. On 1 November 1858, Urgent ran aground on the East Pole Sands, 6 nautical miles (11 km) east of the Nab Lightship whilst on a voyage from Corfu, United States of the Ionian Islands to Portsmouth. She was refloated with assistance from the Government tug Echo. From March 1859 she was under the command of Henry William Hire for service in the East Indies and China, and on 20 August 1859 was on the Hai River. From July 1864 she was under Samuel Hood Henderson. In August 1864, she ran aground at St. Anns, Nova Scotia, British North America. She was later refloated and taken in to Quebec City, Province of Canada, British North America, where she arrived on 5 September. Urgent was at Portsmouth in 1870.

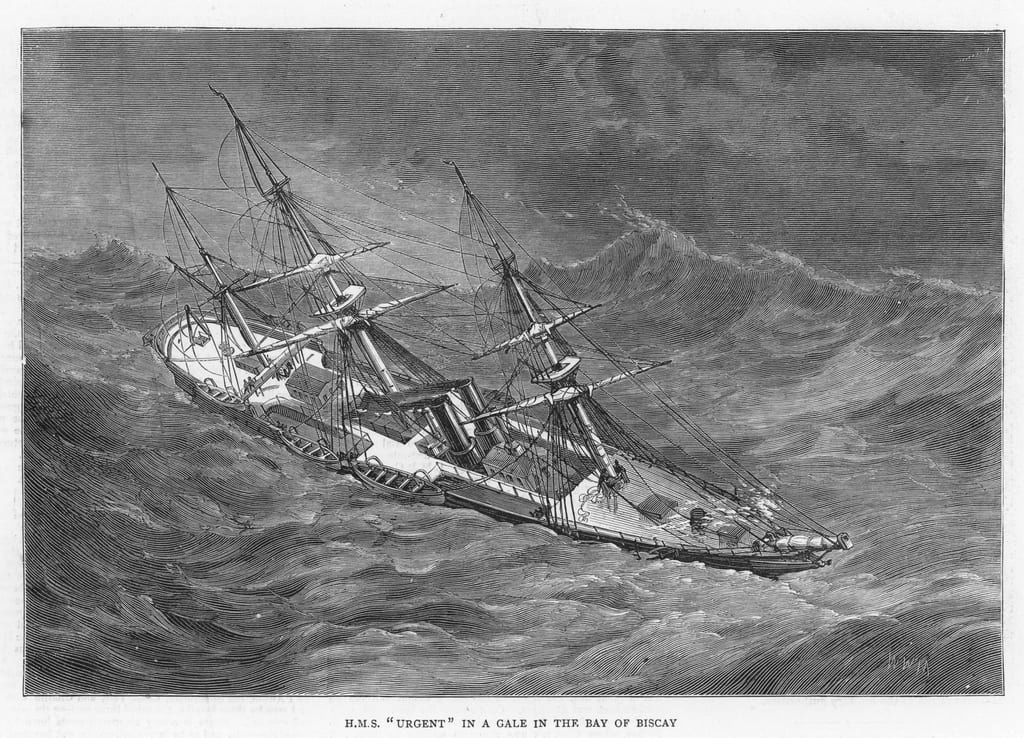
HMS Urgent in a gale in the Bay of Biscay, The Graphic 1871, by Walter William May

After service as a troopship, Urgent was moved to Jamaica and to serve as a depot ship, and was commissioned there in her new role on 21 July 1877.

In 1880, her tender was the gunboat HMS Tyrian, which was also used as a tug. From 1880 to 1885, her tender was the schooner HMS Sparrowhawk, which was surveying the area at the time. From February 1878 until 1890 Urgent flew the broad pendant of the Hon. William John Ward, the son of Edward Southwell Ward, 3rd Viscount Bangor. In 1886 Urgent came under the command of Francis Mowbray Prattent, and between September 1889 and 1890 she flew the broad pendant of Rodney Maclaine Lloyd. She finally flew the broad pendant of Daniel M K Riddel from March 1901.

She was sold for scrapping to Butler & Co in June 1903, after the naval establishment was moved ashore.

== Bibliography ==
- Jones, Colin (1996). "Entente Cordiale, 1865". In McLean, David & Preston, Antony (eds.). Warship 1996. London: Conway Maritime Press. ISBN 0-85177-685-X.
