= Duke of Bronte (ship) =

At least two vessels have been named Duke of Bronte for Lord Nelson, Duke of Bronte.

== Duke of Bronte (1800 ship) ==
- Duke of Bronte (1800 ship) was launched in 1793 (or 1794) in India, under another name. She was renamed in 1800 in London. She then made two voyages as a slaver in the triangular trade in enslaved people before a French privateer captured her in 1804.

== Duke of Bronte (1801 ship) ==
- Duke of Bronte, of 294 tons (bm), was launched at Dartmouth in 1801. Wreckage attributable to her was sighted in January 1822.

== Duke of Bronte (1803 ship) ==
- Duke of Bronte, of 195 tons (bm), was launched at Whitby in 1803. She was last seen at Shields in 1825.

== Duke of Bronte (1825 ship) ==
- Duke of Bronte (1825 ship), of 424 tons (bm), was launched at London. In 1851 she carried 130 settlers to New Zealand for the Canterbury Association. Captain John Thomas Barclay sailed from England on 10 January 1851. She arrived at Port Lyttelton on 5 June. On 13 March 1857, Duke of Bronte was driven ashore and wrecked at Kilrush. She was on a voyage from Alloa to Demerara. She was refloated on 28 March and towed in to Limerick, where she was found to be severely damaged.
