= HMS Newcastle (1860) =

Frigate of the Royal Navy

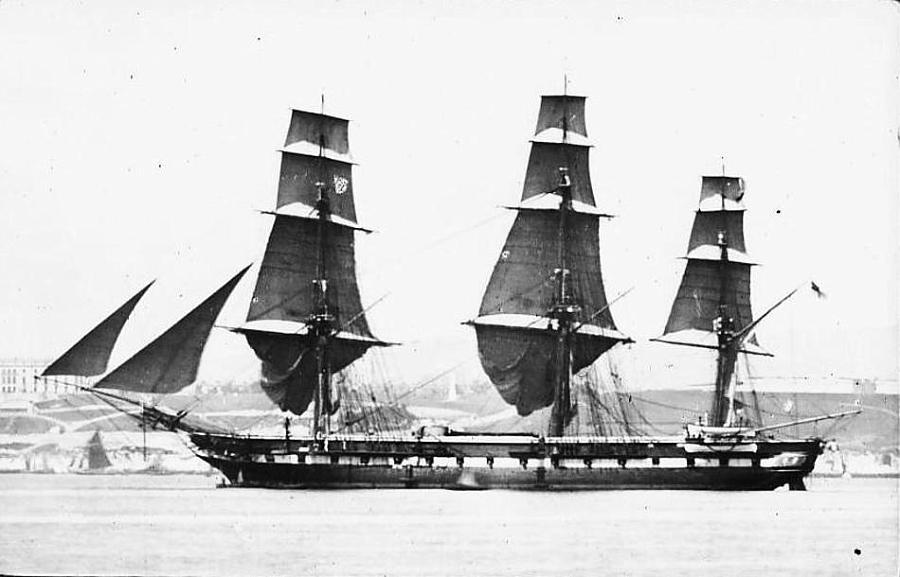
- Newcastle

History

United Kingdom
- Name: HMS Newcastle
- Namesake: Newcastle upon Tyne
- Builder: Deptford Dockyard
- Laid down: 6 December 1858
- Launched: 16 October 1860
- Completed: September 1874
- Decommissioned: 1888
- Fate: Sold for breaking up 1929

General characteristics
- Class & type: Bristol-class frigate
- Displacement: 4,020 long tons (4,080 t)
- Tons burthen: 3035
- Length: 250 ft (76.2 m)
- Beam: 52 ft (15.8 m)
- Draught: 21 ft (6.4 m)
- Installed power: 2,354 ihp (1,755 kW)
- Propulsion: 1 shaft, 1 Steam engine
- Speed: 12 knots (22 km/h; 14 mph)
- Complement: 550-600
- Armament: Thirty 8-inch (203 mm) muzzle-loading smoothbore guns; Twenty 32-pounder muzzle-loading smoothbore guns; One 68-pounder muzzle-loading smoothbore gun

HMS Newcastle was a wooden screw frigate, the fifth ship of the name to serve in the Royal Navy.
