= Alexander Campbell (Royal Navy officer) =

Vice-Admiral Alexander Campbell CB DSO MVO
- Born: 27 September 1874
- Died: 2 June 1957 (aged 82)
- Military career
- Allegiance: United Kingdom
- Branch: Royal Navy
- Rank: Vice-Admiral
- Commands: HMS Vengeance; HMS Prince George; HMS Albion; HMS Britannia; HMS King George V Royal Naval Barracks, Chatham; Malta Dockyard
- Conflicts: World War I
- Awards: Companion of the Order of the Bath (1924); Distinguished Service Order; Member of the Royal Victorian Order

Vice-Admiral Alexander Victor Campbell, CB, DSO, MVO (27 September 1874 – 2 June 1957) was a Royal Navy officer who became Admiral Superintendent of Malta Dockyard.

== Naval career ==
Campbell was promoted a lieutenant. He was appointed to the battleship HMS London on 31 May 1902, serving temporary as gunnery lieutenant during the first weeks.

Promoted to captain on 30 June 1913, Campbell became commanding officer of the battleship HMS Vengeance in May 1914 and the battleship HMS Prince George in August 1914, shortly after the start of World War I. He went on to be commanding officer of the battleship HMS Albion in February 1916, commanding officer of the battleship HMS Britannia in May 1916 and Chief of Staff to the Commander-in-Chief, The Nore, in July 1916. He later became commanding officer of the battleship HMS King George V in April 1918.

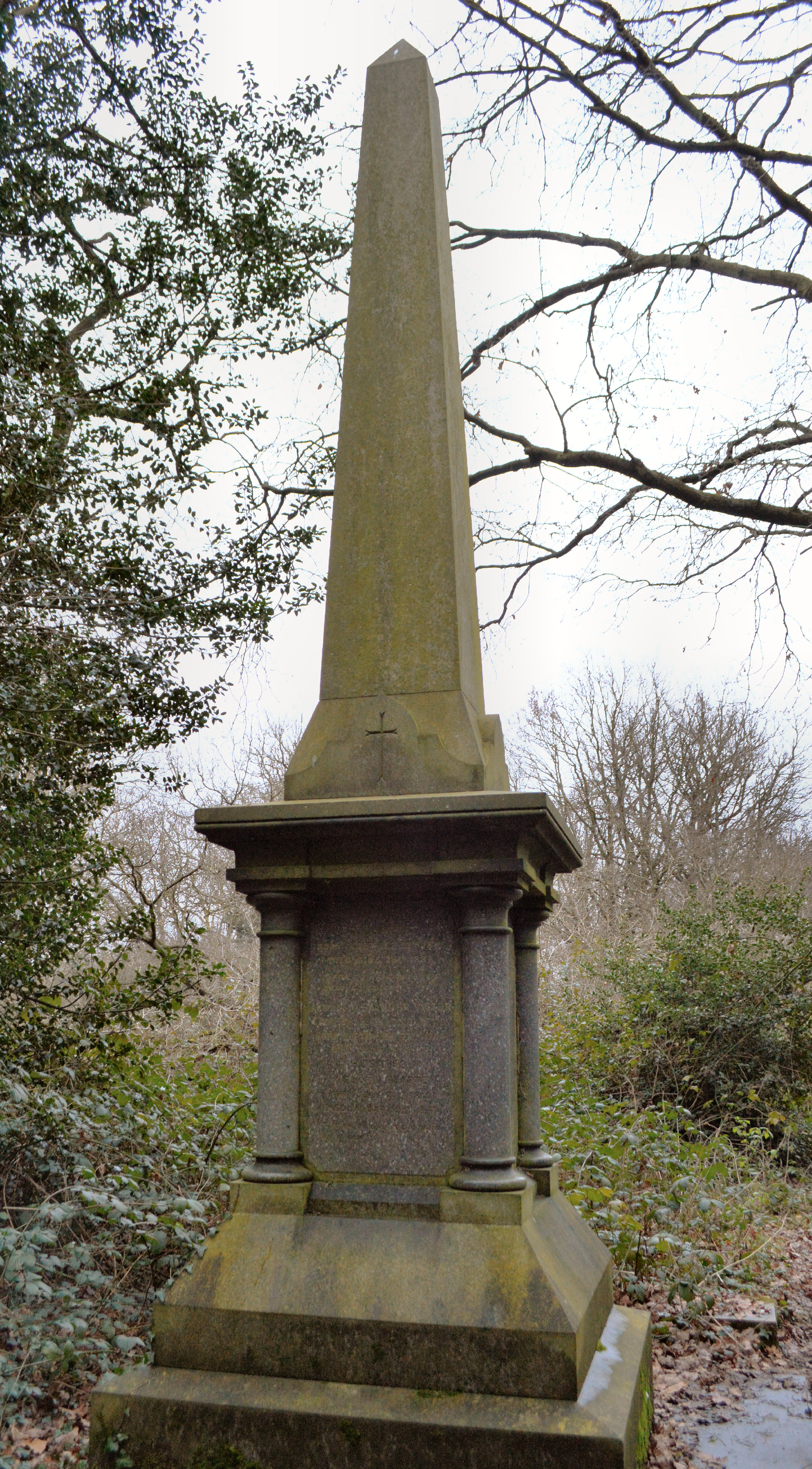
Memorial in Barnes Old Cemetery

After the War Campbell became Captain of the Fleet, Mediterranean Fleet, in September 1919 and Commodore of the Royal Naval Barracks, Chatham in May 1922. Promoted to rear admiral on 14 October 1923, he became Admiral Superintendent of Malta Dockyard in March 1926. He was promoted to vice admiral on 11 June 1928.

Military offices
Preceded by Charles Johnson	Admiral Superintendent, Malta Dockyard; 1926–1928	Succeeded by Francis Mitchell
