= 1923 New Year Honours =

British royal recognitions

The New Year Honours 1923 were appointments by King George V to various orders and honours to reward and highlight good works by members of the British Empire. They were published on 29 December 1922.

The recipients of honours are displayed here as they were styled before their new honour, and arranged by honour, with classes (Knight, Knight Grand Cross, etc.) and then divisions (Military, Civil, etc.) as appropriate.

== British Empire ==
=== Baronet ===
- Thomas Paxton,, Lord Provost of Glasgow.
- General the Right Honourable Sir Cecil Frederick Nevil Macready, GCMG, KCB.

=== Knight Bachelor ===
- Alderman Joseph Calvert, JP, Chairman, Middlesbrough Employment Committee.
- Thomas Basil Clarke. For public services.
- Thomas Edwin Cooper, FRIBA, Architect of Port of London Authority's new buildings.
- The Honourable Reginald William Coventry, KC. For services to the Joint Committee, St. John of Jerusalem and British Red Cross Society.
- Professor David Drummond, CBE, MA, MD, DCL, LLD, Vice-Chancellor, Durham University.
- William Heaton Hamer, , , FRCP, Medical Officer of Health for London.
- Edward Richard Harrison, Chief Inspector of Taxes, Inland Revenue Department.
- Captain Henry Gisborne Holt, JP, lately Comptroller to His Excellency the Lord Lieutenant of Ireland.
- John Hunt, OBE, Town Clerk of Westminster.
- Edward Manville, JP, MInstEE, MP. For services to the Board of Trade.
- Colonel Charles Langbridge Morgan, CBE, Member of Disposals Board.
- Bernard Henry Spilsbury, MA, MB, BCh. (Oxon), Hon. Pathologist to the Home Office.
- Herbert Edwin Pelham Hughes-Stanton, RA, president of the Royal Society of Painters in Water Colours.
- Henry Studdy Theobald, KC, Master in Lunacy.
- Skinner Turner, Judge of the British Supreme Court for China.
- Thomas Hunter Urwick, British Member of Managing Board for Restitution & Reparation in Kind, Reparation Commission.

India

- Kadamangudi Srinivasa Ayyangar, Member of the Executive Council, Fort St. George, Madras.
- Mr. Justice Francis du Pré Oldfield, Indian Civil Service, Judge of the High Court of Judicature, Madras.
- Colonel William Danvers Waghorn, CB, CMG, Royal Engineers, President, Railway Board.
- Henry Moncrieff Smith, CIE, Indian Civil Service, Secretary to the Government of India, Legislative Department.
- Thomas Clark Pilling Gibbons, KC, Advocate-General for the Presidency of Bengal.
- Mark Somers Hunter, Director of Public Instruction, Burma.
- Norman Walker, MD (Edin.)
- Khan Bahadur Haji Ismail Sait, Merchant, Bangalore, Mysore.
- Henry Pelham Wordsworth McNaghten, Merchant, Bombay.
- Campbell Ward Rhodes, CBE, Chairman, Bengal Chamber of Commerce, Calcutta.
- Dr. Sheikh Muhammad Iqbal, Barrister, Lahore, Punjab.
- Frank McCarthy, CBE, Journalist, Burma.
- Dewan Bahadur Chaube Raghunath Das, CSI, Dewan, Kotah State, Rajputana.
- Stephen Montagu Burrows, CIE, Secretary to the Oxford University Delegacy for Oriental Students.

Dominions & Colonies

- Harold Beauchamp, of the City of Wellington; lately Chairman of the board of directors of the Bank of New Zealand; a leading financial authority in the Dominion.
- Major-General George Cuscaden, VD, of the City of Melbourne; formerly Director General of Australian Army Medical Services.
- George Elliot, OBE, of the City of Auckland; Chairman of the Board of Directors of the Bank of New Zealand. Has frequently acted as Arbitrator in industrial disputes.
- Hilarion Marcus Fernando, MD, BSc, Member of the Executive Council and Nominated Unofficial Member of the Legislative Council of the Island of Ceylon.
- Edward Cleather Fraser, CMG, Nominated Member of the Council of Government of the Colony of Mauritius for many years.
- The Honourable George Thomas Plowman, CMG, Administrator of the Province of Natal, Union of South Africa.
- The Honourable Malcolm William Searle, Judge President of the Cape of Good Hope, Provincial Division, of the Supreme Court of South Africa.
- The Honourable David Storey, Member of the Legislative Council of the State of New South Wales, in recognition of his public services.
- Captain Frederick George Waley, CBE, RANR, of the City of Sydney. Formerly Federal Member of the Coal Board. Has rendered prominent services to Invalid Soldiers & Sailors in the Commonwealth of Australia.
- The Honourable Marmaduke George Winter, CBE, Member of the Legislative Council of Newfoundland, in recognition of his public services.
- Alfred Karney Young, Chief Justice of the Leeward Islands; Chief Justice designate of the Supreme Court of Fiji, and Judicial Commissioner for the Western Pacific.

=== Order of the Bath ===
==== Knight Grand Cross of the Order of the Bath (GCB) ====
Military Division

- General Sir William Riddell Birdwood, Bt, GCMG, KCB, KCSI, CIE, DSO, Indian Army, (Colonel, 12th Lancers), General Officer Commanding-in-Chief, Northern Command, India.

Civil Division

- Sir Norman Fenwick Warren Fisher, KCB, Secretary to the Treasury.

Additional Member

- The Right Honourable Sir John Anderson, KCB, late Chairman of the Board of Inland Revenue & Under-Secretary for Ireland, now Under-Secretary of State for the Home Department.

==== Knight Commander of the Order of the Bath (KCB) ====
Military Division

Royal Navy

- Vice-Admiral Sir George Price Webley Hope, KCMG, CB.
- Rear-Admiral Frederick Laurence Field, CB, CMG.
- Major-General Herbert Edward Blumberg, CB, Royal Marines.

Army

- Major-General Henry Broom Feilden, CB, retired pay.
- Major-General Gerald Farrell Boyd, CB, CMG, DSO, DCM. (Colonel, The Leinster Regiment).
- Lieutenant-General Sir Arthur Lyttelton Lyttelton-Annesley, KCVO, retired pay. (Colonel, 11th Hussars).
- Major-General Sir William Rice Edwards, KCIE, CB, CMG, MD, KHP, Director-General, Indian Medical Service.

Civil Division

Additional Members

- Sir Francis Nugent Greer, CB, KC, Third Parliamentary Counsel, late Parliamentary Draftsman to the Irish Office.
- Mark Beresford Russell Sturgis, Presiding Special Commissioner of Income Tax, late Assistant Under-Secretary for Ireland.
- Major-General Henry Hugh Tudor, CB, CMG.

==== Companion of the Order of the Bath (CB) ====
Military Division

Royal Navy

- Rear-Admiral Hugh Lindsay Patrick Heard, DSO.
- Engineer Rear-Admiral William Cory Sanders, DSO.
- Surgeon Rear-Admiral Jonathan Shand, MB.
- Captain Hugh Gaultier Coghill Somerville, DSO.
- Paymaster-Captain Henry Horniman.

Army

- Colonel (Temporary Colonel Commandant) Arthur James Poole, CMG, Brigade Commander, 16th Indian Infantry Brigade.
- Lieutenant-Colonel & Brevet Colonel Howard Ensor, CMG, DSO, MB, Royal Army Medical Corps.
- Colonel Frederick Welsley Hunt, CMG, CBE, Deputy Director of Veterinary Services, Southern Command.
- Colonel Henry William Newcome, CMG, DSO.
- Colonel (Temporary Colonel Commandant) George Alexander Weir, CMG, DSO, Commandant, Equitation~ School, Weedon.
- Colonel (Temporary Colonel Commandant) Charles Herbert Rankin, CMG, DSO, Brigade Commander, 2nd Indian Cavalry Brigade.
- Colonel Walter Joseph Maxwell-Scott, DSO.
- Colonel Harry Lionel Pritchard, CMG, DSO, Chief Engineer, Northern Command.
- Colonel John Edward Spencer Brind, CMG, DSO.
- Lieutenant-Colonel & Brevet Colonel Richard Deare Furley Oldman, CMG, DSO, The Wiltshire Regiment.
- Lieutenant-Colonel & Brevet Colonel Ernest Douglas Young, CMG, The Devonshire Regiment.
- Colonel Cranley Charlton Onslow, CMG, CBE, DSO, Brigade Commander, Staffordshire Infantry Brigade.
- Colonel (Temporary Colonel Commandant) Edward Arthur Fagan, CSI, CMG, DSO, Indian Army, Brigade Commander, 6th Indian Infantry Brigade.
- Colonel Manners Ralph Willmot Nightingale, CMG, CIE, DSO, Indian Army.
- Colonel (Temporary Colonel Commandant) Guy Archibald Hastings Beatty, CSI, CMG, DSO, Indian Army, Brigade Commander, 1st Indian Cavalry Brigade.

Royal Air Force

- Air Commodore Edward Alexander Dimsdale Masterman, CMG, CBE, AFC.

Additional Member

- Group Captain Ian Malcolm Bonham-Carter, OBE.

Civil Division

- Captain Thomas Henry Roberts-Wray, OBE, VD, ADC, Royal Naval Volunteer Reserve.
- John Harper Narbeth, CBE, MVO, Assistant Director of Naval Construction, Admiralty.
- Francis James Henderson Coutts, MD, BSc, Senior Medical Officer, Ministry of Health.
- Arthur James Dyke, CBE, Junior Commissioner and Joint Secretary, Board of Customs & Excise.
- Maurice Francis Headlam, Assistant Secretary, Treasury.
- Edward Highton Hodgson, OBE, Principal Assistant Secretary, Ministry of Pensions.
- Herbert William Malkin, CMG, Assistant Legal Adviser, Foreign Office.
- John Fitzgerald Moylan, CBE, Receiver, Metropolitan Police.
- Conrad James Naef, CBE, Accountant-General of the Navy.
- Reginald James Gresham Clive Paterson, Assistant Secretary, War Office.
- Harry Mead Taylor, Assistant Secretary & Accountant-General, Board of Trade.
- Arthur William Watson, CBE, Principal Assistant Secretary, Ministry of Labour.
- James Alexander Webster, DSO, Principal Assistant Secretary, Air Ministry.

Additional Members

- Alexander Percival Waterfield.
- Geoffrey Granville Whiskard.
- Edward Miles Clayton.
- Lieutenant-Colonel William Elliott, CBE, DSO.
- Captain Richard Southwell Windham Robert Wyndham-Quin, CBE, MC.

=== Order of the Star of India ===
==== Knight Commander of the Order of the Star of India (KCSI) ====
- Tej Bahadur Sapru, LLD, Member of the Viceroy's Council.
- Sir Ludovic Charles Porter, KCIE, CSI, OBE, Indian Civil Service, Member of Council, United Provinces.
- Sir Richard Havelock Charles, GCVO, Medical Adviser to the Secretary of State for India.

==== Companion of the Order of the Star of India (CSI) ====
- Samuel Perry O'Donnell, CIE, Indian Civil Service, Secretary to the Government of India, Home Department.
- Edward Mitchener Cook, CIE, Indian Civil Service, Secretary to the Government of India, Finance Department.
- Francis Charles Griffith, OBE, Acting Inspector-General of Police, Bombay.

=== Order of Saint Michael and Saint George ===
==== Knight Grand Cross of the Order of St Michael and St George (GCMG) ====
- The Honourable Sir Francis Henry Dillon Bell, KC, KCMG, Attorney-General and Leader of the Legislative Council, Dominion of New Zealand.
- His Excellency the Right Honourable Sir Esme William Howard, KCB, KCMG, CVO, His Majesty's Ambassador Extraordinary & Plenipotentiary to His Majesty the King of Spain.
- The Right Honourable Sir Horace George Montagu Rumbold, Bt, KCMG, MVO, His Majesty's High Commissioner at Constantinople.

==== Knight Commander of the Order of St Michael and St George (KCMG) ====
- Colonel Sir Samuel Herbert Wilson, KBE, CB, CMG, Governor & Commander-in-Chief of the Colony of Trinidad & Tobago.
- The Honourable Arthur Robinson, CMG, Attorney-General & Solicitor-General, Minister in charge of the development of the Morwell Brown Coal Resources, and Leader of the Legislative Council, State of Victoria.
- The Honourable Charles George Smith, Nominated Member of the Senate of the Union of South Africa, in recognition of his public services.
- Robert Windham Graves, CMG, OBE, until recently Financial Adviser to His Majesty's High Commissioner at Constantinople.
- Ernest Colville Collins Wilton, CMG, until recently His Majesty's Envoy Extraordinary & Minister Plenipotentiary to the Republics of Estonia and Latvia.

==== Companion of the Order of St Michael and St George (CMG) ====
- Captain Oswald Herbert Campbell Balfour, The King's Royal Rifle Corps, for services as Personal Secretary to the Governor General of Canada.
- Henry Ebenezer Barff, Warden and Registrar of the University of Sydney in the State of New South Wales.
- Arthur Powlett Blunt, Acting Commissioner of Weihaiwei.
- The Honourable Hal Pateshall Colebatch, Minister for Education & Health, Minister for Justice, and Minister for the North West, State of Western Australia.
- Christian Ludolph Neethling Felling, General Manager of the Uganda Railway, for services as Chief Assistant to the General Manager of Railways & Harbours, Union of South Africa.
- The Honourable John Lewis, Member of the Legislative Council of the State of South Australia.
- Terence Charles Macnaghten, CBE, Assistant Secretary in the Colonial Office, and Vice-Chairman of the Oversea Settlement Committee.
- Edward Newman, for many years Member of the House of Representatives of the Dominion of New Zealand: author of the movement resulting in the "New Zealand Sheepowners' Acknowledgment of Debt to British Seamen Fund".
- Arthur Meek Pountney, CBE, Financial Adviser, Straits Settlements and Federated Malay States.
- Captain William Blakeney Stanley, MBE, Provincial Commissioner in the Protectorate of Sierra Leone.
- Colonel Robert Ward Tate, CBE, lately Administrator of Western Samoa.
- Clare Aveling Wiggins, Principal Medical Officer, Uganda Protectorate.
- Major Hubert Winthrop Young, DSO, Middle East Department, Colonial Office
- Howard William Kennard, Counsellor of His Majesty's Embassy at Rome.
- Gerald Hyde Villiers, a Counsellor in the Foreign Office.
- Eric Graham Forbes Adam, a First Secretary in the Foreign Office.
- Richard Edward Kimens, Commercial Secretary at His Majesty's Legation at Warsaw.

=== Order of the Indian Empire ===
==== Knight Grand Commander of the Order of the Indian Empire (GCIE) ====
- Sir Spencer Harcourt Butler, KCSI, Governor of the United Provinces of Agra and Oudh.

==== Knight Commander of the Order of the Indian Empire (KCIE) ====
- His Highness Maharaja Tashi Namgyal, CIE, Maharaja of Sikkim.
- Lieutenant Meherban Chintamanrao Dhundirav, alias Appasaheb Patwardhan, Chief of Sangli, Bombay.
- Major-General Gerald Godfray Giffard, CSI, Indian Medical Service, Surgeon General with the Government of Madras.
- Major Nawab Malik Khuda Bakhsh Khan, Tiwana, CIE, OBE, Extra-Judicial Assistant Commissioner in the Punjab, and Revenue Member, Council of Regency, Bahawalpur State, Punjab.

==== Companion of the Order of the Indian Empire (CIE) ====
- Harry Tonkinson, Indian Civil Service, Joint Secretary to the Government of India, Home Department.
- M.R.Ry. Chetput Pattabhirama Ayyar Ramaswami Ayyar Avargal, Advocate-General, Madras.
- Arthur Edward Nelson, OBE, Indian Civil Service, Chief Secretary to Government, Central Provinces.
- Alexander Shirley Montgomery, Chief Engineer and Secretary to Government, Punjab Public Works Department, Buildings & Roads Branch.
- Kunwar Jagdish Prasad, OBE, Indian Civil Service, Educational Secretary to Government, United Provinces.
- Nelson Annandale, DSc, Director, Zoological Survey of India.
- Lieutenant-Colonel Andrew Thomas Gage, Indian Medical Service, Superintendent of the Royal Botanical Gardens, Calcutta, and Director, Botanical Survey of India, Bengal.
- Lieutenant-Colonel John Philip Cameron, Indian Medical Service, Inspector-General of Prisons, Madras.
- Lieutenant-Colonel Charles Eckford Luard, Indian Army, Political Agent in Bhopal, Central India.
- Frederick Alexander Leete, Chief Conservator of Forests, Burma.
- Lieutenant-Colonel Henry Ross, OBE, Indian Medical Service.
- Captain Victor Felix Gamble, Private Secretary to His Excellency the Governor of the United Provinces.
- Lieutenant-Colonel Alfred Hooton, Indian Medical Service, Agency Surgeon, Kathiawar, Bombay.
- Arnold Albert Musto, Executive Engineer, Public Works Department, Bombay.
- Abdur Raheem, Merchant and Landholder Bengal.
- John Arthur Jones, Editor, Statesman, Calcutta, Bengal.
- The Reverend Canon Edward Guilford, OBE, Church Missionary Society, Tarn Taran, Amritsar District, Punjab.
- Pringle Kennedy, Pleader, Bihar & Orissa.
- Major Henry Benedict Fox, VD, Chairman, Surma Valley Branch, Indian Tea Association, Assam.
- U Po Tha, OBE, Head Broker, Steel Brothers, Member of the Local Legislative Council and Honorary Magistrate, Burma.
- Captain Albert Gottlieb Puech, OBE, VD, late Assistant Recruiting Officer, Meerut & Delhi Divisions, and Hissar & Gurgaon Districts, United Provinces and Punjab.
- Keshab Chandra Roy, Director, Associated Press of India.
- Naoroji Bapooji Saklatwala, of Messrs. Tata & Sons, Ltd., Bombay.
- William Stantiall, Secretary, Public Works Department, India Office.

=== Royal Victorian Order ===
==== Knight Grand Cross of the Royal Victorian Order (GCVO) ====
- John George, Duke of Atholl, KT, CB, DSO, MVO.
- Lieutenant-General Sir Robert Stephenson Smyth Baden-Powell, Bt, KCB, KCVO.

==== Knight Commander of the Royal Victorian Order (KCVO) ====
- Sir Herbert James Greedy, KCB, CVO.
- Sir William Jameson Soulsby, CB, CIE, CVO.
- Sir Milsom Rees, CVO.
- Vice-Admiral Henry Bertram Pelly, CB, MVO.
- Gerald Francis Talbot, CMG, OBE. (Dated 14 December 1922).

==== Commander of the Royal Victorian Order (CVO) ====
- Sir Frank Baines, CBE, MVO.
- Sir Harry Baldwin.
- Lieutenant-Colonel Ronald Waterhouse, CB, CMG. (Dated 17 December 1922).
- Edward Denny Bacon, MVO. (Dated 20 December 1922).
- Lieutenant-Colonel William Angel Scott, MVO.
- Arthur John Eagleston.
- Frank William Hunt.
- Major William Clive Hussey.

==== Member of the Royal Victorian Order, 5th class (MVO) ====
- Commissioned Gunner David Russell Gordon, Royal Navy. (Dated 5 August 1922).
- Arthur Preedy.
- William Shackleton.
- Commissioned Boatswain William Staples, Royal Navy. (Dated 5 August 1922).
- Commissioned Gunner James Wood, Royal Navy. (Dated 5 August 1922).

=== Order of the British Empire ===
==== Knight Grand Cross of the Order of the British Empire (GBE) ====
Military Division

Royal Navy

- Admiral Sir Reginald Godfrey Otway Tupper, KCB, CVO.

Army

- Lieutenant-General Sir Charles Harington Harington, KCB, DSO.

==== Knight Commander of the Order of the British Empire (KBE) ====
Military Division

Royal Navy

- Admiral William Fane De Salis, MVO. (Dated 30 December 1922).
- Vice-Admiral Sir Ernest Frederick Augustus Gaunt, KCB, CMG.

Army

- Major-General Sir Hugh Sandham Jeudwine, KCB.
- Major-General Sir Edward Peter Strickland, KCB, CMG, DSO. (Colonel, The Norfolk Regiment).
- Major-General Louis Ridley Vaughan, CB, DSO, Indian Army. (Dated 30 December 1922).
- Colonel (Honorary Brigadier-General) James Gilbert Shaw Mellor, CB, CMG, KC, Reserve of Officers.
- Colonel (Temporary Colonel Commandant) Percy Cyriac Burrell Skinner, CB, CMG, DSO.

Civil Division

- Charles Arthur Walsh.
- Colonel Ormonde de l'Epee Winter, CB, CMG, DSO.
- John Oliver Wardrop, CMG, His Majesty's Consul-General at Strasbourg.
- Raja Sikandar Khan, CIE, Raja of Nagar, Gilgit Agency, Kashmir.
- Mager Frederic Gauntlett, CIE, CBE, Indian Civil Service, Auditor-General.
- Donald Charles Cameron, CMG, Chief Secretary to Government, Nigeria.
- Harry Graumann, of Johannesburg, Member of the House of Assembly, Union of South Africa. In recognition of his public services.
- John Harrison, Chairman of the Board of Control, Matraville Garden Village for Disabled Soldiers, Sydney, Commonwealth of Australia.
- Frederick Seton James, CMG, Colonial Secretary of the Straits Settlements.
- David Orme Masson, CBE, DSc, Professor of Chemistry in the University of Melbourne. In recognition of his public services.

==== Commander of the Order of the British Empire (CBE) ====
Military Division

Royal Navy

- Captain Cecil Dacre Staveley Raikes.
- Captain Robert Gordon Douglas Dewar.
- Captain Henry Evans Freke Aylmer. (Dated 30 December 1922).
- Engineer-Captain George William Baldwin. (Dated 30 December 1922).
- Paymaster-Captain John Edward Jones. (Dated 30 December 1922).
- Colonel Second Commandant Reginald Hallward Morgan, Royal Marine Light Infantry.

Army

- Temporary Lieutenant-Colonel Nevill Anderson, OBE, General List.
- Major George Joseph Ball, OBE, Reserve of Officers, Royal Engineers.
- Major & Brevet Lieutenant-Colonel Colin Burton, DSO, Royal Army Service Corps.
- Lieutenant-Colonel Edward Lacy Challenor, CB, CMG, DSO, The Leicestershire Regiment.
- Lieutenant-Colonel & Brevet Colonel James Graham Chaplin, DSO, The Cameronians.
- Lieutenant-Colonel Charles Henry Kemble Chauncy, 124th Baluchistan Infantry, Indian Army. (Dated 30 December 1922).
- Lieutenant-Colonel William John Patrick Adye-Curran, OBE, Royal Army Medical Corps.
- Colonel Warburton Edward Davies, CMG, DSO.
- Major & Brevet Lieutenant-Colonel Sir Francis Napier Elphinstone-Dalrymple, Bt, DSO, Royal Artillery.
- Lieutenant-Colonel & Brevet Colonel Charles Newenham French, CMG, The Hampshire Regiment.
- Colonel Charles Augustus Frederick Hocken, Indian Army. (Dated 30 December 1922).
- Major & Brevet Lieutenant-Colonel John Frederic Roundel Hope, DSO, The King's Royal Rifle Corps.
- Lieutenant-Colonel (Temporary Colonel) Frederic Arthur Iles, DSO, Royal Corps of Signals.
- Captain Hugh Mowbray Meyler, DSO, MC, The Border Regiment.
- Lieutenant-Colonel George de la Poer Beresford Pakenham, CMG, DSO, The Border Regiment.
- Major & Brevet Lieutenant-Colonel Edward Albert Porch, CIE, MC, Supply & Transport Corps, Indian Army. (Dated 30 December 1922).
- Major Thomas Geoffrey Ruttledge, OBE, MC, The Green Howards.
- Lieutenant-Colonel Bryan Henry Chetwynd-Stapylton, The Cheshire Regiment.
- Lieutenant-Colonel Arthur Cornish Jeremie Stevens, DSO, Royal Engineers.
- Lieutenant-Colonel Harold William Puzey Stokes, DSO, Royal Army Service Corps.
- Lieutenant-Colonel William John Bell Tweedie, CMG, Extra-Regimentally Employed List.
- Colonel George Walker, DSO.
- Lieutenant-Colonel (Honorary Colonel) Walter Ward, VD, Nilgiri Malabar Battalion, Auxiliary Force, India. (Dated 30 December 1922).
- Lieutenant-Colonel Richard Henry George Wilson, The Lincolnshire Regiment.

Civil Division

- Brigadier-General Netterville Guy Barron, CMG, DSO.
- Julius Bishop, Lieutenant Bailiff of Guernsey. (Dated 30 December 1922).
- Richard Francis Raleigh Cruise.
- Captain William Young Darling, MC.
- Robert Dunlop.
- Lieutenant-Colonel Frank Rogers Durham, OBE, MC, Director of Works, Imperial War Graves Commission. (Dated 30 December 1922).
- Captain William Jocelyn Ian Fraser. Chairman, St. Dunstan's Committee. (Dated 30 December 1922).
- Colonel Frederick Henry Wickham Guard, CMG, DSO.
- George Bennett Heard.
- Arthur Francis Hemming.
- Lieutenant-Colonel Percy Robert Laurie, DSO, Deputy Assistant Commissioner, Metropolitan Police. (Dated 30 December 1922).
- Patrick Aloysius Marrinan.
- Henry John Moore.
- Pryce Peacock, LRCSI.
- Thomas Bailey Pearson, Director of Audit, Audit Office. (Dated 30 December 1922).
- Francis William Rawlinson, FRGS, Secretary to the Royal Merchant Seamen's Orphanage. (Dated 30 December 1922).
- Colonel Charles Walker Scott, CMG, DSO, Disposal Commissioner in India. (Dated 30 December 1922).
- Frank Edward Smith, OBE, FRS, Director of Scientific Research, Admiralty. (Dated 30 December 1922).
- Louis Herbert Hartland Swann, National Savings Committee. (Dated 30 December 1922).
- James Wilbond.
- Alexander Kemp Wright, Manager of The Royal Bank of Scotland; Deputy Chairman of Scottish Savings Committee. (Dated 30 December 1922).
- Harry Owen Chalkley, Commercial Secretary (Grade 1) at His Majesty's Legation at Buenos Ayres.
- Harry Leslie Sherwood, recently Inspector-General of His Majesty's Consulates.
- Frederick Lewisohn, Indian Civil Service, Chief Secretary to the Government of Burma.
- Herbert William Emerson, Deputy Commissioner of Multan.
- Valentine Patrick Terrell Vivian, OBE, Punjab Police.
- Girja Shankar Bajpai, Indian Civil Service.
- Diwan Bahadur Kashinath Ramchandra Godbole, President, District Local Board, Poona, and Member of the Bombay Legislative Council, Bombay.
- Bernard Humphrey Bell, President, Court of Appeal, Iraq.
- Arthur Ernest Booty, lately Treasurer of the Uganda Protectorate.
- Henry Curwen, MB, lately Principal Medical Officer, Zanzibar Protectorate.
- John William Evans, DSc, LLB, FRS, Representative of the Colonies and Protectorates administered by the Secretary of State for the Colonies on the Governing Body of the Imperial Mineral Resources Bureau.
- Frederick William Fraser, Government Secretary, the State of North Borneo.
- John Thomas Gosling, lately Officiating Treasurer and Member of the Legislative Council of the Colony of Kenya.
- Edwin Richard Hallifax, OBE, Secretary for Chinese Affairs, Colony of Hong Kong.
- William George John Hill, Assistant Superintendent, Staff, Railways & Harbours, Union of South Africa.
- John Hampden King, Immigration Agent-General and Acting Colonial Secretary of the Colony of British Guiana.
- Edward Daniel Laborde, ISO, lately Treasurer of Grenada.
- William Barr Montgomery, OBE, Permanent Head of the Customs Department, Dominion of New Zealand.
- William McNiven Muat, MB, Senior Medical Officer, Weihaiwei.
- Henry Percy Pickerill, MD, in recognition of valuable services since the War in connection with facial and jaw operations on wounded soldiers in the Dominion of New Zealand.
- Bernard Edward Howard Tripp, MBE, Representative of New Zealand at the Red Cross Conference at Geneva, 1921.
- Leo Weinthal, OBE, for services to South Africans in London.

==== Officer of the Order of the British Empire (OBE) ====
Military Division

Royal Navy

- Commander Vincent Byrne Cardwell.
- Lieutenant-Commander Harold Tom Baillie Grohman, DSO.
- Major & Brevet Lieutenant-Colonel George Carpenter, DSC, Royal Marine Light Infantry.
- Major Cecil Edward Sykes-Wright, Royal Marine Light Infantry.

Army

- Captain Cecil Horace Reginald Barnes, 3rd (Militia) Battalion, The Wiltshire Regiment.
- Temporary Major Alfred Howard Barrett, General List.
- Major Geoffrey Ambrose Phillipps Brown, Royal Engineers.
- Major & Brevet Lieutenant-Colonel Andrew Duncan Montague Browne, DSO, The King's Own Royal Regiment.
- Assistant Commissary of Ordnance & Captain James Herbert Browne, Royal Army Ordnance Corps.
- Captain Edgar Alan Corner, The Hampshire Regiment.
- Captain George Conway Dobb, Royal Field Artillery.
- Captain John McLeod Down, The Wiltshire Regiment.
- Lieutenant John Francis Eastwood, Reserve of Officers, Grenadier Guards.
- Major & Brevet Lieutenant-Colonel Thomas Otho FitzGerald, MC, The King's Own Royal Regiment, Commanding 3rd Battalion, The King's African Rifles. (Dated 30 December 1922).
- Major Gordon Flemming, MC, Reserve of Officers, The Gordon Highlanders.
- Captain Robert Michael Grazebrook, MC, The Gloucestershire Regiment.
- Major Arthur Crosby Halahan, The Essex Regiment.
- Major & Brevet Lieutenant-Colonel Robert Henry Haseldine, DSO, The King's Regiment.
- Captain Killingworth Michael Fentham Hedges, DSO, Royal Army Service Corps.
- Major Frank Harley James, MC, 104th Rifles, Indian Army. (Dated 30 December 1922).
- Major Robert Johnston, DSO, 2nd Lancers, Indian Army. (Dated 30 December 1922).
- Lieutenant Campbell Kelly, MC, MM, Royal Garrison Artillery.
- Major William Clarke Kirkwood, 97th Infantry, Indian Army. (Dated 30 December 1922).
- Captain & Brevet Major Hubert Stanley Kreyer, DSO, The Green Howards.
- Major & Brevet Lieutenant-Colonel Reginald Tilson Lee, CMG, DSO, The Queen's Royal Regiment.
- Temporary Captain Frank Douglas Martin, The Sherwood Foresters.
- Temporary Lieutenant-Colonel James Clymo Milton, MBE, General List.
- Captain Richard Neville Shute Morse, The North Staffordshire Regiment.
- Temporary Major John Herbert Neville, General List.
- Temporary Lieutenant John Whitfield Elford Poynting, The King's Own Scottish Borderers.
- Major William Brooke Purdon, DSO, MC, MB, Royal Army Medical Corps.
- Captain & Brevet Major Hamlet Lewthwaite Riley, DSO, The Rifle Brigade.
- Lieutenant (Acting Captain) John Herbert Robins, Yorkshire Dragoons Yeomanry, attached Royal Corps of Signals.
- Major John Lintorn Shore, DSO, The Cheshire Regiment.
- Major Henry Thompson Stack, MB, Royal Army Medical Corps.
- Captain Ian MacAlister Stewart, MC, The Argyll & Sutherland Highlanders.
- Temporary Captain (Acting Major) James Dudley Sturrock, Royal Army Service Corps.
- Captain Edwin Arthur Telford, MC, Corps of Military Accountants.
- Lieutenant Anthony O'Brien Traill, The Duke of Wellington's Regiment, attached Tank Corps.
- Captain (DO) Albert Harry Wales, MC, Royal Artillery.

Royal Air Force

- Squadron Leader Albert James Butler, MC, AFC.
- Squadron Leader Harry George Smart, DFC. (Dated 30 December 1922).

Civil Division

- Lieutenant The Honourable Gerald Ralph Desmond Browne.
- William Albert Egan.
- William Henry Eggett, ISO, Accountant, Colonial Office. (Dated 30 December 1922).
- John Foster.
- John Thomas Heggart.
- Captain The Honourable Henry Edmund FitzAlan-Howard.
- Eric Pearl Hyem.
- Lieutenant William Howard Kerr.
- Major John Victor Kershaw, DSO.
- George McConkey.
- James Andrew McDonnell.
- James Edward McGarry.
- Hugh Morrison Metcalfe.
- Captain Cornelius Banahan O'Beirne.
- Francis John Harris Palmer, Member of the Liquidation Board. (Dated 30 December 1922).
- Captain John Martin Regan.
- Captain Bertram Benjamin Ridgwell Roberson.
- James Francis Ronca, MBE, Principal Staff Clerk, Board of Trade. (Dated 30 December 1922).
- Walter Round, Local Auditor (Chester), War Office. (Dated 30 December 1922).
- John Russell.
- Lieutenant-Colonel Stuart Forbes Sharp, MC.
- James William Stafford, MBE, Assistant Passport Officer, Foreign Office. (Dated 30 December 1922).
- Lieutenant Richard Straker, MC.
- Captain Henry Neville Grylls Watson, DSO.
- William Edward Young, MBE, Commandant, Metropolitan Special Constabulary. (Dated 30 December 1922).
- Frank Savery, His Majesty's Consul at Warsaw.
- Frederick Watson, His Majesty's Consul at New York.
- Herbert Kershaw, Commercial Secretary (Grade 2) at His Majesty's Legation at Stockholm.
- Craven Howell Walker, MBE, His Majesty's Consul for Western Ethiopia.
- Major Michael Courtney, ISO, Indian Medical Department; Superintendent, Central Jail, Montgomery, Punjab.
- George Ernest Fawcus, Indian Educational Service, Director of Public Instruction, Bihar & Orissa.
- Rai Bahadur Debendra Nath Chaudhri, Pleader, Central Provinces.
- Doctor David Brainard Spooner, Deputy Director-General of Archaeology in India.
- John Elliot Armstrong, Deputy Inspector-General of Police. (On special duty in connection with Munitions cases), Bengal.
- Lieutenant-Colonel Samuel Christian Sinclair, MBE, Superintendent of Post Offices.
- Khan Bahadur Mohamed Abdul Rahman Khan, Commanding Bahawalpur State Forces, Bahawalpur, Punjab.
- Major William Arthur MacDonell Garstin, Deputy Commissioner, Bannu, North-West Frontier Province.
- Rai Bahadur Pandit Brijmohan Nath Zutshi, President, Council of Regency, Rewa, Central India.
- Francis Colomb Crawford, Deputy Director-General of Police, Criminal Investigation Department, His Exalted Highness the Nizam's Government, Hyderabad. (Deccan).
- Mirza Mahomed Ismail, Private Secretary to His Highness the Maharaja of Mysore.
- Major Norman Napier Evelyn Bray, MC, Political Department, India Office.
- Ronald Sinclair, MBE, Punjab Police.
- John Adams, Chairman of the Orange Free State Land Board, Union of South Africa.
- Major George Croker Bayly, lately Commissioner of the Nicosia District, and Member of the Legislative Council, Island of Cyprus.
- Emmanuel Joseph Peter Brown, Member of the Legislative Council of the Gold Coast Colony.
- Arthur Ernest Charter, Office of the Administrator of the Transvaal, Union of South Africa.
- The Honourable Charles Cecil Farquharson Dundas, Senior Commissioner, Administrative Department, Tanganyika Territory.
- Shirley Eales, Chief Clerk in the Office of the High Commissioner for South Africa.
- George Finnimore, Inspector of Civil Gaols, Iraq.
- William Henry Leader Foster, MA, Head Master of the Clyde Quay Primary School, Wellington, Dominion of New Zealand.
- Major Charles Hugh Gilson, DSO, Assistant Commissioner in charge of the Swaziland Police Force, South Africa.
- William Hudson, MC, Postmaster General, Palestine.
- John Emery Casement Lawrie, of Johannesburg, Union of South Africa, in recognition of his public services.
- Charles Edgar Littledale, MC, Commandant of Police, Arbil, Iraq.
- Gladys Pott, for services on the Executive of the Society for the Oversea Settlement of British Women.
- Quah Beng Kee, of Penang, Straits Settlements, in recognition of his public services.
- Herbert Charles Ransom, MBE, Deputy Head of the General Department, Office of the Crown Agents for the Colonies.
- Major Henry Rayne, MBE, MC, District Commissioner in Somaliland.
- George Whitfield Smith, Commissioner and Judge, Turks & Caicos Islands.
- Herbert Cecil Stiebel, Senior Commissioner, Administrative Department, Tanganyika Territory.
- Herbert Torrance, MB, Medical Missionary, Scottish Hospital, Tiberias, for valuable services to the people of Palestine.
- Henry William Watlington, Member of the House of Assembly of the Bermudas or Somers Islands.

==== Member of the Order of the British Empire (MBE) ====
Military Division

Royal Navy

- Chief Officer of Coast Guard Alfred Henry Futter.
- Royal Marine Gunner Ernest George Thornton.

Army

- No.7717006 Regimental Sergeant-Major Sidney William Bailey, Military Provost Staff Corps.
- Lieutenant Harry Bright, The East Yorkshire Regiment.
- Lieutenant Harold Browne, The Calcutta Scottish, Auxiliary Force, India. (Dated 30 December 1922).
- Lieutenant John Gordon Campbell, MC, The Border Regiment.
- Lieutenant William Geoffrey Cass, The Buffs.
- Lieutenant Percy Edgar Eyres Chappell, DCM, The Somerset Light Infantry.
- No.721003 Garrison Sergeant-Major Patrick Cullinan, DCM, Garrison Staff.
- No.5180 Garrison Sergeant-Major Vivian Hugh Stuart Davenport, MC, DCM, Garrison Staff.
- Lieutenant Harold Alban Davies, MC, The Royal Welch Fusiliers.
- Temporary Lieutenant (Temporary Captain) Charles Bertram De La Mare, Tank Corps.
- Lieutenant Lionel Chasemore Gates, MC, The Lincolnshire Regiment.
- Temporary Lieutenant Willie Herbert Stevens Gowen, Royal Army Service Corps.
- Lieutenant Francis Gordon Griffith, The North-Western Railway Regiment, Auxiliary Force, India. (Dated 30 December 1922).
- Temporary Captain Ernest Howard Griggs, General List.
- Lieutenant Henry Ernest Howse, The Prince of Wales's Volunteers.
- Assistant Commissary & Lieutenant Henry Walter Innes, Military Works Services, India. (Dated 30 December 1922).
- Lieutenant Simon Fraser McKay, The Leicestershire Regiment.
- Lieutenant Henry Walter Terrell Marden, The Dorsetshire Regiment.
- Lieutenant Conrad Richard Cresswell Marsh, The King's Shropshire Light Infantry.
- Lieutenant Harold Arthur Edwin Matthews, The Dorsetshire Regiment.
- Lieutenant Edward Alexander Packe, DFC, The Oxfordshire & Buckinghamshire Light Infantry.
- Temporary Lieutenant (Acting Captain) William Dex Lea Rayner, Royal Engineers, attached Royal Corps of Signals.
- Lieutenant Frederick Spicer, MC, The Bedfordshire and Hertfordshire Regiment.
- Lieutenant Edward Francis Twining, The Worcestershire Regiment.
- No.5562022 Garrison Quartermaster-Sergeant John Richard Wheeler, The Wiltshire Regiment & Garrison Staff.
- Captain Harry Wright, MC, The Gordon Highlanders.

Royal Air Force

- Flight Lieutenant Horace George Brown.
- Flight Lieutenant Ian Cullen, AFC. (Dated 30 December 1922).
- Flight Lieutenant Wesley Howard Oakey.
- Flying Officer Frederick Robert Wynne. (Dated 30 December 1922).
- No.402325 Sergeant-Major 1st Class Percy John Jackson.

Civil Division

- Major Herbert Thompson Argent, TD, late Assistant Controller, the Contract Department, Disposal & Liquidation Commission. (Dated 30 December 1922).
- Philip Attwood Andrew Barclay, MA, FEIS, JP, Glasgow District Delegate, the Scottish Savings Committee. (Dated 30 December 1922).
- James Byrne.
- Major Hallawell Carew, MC.
- Captain Percy Walter Henry Carpenter.
- Stephen Clifford.
- Patrick Dillon.
- John Stephen Doherty.
- Captain Richard Eagle, Secretary, Works Department, Imperial War Graves Commission. (Dated 30 December 1922).
- John Greally.
- Harry Heath, Acting Deputy Accounts Officer, Admiralty. (Dated 30 December 1922).
- Thomas Hunter Herriot.
- Leslie Holbrook Kitton, MC.
- Frank Knight.
- Edward Harry Lawes.
- Leslie Keith Lockhart, MC.
- Alfred William Jarvis May, Supervisor of Copying, Colonial Office. (Dated 30 December 1922).
- Timothy MacCarthy.
- Jeremiah McCarthy.
- William McGurk.
- William Jackson Morton, Commandant, Metropolitan Special Constabulary. (Dated 30 December 1922).
- William Noble.
- Charles William Masters Paterson, Commandant, Metropolitan Special Constabulary Reserve. (Dated 30 December 1922).
- Ernest Matthew Pearson, Senior Examiner, Passport Office, Foreign Office. (Dated 30 December 1922).
- Thomas Hedley Phillips, Commandant, Metropolitan Special Constabulary. (Dated 30 December 1922).
- James Gordon Singer, North East District Delegate to the Scottish Savings Committee. (Dated 30 December 1922).
- James Sweeney.
- Charles Henry Wilkins.
- Ernest Edward Wilkinson, Clerk for Legal Instruments, Colonial Office. (Dated 30 December 1922).
- Violet Napier Bell, Member of the Foreign Office Section at the Washington Conference.
- William Alphonse Franck, His Majesty's Vice-Consul at Catania.
- Bernard Ponsonby Sullivan, Commercial Secretary (Grade 3) at His Majesty's Embassy at Brussels.
- Arthur Lister Compton Hands, Chief Clerk to the Government and Clerk to the Executive Council, Island of Saint Helena.
- Ernest Arthur Harris, Superintendent, Mechanical Transport, Ministry of Communications & Works, Iraq.
- Villiers Hart de Keating, Editor of the Mauritius News.
- Helen Louise Iles, Acting Matron, New General Hospital, Baghdad, Iraq.
- Leslie Thomas Pollard, Registrar, Secretariat of the High Commissioner for Iraq.
- Moisis George Zarifi, Revenue Inspector, Treasury Department, Island of Cyprus.

=== Medal of the Order of the British Empire ===
Dated 28 December 1922, unless otherwise stated:

For Meritorious Service
Military Division

Army

- No.2310221 Signalman Herbert Botting, Royal Corps of Signals.
- No.7245641 Staff Sergeant Frederick Albert Johnson, Royal Army Medical Corps.
- No.5241057 Private Harry Edward Jones, The Worcestershire Regiment.
- No.6837103 Company Sergeant-Major John Henry Sidney Francis, DCM, MM, The King's Royal Rifle Corps.
- No.7870859 Private George Holmes, Tank Corps.
- No.M/16760 Private (Acting Lance-Corporal) Charles Freeman, Royal Army Service Corps.
- No.M/18728 Private (Acting Sergeant) Charles Inions, Royal Army Service Corps.
- No.M/14459 Corporal (Acting Sergeant) Francis James McCann, Royal Army Service Corps.
- No.M/20508 Private (Acting Lance-Corporal) Reginald Arthur Newman, Royal Army Service Corps.
- No.M/20178 Private William Henry George Sedgmond, Royal Army Service Corps.
- No.1853394 Sergeant (Acting Company Sergeant-Major) Walter Sidney Wallis, Postal Section, Royal Engineers.

Royal Air Force

- No.1287 Flight Sergeant James Kemp Tough.
- No.334286 Sergeant Frank Lowry. (Dated 30 December 1922).
- No.60056 Corporal (Acting-Sergeant) Herbert Sydney Allen. (Dated 30 December 1922).
- No.331463 Corporal William Victor James Bancroft. (Dated 30 December 1922).
- No.341282 Corporal Harry Bowick. (Dated 30 December 1922).

Civil Division

- James Patrick Feeney.
- William George Higbee.
- Patrick Lawrence Hollywood.
- Charles Joseph Keeney.
- John Loughrey.
- Denis Mahon.
- Valentine Mannion.
- Patrick McDonagh.
- Daniel McGrath.
- William Mulholland.
- Cornelius O'Sullivan.
- Thomas Power.
- Timothy Reddin.
- John Began, DCM.
- Johnston Walmsley.

For Gallantry
Civil Division

- Albert Waterfield, Park-keeper, Richmond Park. (Dated 30 December 1922)

=== Kaisar-i-Hind Medal ===
First Class, for Public Services in India

- Dr. Robert Harper, Medical Missionary of the American Baptist Mission, Burma.
- M.R.Ry. Diwan Bahadur Raghupati Venkataratnam Nayudu Garu, lately Principal of the Raja's College, Pithapuram, Madras.
- Khan Bahadur Kavasji Jamshedji Petigara, Superintendent of Police, Bombay.
- Rani Shri Kamribai, Rani Saheba of Jasdan, Bombay.
- Sister Blanche Annie, Sister in charge of Nursing, Presidency General Hospital, Bengal.
- Jessie Hopkins, United Provinces.
- The Reverend William Scott, Scotch Mission, Sialkot, Punjab.
- Nasarwanji Nowroji Parakh, LRFPS (Glas.), LSA, Medical Practitioner and Member of the Local Legislative Council, Burma.
- Isabel Kerr, Lady Doctor in charge of the Leper Home at Dichpalli, Hyderabad. (Deccan).
- The Reverend George William Sawday, Wesleyan Mission, Mysore.

=== Air Force Cross (AFC) ===
- Flight Lieutenant Edward Rodolph Clement Scholefield, DCM.

Bar to the Air Force Cross

- Flight Lieutenant Thomas Edward Barham Howe, AFC.

=== Air Force Medal (AFM) ===
- 314986 Sergeant William Charles Whitfield.

=== King's Police Medal (KPM) ===
England & Wales

Police

- Victor Foulcrand Bosanquet, Chief Constable, Monmouthshire Constabulary.
- William Scott, Chief Constable, South Shields Borough Police.
- Frederick Rodgers, Superintendent & Deputy Chief Constable, Nottinghamshire Constabulary.
- Frederic James Andrew, Superintendent, Derbyshire Constabulary.
- Hector Daniel Macleod, Superintendent, Northamptonshire Constabulary.
- John Carr, Chief Superintendent, Newcastle upon Tyne City Police.
- Richard John Halford, Superintendent, City of London Police.
- Thomas Tate, Sergeant, Lancashire Constabulary.
- Charles Allen, Acting Sergeant, City of London Police.
- Charles Martin, Detective Constable, Metropolitan Police.
- Percy McDouall, Detective Constable, Metropolitan Police.
- Cecil Sayer, Detective Constable, Metropolitan Police.
- Walter Bush, Constable, Metropolitan Police.
- Frederick Carter, Constable, Metropolitan Police.
- James Duff, Constable, Metropolitan Police.
- Edward Geer, Constable, Metropolitan Police.
- John Hayes, Constable, Metropolitan Police.
- Harry Hutchings, Constable, Metropolitan Police.
- Walter March, Constable, Metropolitan Police.
- George Blake, Constable, Buckinghamshire Constabulary.
- James Benstead, Constable, Liverpool City Police.
- William Handley, Constable, Liverpool City Police.
- Robert Alfred Corlett, Constable, Manchester City Police.
- John Thomas Johnson, Constable, Sheffield City Police.

Fire Brigades

- Smollett Montgomerie Eddington, Chief Officer of the Tottenham Fire Brigade.
- Alfred Edward Sibley, Senior Superintendent, London Fire Brigade.
- Raymond John Law, Fireman, Tottenham Fire Brigade.
- William Peachey, Fireman, Tottenham Fire Brigade.

Scotland

- James Semple, Inspector, Glasgow City Police Force.
- Lachlan McDonald, Detective Lieutenant, Glasgow City Police Force.
- Robert Breakenridge, Constable, Lanarkshire Constabulary.
- David Gray, Constable, Lanarkshire Constabulary.
- Alexander McKay, Constable, Lanarkshire Constabulary.
- John Robinson, Constable, Lanarkshire Constabulary.

Ireland

Police

- Thomas James Allen, late District Inspector, Royal Irish Constabulary, now Royal Ulster Constabulary.
- Henry Connor, late District Inspector, Royal Irish Constabulary, now Royal Ulster Constabulary.
- Richard Robert Heggart, late District Inspector, Royal Irish Constabulary, now Royal Ulster Constabulary.
- Johnston Walmsley, late Sergeant, Royal Irish Constabulary, now Royal Ulster Constabulary.
- Thomas McClay, Platoon Commander, Class "A", Ulster Special Constabulary.

Fire Brigades

- James Stafford, Chief Officer, Belfast Fire Brigade.

India

- Arnold Jesse King, Assistant Superintendent, Madras Police.
- Karumathil Krishna Paniker, Subadar, Madras Police.
- Thondikulam Seshan Patter Ramanathan Ayyar, Acting Inspector, Madras Police.
- Vellang Madathil Appu Nayar, Sub-Inspector, Madras Police.
- Kinattinkara Karunakaran Nayar, Sub Inspector, Madras Police.
- Vellat Karunakara Menon, Sub-Inspector, Madras Police.
- Vengalil Krishna Menon, Sub-Inspector, Madras Police.
- Kunnant Hodiyil Syedu, Head Constable, Madras Police.
- Rishiyur Srinivasa Ayyar Krishnaswami Ayyar, Deputy Superintendent, Madras Police.
- Khan Bahadur Villupuram Ghulam Ali Muhammad Khan, Deputy Superintendent, Madras Police.
- Michael A. O'Gorman, Assistant Superintendent, Bombay Police.
- Kalekhan Hamidkhan, Head Constable, Second Grade, & Acting Sub-Inspector, Bombay Police.
- Bapu Sitaram Sawant, Constable, Bombay Police.
- Wahidbux Allahjiwayo, Camel Constable, Bombay Police.
- Sundersingh Kalusingh, Armed Jamadar, Bombay Police.
- Syed Mahomed Syed Masitali, Constable, Bombay Police.
- Daniel Healy, District Superintendent, Bombay Police.
- John Court Curry, District Superintendent, Bombay Police.
- Tahilram Dharamdas Vasvani, Inspector, Acting as Deputy Superintendent, Bombay Police.
- Harold Maitland Haslehurst, MBE, District Superintendent, Bombay Police.
- Keramat Shah, Constable, Bengal Police.
- Ram Chandra Upadhya, Constable, Bengal Police.
- Frederick Douglas Bartley, Deputy Commissioner of Port Police, Calcutta, Bengal Police.
- Ernest Albert Hartley, Assistant Commissioner. (Temporary), Calcutta, Bengal Police.
- Manmatha Nath Sen, Inspector, Bengal Police.
- Beni Madhab Chaudhuri, Sub-Inspector, Bengal Police.
- Subadar Shankar Singh, Inspector, Bengal Police.
- John Claude Thurlow Rivett-Carnac, MC, Officiating Superintendent, United Provinces Police.
- Khan Bahadur Munshi Mohammad Baqar Ali Khan, OM, Deputy Superintendent, United Provinces Police.
- Gauhar Khan, Head Constable, United Provinces Police.
- Majid Singh, Head Constable, United Provinces Police.
- Maurice Carmichael Tweedie, Deputy Inspector-General, United Provinces Police.
- Herbert Ashley Emile, Assistant Superintendent, United Provinces Police.
- Abdul Karim, Head Constable, Punjab Police.
- Khaliq Dad Khan, Inspector, Punjab Police.
- Ghulam Mohammad, Head Constable, Punjab Police.
- Maula Bukhsh, Foot Constable, Government Railway Police, Punjab Police.
- Nawab Din, Foot Constable, Government Railway Police, Punjab Police.
- Major R. Tilly, MC, IA, Commandant, Burma Military Police.
- Captain Arthur Clarence Everett Caiger, IA, Assistant Commandant, Burma Military Police.
- Captain James McKenzie Anderson, MC, IA, Assistant Commandant, Burma Military Police.
- Mahomed Yacoob Khan, Inspector, Burma Police.
- Muhammad Ismail, Inspector, Bihar & Orissa Police.
- Jagdeo Prasad Singh, Inspector, Bihar & Orissa Police.
- Banchhanidhi Naik, Constable, Bihar & Orissa Police.
- Sheo Lochan Singh, Constable, Bihar & Orissa Police.
- Madhusudan Rao Deshmukh, Inspector, Central Provinces Police.
- Gopal Singh, Sub-Inspector, Central Province Police.
- Muhammad Sher Khan, Sub-Inspector, North-West Frontier Police.
- Harri Singh, Officiating Sub-Inspector, North-West Frontier Police.
- Faqir Muhammad, Head Constable, North West Frontier Police.

His Majesty has also graciously consented to the King's Medal being handed to the nearest relative of the undermentioned Officer, who was killed on duty on 24 September, and who would have received the decoration had he survived:

- Christopher William Scott Coward, Assistant Superintendent, Madras Police.

Bar to the King's Police Medal

- Jack Elliot, Acting Superintendent, Madras Police.

British Dominions Beyond The Seas

- John Howe Carlisle, Chief of the Vancouver Fire Department, Canada.
- Nicholas Moore, First Class Detective, New South Wales Police.
- Francis John O'Donoghue, Constable, New Zealand Police.
- Roger John Wilson, Constable, New Zealand Police.
- Gurmukh Singh, Subadar, Straits Settlements Police.
- James Harcourt Daniel, Deputy Inspector General of Police, Criminal Investigation Department, Ceylon.
- Herbert Theodore Thomas, Inspector, Jamaica Constabulary Force.
- Captain Clive Selwyn Long-Innes, Superintendent, Kenya Police.
- Captain Frank Douris, Assistant Commissioner, Gold Coast Police.
- Theophilus McCain, Lance-Corporal, British Honduras Police.
- Mehmed Ibrahim Effendi, Inspector, First Grade, Cyprus Police.
- Frederick William Perryman, Acting Sergeant-Major, British Gendarmerie, Palestine.
- Ali Ahmed, Private, Palestine Gendarmerie.
- Alfred Whittaker, Inspector, Weihaiwei Police.
- Frank Forcey, Inspector, Weihaiwei Police.

=== Promotions ===
The following promotions have been made, dated 31 December 1922:

Royal Navy

Commander to Captain

- Hector Boyes, CMG.
- George W. Taylor.
- Arthur M. Lecky, DSO.
- John C. Davis, OBE.
- Percy R. Stevens, DSO.
- George H. D'O. Lyon.
- Richard M. King, DSO.
- Thomas F. P. Calvert, DSO.
- James A. G. Troup.
- Geoffrey Layton.

Lieutenant-Commander to Commander

- Harold A. Knight.
- Percy R. P. Percival, DSO.
- Geoffrey S. Holden.
- Victor E. Ward.
- Ernest J. Spooner, DSO.
- Franklin Ratsey.
- Arthur L. Jackson.
- Ambrose T. N. Abbay, DSO.
- James V. V. Magrane.
- John Brooke, DSC.
- Claude P. Hermon-Hodge, DSC.
- Frederic N. Attwood.
- Piers K. Kekewich.
- Ion B. B. Tower, DSC.
- Claud A. Merriman.
- Gerard W. T. Robertson.
- Arthur M. Peters, DSC.
- Victor H. Danckwerts.
- John F. B. Carslake
- Arthur J. Power.

Engineer Commander to Engineer Captain

- Ernest D. Sydenham.
- Herbert L. Parry, OBE.
- William H. Ham.
- William R. Crawford, CMG.
- John W. Milner, MVO.

Engineer Lieutenant-Commander to Engineer Commander

- Samuel Duncan Charles W. Keats.
- Edward J. Bedwell.
- John G. Parry.
- Henry J. Rampling.
- Leslie Gregory, OBE.
- John Pattinson.
- William A. Carlisle.
- Thomas Spalding.
- John S. Orr.

Surgeon Commander to Surgeon Captain

- Robert J. MacKeown, OBE, MB, DPH.
- Frank H. Nimmo, MVO.
- Richard F. Clark, DPH.
- Reginald St. G. S. Bond, MB, FRCS (Ed.), MRCP, DPH.

Paymaster Commander to Paymaster Captain

- Charles S. Wonham, CBE.
- Herbert A. D. J. Gyles.
- Frederick G. Motton.

Royal Marines

- Major Maurice C. Festing, DSO, Royal Marine Light Infantry, to Brevet Lieutenant-Colonel

Royal Naval Reserve

Commander to Captain

- William H. Kelly, CBE, DSO, RD.

Lieutenant-Commander to Commander

- Robert B. Thomson, RD.
- Hans Oppen, DSO, RD.
- Frank Pattinson, RD.
- Harold T. Dunn, RD.
- George ff. Harford-Lloyd, RD.
- Vincent S. Cottrell, RD.
- Dunsley H. Casson, RD.
- Robert L. Alexander, DSO, RD.
- John Jenkins, DSC, RD.

Paymaster Lieutenant-Commander to Paymaster Commander

- Hugh N. Page, RD.
- Laurence Y. Barnby, RD.
- Bernard H. Cooper, RD.
- Charles C. H. Drake, RD.
- Reginald R. Payne, RD.
- William B. Everett, RD.
- Frank Ward, RD.
- Archibald B. Campbell, RD.
- Farrant F. Aldridge, RD.
- Harold E. Egleton, RD.
- Sidney J. Marsh, RD.
- James A. Withers, RD.
- Arthur W. Fry, RD.
- Percy S. Sykes, OBE, RD.
- Anson V. Squire, RD.
- Joseph G. White, RD. (Registrar)

Royal Naval Volunteer Reserve

Lieutenant-Commander to Commander

- Robert C. Primrose, VD.

Surgeon Lieutenant-Commander to Surgeon-Commander

- Robert Wilbond.

Honorary Surgeon Lieutenant-Commander to Honorary Surgeon Commander

- Francis J. Hannan, MD.

Paymaster Lieutenant-Commander to Paymaster Commander

- John F. Carson, OBE.
- William H. Cole.

Army

Dated 1 January 1923, except where otherwise stated:

To Brevet Colonel

- Major & Brevet Lieutenant-Colonel D. J. C. K. Bernard, CMG, DSO, Rifle Brigade.
- Major & Brevet Lieutenant-Colonel W. K. Evans, CMG, DSO, Manchester Regiment.
- Lieutenant-Colonel B. D. Fisher, CMG, DSO, 17th/21st Lancers.
- Lieutenant-Colonel P. A. V. Stewart, CBE, DSO, King's Own Scottish Borderers.
- Major & Brevet Lieutenant-Colonel C. I. Stockwell, CB, CMG, DSO, Royal Welch Fusiliers.

To Brevet Lieutenant-Colonel

- Major J. S. Drew, DSO, MC, Camerons.
- Captain & Brevet Major S. S. Hill-Dillon, DSO, Royal Ulster Rifles.
- Major J. M. Hulton, CBE, DSO, Royal Sussex Regiment.

To Brevet Major

- Captain G. V. Breffit, MC, King's Shropshire Light Infantry.
- Captain W. Bruen, OBE, MC, Extra-Regimentally Employed List. (Dated 31 March 1922).
- Captain R. Francis, DSO, MC, Norfolk Regiment.
- Captain C. F. K. Marshall, DSO, MC, Royal Field Artillery.
- Captain F. Whitaker, MC, The Buffs.

To Brevet Major on promotion to the substantive rank of Captain

- Lieutenant C. V. D. Caillard, MC, Somerset Light Infantry.
- Lieutenant S. J. Cole, Wiltshire Regiment.

Royal Air Force

The undermentioned officers are promoted to the ranks stated, with effect from 1 January 1923:

General Duties Branch

Group Captain to Air Commodore

- Eugene Louis Gerrard, CMG, DSO.

Wing Commander to Group Captain

- Wilfrid Rhodes Freeman, DSO, MC.
- Patrick Henry Lyon Playfair, MC.
- Arthur Wellesley Bigsworth, CMG, DSO, AFC.

Squadron Leader to Wing Commander

- Thomas Gerard Hetherington, CBE.
- Alan Howard Jackson.
- Owen Tudor Boyd, OBE, MC, AFC.
- Justin Howard Herring, DSO, MC.
- John Hugh Samuel Tyssen, MC.

Flight Lieutenant to Squadron Leader

- Arthur John Opel.
- Ralph Towlerton Leather, AFC.
- Vyvyan Arthur Hemming Robeson, MC.
- John Henry D'Albiac, DSO.
- Francis Percival Don.
- George Brindley Aufrere Baker, MC.
- Harley Alec Tweedie, OBE, AFC.
- Roy Maxwell Drummond, DSO, OBE, MC.
- Arthur Hicks Peck, DSO, MC.
- Arthur Noel Gallehawk, AFC.

Flying Officer to Flight Lieutenant

- James Humphrey Butler.
- Charles Ronald Steele, DFC.
- Cyril Fraser Brewerton, DSC.
- Philip Herbert Mackworth, DFC.
- John Mecredy McAlery.
- Malcolm Dent Nares, AFC.
- Robert Sydney Pearce Boby.
- Gilbert Formby Smylie, DSC.
- Louis George Paget, AFC.
- Gerald Ernest Gibbs, MC.
- John Whitworth Jones.
- George Oswald Venn.
- Sylvester Lindsay Quine, MC.
- Edgar Theodore Carpenter, AFC.
- Cedric Walters Hill.
- Paul Richard Tankerville James Michael Isidore Camille Chamberlayne, AFC.
- Charles Robert Davidson, MC.
- Lance Harold Browning, MC, DFC.
- Ralph Edgar Meek.
- Lee Roy Lowerison Brown, DFC.
- Edric William Broadberry, MC.
- John Potter.
- Tom Oswald Clogstoun.
- Henry Dunboyne O'Neill, AFC.
- Cuthbert Joseph Stanley Dearlove.
- Kenneth Cromar Tilman.
- Harvey Lancelot Macro, DFC.
- Walter George Peeston, DFC.
- Edward Irwin Bussell.
- James Huddart Dand, MBE.
- Henry Basil Pett, MC.
- Henry Edward Walker, MC, DFC.
- Arthur Harold Beach.
- Leslie Millington Iles, AFC.
- Jack Cottle, MBE, DFC.
- Anthony Lauderdale Paxton, DFC.
- Albert Oliver Lewis-Roberts, DFC.
- Charles William Attwood.
- Gerald Mornington Bryer, AFC.
- Guy Yelverton Tyrrell, MC.
- David Craik, DFC.
- Albert Frank Lang, MBE.
- William Elliot, DFC.
- Frederick Robert Wynne.
- Kenelm Arthur Lister-Kaye.
- Ivor Morgan Rodney.
- Claude Vernon Aristides Bucknall.
- John Whitford.
- George Stairs Napier Johnston.

Stores Branch

Squadron Leader to Wing Commander

- William Robert Bruce, OBE.

Flight Lieutenant to Squadron Leader

- William Edgar Aylwin, OBE.
- Henry Lumsden Crichton, MBE.

Flying Officer to Flight Lieutenant

- Henry Edwin Thomas Crocker.

Stores Branch Accountants

Flight Lieutenant to Squadron Leader

- Arthur Geoffrey Nevill Belfield.
- Herbert George Jones.
- Herbert Francis Fuller.
- James Leask Robertson.

Flying Officer to Flight Lieutenant

- Ralf Harry Cleverly.
- Percy Jack Farmer.
- Harry George Bushell.
- Frank Owen Hall.
- Frederick William Arthturton.
- Geoffrey Noel Simon.
- Percival Hay, MC.
- Walter Rodgers Westcombe.
- Kenneth Robertson Money, OBE.
- John Sullivan.

Medical Branch

Wing Commander to Group Captain

- Henry Cooper, DSO, BA.
- Martin William Flack, CBE, MB, MA.

Squadron Leader to Wing Commander

- Harold Edward Whittingham, MB, DPH, DTM.

Flight Lieutenant to Squadron Leader

- Joseph Mary Aloysius Costello, MC, MD, MSc.
- John Hutchinson Wood, MC, MB, DPH.
- Arthur James Brown, DSO.

Director of Music

Flying Officer to Honorary Flight Lieutenant

- John Henry Amers.
