= Barff =

Barff is a surname. Notable people with the surname include:

- Edmund Barff (1833–1882), 19th-century Member of Parliament from the West Coast, New Zealand
- Frederick S. Barff (1822–1886), English chemist, ecclesiastical decorator, and stained glass manufacturer
- Henry Ebenezer Barff (1857–1925), Australian university administrator and mathematician
- Jane Foss Barff (1863–1937), second woman to attain a Master of Arts from the University of Sydney
- Samuel Barff (1793–1880), banker and a supporter of Greek independence

== See also ==
- Barff Peninsula, in Antarctica
- Bower–Barff process
