= Vivian Davenport =

British army soldier

V. H. S. Davenport
- Born: 12 September 1876
- Died: 8 March 1950 (aged 73); St. John's Wood, London
- Military career
- Allegiance: United Kingdom
- Branch: British Army
- Rank: Garrison Sergeant Major
- Conflicts: First World War
- Awards: Member of the Order of the British Empire; Military Cross; Distinguished Conduct Medal & Bar; Mentioned in Despatches

Coat of Arms of the Davenport of Davenport family

Garrison Sergeant Major Vivian Hugh Stuart Davenport MBE, MC, DCM & Bar (12 September 1876 – 8 March 1950) was a British Army soldier of the First World War. He was one of a very small number of soldiers to be twice awarded the Distinguished Conduct Medal for gallantry.

== Early life ==
Davenport was the son of Lieutenant Vivian Davenport, who served with the 26th (Cameronian) Regiment of Foot. He was educated at Bloxham School, Oxfordshire.

== Military service ==
At age 23, Davenport joined the 2nd Battalion, The Border Regiment, serving in Africa, India and Flanders. He was first awarded the Distinguished Conduct Medal (DCM) on 1 April 1915, while serving as company sergeant major. His citation read:

For conspicuous gallantry on numerous occasions, especially on 28th October 1914, when he went alone under heavy fire and destroyed one of the enemy’s machine guns.

He was awarded a Bar to his DCM several months later, on 13 August 1915:

For gallant conduct and devotion to duty on the 16th May 1915, at Festubert, when, assisted by another man, he carried back an officer who was wounded, from half way between the British and German lines, under a very heavy and destructive fire.

He was also awarded the Military Cross in the 1915 Birthday Honours. Davenport was invested as a Member of the Order of the British Empire in the 1923 New Year Honours.
