= Arthur Meek Pountney =

British colonial administrator (1873-1940)

Arthur Meek Pountney CBE CMG (30 December 1873 – 14 November 1940) was a British colonial administrator who served for many years as head of the Treasury of the Straits Settlements and the Federated Malay States.

== Early life and education ==
Pountney was born on 30 December 1873 in Reading. He was educated at Reading School and University College, Oxford where he graduated in mathematics.

== Career ==
in 1896, he joined the civil service of the Federated Malay States as a cadet. After studying Cantonese in Canton, he returned to Malaya and served in the Chinese Protectorate department in Singapore, Perak and Selangor, dealing with the affairs of ethnic Chinese residents. In 1910, he oversaw the census in Singapore as Superintendent of Census in addition to his other duties.

In 1913, he joined the Treasury department and rose to the position of Colonial Treasurer of the Straits Settlements. During the First World War, he served as Collector-General of War Tax receiving the appreciation of the Secretary of State of the Colonies for his services. In 1921, he was appointed Financial Adviser to the Straits Settlements and the Federated Malay States.

Whilst in office, he was confronted with the thorny issue of opium revenues. The British colonial authorities in Malaya were highly reliant on revenue collected from the legal sale of opium but after the First World War such practice became untenable as the British came under increasing international pressure to end taxation of opium consumption. The British government in London urged the authorities in the Straits Settlements to end the dependency and devise alternative methods to raise revenues. After various proposals to replace the opium revenues, including increasing taxation, were dismissed as unworkable and insufficient, in 1925, Pountney designed the Opium Revenue Replacement Fund which provided for the establishment of an investment fund of $30million Straits into which 10% of the colony's reserve would be paid in annually with the expectation that income from the fund would within a reasonable time approximate opium revenues. Pountney's financial innovation proved a success and endured until 1953 under the management of Crown Agents attached to the Treasury in London.

In addition to his role as Financial Adviser to the governments of the Straits Settlements and the Federated Malay States, he served as a member of the Executive and Legislative Councils, and a member of the Federal Council. He also served as chairman on various committees including the Advisory Committee on Opium, the 1923 Committee, the Municipal Sinking Funds Investing Committee, and acted as Collector of Stamp Duties, Straits Settlements. He retired in 1926.

== Personal life and death ==
Pountney married in 1904 and he and his wife Nora had a daughter. He died in England on 14 November 1940, aged 67.

== Honours ==
Pountney was appointed Commander of the Order of the British Empire (CBE) in the 1919 Birthday Honours, and was appointed Companion of the Order of St Michael and St George (CMG) in the 1923 New Year Honours.
