= John Harper Narbeth =

British naval architect

John Harper Narbeth, CB, CBE, MVO (26 May 1863 – 19 May 1944) was a British naval architect of the Royal Corps of Naval Constructors, the body responsible for the design of Royal Navy warships. The design of the dreadnought battleships has been attributed to him, and he played a leading part in the design and construction of the first generation of aircraft carriers.

== Background and early career ==
Born at Pembroke Dock on 26 May 1863, he was one of the nine children of John Harper Narbeth (himself the son of another of that name) and his wife Ann Griffiths. The father, described as “a man of sterling worth of character and intellectual acumen”, was a cost accountant in Pembroke Royal Dockyard, and in 1877 the son followed him into that establishment as an apprentice shipwright. The yard had just been assessed by the United States Navy’s Chief Constructor to be “the finest shipbuilding yard in the world”, and during his apprenticeship the younger Narbeth gained experience on a variety of vessels including the training brig Nautilus, one of the last wooden vessels commissioned for the Royal Navy.

He obtained the highest marks in his year’s passing-out examination and was placed second in the national competition for advanced training at Greenwich Royal Naval College. On completing three years at Greenwich as a Student in Naval Architecture, he entered the Royal Corps of Naval Constructors and was appointed an Assistant Constructor (Third Class) at Portsmouth, being the first man ever to move directly to that grade on leaving the College. At Portsmouth he was involved in building the first-class battleships Camperdown and Trafalgar and temporarily served as Dockyard Schoolmaster.

== Admiralty employment 1888 to 1907 ==
Transferred to the Admiralty in 1888, he joined the staff of Sir William White, the Director of Naval Construction, and after assignments of a varied nature was soon entrusted with “the work at which he became supremely adept – the preparation of warship designs”.

He took a leading part in the design of the Apollo class of cruisers, and the methods of calculation and tabulation devised by him so impressed White that orders were issued for these to be followed in all future designs. Directed by White to investigate the considerable discrepancy between the design and completion weights of warships during the later 1880s, his recommendations resulted in battleships of the Majestic class being completed within the limits of their design weights. He served as White’s professional secretary from 1894 to 1897 and assisted in revising his Manual of Naval Architecture.

He was Secretary of the Committee on Sheathing Her Majesty’s Ships in 1892 and, in the following year, of the Admiralty working-party that reported to Parliament on the sinking of HMS Victoria. Elected a member of the Royal Institution of Naval Architects in 1896, he was advanced to the rank of Assistant Constructor (First Class) in the following year. In 1900 he successfully directed the stabilisation of the royal yacht Victoria and Albert after it heeled over while being undocked.

In 1901, while in Hyde Park to watch the procession of the State Funeral of Queen Victoria, he was caught in a forward rush of spectators and impaled on railings; his injuries were life-threatening and he was fortunate to be operated on immediately at St George’s Hospital (then adjacent to the Park). He made a good recovery and was promoted to Constructor in 1901.

He took a leading role in the design of the Edward VII class of battleships during Sir William White’s ill health, and was also associated with the design of the Lord Nelson class, but both these classes were effectively rendered obsolete in 1904 when the newly-appointed First Sea Lord, Admiral Fisher, persuaded the Admiralty Board that the British navy should be equipped with fast all-big-gun warships. Under Fisher’s chairmanship, a “Committee on Designs” was appointed to elaborate and advance this objective.

The distinguishing features of the type of battleship favoured by Fisher had been suggested in 1903 by Vittorio Cuniberti, Chief Constructor of the Italian Navy, and in September of that year Narbeth had put forward a similar proposal as an alternative to designs being developed by others at the Admiralty, but his proposal for an armament of twelve 12-inch guns arranged in six turrets was then regarded as too innovative.

Two years later, in tandem with endorsing the need for a battleship of the type favoured by Fisher, the Committee on Designs supported its chairman’s proposal for development of a new fast cruiser armed with heavy guns. In response, Narbeth prepared design sketches for both a battleship with a speed of 21-knots and a cruiser of 25-knots, each mounting all 12-inch guns. His designs were regarded as unacceptably radical by Sir Philip Watts, who had succeeded William White as Director of Naval Construction, and for some time Watts resisted their presentation to the Committee. When eventually tabled, they were vigorously supported by Fisher and became the basis for, respectively, the Dreadnought-class battleship and the Invincible-class battlecruiser. The Admiralty Board approved the outline designs for the vessels on 17 March and the detailed designs, as worked out by Narbeth, on 7 July 1905.

== “Creator of the Dreadnought” ==
The design for HMS Dreadnought and the novel features it embodied, particularly propulsion by steam turbines (then still at an experimental stage), presented many difficulties which Narbeth was considered to have “surmounted with complete success”. Unprecedented methods were employed in building the ship, and Narbeth was sent to Portsmouth to provide advice as construction proceeded. (Note: Reporting the ship’s launch, the Daily Telegraph of 12 February 1906, p. 10, described Narbeth as one of the constructors “in charge of the ship in building”. Elsewhere he has been said to have “supervised its construction”: D. F. Hutchings, “Portsmouth Dockyard and the Dreadnought”, Black Jack, No. 25, Naval Supplement No. 3 (Winter 1977-78), Southampton Branch, World Ship Society, p. 9.) During the work he devised numerous improvements, and twenty-five alternative designs were produced for consideration by the Admiralty Board before the next battleship of this class was ordered.

Laid down on 2 October 1905, Dreadnought was launched by Edward VII on 10 February 1906 and was complete and ready for trials one year and one day after work had begun. The launch was accompanied by an investiture at which the King decorated several naval officers with senior honours of the Royal Victorian Order and, among the lesser awards, appointed Narbeth an MVO (Fourth Class).

The creation of Dreadnought revolutionised warship construction, set the battleship design standard for the next forty years, and gave Britain “a head-start in a new round of the arms race”. In 1906 Narbeth received the formal thanks of the Board of Admiralty for his share in production of the vessel, but his leading role in its development did not become public knowledge until revealed by the British Weekly in October 1907. (Note: It was contemporary convention not publicly to identify individual contributions to the design of Royal Naval vessels, the Director of Naval Construction assuming personal responsibility for every part of a ship when he signed off the designs according to which it was built. In writing and lecturing on the work with which he had been involved, Narbeth deviated from this convention by making laudatory comment on the contribution of named individuals and was criticised for so doing: David K. Brown, “Warship Design Methods, 1860-1905”, Warship International, Vol. 32, No. 1 (1995), pp. 62 and 82; Transactions of the Institution of Naval Architects, Vol. 64 (1922), p. 50.) The revelation, which also named him as designer of the Edward VII and Lord Nelson battleships, sparked press complaints that he had not been properly rewarded for his work; there were calls for his achievements to be “more fittingly recognised than by the empty honour of the MVO” and for him to be promoted to the rank of Chief Constructor. (Note: Full details of the vessels’ designs did not become generally available until they passed out of active service after the end of World War I. Their evolution was explained by Narbeth in his paper “Three Steps in Naval Construction: King Edward VII - Lord Nelson - Dreadnought” presented to the Institution of Naval Architects in 1922: Western Morning News, 6 April 1922, p. 4.)

More recently it has been suggested that his reputation as designer of Dreadnought (the accolade which became commonplace and was to caption his obituaries), should be treated with caution because his relatively junior position in the Admiralty’s hierarchy necessitated his work being subject to review and instruction by successive levels of more senior officials. However, the force of Narbeth’s personality may have been a critical factor in driving his proposals forward: he was remembered as fearless in confronting authority and completely stubborn when believing that he was right.

== Admiralty service 1907 to 1914 ==
In 1907 he moved from the battleships section of the Naval Construction Department to head the auxiliary ships section, and over the next few years he worked on the design and construction of ship’s boats, oil tankers, whalers and gigs, cutters and dinghies, improved “out of all recognition” the design of rowing and sailing boats, and was responsible for a new series of motorboats varying from twenty to fifty feet in length.

He was promoted to Chief Constructor in 1911 and was joint-secretary of the Royal Commission on Fuel and Engines in 1912. He assisted Sir Philip Watts in preparing the substantial entry for “Ship” in the 11th Edition of Encyclopaedia Britannica, 1911.

== 1914 to 1923 ==
During the First World War he was engaged in the design of Flower-class sloops for use as minesweepers or as submarine decoys (Q-ships) and in the development of Racecourse-class minesweepers from paddle steamers. Sir Eustace Tennyson-d'Eyncourt, who had been appointed Director of Naval Construction in 1912, also deployed him on completion of the Dragon, Emerald, and Hawkins classes of cruisers and, perhaps most importantly, (Note: His obituary notice in Transactions of the Institution of Naval Architects, Vol. 86 (1944), p. 246, described this as his “most important work at the Admiralty.”) he was responsible for the evolution of aircraft carrier design, on which he continued to work in the post-war years. In 1921 he designed a floating dock for seaplane maintenance: later popularly known as “HMS Flat Iron”, this continued in service at various locations until 1947. (Note: Intended for the service of seaplanes at bases where there was no slipway, the dock was able to submerge, allow two planes to float on to it, and then raise itself up to enable even the most complex maintenance to proceed. Its creation earned Narbeth a special letter of thanks from the Air Ministry and as late as 1937 it was “the only one of its kind in the world”: Journal of Commerce and Shipping Telegraph, Liverpool, Shipbuilding and Engineering Edition, 12 July 1923, p. 3; News Chronicle, 27 May 1937, p. 23.)

He was appointed a substantive Assistant Director of Naval Construction in 1919 (having previously acted in that capacity) and was made a CBE in the following year.

== Design of aircraft carriers ==
In 1914 the Admiralty, alert to the potential for aircraft to enhance operational capability in naval warfare, resolved to develop a depot ship for the transport and servicing of seaplanes. Working in conjunction with Murray Sueter and Cecil Malone of the newly formed Royal Naval Air Service, Narbeth established the criteria according to which, together with his assistant C. J. W. Hopkins, (Note: Hopkins worked closely with Narbeth on the development of all his aircraft carrier designs. At some point during their association the pair devised a novel coupling for flexible hoses and, somewhat unusually, the Admiralty allowed them to patent the invention for their own account and reserved a right of use which was thought to have saved the Navy £40,000 by 1922. The couplings were known as “Narkins”, after the inventors: Journal of Commerce and Shipping Telegraph, Liverpool, Shipbuilding and Engineering Edition, 6 July 1922, p. 6.) he evolved the design for the first Ark Royal. To expedite construction of this vessel, the incomplete hull of a tramp steamer was purchased; engines were relocated and a bridge built aft, allowing a long and level flight-deck forward with hangar space below sufficient for ten seaplanes that could be hoisted to and from deck and sea by steam-cranes amidships. The Ark Royal sailed for the Dardanelles in February 1915 and the first combat mission was flown from her in the same month. While the vessel was under construction, Narbeth also adapted the former Cunard liner Campania and the Isle of Man ferry Ben-my-Chree to carry seaplanes, and the latter relieved Ark Royal in January 1916.

By late 1916 it was recognised that aeroplanes had greater capabilities than seaplanes in warfare, that larger and faster carriers were necessary for service in conjunction with fast cruisers, and that on-deck landing of aircraft was feasible if the size of carriers was increased. This was the background to Narbeth’s subsequent carrier-related work, and from 1918 onward he was Chairman of the Joint Technical Committee on Aviation Arrangements in His Majesty’s Ships, coordinating Admiralty and Air Ministry involvement in the process of carrier evolution.

He was responsible for the designs that governed the conversion to carriers of Argus (purchased as an incomplete passenger ship) and Eagle (laid down as a battleship), the creation of Hermes (the first ship designed and built from keel up as an aircraft carrier), the radical reconfiguration of Furious, and the transformation into carriers of the battlecruisers Courageous and Glorious. Experience during some of these projects informed work on the others, and only the conversions of Argus and Eagle were completed prior to Narbeth’s retirement in 1923.

At various points in the evolutionary process a flush deck configuration was favoured, but ultimately a design incorporating a single control island on deck was preferred. The decision to site the island on the ship’s starboard side was taken by Narbeth (Note: This arrangement had been arbitrarily proposed by Lieut. Hugh Williamson, RNAS, in 1915. Narbeth said he made the decision in light of what pilots told him: to clear the ship after a failed approach, they would turn to port because the torque effect of a rotary engine revolving round a fixed camshaft tended to lift the nose of an aircraft upward in a left turn: Guy Robbins, The Aircraft Carrier Story, 1908-1945, Cassell & Co., London, 2001, p. 29; Dan Linton, The Evolution of the Aircraft Carrier: The First Two Decades, Part IV.) and this arrangement, initiated in Eagle, has been perpetuated on virtually every subsequent aircraft carrier, whether British or foreign.

In the 1923 New Year Honours Narbeth was made a CB, the Liverpool Journal of Commerce asserting that the honour recognised the special esteem in which he was held within the “blue-water Navy” where his labours to minimise the risk of fire at sea had won particular appreciation. In March that year he and Sir Eustace Tennyson-d'Eyncourt jointly presented a paper to the Institute of Naval Architects proposing that the knowledge gained in developing aircraft carriers for defence purposes might well be exploited by building steamships that could carry aircraft and thereby, for example, enable transatlantic mail and passengers to reach Montreal and Halifax before the ships arrived at New York. (Note: The paper included an outline design for a vessel with accommodation for 1,600 passengers and crew, and hangar space for 60 aircraft with folding wings. “The Coming ‘Aircraft-Liner’”, based on this design, was illustrated in the Illustrated London News of 10 March 1928, p. 389. Escort carriers converted from merchant ships in World War II “bore some resemblance” to the type of vessel proposed: C. S. Lillicrap, Obituary for Eustace Tennyson d’Eyncourt, 1869-1951, Biographical Memoirs of Fellows of the Royal Society, Vol. 7, Issue 20 (Nov. 1951), pp. 341-354 at p. 349.)

== Retirement and death ==
He retired from the Admiralty in the following August, (Note: In retirement he lived in Sedlescombe Road South, St Leonards-on-Sea, where he named his house Lawrenny after the Pembrokeshire parish where members of the Narbeth family had lived in the seventeenth and early eighteenth centuries: Who’s Who 1931, p. 2316; Francis Green (ed.), “Pembrokeshire Hearths in 1670, West Wales Historical Records, Vol. XI, Historical Society of West Wales, Carmarthen, 1926, p. 128; Pembrokeshire Record Office, Indenture of 28/29 March 1738, D-LLW/14.) and in 1926 obtained accreditation as a Methodist local preacher, a position his father had occupied on the Pembroke circuit for more than half a century. He had for many years been active in the Sunday School and Temperance movements and continued so until his death, which occurred at Gloucester on 19 May 1944.

His ashes were interred in Hastings Cemetery, where the inscription on his tombstone reads “Faithful to God and his Country He loved to create ships and make people smile”.

== Family ==
Narbeth married, at Portsea in 1888, Aquila Elizabeth Anstey. She, who was a sister of Rear-Admiral William Anstey, RN, Assistant Engineer-in-Chief to the Admiralty, 1911–14, predeceased him. They had two sons, the elder of whom (the fourth successive generation John Harper Narbeth) followed his father’s profession, had charge of the building of the cruiser Aurora at Portsmouth in 1935-6, and was Chief Constructor at Devonport Dockyard, Auckland, New Zealand, in 1943.

== Publications ==
Published papers or articles by Narbeth include

- “Three Steps in Naval Construction, King Edward VII - Lord Nelson - Dreadnought”, Transactions of the Institute of Naval Architects, Vol. 64 (1922)
- “A Proposed Aircraft-carrying Mail Steamer” (jointly with Sir Eustace d’Eyncourt), Transactions of the Institute of Naval Architects, Vol. 65 (1923)
- “50 Years of Naval Progress”, The Shipbuilder, Shipbuilder Press, Newcastle-upon-Tyne, 1927, pp. 516, 568, 603
- “A Naval Architect’s Practical Experience in the Behaviour of Ships”, Transactions of the Royal Institute of Naval Architects, Vol. 83 (1941)
