= Hugh Lindsay Patrick Heard =

Royal Navy Admiral (1869–1934)

Admiral Hugh Lindsay Patrick Heard CB DSO
- Born: August 2, 1869; Bangalore, India
- Died: July 23, 1954 (aged 84); Fontainebleau, Seine-et-Marne, France
- Burial place: Cimetière de Fontainebleau, France
- Parent(s): Dr. Samuel Thomas Heard; Kate Bradley
- Military career
- Allegiance: United Kingdom
- Branch: Royal Navy
- Service years: 1883–1926
- Rank: Admiral
- Commands: HMS Magnificent (1912–1913); HMS Exmouth (1913–1914); HMS Grafton (1914–1915); HMS Duncan (1915–1917); HMS Renown (1919); HMS Indomitable (1919); HMS Centurion (1919); Devonport Dockyard (Admiral Superintendent, 1922–1924)
- Conflicts: First World War
- Awards: Companion of the Order of the Bath (CB); Distinguished Service Order (DSO)

Hugh Lindsay Patrick Heard CB DSO (2 August 1869 – 23 July 1954) was a senior officer in the Royal Navy who served as Admiral Superintendent of Devonport Dockyard.

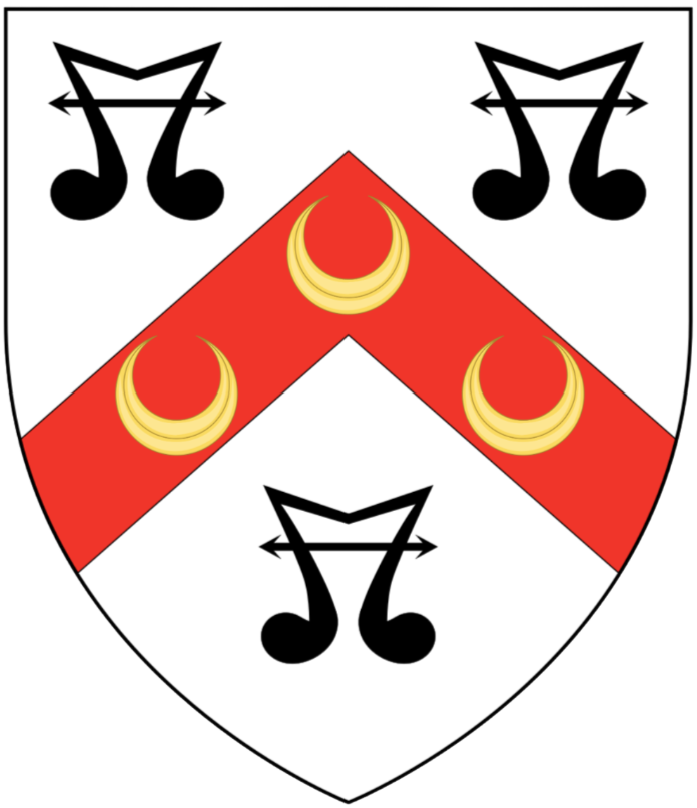
Arms of Heard of Kinsale Escutcheon: Argent, on a chevron gules between three water bougets sable as many crescents or. Crest: A demi-antelope ppr., ducally gorged or, charged on the shoulder with a water bouget as in the arms. Motto: Audior ("I Heard") or Toujours fidèle ("Always faithful")

== Early life ==
Hugh Lindsay Patrick Heard was born on 2 August 1869 Bangalore, India into an old Anglo-Irish family, the son of Dr. Samuel Thomas Heard (1835–1921), a former Surgeon Major in the Indian Army and High Sheriff of Kerry, and Kate Heard (née Bradley), who was 28 at the time of his birth. He grew up alongside three brothers and two sisters. Unlike his brothers, who were educated at Harrow School, Heard entered the Royal Navy at an early age. He passed his entrance examination with a score of 1,332 marks in late 1882 and joined the naval training ship HMS Britannia as a naval cadet in January 1883.

== Naval career ==
Heard was promoted to lieutenant on 1 April 1892. In January 1903, he was posted as first and gunnery lieutenant to the cruiser HMS Gibraltar, serving on the Cape of Good Hope Station. He was promoted to commander on 31 December 1903. In 1904, he received official thanks from the Admiralty for his invention of an instrument for determining Range Rate, an innovation distinct from, though comparable to, the Dumaresq. He was subsequently promoted to captain on 30 June 1910. On 13 May 1912, Heard assumed command of the pre-dreadnought battleship HMS Magnificent. On 16 June 1913, he grounded the ship; an inquiry determined he had been too late in anchoring her given the prevailing weather conditions. He was discharged from the ship on 1 July and directly appointed to command HMS Exmouth, operating with the Sixth Battle Squadron. He remained in command of Exmouth until February 1914, when he was appointed to *President* to undertake a signal course.

== First World War ==
Upon the outbreak of the First World War in August 1914, Heard assumed command of the first-class protected cruiser HMS Grafton. On 3 July 1915, he was appointed to command the pre-dreadnought battleship HMS Duncan, serving in her until 15 April 1917. For his wartime services, he was awarded the Distinguished Service Order (DSO). On 23 April 1917, he was appointed to Colleen as Senior Naval Officer at Berehaven, serving in the rank of Commodore, Second Class.

== Post-war commands and retirement ==
Following the armistice, Heard took command of several major vessels:

- Appointed to command the battlecruiser HMS Renown on 7 January 1919.
- Appointed to command the battlecruiser HMS Indomitable on 16 January 1919.
- Appointed to command the battleship HMS Centurion on 1 March 1919.

He was promoted to rear-admiral on 26 February 1921. On 20 September 1922, he assumed office as Admiral Superintendent of Devonport Dockyard, serving until 1924. In the 1923 New Year Honours, he was appointed a Companion of the Order of the Bath (CB).

He was promoted to vice-admiral on 7 July 1926 and placed on the Retired List the following day, in accordance with the Order in Council of 9 March 1914. He was subsequently advanced to the rank of admiral on the retired list on 15 May 1930.

== Personal life ==
Heard died on 23 July 1954 in Fontainebleau, Seine-et-Marne, France, at the age of 84, and was buried in the municipal cemetery of Fontainebleau.

== Military offices ==
Military offices
Preceded by Bernard L. Majendie	Captain of HMS Cadmus; 11 July 1908 – 24 September 1910	Succeeded by Hubert Lynes
Preceded by Laurence E. Power	Captain of HMS Monmouth; 24 September 1910 – January 1911	Succeeded by Brian H. F. Barttelot
Preceded by Charles E. Le Mesurier	Captain of HMS Theseus; 15 February 1912 – 13 May 1912	Succeeded by Charles W. C. Strickland
Preceded by Wyndham L. Bamber	Captain of HMS Magnificent; 13 May 1912 – 1 July 1913	Succeeded by James D. D. Stewart
Preceded by Thomas W. Kemp	Captain of HMS Exmouth; 1 July 1913 – 9 February 1914	Succeeded by Henry R. Veale
Preceded by Charles E. W. Pyddoke	Captain of HMS Grafton; 31 July 1914 – 23 November 1914	Succeeded by Henry E. Grace
Preceded by Unknown	Captain of HMS Columbella; 23 November 1914 – 3 July 1915	Succeeded by Arthur Bromley
Preceded by Alexander P. Davidson	Captain of HMS Duncan; 3 July 1915 – 15 April 1917	Succeeded by Unknown
Preceded by Odiarne U. Coates	Senior Naval Officer, Berehaven; 23 April 1917 – 16 January 1919	Succeeded by Charles R. Sharp
Preceded by Ernest K. Loring	Captain of HMS Indomitable; 16 January 1919 – 1 March 1919	Succeeded by Henry R. Veale
Preceded by Douglas L. Dent	Captain of HMS Centurion; 1 March 1919 – 11 April 1921	Succeeded by Richard G. A. W. Stapleton-Cotton
Preceded by Edwin V. Underhill	Admiral Superintendent, Devonport Dockyard; 20 September 1922 – 1 November 1924	Succeeded by Louis C. S. Woollcombe
