= Edward Mitchener Cook =

British colonial administrator (1881–1955)

Sir Edward Cook CSI CIE

Financial Adviser to the Government of Siam
- In office 1925–1930

Secretary to the Government of India, finance department
- In office 1919–1923

Personal details
- Born: January 1881
- Died: 6 August 1955 (aged 74)
- Children: 5
- Education: Clare College, Cambridge
- Occupation: Colonial administrator and expert on public financial management

Sir Edward Mitchener Cook (January 1881 – 6 August 1955) was a British colonial administrator and expert on public financial management who worked in British India, Siam and Egypt.

== Early life and education ==
Cook was born in January 1881, the son of Charles C. Cook. He was educated at Uppingham School and Clare College, Cambridge where he took Maths Tripos in 1902.

== Career ==
Cook joined Indian Civil Service in 1904, was posted to the United Provinces government, and rose to the position of under-secretary of the province in 1909. In 1911, he was appointed under-secretary to the Home department of the government of India. In 1912, he was transferred to the Finance department and became account-general of Bombay. After serving as acting controller of currency, in 1919 he was appointed secretary to the government of India, finance department, a post he held until 1923.

Responsible for preparing the annual budget, the finances of the government of India were under strain due to the Afghan War and the rise in the exchange value of the Rupee, and additional revenue was difficult to obtain, requiring a vote from the Legislature. According to The Times, "In these difficult conditions Cook proved his ability", and his early retirement from the Indian Civil Service was "a decided loss to India." Then for several months between 1923 and 1924, he served as secretary to the high commissioner to India.

After leaving the Indian Civil Service, Cook, on the recommendation of Lord Norman, Governor of the Bank of England, was appointed Financial Adviser to the Government of Siam in 1925, succeeding W. Williamson, and was responsible for preparing the annual budget. At the end of his five years in office he was credited with placing the government's finances on a sound basis. According to a report published on the eve of his retirement, on Cook's arrival in Siam the country was faced with great financial difficulties but, "thanks to a policy of severe retrenchment, supported by the King, it was possible to completely rehabilitate the national finances. Sir Edward has fully realised the necessity of a cautious and conservative policy." In 1931, he was appointed governor of the National Bank of Egypt, a post he held until 1940 when he was forced to retire due to ill-health.

Cook went to live in Kashmir but was persuaded to come out of retirement by the government who offered him the position of China relations officer to India. Later, he returned to Egypt but resigned due to his failing eyesight, and he settled in Cyprus.

== Personal life and death ==
Cook married three times. First, in 1904 to Christine Duke with whom he had two sons and two daughters. The marriage was dissolved in 1924 following divorce proceedings brought by his wife. Then in 1924, to Catharine Rideout, Lady Montagu Webb, with whom he had a daughter. Catherine died in 1938. Then in 1940 he married Frances Baxter.

Cook died on 6 August 1955, aged 74.

== Honours ==
- Cook was created a Knight Bachelor in the 1923 Birthday Honours.
- He was appointed Companion of the Order of the Indian Empire (CIE) in the 1919 New Year Honours.
- He was appointed Companion of the Order of the Star of India (CSI) in the 1923 New Year Honours.
- He was awarded the Knight of the Grand Cross of the Order of the White Elephant in 1930.
- He was awarded the Grand Cross of the Order of the Nile.
