= Jane Foss Barff =

Second woman to attain a Master of Arts degree at Sydney University (1863–1937)

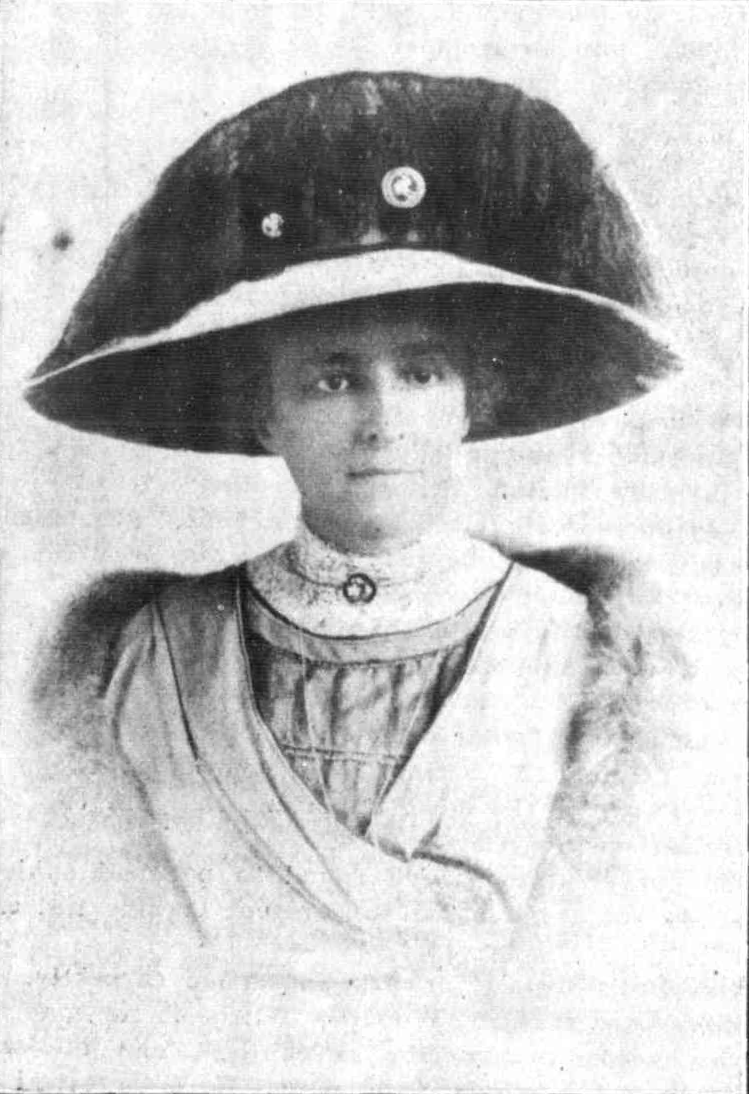
- Jane Foss Barff
- Born: Jane Foss Russell; 24 October 1863; Sydney, Australia
- Died: 10 June 1937 (aged 73); Rose Bay, Sydney, Australia
- Education: Graduated from the University of Sydney with a Bachelor of Arts and a Masters of Arts
- Known for: Educator and activist for women's rights to education
- Memorials: The Jane Foss Russell Building and The Jane Foss Barff Memorial Prize for Classics

Jane Foss Barff (née Russell) (24 October 1863 – 10 June 1937) was the second woman to attain a Master of Arts from the University of Sydney. She was a founding member of the Women’s College and a co founding member of the Sydney University Women’s Association.

== Early life ==
Jane Foss Barff was born on 24 October 1864 in Sydney, Australia. She was the daughter of Henry Chamberlain Russell, a government astronomer and meteorologist. She spent much of her youth in the Sydney Observatory because of her father's occupation. She had a long lasting academic career which began in her school years; she passed the Junior Public Examination and received the Fairfax prize for the best female student in 1878. Three years later she sat for the Senior Public Examination in eight subjects, and passed with first class honours, again sharing the prize for the best female pupil. After completing secondary college, she spent the next year at home because the university she wished to study at did not accept women. However, in 1881 when the University of Sydney was open to women she applied to study at the college. Although women were still unable to participate in courses such as medicine because the discussion of the human body was deemed not an appropriate topic.

== Education ==
In 1883 she was among the second group of women to enrol at the University of Sydney. Whilst at the college she studied classics, chemistry, physics and mathematics. In her first year she obtained first class honours in classics, chemistry and physics, and second class honours in mathematics. She then graduated with a Bachelor of Arts in 1886, with first class honours in classics and a second class honours in mathematics. In 1889 she became the second woman to receive a Masters of Arts from the University of Sydney. In the same year she received a degree in Moral Philosophy.

== Career ==
After completing her tertiary education, she undertook a study tour of England in 1886. She visited Girton, Newnham and Holloway colleges, where she gained an insight into the organisations. In 1887 she returned to Sydney and began teaching mathematics at the Ascham School for Girls and later at Kambala. She tutored the students at both schools, as well as private pupils for the Public Examinations and for the examinations at the University.

In 1892 she completed her teaching career in schools and was appointed the second tutor to female students at the University of Sydney, the only female post on the teaching staff where she earned a total of £250 annually. Helen Phillips was the first tutor. She resigned from the position in 1899 to marry Henry Ebenezer Barff, the University registrar and warden.

== Community work ==
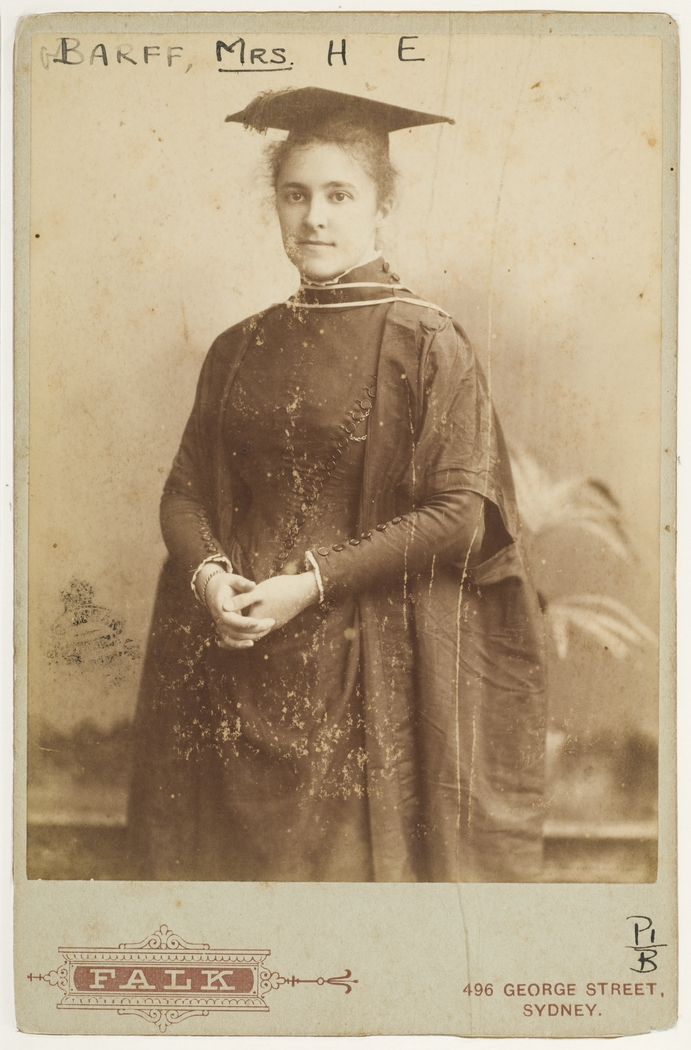
Jane Foss Barff (née Russell)

Jane Foss Barff's involvement in the women’s organisations of the University of Sydney was extensive. She was a founding member of the Sydney University Women's Society in 1891 which was established by Helen Phillips. Whilst a member she worked at the Newington Asylum for aged women at Silverwater, the Woolloomooloo girls club and the Harrington Street night school for girls. In 1892 she and Louisa Macdonald created the Sydney University Women's Association where she was named President. She also had a long involvement with the council of the Women's College, between 1891 and 1937. Furthermore, she was the President of the University Women’s Settlement between 1914 and 1915 and from 1919 to 1924.

Jane Foss Barff was also a strong advocate for religious education for young people, and was a council member of the Mothers' Union and of the St Catherine's Church of England School for Girls.

== Later life ==
Jane Foss Barff died on 10 June 1937 in her Rose Bay home, and was later buried in the Waverley cemetery. She made a gift by her will to the University of Sydney of a silver tea and coffee service which had previously been presented to her husband, Henry Ebenezer Barff, after he completed 25 years of service at the University of Sydney. She stated in her will that she hoped 'the service may be used by the Chancellor and Vice Chancellor when entertaining distinguished visitors to the University'. However, she left her estate of £8000 and numerous possessions to her daughter.

== Legacies ==
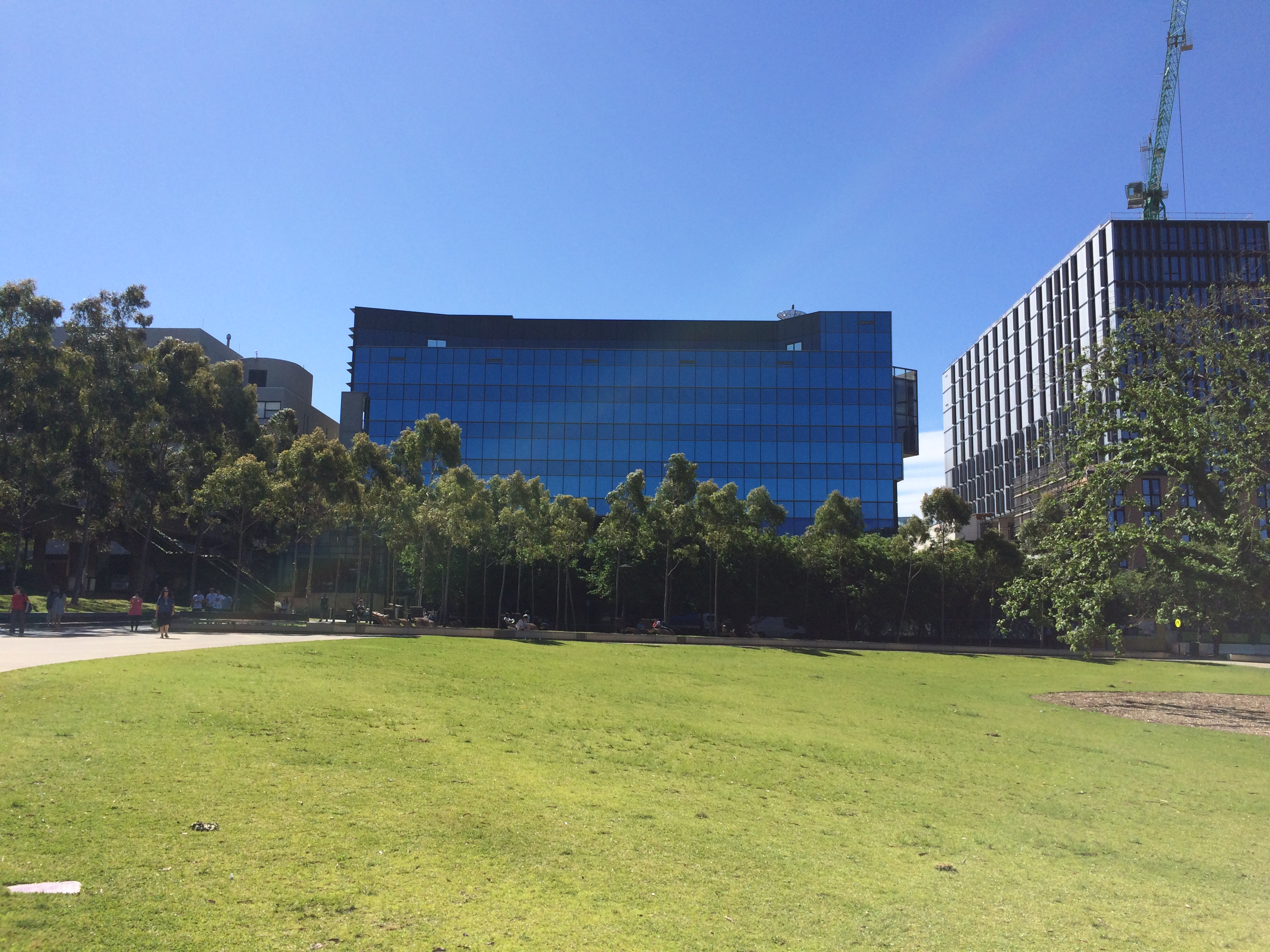
Jane Foss-Russell Building (west face)

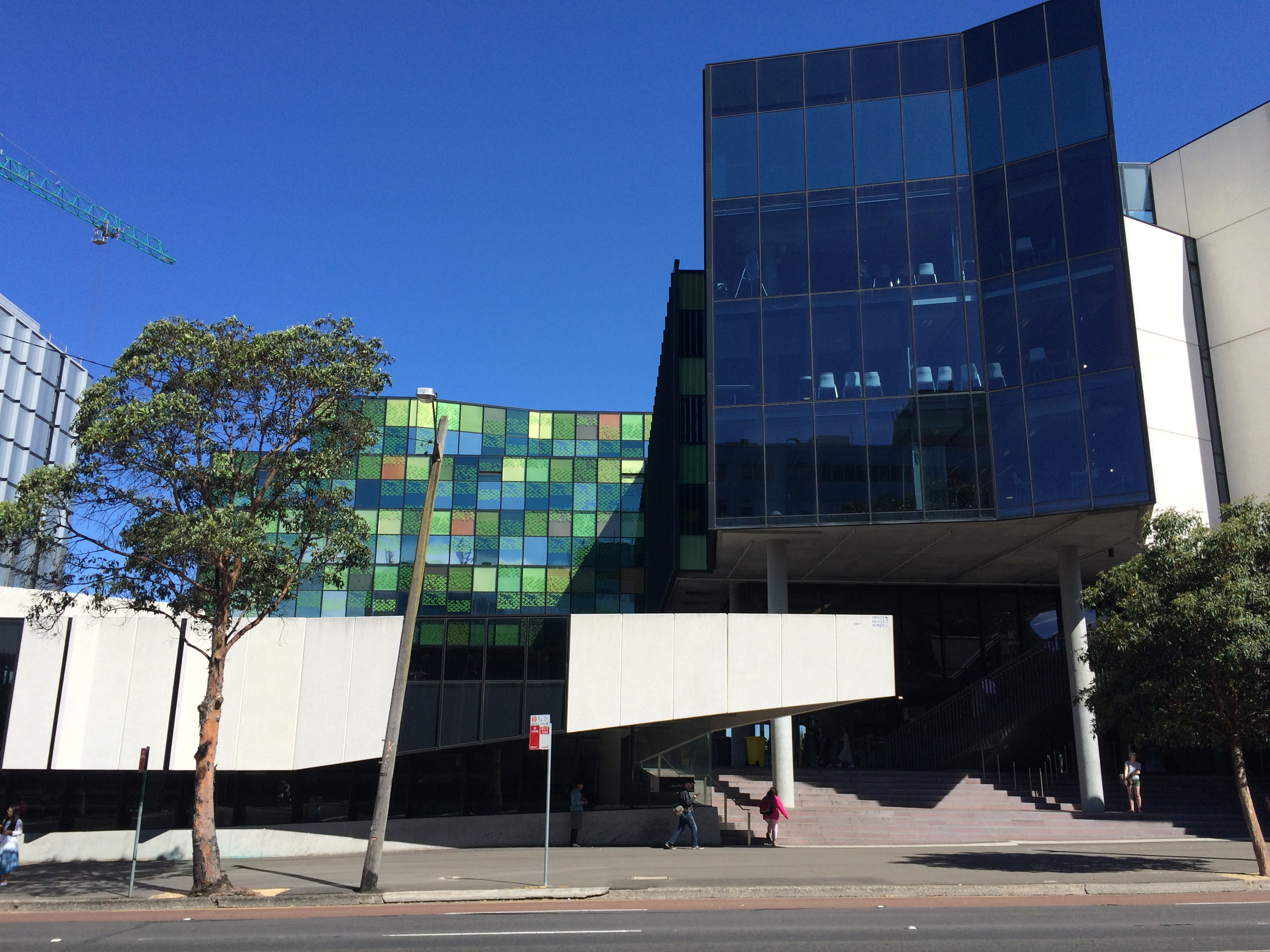
Jane Foss Russell Building (east face)

The Jane Foss Russell Building which is at located in the University of Sydney, commemorates the second woman to gain a Masters of Arts at the University. The building was originally named the Sydney Central but was renamed in 2008.

In addition, Jane Foss Barff has had a memorial prize named in her honour. In 1938 the sum of £50 collected by her friends was donated to the Women's College to create a prize in her memory. The memorial prize is awarded to the student of the College who, in their first or second year, scores highest in the subject of classics.
