= Francis du Pré Oldfield =

English magistrate

Sir Francis du Pré Oldfield (30 June 1869 – 14 February 1928) was an English magistrate who was a judge of the High Court of Judicature, Madras. He was knighted in 1923.

Oldfield was born in Stamford, Lincolnshire, the son of Rev. Canon Charles Oldfield. He was educated at Marlborough College and Trinity College, Cambridge. In 1890, he entered the Indian Civil Service. He became a Joint Magistrate in 1904, a District and Session Judge in Madras in 1908, and Puisne Judge of the High Court of Madras, 1913–24. He retired in 1924 and returned to England, where from 1924 to 1928, he was professor of jurisprudence at the University of Manchester.

He married Frances Sophia Henrietta Cayley, daughter of Sir Richard Cayley. He died of pneumonia in Manchester in 1928.
