= Henry Ebenezer Barff =

Henry Ebenezer Barff GCMG (9 July 1857 – 2 May 1925) was an Australian university administrator and mathematician.

== Early life and education ==
Barff was born on 9 July 1857 on Tahaa Island within the Society Islands. He was the youngest son of Rev. John Barff, a missionary of the London Missionary Society, and Amelia Banes, his mother. In 1865, he and his family moved to Sydney. Later, Barff was educated at Camden College before attending the University of Sydney, where he graduated with honors in mathematics.

== Career ==
Barff joined the University of Sydney in 1879 as an assistant examiner and acting lecturer in mathematics. In 1882, he became the university's registrar and librarian. In 1914, he also served as a university warden. Barff's dedication to his work made him a popular and respected figure at the University. During his tenure, the university grew from a single faculty with few students to ten faculties and over 3,000 students. He was instrumental in the reorganization of the Sydney University Union and authored a historical account of the university published in 1902.

In 1923, Barff was appointed a Companion of the Order of St Michael and St George (C.M.G.). He served in the Senate between 1924-1925.

Barff worked as the university's registrar and librarian until his retirement in 1924.

== Personal life ==
Barff was known to have enjoyed playing golf, serving as a member of the Royal Sydney Golf and University clubs. Barff married Jane Foss in 1899, an advocate for women’s education.

His portrait by John Longstaff is held by the University of Sydney.

== Honours ==
In 1896, Barff became a member of the Royal Society of New South Wales.

- Knight Grand Cross of the Order of St Michael and St George (GCMG), 1923 New Year Honours.

== Bibliography ==
A Short Historical Account of the University of Sydney (1902).
