= Clare Aveling Wiggins =

British physician (1876–1965)

- Born: 5 December 1876; Watlington, Oxfordshire, English
- Died: 7 July 1965 (aged 88); Basingstoke, Hampshire, England
- Education: Magdalen College School, Oxford, St Mary's Hospital, London
- Occupations: Physician, medical administrator, medical missionary, Anglican priest
- Spouse: Ethel Beatrice Elliot (married 1904)
- Children: 4

Clare Aveling Wiggins (5 December 1876 – 7 July 1965) was a British physician, colonial medical administrator, medical missionary, and later in his career, an Anglican priest. Wiggins worked on tropical diseases, including sleeping sickness and leprosy. He served in the Colonial Medical Service (CMS) in Kenya and Uganda from 1901 to 1923, and eventually became the Principal Medical Officer of Uganda. After Wiggins retired, he returned to Uganda as a medical missionary and was the founder of the leprosy treatment facilities, now known as the Kumi Hospital, located in eastern Uganda.

== Early life and education ==
Wiggins was born on 5 December 1876 in Watlington, Oxfordshire, England. He was the son of William Wiggins and the brother of Bernard Henry Wiggins.

Wiggins studied at Magdalen College School in Oxford and did his medical training at St Mary's Hospital in London, where he earned his two qualifications as a physician with the Member of the Royal College of Surgeons (MRCS) and Licentiate of the Royal College of Physicians (LRCP).

== Personal life ==
Wiggins married Ethel Beatrice Elliott in Nairobi on 9 April 1904. Ethel was born in India and was the daughter of Charles Frederick Elliott, who was the Commissioner of Forests. Ethel and Wiggins had four children.

== Career ==
Wiggins medical career began as an Assistant Medical Officer at the Fulham Infirmary in London and as Casualty Officer at St Mary's Hospital.

In 1901, he was appointed Medical Officer to Kenya, where he served in Mombasa, Nairobi, Malindi, Kisumu, and Entebbe.

In 1909, he was transferred to Uganda as a medical officer, where his medical ranking grew. Wiggins served as a Deputy Principal Medical Officer from 1911 to 1919, then as the Principal Medical Officer of Uganda for 12 years, until 1923. During the East African campaign of the First World War, Wiggins was part of the Uganda Medical Service, where he was ranked Major, and served as Officer Commanding Entebbe Base Hospital and was appointed as the Chief Censor in Uganda. After the war, Wiggins was on Uganda's Medical Executive Council (MEC) and Legislative Council (MLC) during his senior administrative year before he retired from government in 1923.

In 1927, Wiggins returned to Uganda under the Church Missionary Society (CMS). He worked closely with the British Empire Leprosy Relief Association (BERLA) and gained support to found pharmacies, an adult leprosy settlement at Ongino, also known as Kumi-Ongino, where 1000 patients were cared for. This leprosy colony became the Kumi Hospital that still operates. In 1930, he founded an additional children's leprosy settlement at Kumi. The locations of the settlements were approximately six miles from the Teso District in Eastern Uganda.

Wiggins returned to Uganda for general missionary relief work in 1938-1939.

== Research and contributions ==
Wiggins's contributions to building programs and developing treatment facilities for infectious cases and children were instrumental to the leprosy control of the settlements. The strategies Wiggins used to reduce leprosy in the Kumi Hospital were combining medical treatment with agricultural work, village-style segregation, and the supervision of daily life.

=== Publications ===
- Wiggins, C.A. "Notes on Sleeping Sickness." The Lancet (1902).
- Wiggins, C.A. "Early days in British East Africa and Uganda". Manuscript, Bodleian Library.
- Wiggins, C A. “Early days in East Africa and Uganda.” East African medical journal vol. 37 (1960): 699-708 contd.
- Wiggins, C A. “Early days in British East Africa and Uganda.” East African medical journal vol. 37 (1960): 780-93.
- Wiggins, C A. “Later work in Uganda.” East African medical journal vol. 38 (1961): 383-90.

== Later life and honours ==
After his work in East Africa, Wiggins returned to England, his homeland. In 1943, he was ordained in the Anglican Church in southern England and as a Vicar of Pyrton with Shirburn, Oxfordshire.

In December 1922, Wiggins was awarded Companion of the Order of St Michael and St George (CMG) in the New Years Honours.

The University of Oxford awarded Wiggins the honorary degree of Master of Arts.

== Death ==
Wiggins died on 7 July 1965 at Basingstoke Hospital, England.
