= Government Dockyard =

- Traditional Chinese: 政府船塢
- Simplified Chinese: 政府船坞
Transcriptions
Standard Mandarin
- Hanyu Pinyin: Zhèngfǔ Chuánwù
Yue: Cantonese
- Jyutping: zing3 fu2 syun4 ou3

Government Dockyard (Chinese: 政府船塢) is a dockyard of Hong Kong Government responsible for the design, procurement and maintenance of all vessels owned by the Government.

The dockyard occupies a site of 98 hectares on the northeast coast of Stonecutters Island in Hong Kong and has an 8.3-hectare protected water basin as an operational base for vessels operated by the Marine Department. The dockyard has a shiplift system and three ship-hoists capable of drydocking vessels of up to 750 tonnes. An on-line computerised information system is employed to co-ordinate the maintenance activities and support services to maximise maintenance efficiency and vessel availability.

The dockyard is adjacent to Stonecutters Island Sewage Treatment Plant is accessible by Ngong Shuen Road.

== Former Tenants ==
This dockyard was the final Tamar shore station prior to the handover and used briefly by the Royal Navy. The base was closed on April 11, 1997, a few months prior to the handover and centenary of HMS Tamar's arrival to Hong Kong.

The base was used to service 3 of the Peacock class patrol ships:

- HMS Peacock
- HMS Plover
- HMS Starling

The ships remained at the decommissioned base before being sold to the Philippine Navy.

== Current tenants ==
List of government departments with vessels serviced here:

- Hong Kong Police launches
- Hong Kong Fire Services fireboats
- Hong Kong Marine Department vessels
- Hong Kong Customs and Excise vessels

== See also ==
- Ngong Shuen Chau Naval Base - PLA base that replaced Tamar
- People's Liberation Army Hong Kong Garrison
- Chinese People's Liberation Army Forces Hong Kong Building - former Tamar shore station
- Central Government Complex, Tamar and Tamar site - location of naval basin for HMS Tamar
