= Admiral Holland (disambiguation) =

Lancelot Holland (1887–1941) was a Royal Navy vice admiral. Admiral Holland may also refer to:

- Cedric Holland (1889–1950), British Royal Navy vice admiral
- Edmund Holland, 4th Earl of Kent (1383–1408), English admiral
- Henry Holland, 3rd Duke of Exeter (1430–1475), English admiral
- John Holland, 1st Duke of Exeter (c. 1352–1400), English admiral
- John Holland, 2nd Duke of Exeter (1395–1447), English admiral
- Michael P. Holland (born 1964), U.S. Navy rear admiral
- Swinton Colthurst Holland (1844–1922), British Royal Navy rear admiral

== See also ==
- Deric Holland-Martin (1906–1977), British Royal Navy admiral
