= Charles Gauntlett Dicken =

Royal Navy admiral (1854–1937)

- Born: 26 April 1854; Bournemouth
- Died: 7 September 1937 (aged 83)
- Allegiance: United Kingdom
- Branch: Royal Navy
- Rank: Admiral
- Commands: HMS Defiance, HMS Royal Arthur, Commodore-in-Charge, Hong Kong

Admiral Charles Gauntlett Dicken (26 April 1854 – 7 September 1937) was a Royal Navy officer. Serving during the late Victorian and Edwardian periods, he took part in the Anglo-Egyptian War, held appointments at the Admiralty, commanded the protected cruiser HMS Royal Arthur, and served as Commodore-in-Charge, Hong Kong during the Russo-Japanese War before retiring from active service in 1908.

== Early life ==
Dicken was born on 26 April 1854 at Westover Villas, Bournemouth. He was the youngest son of the Reverend Alldersey Dicken (1794–1879) and Caroline Mary Huddleston. The family later lived at Norton Rectory near Bury St Edmunds, Suffolk.

He was educated at Ipswich Grammar School before preparing for entry into the Royal Navy at Bell and Johnson's Academy in Southsea. After passing the naval entrance examination at Portsmouth on 10 December 1867, he entered the Royal Navy as a naval cadet aboard HMS Britannia in January 1868. He passed the examinations required for promotion to midshipman in April 1869.

== Naval career ==
=== Early service ===
Dicken's first major deployment came in 1869 when he joined the Flying Squadron, commanded by Rear-Admiral Geoffrey Thomas Phipps Hornby. He sailed from Plymouth aboard HMS Bristol and later transferred at Bahia, Brazil, to HMS Phoebe (1854). The squadron returned to Britain in November 1870 after a long-distance training cruise intended to demonstrate British naval power overseas. Dicken later recorded the voyage in his memoirs.

After returning to Britain, Dicken served aboard HMS Monarch with the Channel Fleet. He subsequently joined HMS Lord Clyde and HMS Lord Warden in the Mediterranean Fleet. He later served on the China Station, including appointments aboard HMS Audacious and other vessels. He was promoted to lieutenant on 8 May 1877.

=== Anglo-Egyptian War ===
Dicken served aboard HMS Invincible during the period of the Russo-Turkish War (1877–1878).

In 1882 he joined HMS Alexandra as torpedo officer. The ship, flagship of the Mediterranean Fleet, took part in the Bombardment of Alexandria on 11 July 1882 during the Anglo-Egyptian War.

For his service during the campaign, Dicken received the Egypt Medal with the Alexandria clasp and the Khedive's Star.

=== Promotion and staff appointments ===
Between 1889 and 1893, Dicken served as second-in-command of HMS Australia. During this period, he participated in the International Naval Review at New York City in 1893.

Dicken was promoted to captain with effect from 1 January 1894. In 1895 he became Assistant Director of the Naval Intelligence Division at the Admiralty. During this period he was offered command of the battleships HMS Hannibal and HMS Bulwark, although neither appointment was taken up.

=== HMS Royal Arthur and overseas service ===
From November 1897 until April 1901, Dicken commanded HMS Royal Arthur, a protected cruiser serving on the China Station.

During this period, HMS Royal Arthur also served on the Australia Station, where Dicken undertook official duties connected with the Royal Navy's presence in the region.

=== Hong Kong command ===
Dicken was appointed Commodore-in-Charge, Hong Kong in October 1903, based at HMS Tamar.

His appointment coincided with the Russo-Japanese War (1904–1905), when Hong Kong served as an important Royal Navy base in East Asia. He was promoted to rear admiral in July 1905 and returned to Britain later that year.

== Retirement and later life ==
Dicken was placed on the retired list as a rear admiral in 1908. He was later promoted to vice-admiral and admiral on the retired list.

During retirement, Dicken lived chiefly in Winchester, where he remained active in civic and charitable affairs, including work connected with Scouting, the Royal British Legion, and the Royal Hampshire County Hospital.

== Family ==
One of Dicken's brothers, Frederick Rowland Dicken, also served in the Royal Navy and later reached the rank of captain.

Dicken married Margaret Christiena Cornish on 14 October 1880. Following her death in 1888, he married Ada Mary Byron on 9 June 1894.

Several of his sons followed naval careers. His son Edward Bernard Cornish Dicken became a Royal Navy rear admiral, was appointed Commander of the Order of the British Empire, and received the Distinguished Service Cross.

Another son, John Aldersey Dicken, served in the Royal Navy and retired as a lieutenant commander.

== Death ==
Charles Gauntlett Dicken died on 7 September 1937 at the age of 83.
