= George Neville (Royal Navy officer) =

Royal Navy Admiral (1850–1923)

Admiral Sir George Neville KCB CVO
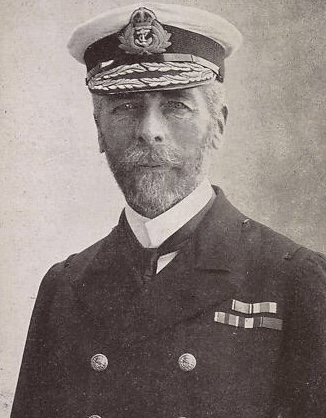
- George Neville, c. 1906

Admiral Sir George Neville, KCB, CVO (18 March 1850 – 5 February 1923) was a Royal Navy officer. His career was associated with that of Prince Alfred, Duke of Edinburgh, with whom he served in six ships over two decades.

== Life and career ==
The second son of Ralph Neville-Grenville MP, George Neville entered HMS Britannia as a cadet in June 1863.

He was appointed in command of the HMS Australia, coast guard ship for Southampton Water, on 20 January 1900, serving as such until 23 November 1902. Australia escorted the royal yacht HMY Osborne when Queen Victoria visited Ireland in April 1900, and in September the following year she visited Germany and Denmark when she escorted the royal yacht carrying King Edward VII from Hamburg to Elsinore. For his service to the King during the 1901 tour, he was appointed a Member (fourth class) of the Royal Victorian Order (MVO) in October 1901. He also commanded her for the fleet review held at Spithead on 16 August 1902 for the coronation of King Edward VII.

He was promoted to admiral in 1912, and retired at his own request in 1913.

His obituary in The Times described him as "a typical naval officer—alert and efficient, trusted and capable, cheeful and popular, and enthusiastic throughout his career."
