= Chinese People's Liberation Army Forces Hong Kong Building =

Headquarters of the Hong Kong Garrison

- 中國人民解放軍駐香港部隊大廈
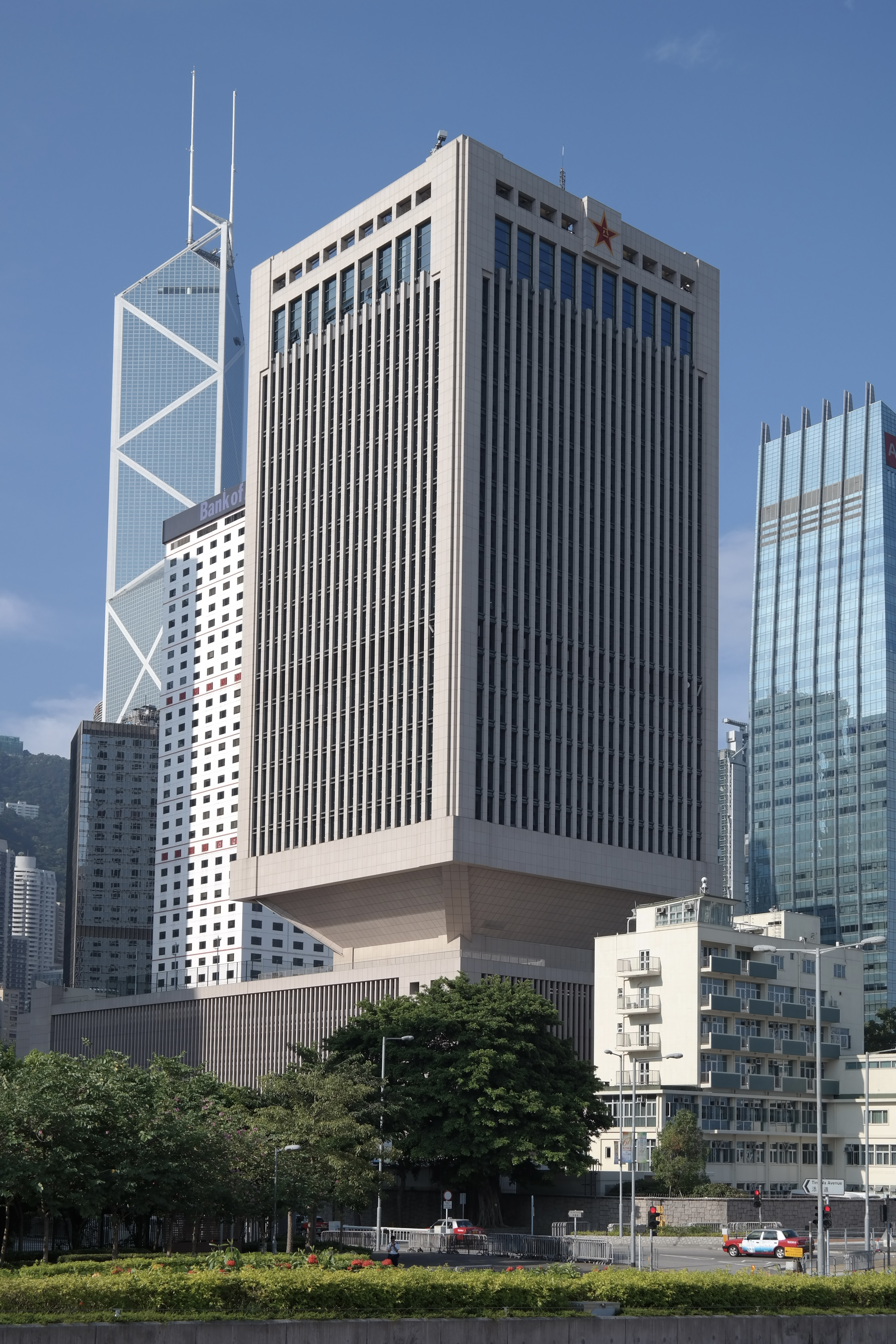
- The building on 14 October 2016
- Interactive map of the Chinese People's Liberation Army Forces Hong Kong Building area
- Former names: Prince of Wales Building

General information
- Status: Completed
- Type: Military
- Location: Hong Kong
- Coordinates: 22°16′54″N 114°9′51″E
- Completed: 1979; 47 years ago

Height
- Roof: 113 m (371 ft)

Technical details
- Floor count: 28

Chinese People's Liberation Army Forces Hong Kong Building

Chinese People's Liberation Army Forces Hong Kong Building
- Traditional Chinese: 中國人民解放軍駐香港部隊大廈
- Simplified Chinese: 中国人民解放军驻香港部队大厦
Transcriptions
Standard Mandarin
- Hanyu Pinyin: Zhōngguó Rénmín Jiěfàngjūn Zhù Xiānggǎng Bùduì Dàshà
Yue: Cantonese
- Yale Romanization: jūng gwok yàhn màhn gáai fong gwān jyu hēung góng bouh deuih daaih haah
- Jyutping: Zung1 gwok3 jan4 man4 gaai2 fong3 gwan1 zyu3 hoeng1 gong2 bou6 deoi4 daai6 haa6

Prince of Wales Building
- Traditional Chinese: 威爾斯親王大廈
- Simplified Chinese: 威尔斯亲王大厦
Transcriptions
Standard Mandarin
- Hanyu Pinyin: Wēiěrsī Qīnwáng Dàshà
Yue: Cantonese
- Yale Romanization: Wāi yíh sī chān wòhng daaih haah
- Jyutping: Wai1 ji5 si1 can1 wong4 daai6 haa6

The Chinese People's Liberation Army Forces Hong Kong Building, formerly known as the Prince of Wales Building, is the headquarters building of the People's Liberation Army Hong Kong Garrison, located on Lung Wui Road, Admiralty, Hong Kong Island, Hong Kong. It houses the Central Barracks of the Hong Kong Garrison.

It is a 113-metre (371 ft) tall, 28-floor building located within the former HMS Tamar naval base.

== History ==
Constructed in 1979, the building was named the Prince of Wales Building. It housed the head office of the Royal Navy stationed in Hong Kong until the territory's handover from the United Kingdom (British colony) to the People's Republic of China (SAR of China) on 1 July 1997 when it was made the head office of the PLA Hong Kong Garrison. In May 2000, the Legislative Council of Hong Kong passed the Military Installations Closed Areas (Amendment) Order 2000, which renamed the former Prince of Wales Barracks to Central Barracks, and the Prince of Wales Building to the Chinese People's Liberation Army Forces Hong Kong Building. After the base became the Central Barracks, the old name of the building remained visible in large raised letters along the bottom of the tower for several years. The building underwent a 20-month full renovation, completed in 2014, during which most of the troops were transferred to the Stonecutters Island base.

Due to its distinctive shape, likened to a wineglass, the building stands out from the rest of the Admiralty waterfront buildings. Architects attribute the shape of the building to passive protection, its narrow stem with the protruding upper storeys, supposedly makes it difficult to climb or attack. It is also informally known as 'the upside-down Gin bottle' due to its shape resembling a bottle of Gordon's Gin. The corner of the building at the podium level which faces east (towards Admiralty MTR station) used to be a chapel under British use of the barracks. There used to be a crucifix visible on the exterior—however, during external refurbishment (including replacing the "Prince of Wales Building" (Chinese: 威爾斯親王大廈) inscription in English with its current name in Chinese) in 2001, the cross was removed. This was despite initial claims the cross would be retained.

== People's Liberation Army in Hong Kong ==
The PLA maintains a number of garrisons in the Hong Kong Special Administrative Region. In addition to the PLA Forces Hong Kong Building, there are notable garrisons at the Stonecutters Island, and at Stanley Fort. Soldiers located at these three garrisons are considered to be the élite of the PLA. The soldiers are not permitted to leave their compounds, even during off-duty times to mingle with the local populace. As a restricted area, the PLA Forces Hong Kong Building is heavily guarded by soldiers with automatic rifles.

== Gallery ==
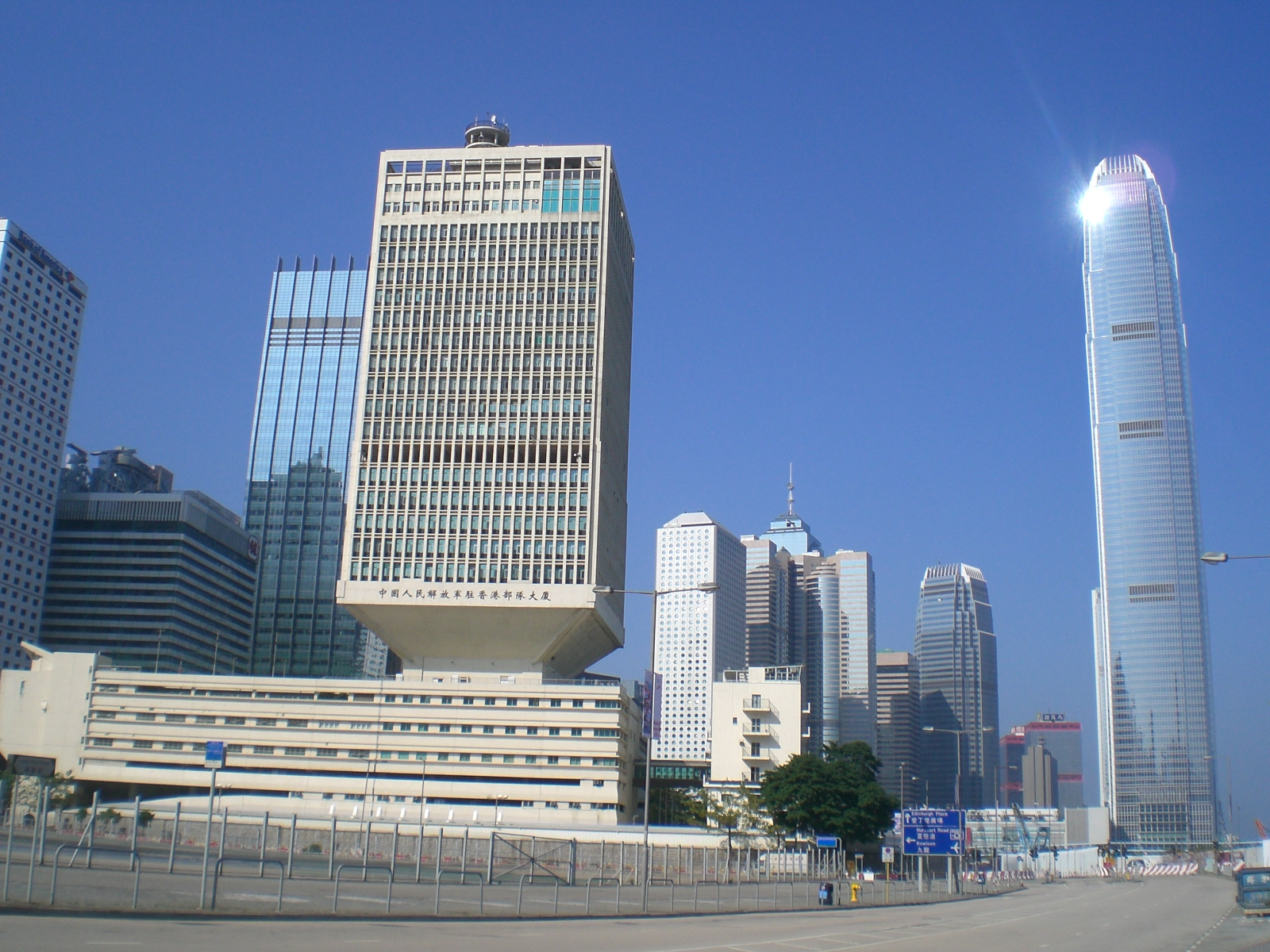
Tim Mei Avenue, facing west. Buildings from left to right: Bank of America Tower, Hutchison Whampoa Building, AIG Tower, PLA Forces Hong Kong Building, Jardine House, Exchange Square Towers 1 & 2, The Center (The antenna at the very background), Exchange Square Tower 3, 1 IFC, ---, 2 IFC, 26 December 2007

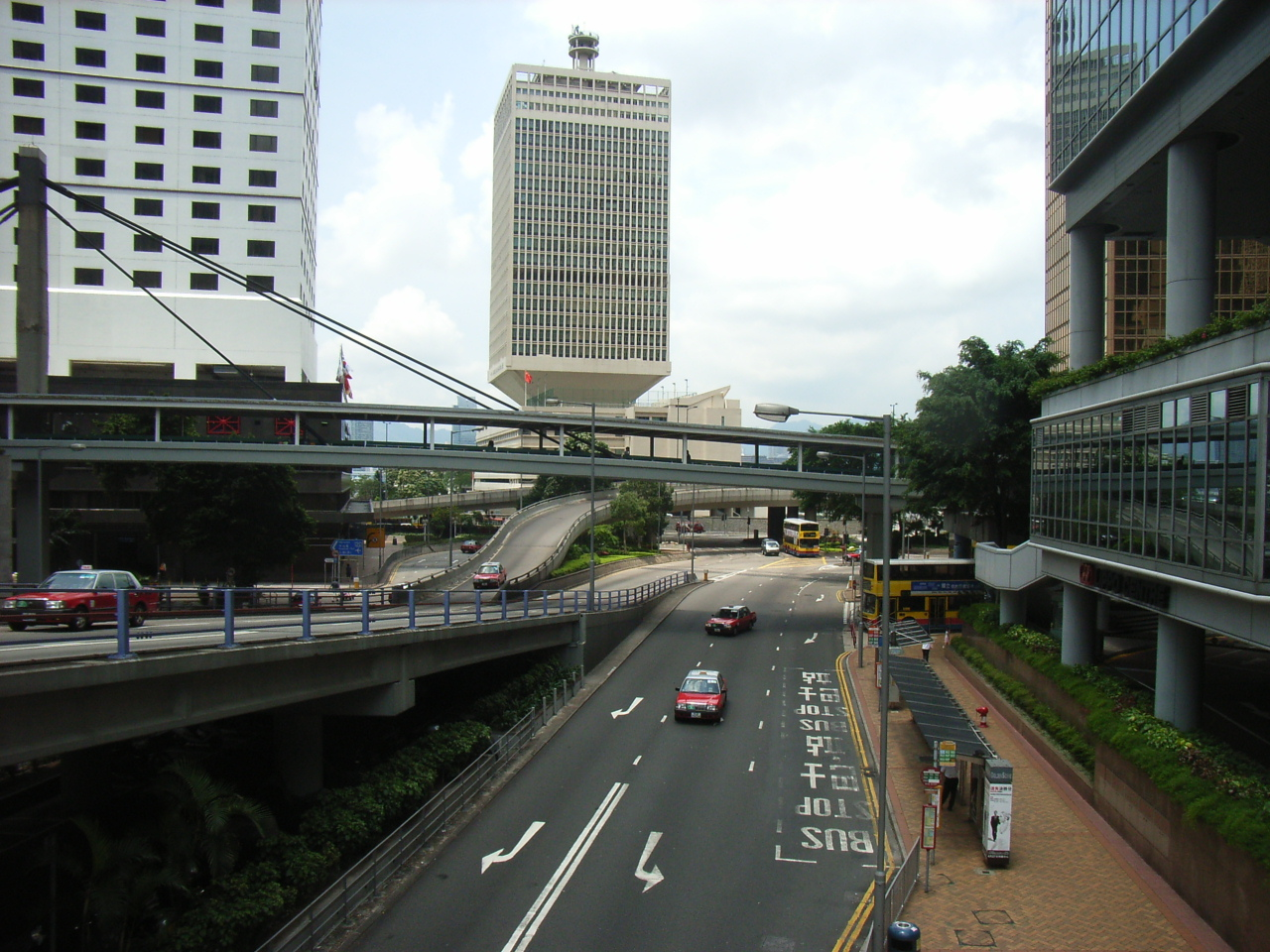
Cotton Tree Drive, facing north east. Buildings from left to right: Bank of America Tower, PLA Forces Hong Kong Building, Lippo Centre Tower 1 (right most) and Far East Finance Center (behind Lippo Centre), 7 May 2006

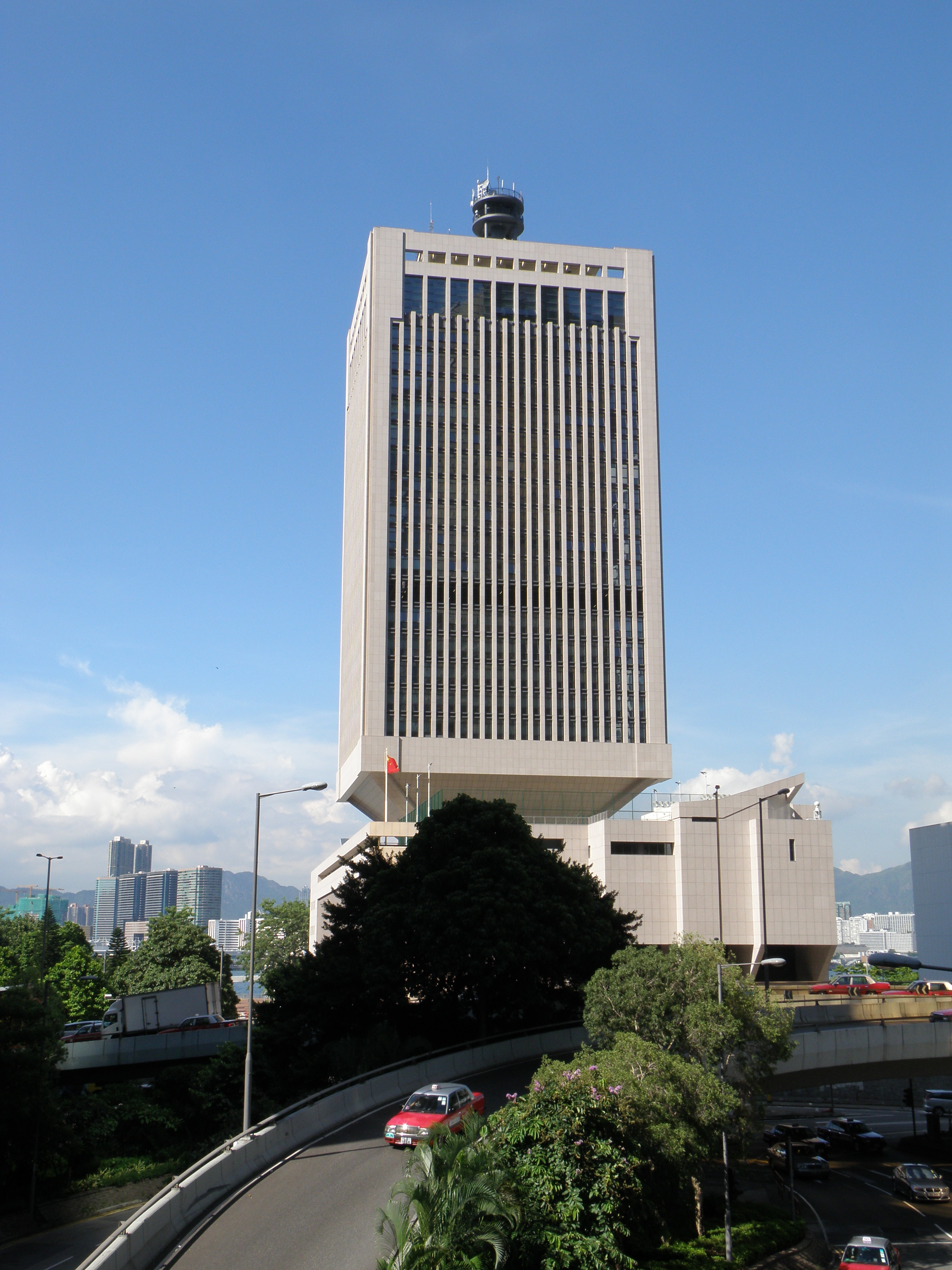
The building on 2 September 2014

== See also ==
- People's Liberation Army Hong Kong Garrison
- List of buildings and structures in Hong Kong
- Stanley Fort
- British Forces Overseas Hong Kong
  - Military of Hong Kong under British rule (Category)
