= Swinton Colthurst Holland =

Royal Navy Admiral (1844–1922)

Admiral Swinton Colthurst Holland JP FRGS
- Born: 8 February 1844
- Died: 8 June 1922 (aged 78)
- Relatives: Vice Admiral Cedric Holland (son)
- Military career
- Allegiance: United Kingdom
- Branch: Royal Navy
- Service years: 1857–1908
- Rank: Admiral
- Commands: Chatham Dockyard (1899–1902); Commodore-in-Charge, Hong Kong (1896–99); HMS Australia (1891–93)

Admiral Swinton Colthurst Holland (8 February 1844 – 8 June 1922) was a Royal Navy officer who served as Commodore in Charge at Hong Kong from 1896 to 1899, and as Admiral-Superintendent of Chatham dockyard form 1899 to 1902.

== Naval career ==
Holland was born on 8 February 1844 and, after an initial education at Windlesham House School, joined the Royal Navy in 1857. He was captain of HMS Australia and in charge of the Medway Fleet reserve, before he was appointed Commodore-in-Charge, Hong Kong in 1896. He was promoted to flag rank as rear admiral on 1 January 1899, and in September that year was appointed Admiral-superintendent of Chatham dockyard, serving as such for three years until 2 September 1902.

Holland was promoted to vice-admiral on 30 August 1903, and admiral on 1 June 1907, before retiring the following year in April 1908.

== Family ==
Holland married Eva Williams. Among their children was Vice Admiral Cedric Holland.

Military offices
Preceded by Captain George Thomas Henry Boyes	Commodore in charge of Hong Kong; 1896–1899	Succeeded by Captain Francis Powell
Preceded by Rear-Admiral Hilary Gustavus Andoe	Admiral-Superintendent of Chatham Dockyard; 1899–1902	Succeeded by Vice-Admiral Robert William Craigie
