= Robert William Craigie =

Royal Navy Admiral; Admiral Superintendent of Chatham Dockyard (1849–1911)

Admiral Robert William Craigie
- Born: 25 July 1849
- Died: 21 August 1911 (aged 62)
- Military career
- Allegiance: United Kingdom
- Branch: Royal Navy
- Service years: 1863–1908
- Rank: Admiral
- Commands: Chatham Dockyard; HMS Cambridge
- Conflicts: Anglo-Zulu War

Admiral Robert William Craigie (25 July 1849 – 21 August 1911) was a Royal Navy officer who served as Admiral-Superintendent of Chatham Dockyard from 1902 to 1905.

== Biography ==
Craigie was born on 25 July 1849, and joined the Royal Navy in 1863. He was captain of the gunnery school HMS Cambridge off Plymouth from 1898 to 1900, in which year he was promoted to flag rank as rear-admiral on 10 August 1900.

In July 1902 he was announced as the new Admiral-superintendent of Chatham Dockyard, and he took up the position on 2 September 1902, when he hoisted his flag on HMS Algiers, flagship of the Dockyard reserve. He served at Chatham for three years, and retired as an admiral in 1908.

Military offices
Preceded by Rear-Admiral Swinton Colthurst Holland	Admiral-Superintendent of Chatham Dockyard; 1902–1905	Succeeded by Rear-Admiral Alvin Coote Corry
