= Francis Powell (Royal Navy officer) =

Royal Navy Admiral (1849–1927)

Admiral Sir Francis Powell KCMG CB
- Born: 15 September 1849
- Died: 5 October 1927 (aged 78)
- Military career
- Allegiance: United Kingdom
- Branch: Royal Navy
- Service years: 1863–1907
- Rank: Admiral
- Commands: HMS Tamar (1899–1902); HMS Mars (1898); HMS Crescent (1895–97); HMS Phoebe (1892–95)
- Conflicts: Benin Expedition of 1897; Boxer Rebellion
- Awards: Knight Commander of the Order of St Michael and St George; Companion of the Order of the Bath

Admiral Sir Francis Powell, KCMG, CB (15 September 1849 – 5 October 1927) was a Royal Navy officer who served as Commodore-in-Charge at Hong Kong from 1899 to 1902, during the Boxer Rebellion.

== Naval career ==
Powell was born in 1849. After being educated at Bradfield College he joined the Royal Navy. He was promoted to lieutenant on 6 February 1872, to commander in 1883, and to captain on 30 June 1889.

Powell was in command of the cruiser HMS Phoebe from 1892 to 1895, while she served on the Cape and West Africa Station, and was appointed a Companion of the Order of the Bath on 21 December 1894 for services during military operations in Benin earlier that year. The operations included combined forces from the Royal Navy and Niger Coast Protectorate against the Kingdom of Benin, and Powell took part in the capture of the trading town of Ebrohimi. He transferred to command of the first class cruiser HMS Crescent from 1895 to 1897, then was appointed in command of the battleship HMS Mars on 5 January 1898, serving in the Channel Fleet. After only a year, he was transferred to Hong Kong, where on 5 January 1899 he took command as commodore-in-charge stationed at HMS Tamar. He served in Hong Kong for three years, leaving in early 1902. During these years the Boxer Rebellion took place in China, and the base at Hong Kong was more important for the navy than earlier. For his service in China he was appointed a Knight Commander of the Order of St Michael and St George in the Coronation Honours list published on 26 June 1902, and knighted by King Edward VII on board HMY Victoria and Albert outside Cowes on 15 August 1902.

Powell was promoted to flag rank as rear admiral on 1 January 1903, to vice-admiral on 8 February 1907, and retired from the navy at his own request five days later, on 13 February. He was advanced to admiral on the retired list on 12 April 1911.

Military offices
Preceded by Captain Swinton Colthurst Holland	Commodore in charge of Hong Kong; 1899–1902	Succeeded by Captain Charles Grey Robinson
