= Ngong Shuen Chau Naval Base =

Chinese naval base in Hong Kong

- Hong Kong; Stonecutter's Island
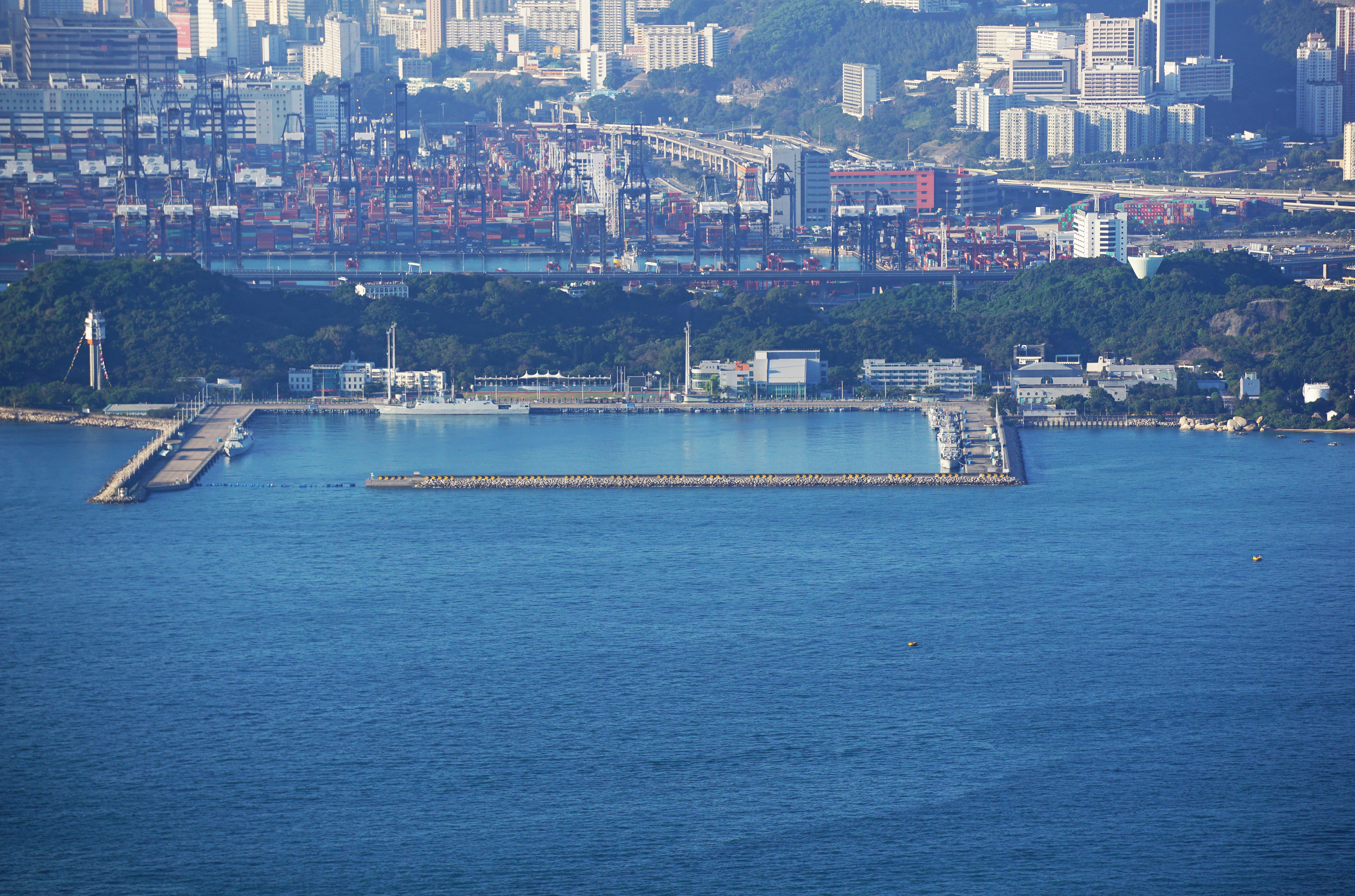

Site information
- Type: Naval base
- Controlled by: People's Liberation Army Navy

Location
- Coordinates: 22°19′20″N 114°8′10″E

Site history
- Built: 1997
- In use: 1997 – Present

Garrison information
- Past commanders: Major General Zhang Shibo
- Garrison: People's Liberation Army Hong Kong Garrison, South Sea Fleet, Southern Theater Command

Ngong Shuen Chau Naval Base
- Traditional Chinese: 昂船洲海軍基地
- Simplified Chinese: 昂船洲海军基地
Transcriptions
Standard Mandarin
- Hanyu Pinyin: Ángchuánzhōu Hǎijūn Jīdì
Yue: Cantonese
- Jyutping: ngong5 syun4 zau1 hoi2 gwan1 gei1 dei6

Ngong Shuen Chau Naval Base (Chinese: 昂船洲海軍基地) is part of the People's Liberation Army Hong Kong Garrison and small naval base on Stonecutters Island (Ngong Shuen Chau), Hong Kong. It is a sub-base of the South Sea Fleet and home to a naval squadron of the Hong Kong Garrison (MUCD 38081). The area surrounding the base is off limits to civilian ship traffic.

== History ==
The naval base was built by the contractors during the handover period in 1996–1997 and one of a few military installations that was not transferred from the British. The naval base is located on the South Shore of the former Stonecutter's Island and located south of the former HMS Tamar (now the Government Dockyard). Most of the facility was created from dredging and in-fill project in the early 1990s in anticipation of the move of Tamar and the handover. The older buildings and recreation facilities were inherited from the Hong Kong Military Service Corps. Many buildings in the base date to the 1930s, but some are as far back as the 1870s.

A list of historic buildings at the naval facility:

- Navy, Army and Air Force Institutes
- Lido - recreation facilities including a pool
- Building # 31 - South Shore
- Building # 23 (old Fire Station) - South Shore
- Building # 25 - South Shore
- Ferry Waiting Room
- Shaffies Curry House - South Shore
- Old Military Prison
- Colchester Road
- Didcot Road
- Upside-Down House (#24 South Shore)
- Ammunition Depot and Bunkers
- Sub Ammo Depot
- Married Quarters
- LEP/HKMSC Medical Centre
- Barracks #25 - built 1905
- Old Centurion Battery
- Western Battery
- Eastern Battery
- Watch Towers
- South Shore Gun Battery
- Armament Depot
- Officer's Mess
- Old Watch Tower 1870
- Wuthering Height's Quarters
- St Barbara's Garrison Church
- East Pier
- Transmitting Station
- Receiving Station
- Central Battery

Roads within the base once had British names, but they have since been dropped:

- Colchester Road
- Didcot Road

The most high-profile visitor to the base was Hu Jintao in 2007.

== Ships ==
Various ships of the People's Liberation Army Navy visit the base, but only a few ships remain on semi-permanent basis.

Class or name	Builder	Type	Quantity	Year Entered Service	Details	Photos
Type 056 JIangdao class	Huangpu Shipyard, Guangzhou, China	Corvette	2	2013	596 惠州 / Huizhou 597 钦州 / Qinzhou: 1 × AK-176 76 mm. gun; 2 × 30 mm. cannon; 2× 2-cell YJ-83 anti-ship missiles, amidships; 1 × 8-cell FL-3000N SAM launcher; 2 × triple 324 mm. torpedo tubes	PLAN Huizhou escorting the Liaoning into Lamma Channel
Type 074-II Yuhai class	Wuhu Shipyard of Wuhu, Anhui China	Medium Landing Ship	3	2017-8	3357, 3358, and 3359 Two 25 mm guns	
Type 721	Guangxi Guiyang shipyard.	Light transport boat	2	1990s	42 meters long, 8.8 meters wide and 2.14 meters tall. It has a full displacement of 140 tons, a speed of 33 knots and a maximum range of 300 nautical miles. It can carry 70 people and 2 tons of materials.	

== Facilities ==
Like the last HMS Tamar, Ngong Shuen Chau is a low-frills and low key naval facility.

Access to the base is made via Chi Ngong Road, but access into the naval yard is restricted and surrounding areas fenced off. A heavily wooded area to the north protects the base from unwanted visitors.

- basin and concrete berthing facility
- naval barracks
- exercise track
- parade grounds
- numerous low-rise naval buildings
- Ngong Shuen Chau Naval Base Theatre

During the summer months the base is open to the public, but otherwise closed during most of the year.
