= HMS Tamar (shore station) =

Royal Navy base in Hong Kong, 1897–1997

Coordinates: 22°16′51″N 114°9′56″E

- Stonecutter's Island, Hong Kong
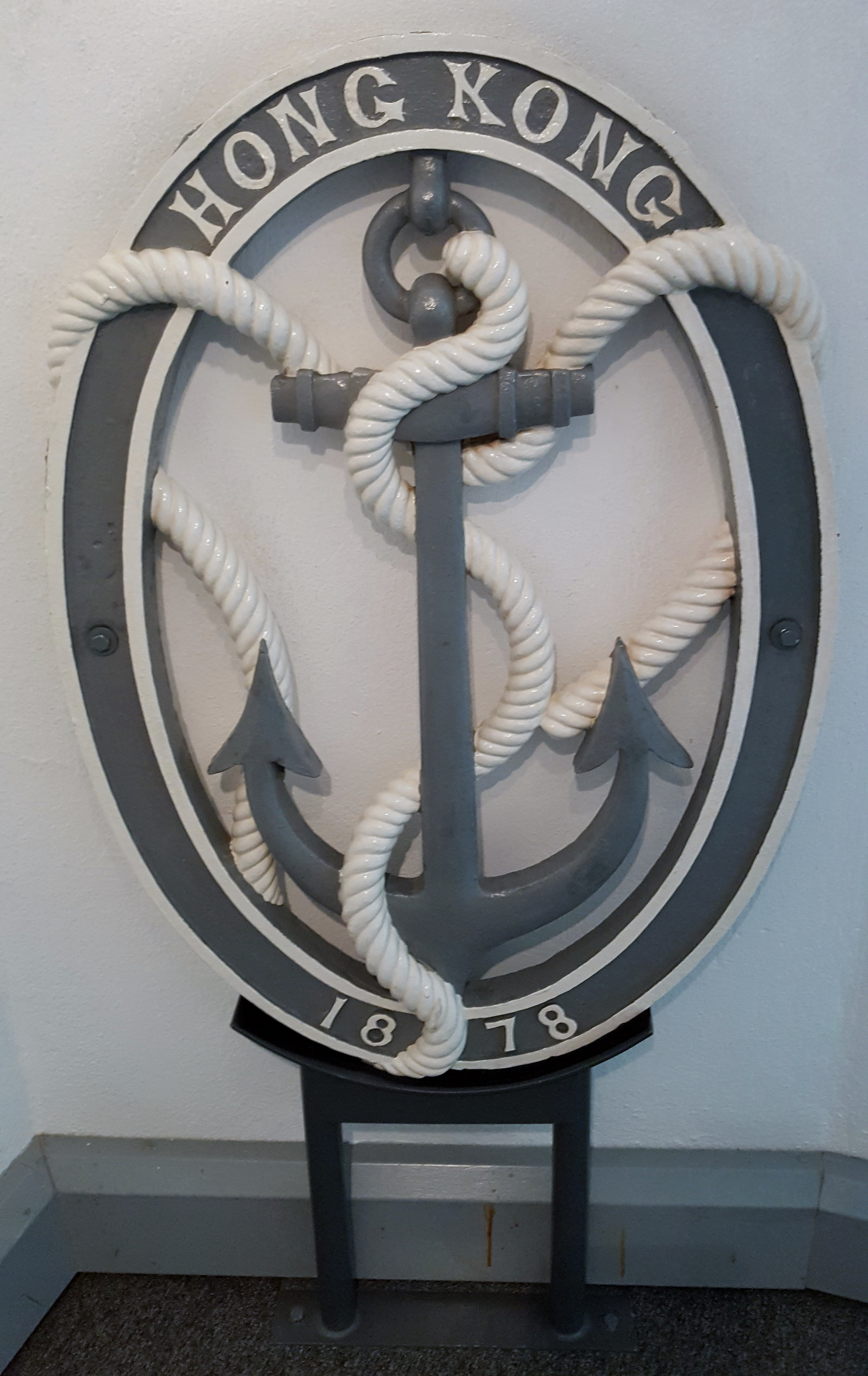
- Gate emblem

Site information
- Type: Naval base
- Controlled by: RN

Site history
- Built: 1897–1997
- In use: 1897–1997
- Battles/wars: Battle of Hong Kong 1941

Garrison information
- Past commanders: Commodore-in-Charge, Hong Kong
- Garrison: British Forces Overseas Hong Kong (naval)

HMS Tamar
- Traditional Chinese: 添馬艦
Transcriptions
Yue: Cantonese
- Jyutping: tim1 maa5 laam6

HMS Tamar (Chinese: 添馬艦) was the name for the British Royal Navy's base in Hong Kong from 1897 to 1997. It took its name from HMS Tamar, a ship that was used as the base until replaced by buildings ashore.

== History ==
=== 19th century ===
The British Navy arrived during the First Opium War to protect the opium traders. Sir Edward Belcher, aboard HMS Sulphur landed in Hong Kong on 25 January 1841. Possession Street still exists to mark the event, although its Chinese name is 水坑口街 ("Mouth of the ditch Street").

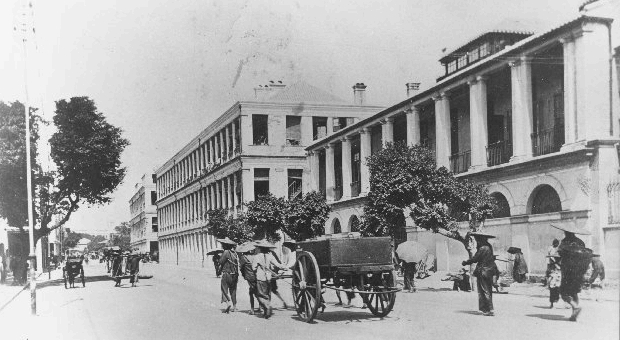
Naval Dockyard buildings (centre), Queen's Road, 1894

Commodore Sir Gordon Bremer raised the Union Jack and claimed Hong Kong as a colony on 26 January 1841. Naval store sheds were erected there in April 1841. The site had been referred to as the "HM Victualling Yard" in the Navy's own register. The first naval storekeeper and agent victualler, Thomas McKnight, appointed on 21 March 1842, served until October 1849. Early maps show that major construction was also carried out at another, slightly more westward site, between 1845 and 1855. In fact, the naval authorities demolished the West Point store sheds and surrendered the land to the colonial government in 1854 in exchange for a plot of land where the Admiralty station of the Mass Transit Railway stands.

The Second Opium War in China (1856–1860) caused a military build-up, in which the yard expanded westwards in April 1858. A victualling yard was added at what was then the North Barracks. Two officers were initially appointed as responsible for the machinery and spare parts, respectively, needed to maintain and repair ships in the dockyard, and for dry goods and foodstuff in the victualling yard.

HMS Tamar, was a 3,650-ton British troopship laid down in 1862 and launched in 1863. She first visited Hong Kong in 1878 with relief crews, returned once in 1886. She finally arrived in Victoria City on 11 April 1897. She was stationed permanently in the harbour from 1897 to 1941, when she was scuttled during the Battle of Hong Kong during World War II, to avoid being used by the invading Japanese Imperial forces.

=== 20th century ===
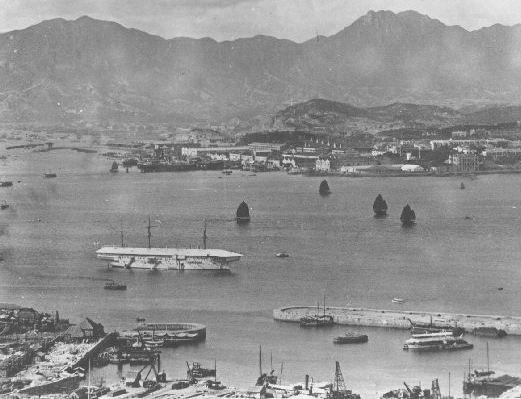
HMS Tamar (white vessel) anchored off the Naval Dockyard (1905)

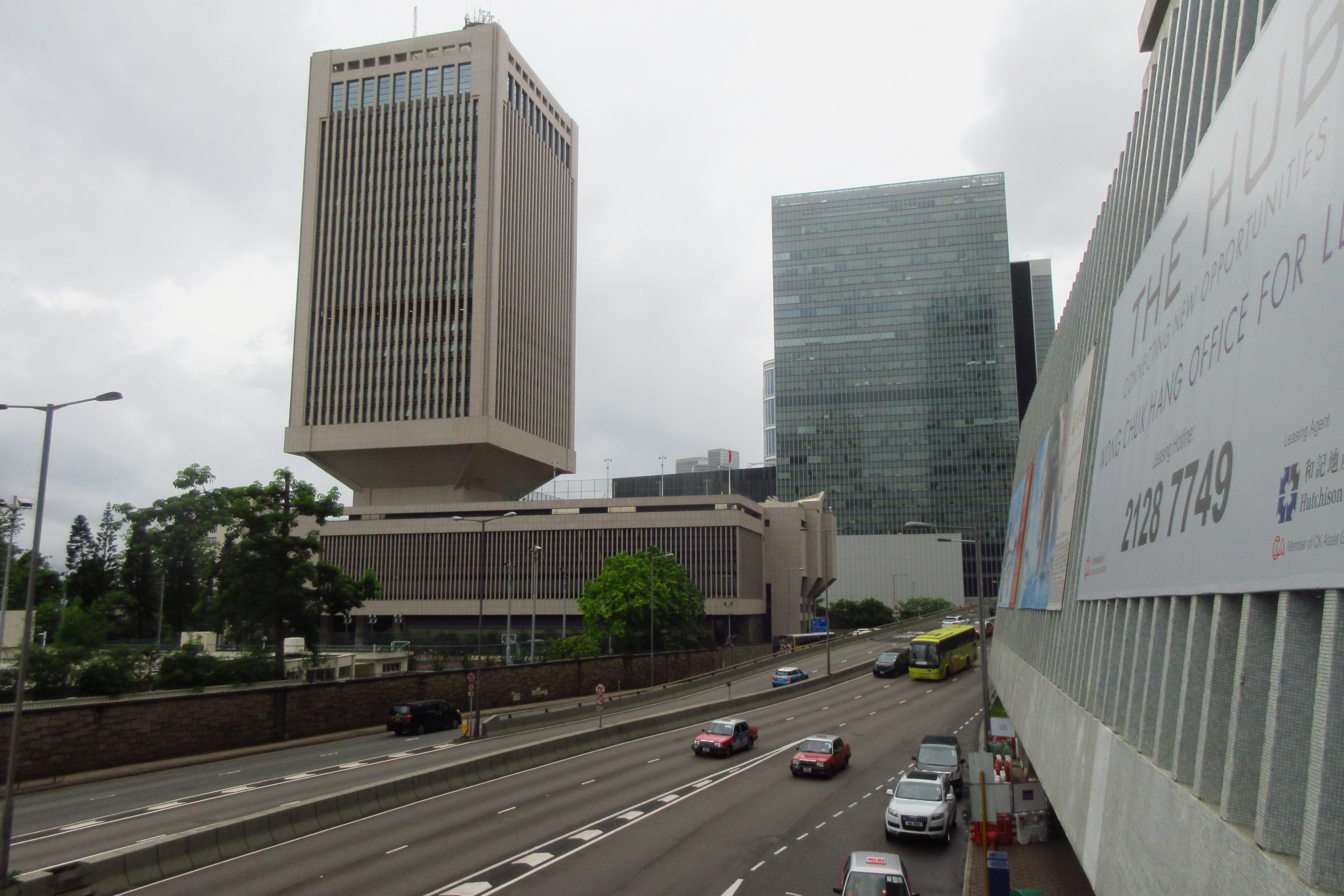
The former Prince of Wales Building, the main headquarters building of HMS Tamar from 1978 to 1997

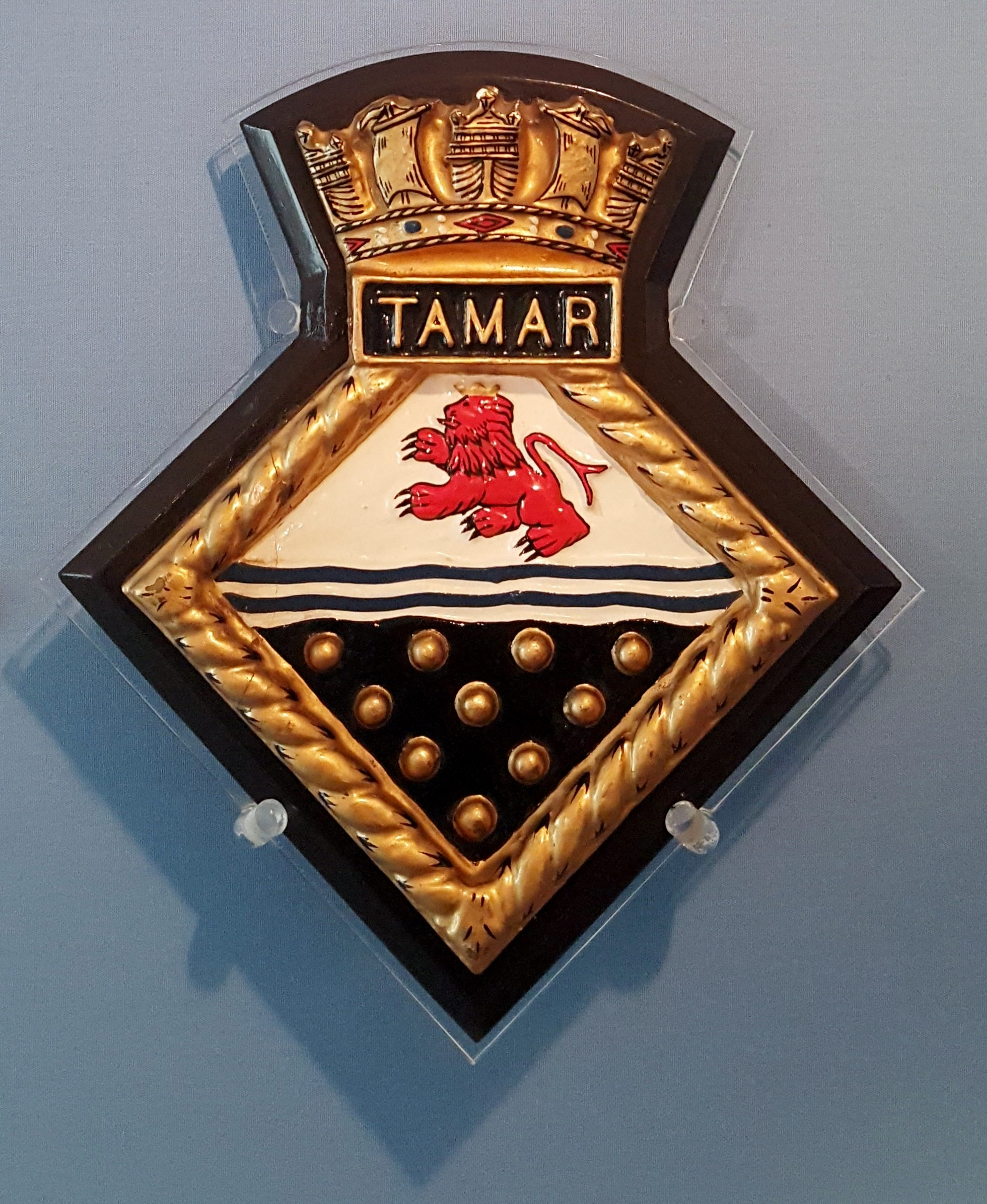
A plaque engraved with the crest of HMS Tamar. Collected by Hong Kong Museum of Coastal Defence

At the turn of the 20th century, land adjacent to the site was needed for expansion. Unable to obtain it, as the site was surrounded by army barracks, the Navy began work on the construction of a floating basin (sheltered bay) and the reclamation of the east arm of the dockyard, in 1902. This project, involving 160,000 square metres of land reclamation, a 36,000 square metre floating basin to repair and refit vessels afloat, and also a 183-metre graving dock, was completed by 1908.

At the end of World War II, the Royal Navy re-established their naval base at Wellington Barracks, vacated by the British Army.

On 28 November 1957, the Navy announced that the dockyard would be closed down over a 2-year period. However, in 1959, the Navy, which had retained some land on the waterfront, began planning a compact naval base on the site.

From 1959 to 1962, the Wellington Barracks were upgraded to better serve the colony and reflect the changing times for the Royal Navy in the Pacific region. Old naval buildings were demolished, and the rubble used as landfill for the reclamation of the dry dock in October 1959.

The Royal Navy decided to demolish the Wellington Barracks and build a modern naval facility in Hong Kong. The Prince of Wales Building was completed in 1978 and became the headquarters of the new naval base, HMS Tamar.

Shortly before the departure of British forces in 1997, the Tamar basin was reclaimed, and the People's Liberation Army of the People's Republic of China occupied the Prince of Wales Building (now Chinese People's Liberation Army Forces Hong Kong Building, or collectively with other buildings and the area enclosed by walls, the Central Barracks).

HM Naval Base was relocated to the northern side of Stonecutter's Island, off Kowloon, prior to the handover in 1997. On 11 April 1997, just over a hundred years since HMS Tamar's definitive arrival for service as a base depot ship (the Tamar had arrived in Hong Kong for conversion on 30 September 1895) and just under a century after her commissioning on 1 October 1897, the British naval shore establishment in Hong Kong was de-commissioned.

The last HMS Tamar on Stonecutters Island is now a government marine facility, now known as the Government Dockyard. The vacated site in Central, Hong Kong Central, now known as the Tamar site, became a valuable piece of real estate and after much debate as to how to best use the site has now become the location of the new Hong Kong Government's Central Government Complex.

== Administration ==
=== Commodore-in-Charge, Hong Kong ===
Post holders included:

- Commodore Oliver J. Jones: March 1866 – December 1869
- Commodore John A.P. Price: December 1869 – September 1870
- Commodore Francis H. Shortt: September 1870 – August 1873
- Commodore John E. Parish: August 1873 – March 1876
- Commodore George W. Watson: March 1876 – March 1879
- Commodore Thomas E. Smith: March 1879 – May 1881
- Commodore William H. Cuming: May 1881 – February 1884
- Commodore George Digby Morant: February 1884 – February 1887
- Commodore William H. Maxwell: February 1887 – December 1888
- Commodore Edmund J. Church: December 1888 – December 1891
- Commodore Henry St.L. Bury Palliser: December 1891 – June 1893
- Commodore George T.H. Boyes: June 1893 – July 1896
- Commodore Swinton C. Holland: July 1896 – March 1899
- Commodore Francis Powell: March 1899 – March 1902
- Commodore Charles G. Robinson: March 1902 – February 1904
- Commodore Charles Gauntlett Dicken: February 1904 – September 1905
- Commodore Hugh P. Williams: September 1905 – April 1907
- Commodore Robert H.S. Stokes: April 1907 – October 1908
- Commodore Herbert Lyon: October 1908 – July 1910
- Commodore Cresswell J. Eyres: July 1910 – July 1912
- Rear-Admiral Robert H. Anstruther: July 1912 – May 1916 (as Rear-Admiral-in-Charge, Hong Kong)
- Commodore Henry G.G. Sandeman: May 1916 – May 1918
- Commodore Victor G. Gurner: May 1918 – June 1920
- Commodore William Bowden-Smith: June 1920 – June 1922
- Commodore Henry E. Grace: June 1922 – October 1924
- Commodore Anselan J.B.Stirling: October 1924 – November 1926
- Commodore John L. Pearson: November 1926 – October 1928
- Commodore Richard A. S. Hill: October 1928 – November 1930
- Commodore Arthur H. Walker: November 1930 – August 1932
- Commodore Edward McC. W. Lawrie: August 1932 – June 1933
- Commodore Frank Elliott: July 1933 – April 1935
- Commodore Cyril G.Sedgwick: April 1935 – April 1937
- Commodore Edward B.C.Dicken: April 1937 – April 1939
- Commodore Arthur M. Peters: April 1939 – November 1940 (as Commodore-in-Charge, Naval Establishments, Hong Kong)
- Commodore Alfred C. Collinson: November 1940 – December 1941
- Commodore Douglas H. Everett: August 1945 – June 1947
- Commodore Charles L. Robertson: June 1947 – June 1949
- Commodore Leslie N. Brownfield: June 1949 – July 1951
- Commodore Harold G. Dickinson: July 1951 – July 1953
- Commodore Anthony H. Thorold: July 1953 – June 1955
- Commodore John H. Unwin: June 1955 – March 1957
- Commodore G. David A. Gregory: March 1957 – April 1960
- Commodore Adrian R.L. Butler: April 1960 – October 1962
- Commodore George O.Symonds: November 1962 – February 1965
- Commodore Frank D. Holford: February 1965 – January 1967
- Commodore Thomas H.P. Wilson: January 1967 – October 1968
- Commodore Philip R.C. Higham: October 1968 – July 1970
- Commodore Roger E.S. Wykes-Sneyd: July 1970 – August 1972
- Commodore John K. Stevens: August 1972 – August 1973
- Commodore John A.G. Evans: August 1973 – October 1975

=== Captain-in-Charge, Hong Kong ===
Post holders included:

- Captain Richard L. Garnons-Williams: October 1975 – March 1978
- Captain Robert W. Moland: March 1978 – June 1980
- Captain Andrew A. Waugh: June 1980 – June 1982
- Captain Frederick A. Collins: June 1982 – March 1985
- Captain Christopher W. Gotto: March 1985 – July 1987
- Captain Peter Dalrymple-Smith: July 1987 – January 1990
- Captain Michael C. Gordon Lennox: January 1990 – 1992
- Captain Thomas L.M. Sunter: 1992–1994
- Captain Peter J. Melson: 1994–1995
- Captain Andrew K. Steele: 1995–1996

== Squadrons in Hong Kong ==
The following is a list of naval squadrons and fleets that called Tamar home:

- China Squadron 1844–1941, 1945–1992
- Far East Fleet/HK Sqdn 1969–1971
- Dragon Squadron 1971–1992
- 3 Raiding Royal Marines
- Hong Kong Royal Naval Volunteer Reserves 1967–1996; merged with Royal Naval Reserve (RNR) 1971
- LEP 1905–1996
- Dragon Squadron
- 120th Minesweeping Squadron 1958–1966; transferred to Singapore
- 6th Mine Countermeasure Squadron 1969–1997
- 6th Patrol Craft Squadron 1970–1997
- Operations and Training Base 1934–1997
- 3 Commando Brigade Royal Marines
- 47 Royal Marines
- British Pacific Fleet 1840s–1948; to Singapore as Far East Station
- HK Flotilla 1840s–1941, 1948–1992
- China Station – 4th Submarine Flotilla, Yangtse Flotilla, West River Flotilla, 8th Destroyer Flotilla
- 5th Cruiser Squadron
- 1st Escort Flotilla
- 4th Frigate Flotilla ?–1952
- Frigate Squadron 1952–1976
- Light Cruiser Squadron
- 415 Maritime Troop
- Naval Party 1009 (Hovercraft Unit)

== Naval facilities ==
A list of facilities used or built by the Royal Navy in Hong Kong:

- Prince of Wales Building 1978–1997; now Central Barracks of the PLA
- Lamont and Hope Drydocks
- Aberdeen Docks – destroyed
- Dry Dock 1902–1959
- Taikoo Dockyard – Hong Kong United Dockyards
- Royal Navy Dockyards 1902–1959
- Sai Wan Barracks 1844–1846
- Wellington Barracks 1946–1978, as HMS Tamar (demolished)
- North Barracks 1850s–1856, 1887–1959; from the Army and to HK Government 1959
- Victoria Barracks
- Redoubt and Lei Yue Mun Fortifications 1885–1887
- Lei Yue Mun Fort 1887–1987
- Reverse, Central, West and Pass Batteries 1880s
- Brennan Torpedo station 1890 – Lei Yue Mun
- Royal Naval Hospital, Wan Chai; now Ruttonjee Sanatorium
- Seaman's Hospital 1843–1873; replaced by Royal Naval Hospital
- RMS Queen Mary 1945–1946, as a hospital
- War Memorial Hospital (Matilda) 1946–1959
- British Military Hospital 1959–1995
- Island Group Practice 1995–1997, replaced British Military Hospital
- HMS Charlotte and HMS Victor Emmanuel – Receiving Ships
- Tidal Basin 1902–1959
- Boat Basin 1902–1959
- HM Victualling Yards 1859–1946

A list of facilities used or built by the Royal Navy in Hong Kong:

- Guard Room
- Chichester Block
- Aberdeen Docks
- Royal Naval Hospital, Wan Chai; now Ruttonjee Sanatorium
- Seaman's Hospital 1843–1873
- HMS Tamar – Receiving ship 1897–1941
- HMS Minden 1841–mid-1840s – hospital ship
- HMS Alligator 1840s–1865 – hospital ship
- HMS Melville 1860s–1873 – hospital ship (East Indies Sqdn)

== Ships ==
- Duty Boats – including Victoria
- RN Ferry (T-boats such as:Ah Moy) Numbers as T1. T2 etc. To ferry service personnels across Victoria Harbour, with Three stops, HMS Tamar (Admirialty), Stoncutter Island (British Military Base), Kowloon Public Pier.

== See also ==
- British Forces Overseas Hong Kong
- HMNB Singapore
- People's Liberation Army Hong Kong Garrison
- Ngong Shuen Chau Naval Base
- RM Tamar
