= Cedric Holland =

English vice-admiral (1889–1950)

Vice-Admiral Cedric Holland CB
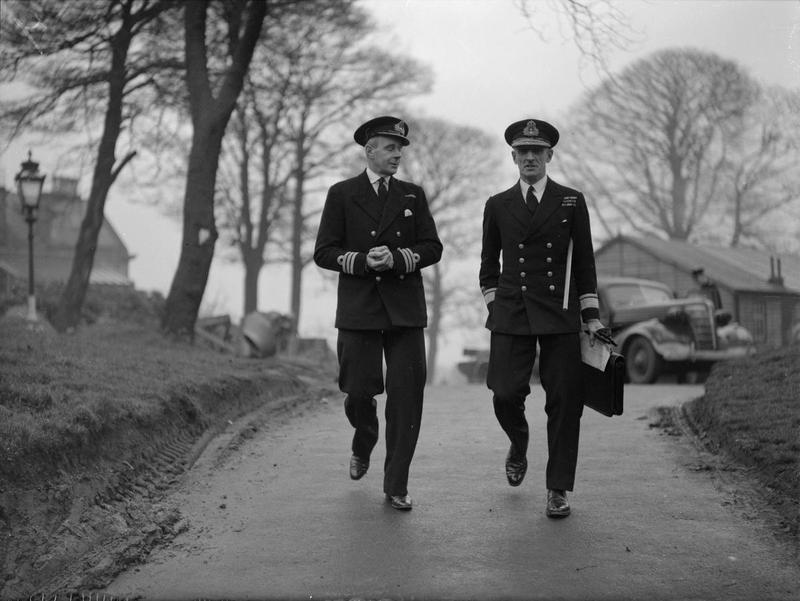
- Holland with Commander D. Joel in 1943
- Born: 13 October 1889; Alverstoke, Gosport, Hampshire
- Died: 11 May 1950 (aged 60)
- Relatives: Swinton Colthurst Holland (father)
- Military career
- Allegiance: United Kingdom
- Branch: Royal Navy
- Service years: 1905–1946
- Rank: Vice-Admiral
- Nickname: Hookey
- Commands: HMS Ark Royal; HMS Kempenfelt; HMS Kent
- Conflicts: First World War; Second World War; Operation Alphabet; Attack on Mers-el-Kébir; Operation Tiderace
- Awards: Companion of the Order of the Bath; Mentioned in Despatches (2); Knight of the Order of the Crown of Italy; Commander of the Legion of Merit (United States)

Vice-Admiral Cedric Swinton Holland, CB (13 October 1889 – 11 May 1950) was a senior officer of the Royal Navy who saw service during the First and Second World Wars.

Holland was born the son of an admiral, and he followed his father into the navy, rising through the ranks and serving on a number of ships. He was serving at the rank of lieutenant on a cruiser at the start of the First World War. He saw out the war aboard battleships in home water and the Mediterranean, punctuated with time ashore, and with a special interest in signalling and naval communications. He was promoted to lieutenant-commander after the war, and was in the Mediterranean during the Turkish War of Independence. He graduated to his own commands shortly after, commanding a cruiser on the China Station, then a destroyer in the Mediterranean. He became a naval attaché in Paris shortly before the outbreak of the Second World War, and remained in the position until April 1940.

Recalled to Britain at the fall of France, Holland assumed command of the aircraft carrier HMS Ark Royal, which he commanded during several actions and operations. He was prominent in the negotiations in the run up to the Attack on Mers-el-Kébir in July 1940, when the French fleet refused to agree to terms to either surrender or disarm to keep their fleet out of German hands. Holland left Ark Royal in 1941 to become chief of staff to Lord Gort, and later director of naval communications at the Admiralty. He spent the last years of the war as principal administrative officer with the Eastern Fleet, having been promoted to rear-admiral and then vice-admiral. His distinguished service brought him a number of accolades; he was twice Mentioned in Despatches, was appointed a Companion of the Order of the Bath, a Commander of the Legion of Merit by the United States, and a Knight of the Order of the Crown of Italy. Holland retired from naval service in 1946, and died in 1950.

== Family and early life ==
Cedric Holland was born in Alverstoke on 13 October 1889 to Eva Williams and her husband Swinton Colthurst Holland, who would rise to be an admiral. Cedric followed his father into the navy, joining HMS Britannia as a cadet on 15 January 1905, graduating as a midshipman on 15 May 1906 and going to serve aboard the armoured cruiser HMS Suffolk in the Mediterranean. He transferred to the battleship HMS Irresistible, also in the Mediterranean, on 3 September 1907, and then to HMS Bulwark in Home waters on 18 February 1908, where he remained until 14 September 1909.

Holland served for a period as acting sub-lieutenant, then was appointed sub-lieutenant on 30 September 1909. He was promoted to lieutenant on 31 August 1911. He served at this rank aboard the armoured cruiser HMS Shannon, part of the Grand Fleet, based at Scapa Flow. He was aboard Shannon at the outbreak of the First World War in August 1914, and remained there until November 1914.

Holland served as flag lieutenant to Rear-Admiral Mark Kerr aboard HMS Queen between June 1916 and May 1917, during her time in the Mediterranean as flagship of the British Squadron in the Adriatic. He served aboard HMS Queen Elizabeth for Signalling and Wireless Telegraphy duties with the Grand Fleet, from May 1917 until April 1919.

== Inter-war ==
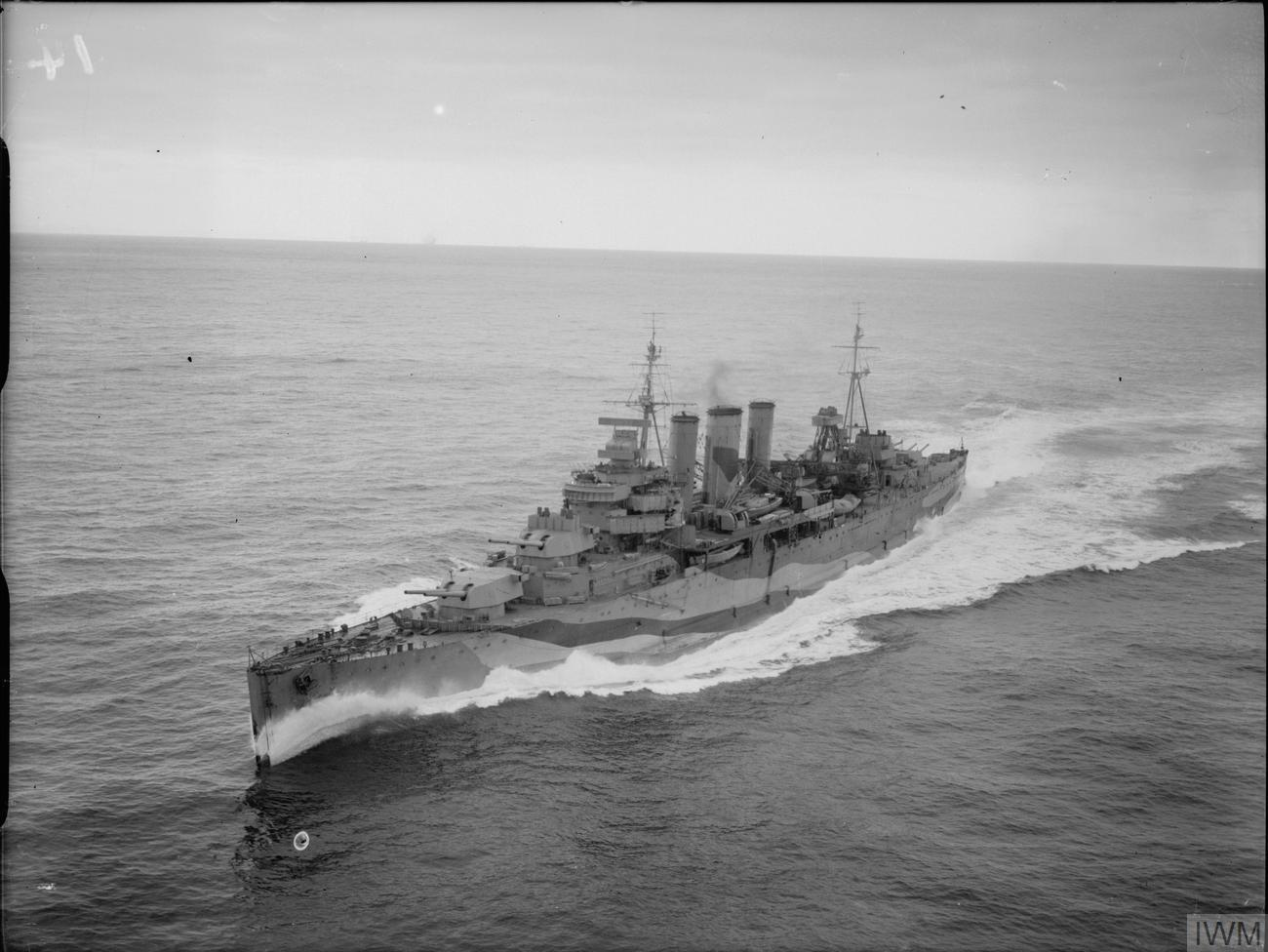
HMS Kent, which Holland commanded on the China Station between 1928 and 1929

Holland was gazetted on 4 April 1919 "for valuable services rendered in connection with the War". For his services during the war he was made a Knight of the Order of the Crown of Italy. He continued an active career at sea, being promoted to lieutenant-commander on 31 August 1919 and serving as Squadron Wireless Officer aboard HMS Revenge, based in the Mediterranean in 1920 during the Turkish War of Independence.

Holland was advanced to commander on 31 December 1924, and between July 1928 and August 1929 he commanded HMS Kent on the China Station, during which time he visited ports in China, South-East Asia and Japan. His service in this region allowed him to attend the funeral of Dr Sun Yat-sen on 31 May 1929, and the annual Naval Regatta at Wei-Hai-Wei. He was promoted to captain on 30 June 1932, and in 1934 he took command of the destroyer HMS Kempenfelt, serving in the Mediterranean until 1936.

Holland was a skilled French speaker and was posted as Naval Attaché for France, Holland, Belgium, Spain and Portugal from January 1938 to April 1940, and was the Head of the Naval Mission to the French Admiralty from the outbreak of war in September 1939 until April 1940.

== Second World War ==
Holland returned from his services with the French and in May 1940 took command of the aircraft carrier HMS Ark Royal, which he commanded until May 1941. Ark Royal participated in a number of key theatres of the war, and Holland commanded it during Operation Alphabet, the transport of troops from Narvik to Britain, numerous convoy escort missions through the Mediterranean, bombing raids on the Italian mainland, and the search for the German raiders Scharnhorst and Gneisenau.

=== Mers-el-Kébir ===
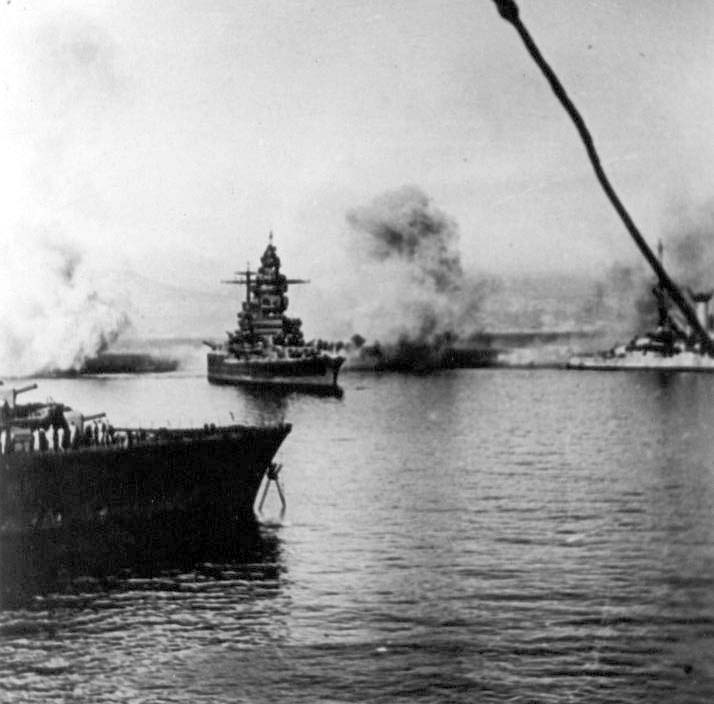
The French battleship Strasbourg under fire during the Attack on Mers-el-Kébir. Holland was the British representative at the talks, but could not stop the breakdown of negotiations.

Holland was particularly involved in the attack on the French fleet at Mers-el-Kébir in July 1940. A British fleet, Force H, was despatched under Admiral Sir James Somerville to insist the French either demilitarize their ships or hand them over to the British, to prevent their capture by the Germans. Holland, as a French speaker with experience from his time as naval attaché in Paris, was sent to deliver the terms and enter negotiations with the French naval officers. He was taken into Mers-el-Kébir with the ultimatum aboard HMS Foxhound early on 2 July. Holland and Somerville were strongly opposed to the use of force, hoping that a show of strength would be enough to convince the French to avoid fighting.

Apparently offended by Somerville's sending a junior officer to deal with him, the French commander, Admiral Marcel-Bruno Gensoul at first refused to meet Holland, and delegated his flag lieutenant, Bernard Dufay, to meet him instead. The negotiations dragged on for several hours, with the French unwilling to agree to terms. With French reinforcements reportedly en route, Holland tried to convince Somerville that the French crews were being reduced, and would sail to Martinique. But it was too little and came too late: the Admiralty pressed for a resolution and Holland was ordered to break off negotiations, and was taken back to his ship by HMS Forester. Twenty minutes after his arrival the British attacked, sinking several ships, badly damaging others and causing the death of 1300 French seamen.

=== Staff posts and flag rank ===
Holland left Ark Royal in May 1941 due to health problems, and was replaced by Captain Loben Maund. He became Chief of Staff to Lord Gort at Gibraltar, having been appointed a Naval Aide-de-camp on 17 July 1941. He was twice mentioned in despatches for his services commanding Ark Royal, gazetted on 27 June 1941, and again on 2 January 1942. He was with Gort until January 1942, when he became Director of Naval Communications at the Admiralty, holding the post until November 1943. He was promoted to rear-admiral on 6 February 1942, early in this posting, and on stepping down as director, became principal administrative officer for the navy in South-East Asia. His appointment marked the first of its kind, and he held it until September 1945, having been promoted to vice-admiral on 1 June 1945. During his time in the Far East he was involved in planning and carrying out Operation Tiderace, the re-occupation of Singapore, flying his flag aboard HMS Sussex.

== Post-war ==
Vice-Admiral Holland retired from active service in 1946. The United States government appointed him a Commander of the Legion of Merit for "distinguished services to the Allied Cause", and he was invested as a Companion of the Order of the Bath in 1945. Vice-Admiral Cedric Holland died on 11 May 1950 at the age of 60. Collections of his papers are held at the National Maritime Museum.

== Personal life ==
Holland married Agnes Barbara Dillwyn-Venables-Llewelyn, the daughter of Sir Charles Dillwyn-Venables-Llewelyn, 2nd Baronet, on 15 June 1925. The couple had two children, Katherine J. Holland, born in 1927, and John Swinton Holland, born in 1928.
