= HMS Australia =

Cruiser of the Royal Navy

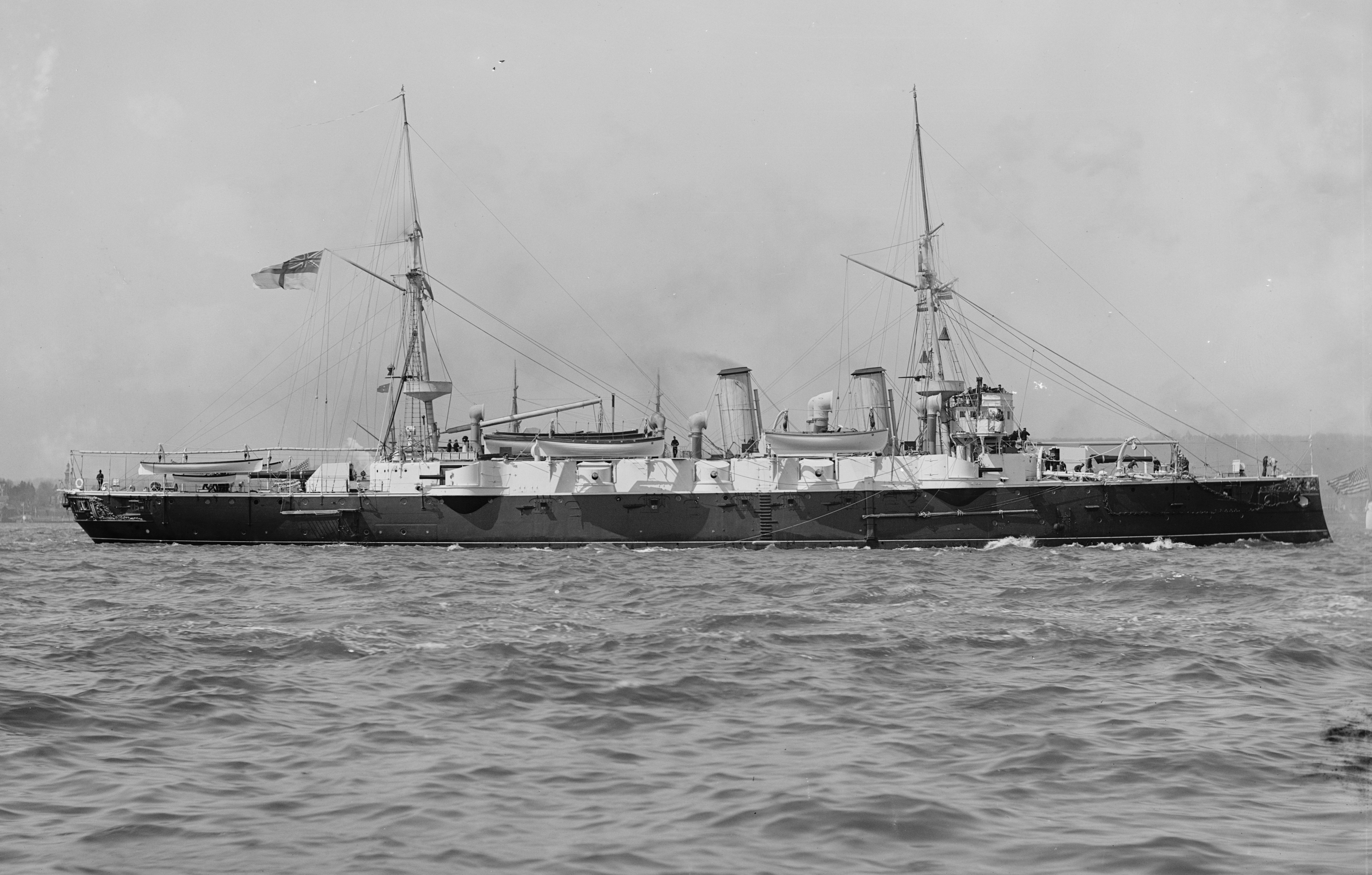
- Australia at anchor

History

United Kingdom
- Name: HMS Australia
- Namesake: Australia
- Builder: Robert Napier and Sons, Govan, Glasgow
- Laid down: 21 April 1885
- Launched: 25 November 1886
- Completed: 11 December 1888
- Fate: Sold for scrap, 4 April 1905

General characteristics
- Class & type: Orlando-class armoured cruiser
- Displacement: 5,535 long tons (5,624 t)
- Length: 300 ft (91.4 m) (p/p)
- Beam: 56 ft (17.1 m)
- Draught: 24 ft (7.3 m)
- Installed power: 8,500 ihp (6,300 kW); 4 × boilers
- Propulsion: 2 shafts; 2 × Triple-expansion steam engines
- Speed: 18 kn (33 km/h; 21 mph)
- Range: 8,000 nmi (15,000 km; 9,200 mi) at 10 knots (19 km/h; 12 mph)
- Complement: 484
- Armament: 2 × single BL 9.2-inch (234 mm) Mk V guns; 10 × single BL 6-inch (152 mm) guns; 6 × single QF 6-pounder (57 mm) Hotchkiss guns; 10 × single QF 3 pounder (47 mm) Hotchkiss guns; 6 × 18-inch (450 mm) torpedo tubes
- Armour: Waterline belt: 10 in (254 mm); Deck: 2–3 in (51–76 mm); Conning tower: 12 in (305 mm); Bulkheads: 16 in (406 mm)

HMS Australia was one of seven Orlando-class armoured cruisers built for the Royal Navy in the mid-1880s. She was assigned to the Mediterranean Fleet in 1889 and remained there until 1893 when she returned home. The ship was assigned to the Coast Guard Squadron for the next decade before she was placed in reserve in 1903. Australia was sold for scrap in 1905.

== Design and description ==
Australia had a length between perpendiculars of 300 feet (91.4 m), a beam of 56 feet (17.1 m) and a draught of 24 feet (7.3 m). Designed to displace 5,040 long tons (5,120 t), all of the Orlando-class ships proved to be overweight and displaced approximately 5,535 long tons (5,624 t).

The ship was powered by a pair of three-cylinder triple-expansion steam engines, each driving one shaft, which were designed to produce a total of 8,500 indicated horsepower (6,300 kW) and a maximum speed of 18 knots (33 km/h; 21 mph) using steam provided by four boilers with forced draught. During her sea trials, Australia reached 18.8 knots (34.8 km/h; 21.6 mph). The ship carried a maximum of 900 long tons (910 t) of coal which was designed to give her a range of 8,000 nautical miles (15,000 km; 9,200 mi) at a speed of 10 knots (19 km/h; 12 mph). The ship's complement was 484 officers and ratings.

Australia's main armament consisted of two breech-loading (BL) 9.2-inch (234 mm) Mk V guns, one gun fore and aft of the superstructure on pivot mounts. Her secondary armament was ten BL 6-inch (152 mm) guns, five on each broadside. Protection against torpedo boats was provided by six quick-firing (QF) 6-pounder Hotchkiss guns and ten QF 3-pounder Hotchkiss guns, most of which were mounted on the main deck in broadside positions. The ship was also armed with six 18-inch (457 mm) torpedo tubes: four on the broadside above water and one each in the bow and stern below water.

The ship was protected by a waterline compound armour belt 10 inches (254 mm) thick. It covered the middle 200 feet (61.0 m) of the ship and was 5 feet 6 inches (1.7 m) high. Because the ship was overweight, the top of the armour belt was 2 feet (0.61 m) below the waterline when she was fully loaded. The ends of the armour belt were closed off by transverse bulkheads 16 inches (406 mm). The lower deck was 2–3 inches (51–76 mm) thick over the full length of the hull. The conning tower was protected by 12 inches (305 mm) of armour.

== Construction and service ==
Australia, named for the Australian continent, was laid down on 21 April 1885 by Robert Napier and Sons at their shipyard in Govan, Glasgow.

The ship was launched on 25 November 1886, and completed on 11 December 1888. Shortly after commissioning, she was assigned to the Mediterranean Fleet and remained there until 1893 when she participated in the Columbian Review held in New York City that year to commemorate the 400th anniversary of Columbus' discovery of the New World.

Upon her return home, Australia became the coast guard ship for Southampton Water for the next decade. Captain Charles Henry Adair was briefly in command from November 1899 to January 1900, when Captain George Neville was appointed in command on 20 January 1900. She escorted the royal yacht HMY Osborne when Queen Victoria visited Ireland in April 1900, and in September the following year she visited Germany and Denmark when she escorted the royal yacht carrying King Edward VII from Hamburg to Elsinore.

She took part in the fleet review held at Spithead on 16 August 1902 for the coronation of King Edward VII. Captain Charles Home Cochran was appointed in command on 24 November 1902, but the ship was placed in reserve at Chatham Dockyard in early 1903, before being sold for scrap on 4 April 1905.
