= Stonecutters Island =

Former island in Victoria Harbour, Hong Kong

Coordinates: 22°19′20″N 114°8′10″E

- Chinese: 昂船洲
Transcriptions
Standard Mandarin
- Hanyu Pinyin: Ángchuánzhōu
Hakka
- Romanization: Ngong^{2} Son^{2} Ziu^{1}
Yue: Cantonese
- Jyutping: ngong5 syun4 zau1

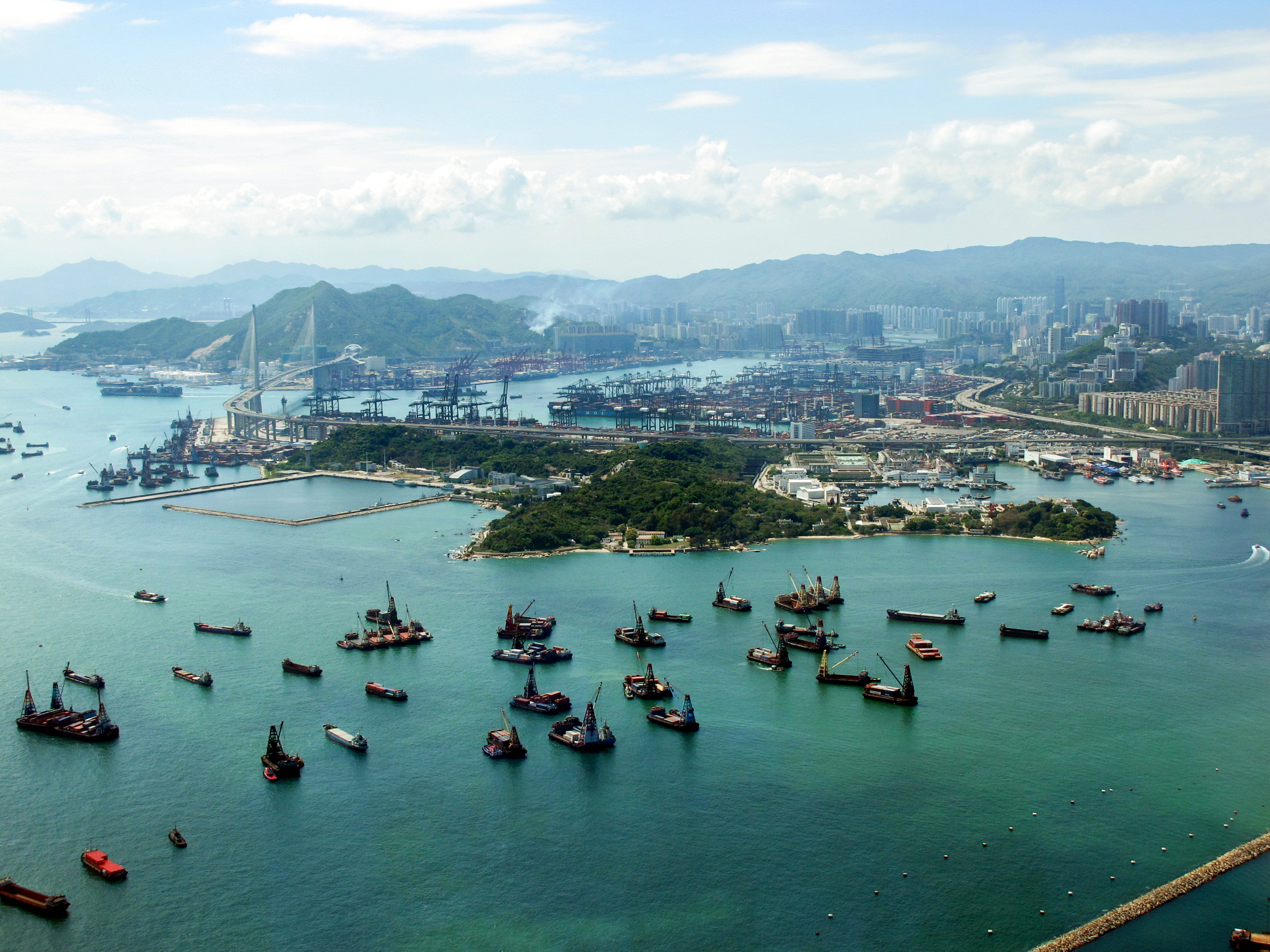
Stonecutters Island

Location of Stonecutters Island within Hong Kong

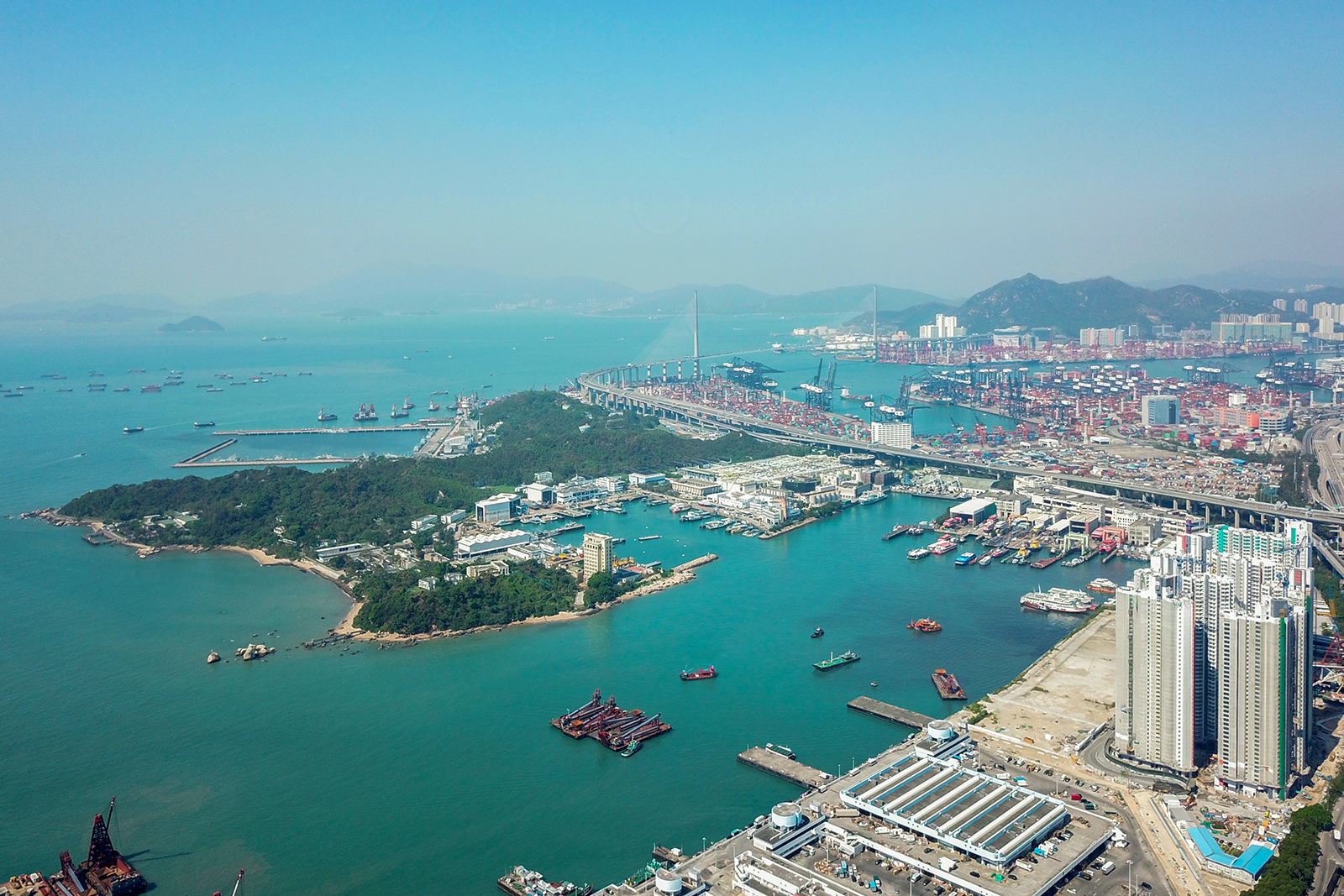
Stonecutters Island

Stonecutters Island or Ngong Shuen Chau is a former island in Victoria Harbour, Hong Kong. Following land reclamation, it is now attached to the Kowloon Peninsula.

== Fauna ==
The island once boasted at least three mating pairs of sulphur-crested cockatoos as well as many snakes; banded kraits, brown cobras and bamboo snakes were all common denizens as late as the 1980s. Black kites often hovered overhead, looking for prey and carrion amongst the many tamarind, ficus benjamina and banyan trees.

== History ==
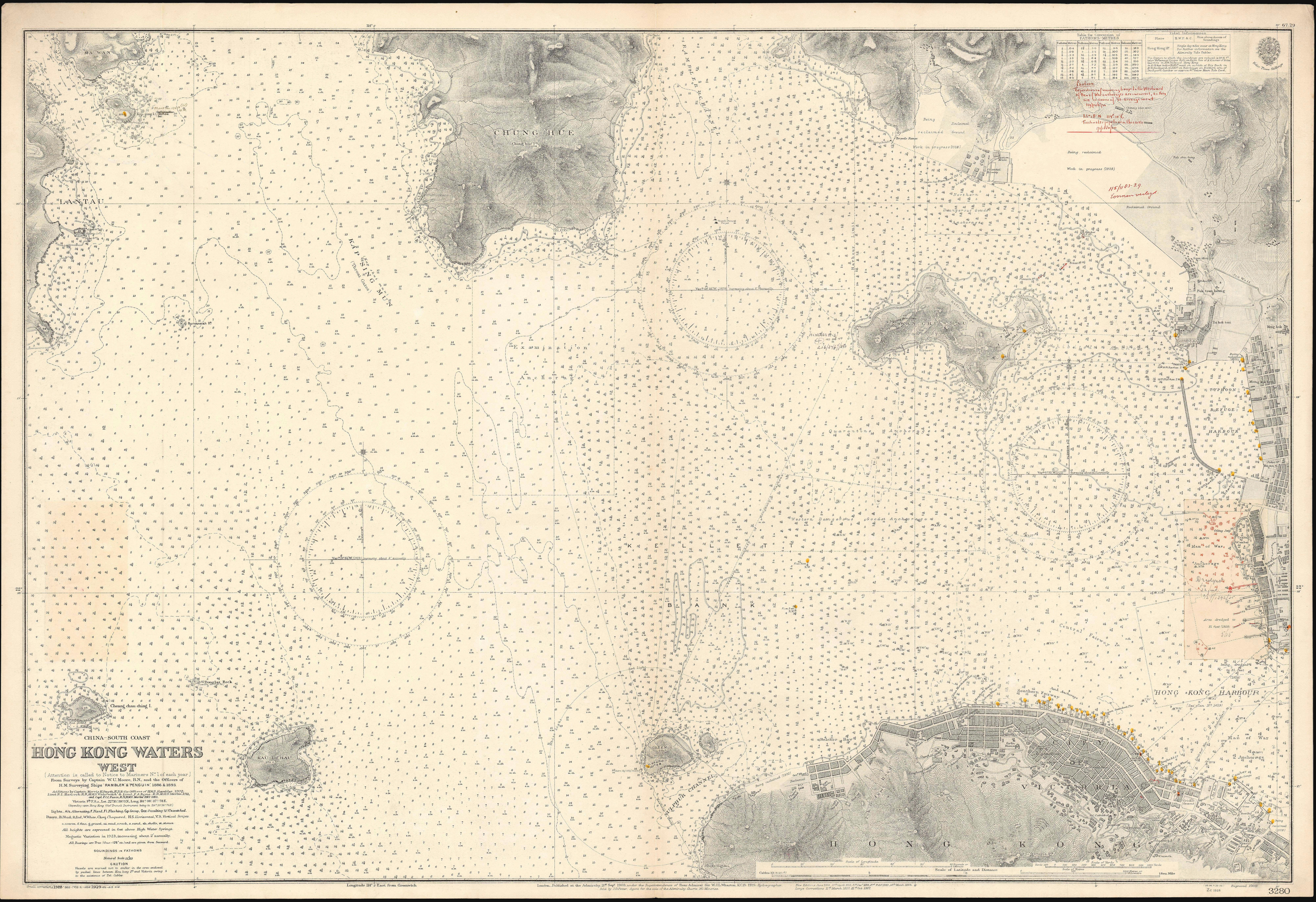
1903 map showing Stonecutters Island as an island.

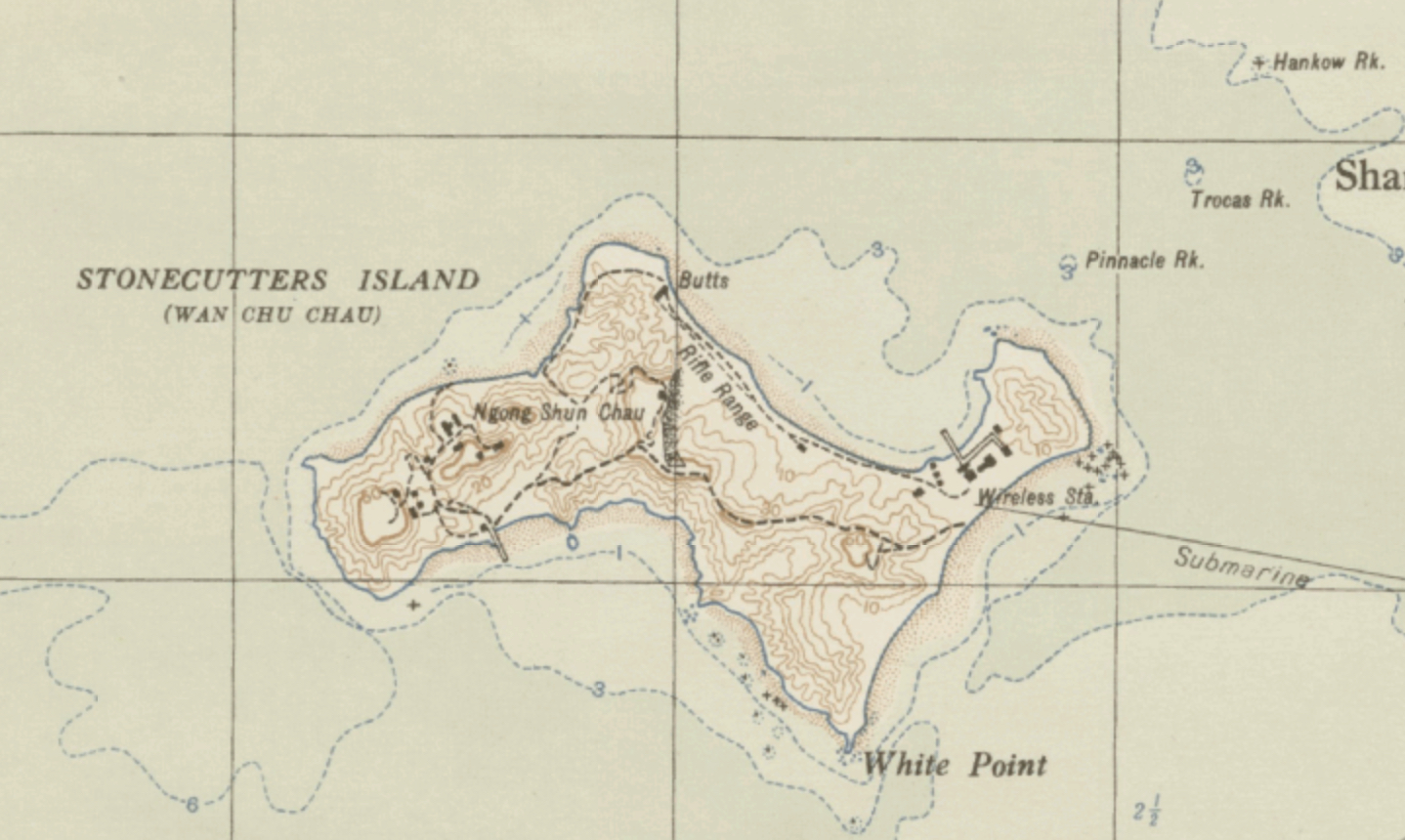
Stonecutters Island as on a 1928 map.

=== Under British rule ===
The island was ceded by the Qing dynasty to the United Kingdom of Great Britain and Ireland along with Kowloon in 1860 through the Convention of Peking. It was initially used for quarrying by the British, hence the English name for the island. In the 1850s it was the site of a prison.

A Royal Navy Radio Interception and Direction-finding Station was established on the island in 1935. From 1935 to 1939, the base was the main radio interception unit for the Far East Combined Bureau, which was four miles (6.4 kilometres) away across the harbour in the naval dockyard.

After World War II the island became host to British Army units including 415 Maritime Unit RCT and the Ammunition Sub-Depot RAOC. Explosive storage became more important following the 1967 riots and the Mines Division elected to have all commercial explosives stored on Stonecutters prior to being issued to the various blasting sites around the colony. British Royal Army Ordnance Corps soldiers oversaw all commercial explosive issues post-1968 until 1994, at which time the Royal Navy took over care and custody of the military explosives at the site. Civilian explosive storage and issues was controlled by civilian contractors. The Royal Navy retained care and custody until the colony was transferred to China in 1997. Before then, it was the training and HQ depot of the Hong Kong Military Service Corps.

The island was policed by Indian Sikhs, because traditionally they neither smoke nor drink alcohol. The Army Department Police (ADP), as they were known, saw continuous service on the island during the British era. They enjoyed field hockey, and were often seen playing barefoot on the field. During the early 1980s, the ADP boasted two Indian national hockey players. It was common to see their blue pagris (turbans) drying in the sun outside their barracks.

The Royal Navy continued to provide a ferry service (known as T-Boats) connecting the islanders with HMS Tamar on Hong Kong and the Star Ferry terminal in Kowloon. Additional boats were provided by 415 Maritime Unit RCT and crewed by Local Employed Personnel (LEPs).

During the 1960s, 70s and 80s, the island was used as a 'Rest and Recuperation' resort, having several chalet style bungalows built around the Navy, Army and Air Force Institutes shop, restaurant and swimming pool complex on the South Shore. There was also a commercial interest on the island; Jardine Matheson along with DuPont erected an explosives factory to cater to the ever-growing need for commercial blasting explosives. The factory manufactured several tonnes of water gel and other commercial explosives per week. Limited stocks of Chinese, British and other commercial explosives were stored in the island's Victorian explosive storage tunnels.

During the 1970s and 80s, the island was also the forward operating base (FOB) of a Royal Navy Hovercraft unit deployed to assist the Hong Kong government with anti-illegal immigration operations. The Royal Navy unit (Naval Party 1009) was under the control of Cmdr Chris Stafford and two SRN6 Mk6 Hovercraft were continually operated until 1985 when the unit was finally disbanded.

Some buildings or military facilities within the Ngong Shuen Chau Barracks are now graded historic buildings.

=== During World War II ===
Stonecutters Island was captured by the Japanese Imperial Army on 11 December 1941, following heavy shelling. Merchant ships in the island's docks were scuttled, and demolitions were carried out at Kowloon Naval Yard and on the island. During World War II, radio installations on the island were used by the Japanese for military purposes and for extending the range of transmission of the NHK Overseas Broadcasting Bureau.

The Japanese (during the WW2 occupation) used the unique isolation of the island to house a snake farm. The snakes were milked of their venom to provide antidotes for their soldiers bitten on active duty in the Pacific theatre.

=== After 1997 ===
Following the transfer of sovereignty over Hong Kong to the People's Republic of China on 1 July 1997, the naval base is now operated by the People's Liberation Army Navy.

== Infrastructure on the island ==
The island was connected to the Kowloon peninsula by the West Kowloon Reclamation in the 1990s to provide land for the construction of the road and railway network to the new Hong Kong International Airport at Chek Lap Kok, and for the Container Terminal 8 of Kwai Tsing Container Terminals.

Stonecutters Island is the site of a large sewage treatment facility known as Stonecutters Island Sewage Treatment Works. Since the facility was built in 2001, it has reduced the amount of E. coli in the nearby water by 99 per cent, while other pollutants have been reduced by 70-80 per cent, allowing coral to return to Victoria Harbour and make Hong Kong's beaches safe for swimming again.

Stonecutters Bridge, a cable-stayed bridge linking the Kowloon peninsula with Tsing Yi Island over Rambler Channel to form part of Route 8, opened on 20 December 2009.

== See also ==
- Hong Kong
- List of islands and peninsulas of Hong Kong
- List of places in Hong Kong
- Stonecutters Bridge
- Ngong Shuen Chau Naval Base
