= HMY Osborne (1870) =

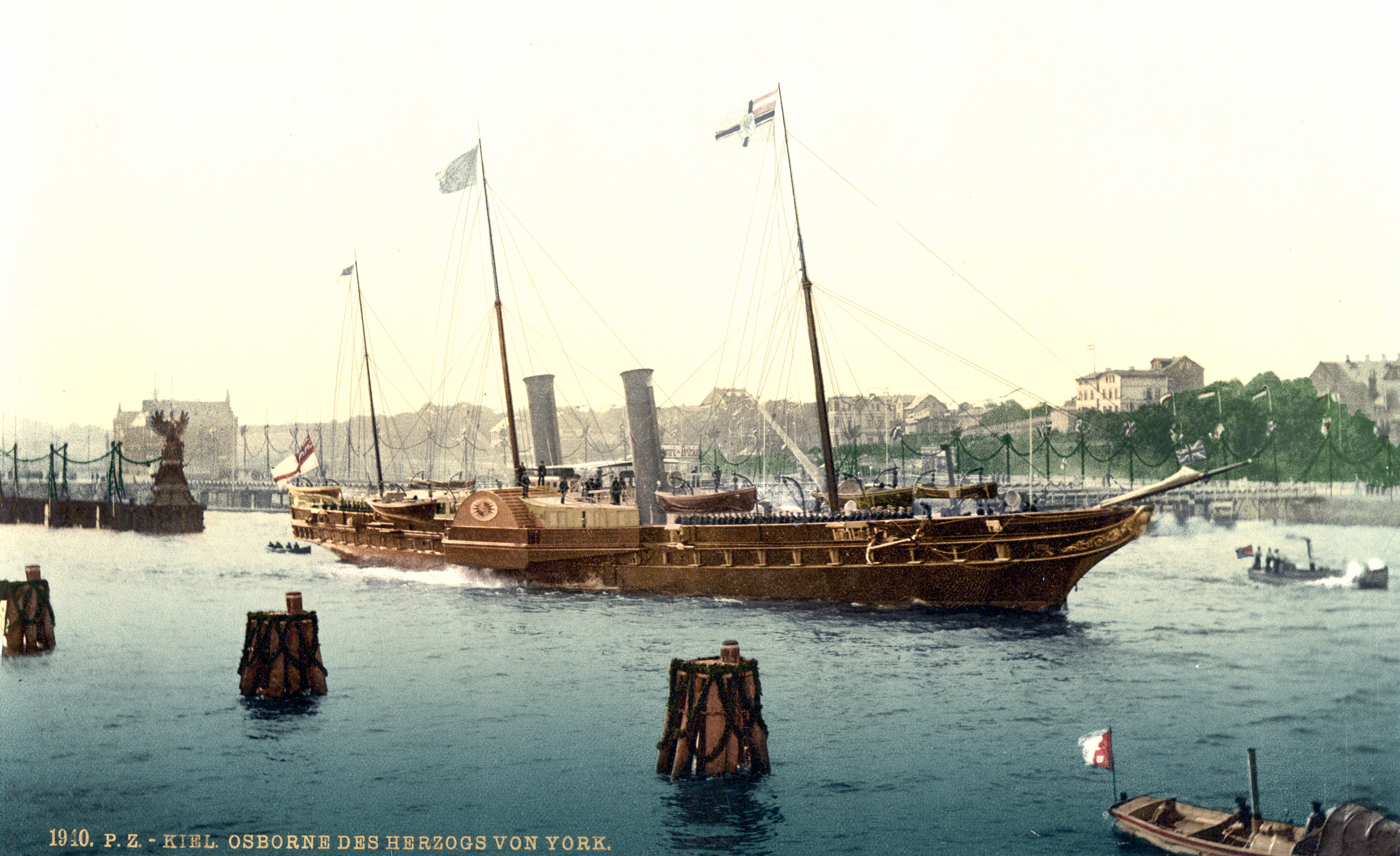
- HMY Osborne photochrome print, circa 1895

History

United Kingdom
- Name: HMY Osborne
- Owner: Her Majesty's Government
- Operator: Royal Navy
- Builder: Pembroke Dockyard
- Launched: 19 December 1870
- Decommissioned: 1908
- Fate: Scrapped

General characteristics
- Tonnage: 1856
- Length: 250 ft (76 m)
- Beam: 36 ft (11 m)

HMY Osborne was a paddle steamer Royal Yacht of the Royal Navy of the United Kingdom. Designed by Edward James Reed, she was launched on 19 December 1870 at Pembroke Royal Dockyard and replaced the yacht of the same name formerly known as HMY Victoria and Albert.

She measured 1,850 tons, and was used for cruises to foreign countries and later on the short run to Osborne House on the Isle of Wight. In 1898 wireless equipment was installed by Marconi. This allowed the Prince of Wales to keep in touch with his mother Queen Victoria, at Osborne House.

Commander Charles Eustace Anson was appointed in command on 28 December 1900, and was in command during the funeral arrangements for Queen Victoria the following month.

She was scrapped in 1908 having been superseded by HMY Alexandra.
